= Li Chiao =

Li Chiao may refer to:

- Li Jiao (Chinese: 李嶠), an official of the Chinese Tang dynasty and Wu Zetian's Zhou dynasty.
- Li Chiao (Chinese: 李喬; 1934–), a Taiwanese novelist and cultural critic.
