= Cheng Ch'ing-wen =

Taiwanese writer (1932–2017)

- 鄭清文
- Born: 16 September 1932; Taoyuan, Taiwan
- Died: 4 November 2017 (aged 85); Taipei, Taiwan
- Education: National Taiwan University
- Occupation: Writer

Cheng Ch'ing-wen (Chinese: 鄭清文; Pe̍h-ōe-jī: Tēⁿ Chheng-bûn; 16 September 1932 – 4 November 2017) was a Taiwanese writer and a graduate of National Taiwan University. Cheng Ch'ing-wen was born in Taoyuan Street, Taoyuan City, during the Japanese rule of Taiwan. Originally surnamed Li, he was later adopted by his uncle and changed his surname to Cheng. While working at a bank, he continued to write.

He worked at the then government-run Hua Nan Bank for forty years. His works in English are generally under the transliteration "Cheng Ch'ing-Wen" and that is how he is described in many English-language publications published in Taiwan. The transliteration "Tzeng Ching-wen" is also used.

He was one of the leaders of the Taiwanese "nativist" movement. Cheng was fluent in Taiwanese Hokkien. He graduated from elementary school in Taiwan with six years of instruction in Japanese, and only thereafter began to learn Chinese.

A collection of twelve of his short stories, Three-Legged Horse, was made available in English in 1998, and won the 1999 Kiriyama Prize for fiction.

His works included short stories, essays, and fairy tales. His three collections of fairy tales (Swallow Heart Berries, Sky Lanterns/Mother, and Picking Peaches) are populated with birds, insects, and other animals that all have the ability to speak, in a manner common to fairy tales.

Cheng died at the age of 85, on November 4, 2017.

== Works ==
In 1958, Cheng Ching-Wen published his first work, "Lonely Heart", in the United Daily News supplement. Encouraged by the then-editor Lin Hai-yin, he continued to publish works and released short stories such as Dustpan Valley (簸箕谷) and Gorge Landscape (峽地). In his later years, he focused on writing Taiwanese fairy tales, emphasizing the cultivation of children's innovative imagination. His knowledge of Japanese allowed him to read Japanese translations of Western classics, influencing his deep connection with Western literature. His writing style was primarily influenced by Ernest Hemingway’s "iceberg theory", favoring simple structures and plain narrative language to conceal profound meanings within his works. Three-Legged Horse, a collection of his stories translated into English, has been published by Columbia University Press (2000).

Most of Cheng Ching-Wen's short stories depict the constraints and reactions of individuals in the face of societal and temporal changes, illuminated through the perspective of inner lives. He excelled at using a plain and unremarkable style to present the turbulent and deep psychological activities beneath the surface. Taiwanese writer Li Chiao (李喬) once remarked that Cheng was adept at describing the "process of tragedy". His works often feature the place name "Old Town", symbolizing his childhood residence in Hsinchuang.
