= Michael Kwan (disambiguation) =

Michael Kwan is a personal name. Notable people with the name include:

- Michael Kwan (born 1949), Hong Kong musician
- Michael David Kwan (1934–2001), Chinese writer
