= Enoch Powell =

British politician (1912–1998)

Brigadier The Right Honourable Enoch Powell MBE
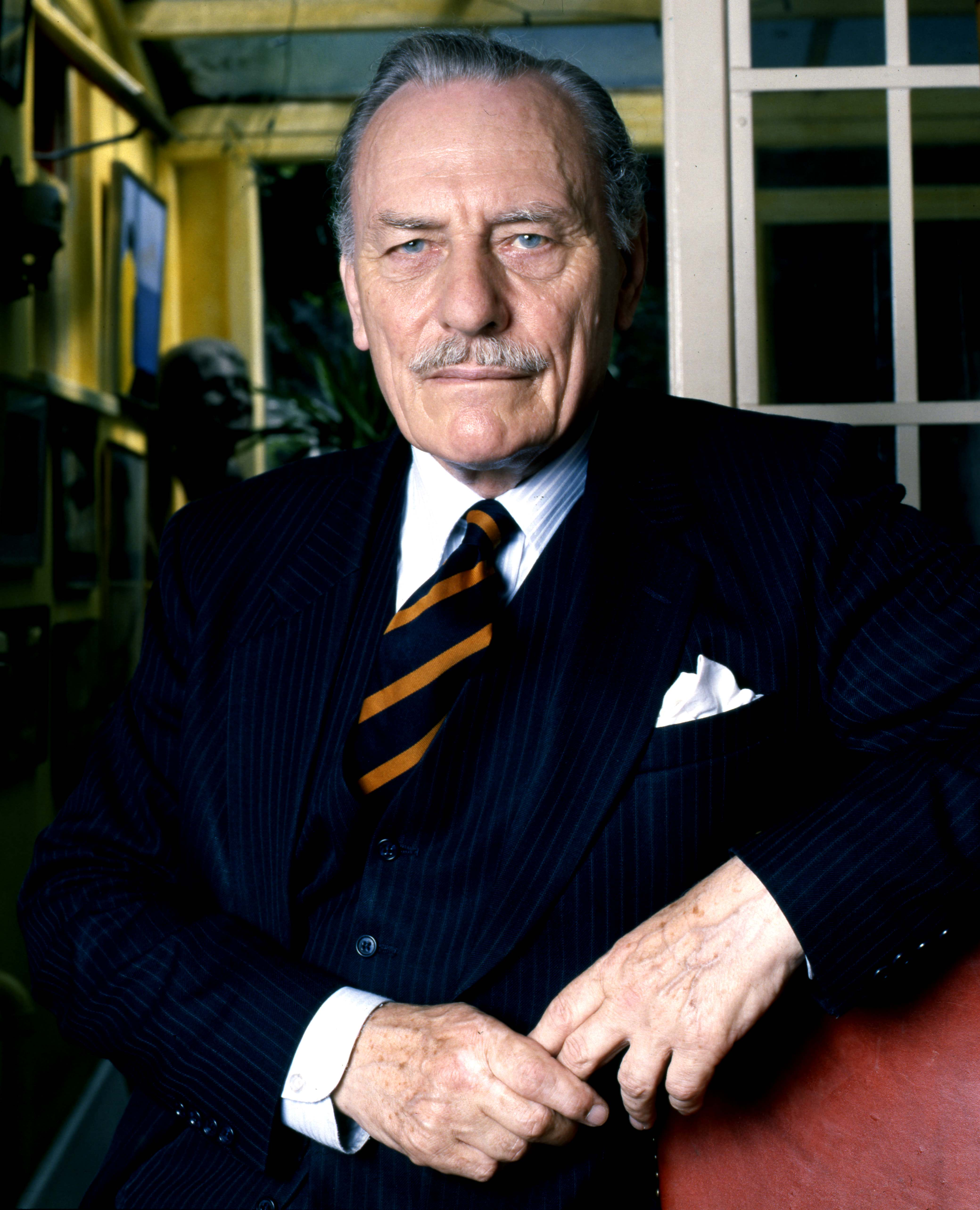
- Portrait by Allan Warren, 1987

Shadow Secretary of State for Defence
- In office 7 July 1965 – 21 April 1968
- Leader: Edward Heath
- Preceded by: Peter Thorneycroft
- Succeeded by: Reginald Maudling

Minister of Health
- In office 27 July 1960 – 18 October 1963
- Prime Minister: Harold Macmillan
- Preceded by: Derek Walker-Smith
- Succeeded by: Anthony Barber

Financial Secretary to the Treasury
- In office 14 January 1957 – 15 January 1958
- Prime Minister: Harold Macmillan
- Preceded by: Henry Brooke
- Succeeded by: Jack Simon

Member of Parliament
- In office 10 October 1974 – 18 May 1987
- Preceded by: Lawrence Orr
- Succeeded by: Eddie McGrady
- Constituency: South Down
- In office 23 February 1950 – 8 February 1974
- Preceded by: Constituency established
- Succeeded by: Nicholas Budgen
- Constituency: Wolverhampton South West

Personal details
- Born: John Enoch Powell; 16 June 1912 Stechford, Birmingham, England
- Died: 8 February 1998 (aged 85) London, England
- Resting place: Warwick Cemetery, Warwick, England
- Party: Conservative (1947–1974); Ulster Unionist (1974–1987)
- Spouse: Pamela Wilson (m. 1952)
- Children: 2
- Education: Trinity College, Cambridge; School of Oriental Studies
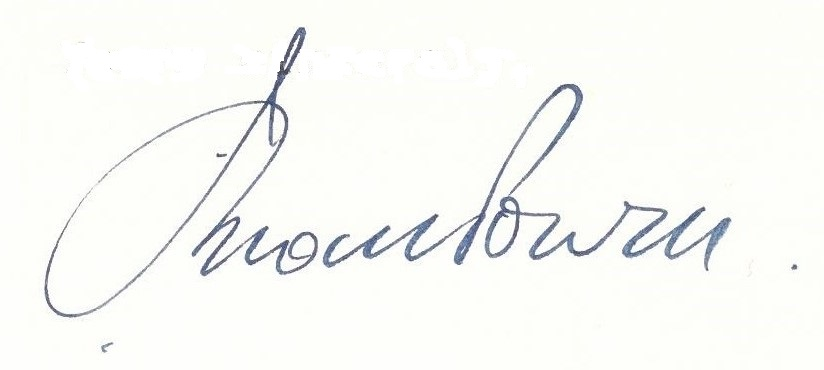
- Signature

Military service
- Branch: British Army
- Service years: 1939–1945
- Rank: Brigadier
- Unit: Royal Warwickshire Regiment; General Service Corps; Intelligence Corps
- Conflicts: Second World War; North African campaign; British India
- Awards: Member of the Order of the British Empire (1943)

John Enoch Powell (16 June 1912 – 8 February 1998) was a British politician, scholar, soldier and writer. He was the Member of Parliament (MP) for Wolverhampton South West for the Conservative Party from 1950 to February 1974 and the MP for South Down for the Ulster Unionist Party (UUP) from October 1974 to 1987. He was Minister of Health from 1960 to 1963 in the second Macmillan ministry and was Shadow Secretary of State for Defence from 1965 to 1968 in the Shadow Cabinet of Edward Heath.

Before entering politics, Powell was a classical scholar; in 1937 he was appointed Professor of Greek at the University of Sydney, aged 25. He served in the British Army during the Second World War, reaching the rank of brigadier. He wrote both poetry and books on classical and political subjects. He is remembered particularly for his views on immigration and demographic change. In 1968 Powell attracted attention nationwide for his "Rivers of Blood" speech, in which he criticised immigration to Britain, especially the rapid influx from the Commonwealth of Nations (former colonies of the British Empire) in the post-war era. He opposed the Race Relations Bill, a major anti-discrimination bill proposed by the Labour government of Harold Wilson, which ultimately became law. His speech was criticised by some of his own party members and The Times as racialist. Heath, who was then the leader of the Conservative Party and the leader of the Opposition, dismissed Powell from the Shadow Cabinet the day after the speech. In the aftermath several polls suggested that between 67 and 82 per cent of the British population agreed with Powell.

Shortly before the February 1974 general election, Powell turned his back on the Conservatives and endorsed a vote for the Labour Party, which returned as a minority government. Powell was returned to the House of Commons in October 1974 as the Ulster Unionist Party MP for the constituency of South Down in Northern Ireland. He represented it until he was defeated at the 1987 general election. Powell died in 1998, aged 85, and remains a divisive and controversial figure in Britain.

== Early years ==
John Enoch Powell was born on 16 June 1912 in Stechford, within the city of Birmingham, and was baptised at St Nicholas's Church in Newport, Shropshire, where his parents had married in 1909. He was the only child of Albert Enoch Powell, a primary school headmaster, and his wife Ellen Mary Powell (who was the daughter of Henry Breese, a Liverpool policeman, and his wife Eliza, who had been a teacher). His mother did not like his name and as a child he was known as "Jack". At the age of three, Powell was nicknamed "the Professor" because he used to stand on a chair and describe the stuffed birds that his grandfather had shot, which were displayed in his parents' home. In 1918 the family moved to Kings Norton, where Powell remained until he went up to the University of Cambridge in 1930.

The Powells were of Welsh descent and from Radnorshire (a Welsh border county), having moved to the developing Black Country during the early 19th century. Enoch's great-grandfather was a coal-miner and his grandfather had been in the iron trade.

Powell read avidly from a young age; as early as three, he could "read reasonably well". Though not wealthy, the Powells were financially comfortable and their home included a library. By the age of six, Powell loved to read. Every Sunday he would give lectures to his parents on the books that he had read and also conducted evensong and preached a sermon. Once he was old enough to go out on his own, Powell would walk around rural Worcestershire with the aid of Ordnance Survey maps, which instilled in him a love for landscape and cartography.

== Education ==
Powell attended a dame school until he was eleven. He was then a pupil for three years at King's Norton Grammar School for Boys before he won a scholarship to King Edward's School in Birmingham in 1925, aged 13. The legacy of the First World War loomed large for Powell; almost all his teachers had fought in the war. He formed the view that Britain and Germany would fight again.

Powell's mother began teaching him Greek in the two weeks of Christmas break in 1925. By the time he started the next term, he had attained a level in Greek that most pupils would reach after two years. Within two terms, Powell was top of the classics form. (Note: His classmate, Christopher Evans, recalled that Powell was "austere" and "really unlike any schoolboy one had known ... He was quite a phenomenon".) (Note: Another contemporary, Denis Hills, later said that Powell "carried an armful of books and kept to himself ... he was reputed to be cleverer than any of the masters".)

Precociously, Powell won all three of the school's classics prizes (Note: Thucydides, Herodotus and Divinity) and would win more later in his school career. In the fifth form he began to translate Herodotus's Histories. He entered the sixth form two years before his classmates and was remembered as a hard-working student. (Note: Powell's contemporary, Roy Lewis, recalled that "we thought that the masters were afraid of him".) Powell also won a medal in gymnastics and gained a proficiency in the clarinet. He contemplated studying at the Royal Academy of Music, but his parents persuaded him to try for a scholarship at Cambridge. (Note: Duggie Smith, Powell's form-master in the lower classical sixth and his principal classics master in the upper sixth, recalled in 1952: "Of all my pupils, he always insisted on the highest standards of accuracy and knowledge in those who taught him ... He was a pupil from whom I learnt more than most".)

It was during his time in the sixth form that Powell learned German. He was influenced by reading James George Frazer's The Golden Bough and Thomas Carlyle's Sartor Resartus, which led him towards the works of Johann Wolfgang von Goethe and Friedrich Nietzsche. (Note: In 1929, he was awarded the Higher School Certificate with a distinction in Latin, Greek and ancient history, and won the school's Lee Divinity Prize for an essay on the New Testament after having memorised St Paul's Epistle to the Galatians in Greek.) (Note: Powell also won the Badger Prize for English Literature twice and the Lightfoot Thucydides Prize.)

Aged 17, Powell sat the classics scholarship paper at Trinity College, Cambridge, and won the top award. (Note: Sir Ronald Melville, who sat the exams at the same time, recalled that "the exams mostly lasted three hours. Powell left the room halfway through each of them". Powell later told Melville that, in one-and-a-half hours on the Greek paper, he translated the text into Thucydides's style of Greek and then in the style of Herodotus.) (Note: For another paper, Powell also had to translate a passage from Bede, which he did into Platonic Greek. In the remaining time, Powell later remembered, "I tore it up and translated it again into Herodotean Greek – Ionic Greek – (which I had never written before) and then, still having time to spare, I proceeded to annotate it".) Powell studied at Trinity from 1930 to 1933. He became almost a recluse and devoted his time to studying. (Note: On days without lectures or supervisions, he would read from 5:30 am to 9:30 pm.) The British literary magazine Granta called him "The Hermit of Trinity". (Note: Powell later said "I thought the only thing to do was to work. I thought that was what I was going to Cambridge for, because I never knew of anything else".) At the age of 18 his first paper to a classical journal was published (in German) in the Philologische Wochenschrift, on a line of Herodotus. While studying at Cambridge, Powell became aware that there was another classicist who signed his name as "John U. Powell". Powell decided to use his middle name and began referring to himself as "Enoch Powell". Powell won the Craven scholarship at the beginning of his second term in 1931. It was at Cambridge that Powell fell under the influence of the poet A. E. Housman, then Professor of Latin at the university.

At Cambridge, Powell won a number of prizes, including the Percy Pemberton Prize, the Porson Prize, the Yeats Prize and the Lees Knowles, the Members' prize for Latin prose, the Browne Medal, the First Chancellor's Classical Medal and the Cromer Greek essay prize of the British Academy. (Note: having written on "Thucydides, his moral and historical principles and their influence in later antiquities") (Note: The Chancellor of Cambridge University, the Conservative Party leader Stanley Baldwin, told the Master of Trinity J. J. Thomson: "Powell reads as if he understands". He graduated with first class with distinction) (Note: Shortly before his finals in May 1933, Powell became ill with tonsillitis and then suffered pyelitis. His neighbour in Trinity Great Court, Frederick Simpson, arranged that the Tripos examination papers be sent to the nursing home where he was convalescing. Despite having a temperature of 104 degrees (40 °C) when he sat the last of the seven papers, Powell gained a first class with distinction.)

Powell took a course in Urdu at the School of Oriental Studies (now SOAS, University of London), because he felt that his long-cherished ambition of becoming Viceroy of India would be unattainable without knowledge of an Indian language. Later, during his political career, he would speak to his Indian-born constituents in Urdu. Powell went on to learn other languages, such as Welsh, modern Greek and Portuguese.

== Academic career ==
After graduating from Cambridge, Powell stayed on at Trinity College as a fellow, spending much of his time studying ancient manuscripts in Latin and producing academic works in Greek and Welsh. He won the Craven travelling scholarship, which he used to fund travels to Italy, where he researched Greek manuscripts. He also learned Italian. Powell was still convinced of the inevitability of war with Germany after Adolf Hitler came to power in Germany in 1933: he told his father in 1934, "I want to be in the army from the first day that Britain goes to war". He suffered a spiritual crisis when he heard of the Night of the Long Knives in July 1934, which shattered his vision of German culture. (Note: Powell recalled that he sat for hours in a state of shock: "So it had all been illusion, all fantasy, all a self-created myth ... The spiritual homeland had not been a spiritual homeland after all, since nothing can be a homeland, let alone a spiritual homeland, where there is no justice, where justice does not reign".)

Powell spent his time at Trinity teaching and supervising undergraduates and worked on a lexicon of Herodotus. Since 1932, Powell had been working on the Egyptian manuscripts of J. Rendel Harris and his translation from Greek into English was published in 1937.

Powell published the collection First Poems in 1937, which was influenced by Housman. (Note: The Times Literary Supplement noted they possessed to a degree "the tone and temper" of Housman's A Shropshire Lad. The Poet Laureate John Masefield told Powell he read them "with a great deal of admiration for their concision and point", while Hilaire Belloc said: "I have read them with the greatest pleasure and interest ... I shall always retain them".) His second volume of poems, Casting Off, and Other Poems, was printed in 1939. (Note: In its review, The Times Literary Supplement said Powell's "lyrical feeling, reflection, and an epigrammatic conciseness are pleasantly balanced, and he is particularly happy perhaps in saluting the blossoms of spring".) (Note: Maurice Cowling appraised Powell's poems as "restrained and pessimistic, and written out of a high sense of human destiny. It expressed the position of youth and had an eschatological overtone characteristic of Housman's repressed tombstone emotion. It registered the resigned, masculine gloom of the Trinity ethos into which he had been inducted".) A further collection of poems, Dancer's End and The Wedding Gift, were published in 1951. A full collection of poems was published in one volume in 1990. (Note: Powell said the first two volumes were "dominated by the War – the War foreseen, the War imminent, and the War actual", and the second group were a "response to a brief period...of intense emotional excitement".)

In 1937, he was appointed Professor of Greek at the University of Sydney, aged 25, (failing in his aim of beating Nietzsche's record of becoming a professor at 24). He was the youngest professor in the British Empire. He revised Henry Stuart Jones's edition of Thucydides's Historiae for the Oxford University Press in 1938. His most lasting contribution to classical scholarship was his Lexicon to Herodotus, published by Cambridge University Press the same year, which was well received by critics.

Soon after his arrival in Australia, he was appointed curator of the Nicholson Museum at the University of Sydney. He informed the vice-chancellor that war would soon begin in Europe and that when it did, he would be heading home to enlist in the army. In his inaugural lecture as professor of Greek in May 1938, he condemned Britain's policy of appeasement. (Note: After Neville Chamberlain's first visit to Adolf Hitler at Berchtesgaden, Powell wrote in a letter to his parents on 18 September 1938: "I do here, in the most solemn and bitter manner, curse the Prime Minister of England for having cumulated all his other betrayals of the national interest and honour, by his last terrible exhibition of dishonour, weakness and gullibility. The depths of infamy to which our accurst "love of peace" can lower us are unfathomable.) (Note: In another letter to his parents in June 1939, before the beginning of war, Powell wrote: "It is the English, not their Government; for if they were not blind cowards, they would lynch Chamberlain and Halifax and all the other smarmy traitors".) At the outbreak of war, Powell immediately returned to England.

== Military service ==
In October 1939, Powell enlisted as a private in the Royal Warwickshire Regiment. He had trouble enlisting, as during the "Phoney War" the War Office did not want men with no military training. Rather than waiting to be called up, he claimed to be Australian, as Australians (many of whom had travelled to Britain to join up) were allowed to enlist straight away. He was promoted from private to lance-corporal and completed officer training. He told colleagues that he expected to be at least a major-general by the end of the war.

On 18 May 1940, Powell was commissioned as a second lieutenant onto the General List. He was transferred to the Intelligence Corps and later promoted to captain, posted as GSO3 (Intelligence) to the 1st (later 9th) Armoured Division. During this time, he taught himself Russian; as insufficient Russian-speaking officers were available at the War Office, his knowledge of Russian and his textual analysis skills were used to translate a Russian parachute training manual; he was convinced that the Soviet Union must eventually enter the war on the Allied side.

In October 1941, Powell was posted to Cairo in the Kingdom of Egypt and then transferred back to the Royal Warwickshire Regiment. He was promoted to major in May 1942 and then to lieutenant colonel in August 1942. In that role he helped to plan the Second Battle of El Alamein, having previously helped to plan the attack on Erwin Rommel's supply lines. The following year, he was appointed a Member of the Order of the British Empire (MBE) for his military service. During his time in Algiers, Powell began to distrust the United States' position. Powell's suspicion of the anti-British Empire nature of the US federal government's foreign policy continued for the remainder of the war and into his subsequent post-war political career.

Following the Axis defeat at the Second Battle of El Alamein, Powell's attention increasingly moved to the Far East theatre, where the Allies were fighting the Imperial Japanese Army (IJA). He wished to be assigned to the Chindits units operating in Burma. He secured a posting to the British Indian Army in Delhi as a lieutenant-colonel in military intelligence in August 1943. Powell was appointed Secretary to the Joint Intelligence Committee for India and Lord Mountbatten's Southeast Asia Command, involved in planning an amphibious offensive against Akyab.

Powell had continued to learn Urdu. He had an ambition of eventually becoming Viceroy of India, and when Mountbatten transferred his staff to Kandy, Ceylon, Powell chose to remain in Delhi. He was promoted to full colonel at the end of March 1944, as assistant director of military intelligence in India, giving intelligence support to the Burma campaign of Field Marshal William Slim. Powell ended the war as a brigadier, for a while, the youngest in the British Army. He told a colleague that he expected to be head of all military intelligence in "the next war". Powell never experienced combat and felt guilty for having survived, writing that soldiers who did so carried "a sort of shame with them to the grave".

== Entry into politics ==
Powell voted for the Labour Party in their 1945 landslide victory because he wanted to punish the Conservative Party for the Munich Agreement. After the war he joined the Conservatives and worked for the Conservative Research Department (CRD) under Rab Butler, where his colleagues included Iain Macleod and Reginald Maudling.

Powell's ambition to be Viceroy of India crumbled in February 1947 when the prime minister, Clement Attlee, stated that Indian independence was imminent. Powell was so shocked by the change of policy that he spent the whole night walking the streets of London. He came to terms with it by becoming fiercely anti-imperialist, believing that once India had gone, the whole empire should follow it. This logical absolutism explained his later indifference to the Suez Crisis, his contempt for the Commonwealth and his urging that Britain should end any remaining pretence that it was a world power.

After unsuccessfully contesting the Labour Party's safe seat of Normanton at a by-election in 1947 (when the Labour majority was 62 per cent), he was elected the Conservative MP for Wolverhampton South West at the 1950 general election.

=== First years as a backbencher ===
On 16 March 1950, Powell made his maiden speech in the House of Commons. For the rest of his life he regarded this speech as the finest he ever delivered (rather than the much more well-known 1968 anti-immigration speech). On 3 March 1953 he spoke against the Royal Titles Bill in the Commons. (Note: Powell said he found three major changes to the style of the United Kingdom, "all of which seem to me to be evil". The first one was "that in this title, for the first time, will be recognised a principle hitherto never admitted in this country, namely, the divisibility of the crown." Powell said that the unity of the realm had evolved over centuries and included the British Empire: "It was a unit because it had one Sovereign. There was one Sovereign: one realm." He feared that by "recognising the division of the realm into separate realms, are we not opening the way for that other remaining unity — the last unity of all—that of the person, to go the way of the rest?") (Note: The second change he objected to was "the suppression of the word 'British', both from before the words 'Realms and Territories' where it is replaced by the words 'her other' and from before the word 'Commonwealth', which, in the Statute of Westminster, is described as the 'British Commonwealth of Nations, "say that he is Monarch of a certain territory and his other realms and territories is as good as to say that he is king of his kingdom. We have perpetrated a solecism in the title we are proposing to attach to our Sovereign and we have done so out of what might almost be called an abject desire to eliminate the expression 'British'. The same desire has been felt ... to eliminate this word before the term 'Commonwealth' ... Why is it, then, that we are so anxious, in the description of our own Monarch, in a title for use in this country, to eliminate any reference to the seat, the focus and the origin of this vast aggregate of territories? Why is it that this "teeming womb of royal Kings", as Shakespeare called it, wishes now to be anonymous?) (Note: Powell said that the answer was that because the British Nationality Act 1948 had removed allegiance to the crown as the basis of citizenship and replaced that with nine separate citizenships combined together by statute. Therefore, if any of these nine countries became republics, the law would not change, as happened with India when it became a republic. Furthermore, Powell went on, the essence of unity was "that all the parts recognise they would sacrifice themselves to the interests of the whole." He denied that there was in India that "recognition of belonging to a greater whole which involves the ultimate consequence in certain circumstances of self-sacrifice in the interests of the whole." Therefore, the title 'Head of the Commonwealth', the third major change, was "essentially a sham. They are essentially something which we have invented to blind ourselves to the reality of the position.") (Note: These changes were "greatly repugnant" to Powell: "if they are changes which were demanded by those who in many wars had fought with this country, by nations who maintained an allegiance to the Crown, and who signified a desire to be in the future as were in the past; if it were our friends who had come to us and said: "We want this," I would say: "Let it go. Let us admit the divisibility of the Crown. Let us sink into anonymity and cancel the word 'British' from our titles. If they like the conundrum 'Head of the Commonwealth' in the Royal style, let it be there." However, the underlying evil of this is that we are doing it for the sake not of our friends but of those who are not our friends. We are doing this for the sake of those to whom the very names 'Britain' and 'British' are repugnant. ... We are doing this for the sake of those who have deliberately cast off their allegiance to our common Monarchy.)

In mid-November 1953, Powell secured a place on the 1922 Committee's executive at the third attempt. Butler also invited him onto the committee that reviewed party policy for the general election, which he attended until 1955. Powell was a member of the Suez Group of MPs who were against the removal of British troops from the Suez Canal, because such a move would demonstrate, Powell argued, that Britain could no longer maintain a position there and that any claim to the Suez Canal would, therefore, be illogical. However, after the troops had left in June 1956 and the Egyptians nationalised the Canal a month later, Powell opposed the attempt to retake the canal in the Suez Crisis because he thought the British no longer had the resources to be a world power.

== In and out of office ==
=== Junior Housing Minister ===
On 21 December 1955, Powell was appointed parliamentary secretary to Duncan Sandys at the Ministry of Housing. In early 1956 he spoke for the Housing Subsidies Bill in the Commons and argued for the rejection of an amendment that would have hindered slum clearances. He also spoke in support of the Slum Clearances Bill, which provided entitlement for full compensation for those who purchased a house after August 1939 and still occupied it in December 1955 if this property would be compulsorily purchased by the government if it was deemed unfit for human habitation. In early 1956 Powell attended a subcommittee on immigration control as a housing minister and advocated immigration controls. (Note: In August, he gave a speech at a meeting of the Institute of Personnel Management and was asked a question about immigration. He answered that limiting immigration would require a change in the law: "There might be circumstances in which such a change of the law might be the lesser of two evils". But he added, "There would be very few people who would say the time had yet come when it was essential that so great a change should be made". Powell later told Paul Foot that the statement was made "out of loyalty to the Government line". Powell also spoke for the Rent Bill, which ended wartime rent controls when existing tenants moved out, thereby phasing out regulation.)

=== Financial Secretary to the Treasury ===
When Macmillan succeeded Eden as prime minister, Powell was offered the office of Financial Secretary to the Treasury on 14 January 1957. This office was the Chancellor of the Exchequer's deputy and the most important job outside the Cabinet. (Note: At a meeting of the 1922 Committee on 22 November 1956, Butler made a speech appealing for party unity in the aftermath of the Suez Crisis. His speech did not go down well and Harold Macmillan, whom Butler had taken along for moral support, addressed them and was a great success. In Powell's view this was "one of the most horrible things that I remember in politics ... seeing the way in which Harold Macmillan, with all the skill of the old actor-manager, succeeded in false-footing Rab. The sheer devilry of it verged upon the disgusting". After Macmillan's death in 1986, Powell said "Macmillan was a Whig, not a Tory ... he had no use for the Conservative loyalties and affections; they interfered too much with the Whig's true vocation of detecting trends in events and riding them skilfully so as to preserve the privileges, property and interests of his class".)

In January 1958, Powell resigned, along with the Chancellor of the Exchequer Peter Thorneycroft and his Treasury colleague Nigel Birch, in protest of government plans for increased expenditure; he was a staunch advocate of disinflation or, in modern terms, a monetarist and a believer in market forces. Powell was also a member of the Mont Pelerin Society. The by-product of this expenditure was the printing of extra money to pay for it all, which Powell believed to be the cause of inflation and, in effect, a form of taxation as the holders of money find their money is worth less. Retail price index inflation was between 3.7 and 3 per cent at the time of his resignation.

During the late 1950s, Powell promoted control of the money supply to prevent inflation and, during the 1960s, was an advocate of free market policies, which at the time were seen as extreme, unworkable and unpopular. Powell advocated the privatisation of the Post Office and the telephone network as early as 1964. He both scorned the idea of "consensus politics" and wanted the Conservative Party to become a modern business-like party, freed from its old aristocratic and "old boy network" associations. In his 1958 resignation over public spending and what he saw as an inflationary economic policy, he anticipated almost exactly the views that during the 1980s came to be described as "monetarism".

=== Hola Massacre speech ===
On 27 July 1959 Powell delivered a speech in the Commons about the Hola Camp in Kenya, where eleven Mau Mau were killed after refusing work in the camp. Powell noted that some MPs had described the eleven as "sub-human", but Powell responded by saying: "In general, I would say that it is a fearful doctrine, which must recoil upon the heads of those who pronounce it, to stand in judgement on a fellow human being and to say, 'Because he was such-and-such, therefore the consequences which would otherwise flow from his death shall not flow'." Powell also disagreed with the notion that because it was in Africa, different methods were acceptable:

Nor can we ourselves pick and choose where and in what parts of the world we shall use this or that kind of standard. We cannot say, "We will have African standards in Africa, Asian standards in Asia and perhaps British standards here at home". We have not that choice to make. We must be consistent with ourselves everywhere. All Government, all influence of man upon man, rests upon opinion. What we can do in Africa, where we still govern and where we no longer govern, depends upon the opinion which is entertained of the way in which this country acts and the way in which Englishmen act. We cannot, we dare not, in Africa of all places, fall below our own highest standards in the acceptance of responsibility.

Denis Healey, a member of Parliament from 1952 to 1992, later said this speech was "the greatest parliamentary speech I ever heard ... it had all the moral passion and rhetorical force of Demosthenes". The Daily Telegraph report of the speech said that "as Mr Powell sat down, he put his hand across his eyes. His emotion was justified, for he had made a great and sincere speech".

=== Minister of Health ===
Powell returned to the government in July 1960, when he was appointed Minister of Health, although he did not become a member of the Cabinet until the 1962 reshuffle. During a meeting with parents of babies that had been born with deformities caused by the drug thalidomide, he refused to meet any babies affected by the drug. Powell also refused to launch a public inquiry and resisted calls to issue a warning against any left-over thalidomide pills that might remain in people's medicine cabinets (as US President John F. Kennedy had done).

In December 1961, Powell, as health minister, introduced NHS prescription of the birth control pill Conovid at a subsidised price of 2 shillings per month.

Powell developed the 1962 Hospital Plan. He began a debate on the neglect of psychiatric institutions, calling for them to be replaced by wards in general hospitals. (Note: In his 1961 "Water Tower" speech, he said: "There they stand, isolated, majestic, imperious, brooded over by the gigantic water-tower and chimney combined, rising unmistakable and daunting out of the countryside—the asylums which our forefathers built with such immense solidity to express the notions of their day. Do not for a moment underestimate their powers of resistance to our assault. Let me describe some of the defences which we have to storm.") The speech catalysed debate. It was one of several strands that led to the Care in the Community initiative of the 1980s. In 1993, however, Powell stated that the criminally insane should have never been released and that the problem was one of funding. He said the new way of caring for the mentally ill cost more, not less, than the old way because community care was decentralised and intimate as well as being "more human"; and his successors had not, Powell stated, provided the money for local authorities to spend on mental health care. Institutional care had therefore been neglected and there was not investment in community care.

After his speech on immigration in 1968, Powell's political opponents sometimes alleged that he had, when Minister of Health, recruited immigrants from the Commonwealth into the NHS. However, the Minister of Health was not responsible for recruitment (this was left to health authorities). (Note: Sir George Godber, Chief Medical Officer for Her Majesty's Government in England from 1960 to 1973 (and for England and Wales from 1960 to 1969), stated that the allegation was "bunk ... absolute rubbish. There was no such policy".) (Note: Powell's biographer Simon Heffer also stated that the claim "is a complete untruth. As Powell's biographer I have been thoroughly through the Ministry of Health papers at the Public Record Office and have found no evidence to support this assertion".) (Note: During the early 1960s, Powell was asked about the recruitment of immigrant workers for the NHS. He replied by saying "recruitment was in the hands of the hospital authorities, but this was something that happened of its own accord given that there was no bar upon entry and employment in the United Kingdom to those from the West Indies or anywhere else [in the Commonwealth or colonies.") Lord Rippon of Hexham made the same accusation in April 1971 against Powell, as part of a campaign by the then Conservative Government to damage Powell who was the leading figure in opposition to joining the Common Market. Powell asked Rippon to supply evidence for his assertion. Rippon subsequently replied that he could not and gave Powell an apology.

Powell did welcome immigrant nurses and doctors, under the condition that they were to be temporary workers training in Britain and would then return to their native countries as qualified doctors or nurses. Shortly after becoming Minister of Health, Powell asked Rab Butler (the Home Secretary) whether he could be appointed to a ministerial committee that monitored immigration. Powell was worried about the strain caused by NHS immigrants, and papers show that he wanted a stronger restriction on Commonwealth immigration than that which was passed in 1961.

== 1960s ==
=== Leadership elections ===
In October 1963, along with Iain Macleod, Reginald Maudling and Quintin Hogg, Baron Hailsham of St Marylebone, Powell tried in vain to persuade Butler not to serve under the Earl of Home (soon to be known as Alec Douglas-Home), in the belief that the latter would be unable to form a government. Powell commented that they had given Butler a revolver, which he had refused to use in case it made a noise or hurt anyone. Macleod and Powell refused to serve in Lord Home's Cabinet. This refusal is not usually attributed to personal antipathy to Douglas-Home but rather to anger at what Macleod and Powell saw as Macmillan's underhand manipulation of colleagues during the process of choosing a new leader. However, at the meeting at his house on the evening of 17 October, Powell, who still enjoyed a liberal reputation on racial issues after his Hola Massacre Speech, reportedly said of Lord Home: "How can I serve under a man whose views on Africa are positively Portuguese?"

During the 1964 general election, Powell said in his election address, "it was essential, for the sake not only of our own people but of the immigrants themselves, to introduce control over the numbers allowed in. I am convinced that strict control must continue if we are to avoid the evils of a 'colour question' in this country, for ourselves and for our children". Norman Fowler, then a reporter for The Times, interviewed Powell during the election and asked him what the biggest issue was: "I expected to be told something about the cost of living but not a bit of it. 'Immigration,' replied Powell. I duly phoned in my piece but it was never used. After all, who in 1964 had ever heard of a former Conservative cabinet minister thinking that immigration was an important political issue?"

Following the Conservatives' defeat in the election, he agreed to return to the front bench as Transport Spokesman. In July 1965 he stood in the first-ever Conservative Party leadership election, but came a distant third to Edward Heath, obtaining only 15 votes, just below the result Hugh Fraser would gain in the 1975 contest. Heath appointed him Shadow Secretary of State for Defence. Powell said that he had "left his visiting card", i.e. demonstrated himself to be a potential future leader, but the immediate effect was to demonstrate his limited support in the Parliamentary Party, enabling Heath to feel more comfortable calling his bluff.

=== Shadow Defence Secretary ===
In his first speech to the Conservative Party Conference as Shadow Secretary of State for Defence on 14 October 1965, Powell outlined a fresh defence policy, jettisoning what he saw as outdated global military commitments left over from Britain's imperial past and stressing that Britain was a European power and therefore an alliance with Western European states from possible attack from the East was central to Britain's safety. He defended Britain's nuclear weapons and argued that it was "the merest casuistry to argue that if the weapon and the means of using it are purchased in part, or even altogether, from another nation, therefore the independent right to use it has no reality. With a weapon so catastrophic, it is possession and the right to use which count". Also, Powell called into question Western military commitments East of Suez:

However much we may do to safeguard and reassure the new independent countries in Asia and Africa, the eventual limits of Russian and Chinese advance in those directions will be fixed by a balance of forces which will itself be Asiatic and African. The two Communist empires are already in a state of mutual antagonism; but every advance or threat of advance by one or the other calls into existence countervailing forces, sometimes nationalist in character, sometimes expansionist, which will ultimately check it. We have to reckon with the harsh fact that the attainment of this eventual equilibrium of forces may at some point be delayed rather than hastened by Western military presence.

The Daily Telegraph journalist David Howell remarked to Andrew Alexander that Powell had "just withdrawn us from East of Suez, and received an enormous ovation because no-one understood what he was talking about". However, the Americans were worried by Powell's speech as they wanted British military commitments in South-East Asia as they were still fighting in Vietnam. A transcript of the speech was sent to Washington and the American embassy requested to talk to Heath about the "Powell doctrine". The New York Times said Powell's speech was "a potential declaration of independence from American policy". During the election campaign of 1966, Powell claimed that the British government had contingency plans to send at least a token British force to Vietnam and that, under Labour, "Britain has behaved perfectly clearly and perfectly recognisably as an American satellite".

It transpired that US President Lyndon B. Johnson had indeed asked prime minister Harold Wilson to send British forces for Vietnam. Powell learned later that Washington realised that public reaction to Powell's allegations made Wilson realise that any UK involvement in Vietnam would be deeply unpopular. After Wilson refused to join the USA's war, Powell responded: "The greatest service I have performed for my country, if that is so". Labour was returned to power with a large majority; Heath retained Powell as Shadow Defence Secretary as he believed he "was too dangerous to leave out".

In a speech on 26 May 1967, Powell criticised the UK's post-war world role:

In our imagination the vanishing last vestiges ... of Britain's once vast Indian Empire have transformed themselves into a peacekeeping role on which the sun never sets. Under God's good providence and in partnership with the United States, we keep the peace of the world and rush hither and thither containing Communism, putting out brush fires and coping with subversion. It is difficult to describe, without using terms derived from psychiatry, a notion having so few points of contact with reality.

In 1967, Powell spoke of his opposition to the immigration of Kenyan Asians to Britain after its leader Jomo Kenyatta's discriminatory policies led to the flight of Asians from that country.

The biggest argument Powell and Heath had during Powell's time in the Shadow Cabinet was over a dispute over the role of Black Rod, who would go to the Commons to summon them to the Lords to hear the Royal Assent of Bills. In November 1967 Black Rod arrived during a debate on the EEC and was met with cries of "Shame" to "'Op it". At the next Shadow Cabinet meeting Heath said this "nonsense" must be stopped. Powell suggested that Heath did not mean it should be ended. He asked whether Heath realised that the words Black Rod used went back to the 1307 Parliament of Carlisle and were ancient even then. Heath reacted furiously, saying that the British people "were tired of this nonsense and ceremonial and mummery. He would not stand for the perpetuation of this ridiculous business etc [sic]".

== National figure ==
=== 1968 "Rivers of Blood" speech ===
After the Birmingham-based television company ATV saw an advance copy of the speech on the Saturday morning, its news editor ordered a television crew to go to the venue, where they filmed sections of the speech. Earlier in the week, Powell said to his friend Clement 'Clem' Jones, a journalist and then editor at the Wolverhampton Express & Star, "I'm going to make a speech at the weekend and it's going to go up 'fizz' like a rocket; but whereas all rockets fall to the earth, this one is going to stay up."

Powell was renowned for his oratorical skills and his maverick nature. On 20 April 1968, he gave a speech in Birmingham in which he warned his audience of what he believed would be the consequences of continued unchecked mass immigration from the Commonwealth to Britain. Above all, it is an allusion to the ancient Roman poet Virgil towards the end of the speech which has been remembered, giving the speech its colloquial name:

As I look ahead, I am filled with foreboding. Like the Roman, I seem to see 'the River Tiber foaming with much blood'. That tragic and intractable phenomenon which we watch with horror on the other side of the Atlantic but which there is interwoven with the history and existence of the States itself, is coming upon us here by our own volition and our own neglect. Indeed, it has all but come. In numerical terms, it will be of American proportions long before the end of the 20th century. Only resolute and urgent action will avert it even now. Whether there will be the public will to demand and obtain that action, I do not know. All I know is that to see, and not to speak, would be the great betrayal.

The Times declared it "an evil speech", stating, "This is the first time that a serious British politician has appealed to racial hatred in this direct way in our postwar history."

The main political issue addressed by the speech was not immigration as such, however. It was the introduction of the Race Relations Act 1968 (by the Labour government at the time), which Powell found offensive and immoral. The Act would prohibit discrimination on the grounds of race in certain areas of British life, particularly housing, where many local authorities had been refusing to provide houses for immigrant families until they had lived in the country for a certain number of years.

One feature of his speech was the extensive quotation of a letter he received detailing the experiences of one of his constituents in Wolverhampton. The writer described the fate of an elderly woman who was supposedly the last White person living in her street. She had repeatedly refused applications from non-Whites requiring rooms-to-let, which resulted in her being called a "racialist" outside her home and receiving "excreta" through her letterbox. Powell's critics suspected him of fabricating some of his stories, and days after the speech Ann Dummett said she'd recently heard a story in which "almost every circumstantial detail was the same" as Powell's, except the widow was in London. More recent research has identified incorrect details within the story.

When Heath telephoned Margaret Thatcher to tell her that he was going to sack Powell, she responded: "I really thought that it was better to let things cool down for the present rather than heighten the crisis". Heath sacked Powell from his shadow cabinet the day after the speech, and Powell never held another senior political office. Powell received almost 120,000 (predominantly positive) letters and a Gallup poll at the end of April showed that 74 per cent of those asked agreed with his speech and only 15 per cent disagreed, with 11 per cent unsure. One poll concluded that between 61 and 73 per cent disagreed with Heath sacking Powell. According to George L. Bernstein, many British people felt that Powell "was the first British politician who was actually listening to them". Appearing on Desert Island Discs (with Sue Lawley) in 1989, Powell said that Heath was objecting only to the tone of the speech, since the content was pure Tory immigration policy. Powell then added that Heath was a musician who understood "tone".

After The Sunday Times branded his speeches "racialist", Powell sued them for libel, but withdrew when he was required to provide the letters he had quoted from because he had promised anonymity for the writer, who refused to waive it.

Following the "Rivers of Blood" speech, Powell was transformed into a national public figure and won huge support across Britain. Three days after the speech, on 23 April, as the Race Relations Bill was being debated in the Commons, 1,000 dockers marched on Westminster protesting against the "victimisation" of Powell, with slogans such as "we want Enoch Powell!" and "Enoch here, Enoch there, we want Enoch everywhere". The next day, 400 meat porters from Smithfield market handed in a 92-page petition in support of Powell, amidst other mass demonstrations of working-class support, much of it from trade unionists, in London and Wolverhampton.

The Conservative politician Michael Heseltine (the future deputy prime minister under John Major) stated that in the aftermath of the speech that if Powell had stood for leadership of the Conservative Party he would have won "by a landslide" and if he had stood to be prime minister he would have won by a "national landslide".

=== 'Morecambe Budget' ===
Powell made a speech in the town of Morecambe on 11 October 1968 on the economy, setting out alternative, radical free-market policies that would later be called the 'Morecambe Budget'. Powell used the financial year of 1968–69 to show how income tax could be halved from 8s 3d to 4s 3d in the pound (basic rate cut from 41 to 21 per cent) and how capital gains tax and Selective Employment Tax could be abolished without reducing expenditure on defence or the social services. These tax reductions required a saving of £2,855,000,000 and this would be funded by eradicating losses in the nationalised industries and privatising the profit-making state concerns; ending all housing subsidies except for those who could not afford their own housing; ending all foreign aid; ending all grants and subsidies in agriculture; ending all assistance to development areas; ending all investment grants; and abolishing the National Economic Development Council and the Prices and Incomes Board. The cuts in taxation would also allow the state to borrow from the public to spend on capital projects such as hospitals and roads and spend on "the firm and humane treatment of criminals".

=== House of Lords reform ===
In mid-1968, Powell's book The House of Lords in the Middle Ages was published after twenty years' work. At the press conference for its publication, Powell said if the government introduced a Bill to reform the House of Lords he would be its "resolute enemy". Later in 1968, when the Labour government published its Bills for the new session, Powell was angry at Heath's acceptance of the plan drawn up by the Conservative Iain Macleod and Labour's Richard Crossman to reform the Lords, titled the Parliament (No. 2) Bill. Crossman, opening the debate on 19 November, said the government would reform the Lords in five ways: removing the voting rights of hereditary peers; making sure no party had a permanent majority; ensuring the government of the day usually passed its laws; weakening the Lords' powers to delay new laws; and abolishing the power to refuse subordinate legislation if it had been passed by the Commons. Powell spoke in the debate, opposing these plans. He said the reforms were "unnecessary and undesirable" and that there was no weight in the claim that the Lords could "check or frustrate the firm intentions" of the Commons.

Powell said that only election or nomination could replace the hereditary nature of the Lords. If they were elected, it would pose the dilemma of which House was truly representative of the electorate. He also had another objection: "How can the same electorate be represented in two ways so that the two sets of representatives can conflict and disagree with one another?" Those nominated would be bound to the Chief Whip of their party through a sort of oath. Powell asked: "what sort of men and women are they to be who would submit to be nominated to another chamber upon condition that they will be mere dummies, automatic parts of a voting machine?" He also stated that the inclusion in the proposals of thirty crossbenchers was "a grand absurdity", because they would have been chosen "upon the very basis that they have no strong views of principle on the way in which the country ought to be governed".

Powell said the Lords derived their authority not from a strict hereditary system but from its prescriptive nature: "It has long been so, and it works". He then added that there was not any widespread desire for reform: he indicated a recent survey of working-class voters that showed that only one-third of them wanted to reform or abolish the House of Lords, with another third believing the Lords were an "intrinsic part of the national traditions of Britain". Powell deduced from this, "As so often, the ordinary rank and file of the electorate have seen a truth, an important fact, which has escaped so many more clever people—the underlying value of that which is traditional, that which is prescriptive".

Following more speeches against the bill during early 1969, and faced with the fact that a bloc of left-wing Labour members were also against reforming the Lords as they desired its abolition altogether, Wilson withdrew the bill on 17 April. Wilson's statement was brief and Powell intervened, "Don't eat them too quickly", which provoked much laughter in the chamber. Later that day Powell said in a speech to the Primrose League:

There was an instinct, inarticulate but deep and sound, that the traditional, prescriptive House of Lords posed no threat and injured no interests, but might yet, for all its illogicalities and anomalies, make itself felt on occasion to useful purpose. The same sound instinct was repelled by the idea of a new-fashioned second chamber, artificially constructed by power, party, and patronage, to function in a particular way. Not for the first time, the common people of this country proved the surest defenders of their traditional institutions.

The biographer Simon Heffer described the defeat of Lords reform as "perhaps the greatest triumph of Powell's political career".

=== Membership to the European Economic Community ===
In 1961, Conservative Prime Minister Harold Macmillan applied for Britain to join the European Economic Community. Powell, a supporter of free-market economic policies, supported the application for British membership, seeing it as a path towards the liberalisation of British economy. Examining more closely the structure and workings of the EEC, Powell came to believe that joining the EEC would extinguish Britain's ability to function as a self-governing nation. He stated that the question of British membership into the EEC "must be the question which subtends all others...for – in peace as in war, it is the great, the ultimate, question for any nation".

The EEC membership issue eventually caused Powell to leave the Conservative Party on 23 February 1974, less than week before the general election, condemning Conservative Prime Minister, Edward Heath, for taking Britain into the EEC on 1 January 1973 without a specific electoral mandate from the British voters to proceed in that path. Following his resignation, Powell then shocked his former Conservative colleagues, as well as the opposition, by calling on the public to vote for the Labour Party, on the basis that the Labour leadership had proposed a referendum on Britain's EEC membership.

=== Departure from the Conservative Party ===
A Gallup poll in February 1969 showed Powell to be the "most admired person" in British public opinion.

In a defence debate in March 1970, Powell said that "the whole theory of the tactical nuclear weapon, or the tactical use of nuclear weapons, is an unmitigated absurdity" and that it was "remotely improbable" that any group of nations engaged in war would "decide upon general and mutual suicide", and advocated enlargement of the UK's conventional forces. However, when his fellow Conservative Julian Amery later in the debate criticised Powell for his anti-nuclear pronouncements, Powell responded: "I have always regarded the possession of the nuclear capability as a protection against nuclear blackmail. It is a protection against being threatened with nuclear weapons. What it is not a protection against is war".

The 1970 general election took place on 18 June and was unexpectedly won by the Conservatives, with a late surge in their support. Powell's supporters claim that he contributed to this surprise victory. In "exhaustive research" on the election, the American pollster Douglas Schoen and University of Oxford academic R. W. Johnson believed it "beyond dispute" that Powell had attracted 2.5 million votes to the Conservatives, but the Conservative vote had increased by only 1.7 million since 1966. However, the Conservative victory was reportedly not to Powell's advantage, who, according to friends, "sat in his head in his hands" for many days afterwards.

Powell had voted against the Schuman Declaration in 1950 and had supported entry into the European Coal and Steel Community only because he believed that it was simply a means to secure free trade. In March 1969 he opposed Britain's joining the European Economic Community. Opposition to entry had hitherto been confined largely to the Labour Party but now, he said, it was clear to him that the sovereignty of Parliament was in question, as was the UK's very survival as a nation. This nationalist analysis attracted millions of middle-class Conservatives and others, and as much as anything else it made Powell the implacable enemy of Heath, a fervent pro-European; but there was already enmity between the two.

During 1970, Powell gave speeches about the EEC in Lyon (in French), Frankfurt (in German), Turin (in Italian) and The Hague.

The Conservatives had promised at the 1970 general election in relation to the Common Market, "Our sole commitment is to negotiate; no more, no less." The second reading of the Bill to put the Treaty into law was passed by just eight votes and Powell declared his hostility to his party's line. He voted against the government on every one of the 104 divisions in the course of the European Communities Bill. When Britain finally entered the EEC in January 1973, after three years of campaigning on the question, he decided he could no longer sit in a parliament that he believed was no longer sovereign.

A Daily Express opinion poll in 1972 showed Powell to be the most popular politician in the country. In mid-1972, he prepared to resign the Conservative whip and changed his mind only because of fears of a renewed wave of immigration from Uganda after the accession of Idi Amin, who had expelled Uganda's Asian residents. He decided to remain in parliament and in the Conservative Party, and was expected to support the party in Wolverhampton at the snap general election of February 1974 called by Edward Heath. However, on 23 February 1974, with the election only five days away, Powell dramatically turned his back on his party, giving as the reasons that it had taken the United Kingdom into the EEC without having a mandate to do so, and that it had abandoned other manifesto commitments, so that he could no longer support it at the election. The monetarist economist Milton Friedman sent Powell a letter praising him as principled, and notably, there was a breakaway faction of the Conservative Party in Gloucester which selected a candidate who stood under the party name of "Powell Conservative", securing 366 votes, 0.7 per cent of the overall vote share in the constituency. There was also a candidate listed in the neighbouring constituency of Stroud who obtained 470 votes, 0.8 per cent of the overall vote share in the constituency.

Powell had arranged for his friend Andrew Alexander to talk to Joe Haines, the press secretary of the Labour leader Harold Wilson, about the timing of Powell's speeches against Heath. Powell had been talking to Wilson irregularly since June 1973 during chance meetings in the gentlemen's lavatories of the "aye" lobby in the House of Commons. Wilson and Haines had ensured that Powell would dominate the newspapers of the Sunday and Monday before election day by having no Labour frontbencher give a major speech on 23 February, the day of Powell's speech. Powell gave this speech at the Mecca Dance Hall in the Bull Ring, Birmingham, to an audience of 1,500, with some press reports estimating that 7,000 more had to be turned away. Powell said the issue of British membership of the EEC was one where "if there be a conflict between the call of country and that of party, the call of country must come first":

Curiously, it so happens that the question "Who governs Britain?" which at the moment is being frivolously posed, might be taken, in real earnest, as the title of what I have to say. This is the first and last election at which the British people will be given the opportunity to decide whether their country is to remain a democratic nation, governed by the will of its own electorate expressed in its own Parliament, or whether it will become one province in a new European superstate under institutions which know nothing of the political rights and liberties that we have so long taken for granted.

Powell went on to criticise the Conservative government for obtaining British membership despite the party having promised at the general election of 1970 that it would "negotiate: no more, no less" and that "the full-hearted consent of Parliament and people" would be needed if the UK were to join. He also denounced Heath for accusing his political opponents of lacking respect for Parliament while also being "the first Prime Minister in three hundred years who entertained, let alone executed, the intention of depriving Parliament of its sole right to make the laws and impose the taxes of this country". He then advocated a vote for the Labour Party:

The question is: can they now be prevented from taking back into their own hands the decision about their identity and their form of government which truly was theirs all along? I do not believe they can be prevented: for they are now, at a general election, provided with a clear, definite and practicable alternative, namely, a fundamental renegotiation directed to regain free access to world food markets and recover or retain the powers of Parliament, a renegotiation to be followed in any event by a specific submission of the outcome to the electorate, a renegotiation protected by an immediate moratorium or stop on all further integration of the UK into the Community. This alternative is offered, as such an alternative must be in our parliamentary democracy, by a political party capable of securing a majority in the House of Commons and sustaining a Government.

This call to vote Labour surprised some of Powell's supporters who were more concerned with beating socialism than the supposed loss of national independence. On 25 February he made another speech at Shipley, again urging a vote for Labour, saying he did not believe the claim that Wilson would renege on his commitment to renegotiation, which Powell believed was ironic because of Heath's premiership: "In acrobatics Harold Wilson, for all his nimbleness and skill, is simply no match for the breathtaking, thoroughgoing efficiency of the present Prime Minister". At this moment a heckler shouted "Judas!" Powell responded: "Judas was paid! Judas was paid! I am making a sacrifice!" Later in the speech Powell said, "I was born a Tory, am a Tory and shall die a Tory. It is part of me ... it is something I cannot alter". Later in life, in 1987, Powell said there was no contradiction between urging people to vote Labour while proclaiming to be a Tory: "Many Labour members are quite good Tories".

Powell, in an interview on 26 February, said he would be voting for Helene Middleweek, the Labour candidate, rather than the Conservative Nicholas Budgen. Powell did not stay up on election night to watch the results on television. When on 1 March he saw the headline in 'The Times "Mr Heath's general election gamble fails", he reacted by singing the Te Deum. He later said: "I had had my revenge on the man who had destroyed the self-government of the United Kingdom". The election result was a hung parliament. Although the Conservatives had won the most votes, Labour finished five seats ahead of them. The national swing to Labour was 1 per cent; 4 per cent in Powell's heartland, the West Midlands conurbation; and 16 per cent in his old constituency (although Budgen won the seat). According to Powell biographer Simon Heffer, both Powell and Heath believed that Powell had been responsible for the Conservatives' losing the election.

== Ulster Unionist ==
=== 1974–1979 ===
In a sudden general election in October 1974, Powell returned to Parliament as Ulster Unionist (UUP) MP for South Down, having rejected an offer to stand as a candidate for the far-right National Front, formed seven years earlier and fiercely opposed to non-white immigration. He repeated his call to vote Labour because of their policy on the EEC.

From 1968 onward, Powell became an increasingly frequent visitor to Northern Ireland and, in keeping with his general British nationalist viewpoint, sided strongly with the Ulster Unionists in their desire to remain a constituent part of the United Kingdom. From early 1971 he opposed, with increasing vehemence, Heath's approach to Northern Ireland, the greatest breach with his party coming over the imposition of direct rule in 1972. He strongly believed that it would survive only if the Unionists strove to integrate completely with the United Kingdom by abandoning devolved rule in Northern Ireland. He refused to join the Orange Order, the first Ulster Unionist MP at Westminster never to be a member (and, to date, one of only four, the others being Ken Maginnis, Danny Kinahan and Lady Hermon), and he was an outspoken opponent of the more extremist loyalism espoused by Ian Paisley and his supporters.

In the aftermath of the Birmingham pub bombings by the Provisional Irish Republican Army (IRA) on 21 November 1974, the government passed the Prevention of Terrorism Act. During its second reading, Powell warned of passing legislation "in haste and under the immediate pressure of indignation on matters which touch the fundamental liberties of the subject; for both haste and anger are ill counsellors, especially when one is legislating for the rights of the subject". He said terrorism was a form of warfare that could not be prevented by laws and punishments but by the aggressor's certainty that the war was impossible to win.

When Heath called a leadership election at the end of 1974, Powell claimed they would have to find someone who was not a member of the Cabinet that "without a single resignation or public dissent, not merely swallowed but advocated every single reversal of election pledge or party principle". During February 1975, after winning the leadership election, Margaret Thatcher refused to offer Powell a Shadow Cabinet place because "he turned his back on his own people" by leaving the Conservative Party exactly 12 months earlier and telling the public to vote Labour. Powell replied she was correct to exclude him: "In the first place I am not a member of the Conservative Party and secondly, until the Conservative Party has worked its passage a very long way it will not be rejoining me". Powell also attributed Thatcher's success to luck, saying that she was faced with "supremely unattractive opponents at the time".

During the 1975 referendum on British membership of the EEC, Powell campaigned for a 'No' vote. Powell was one of the few prominent supporters of the 'No' camp, with Michael Foot, Tony Benn, Peter Shore and Barbara Castle. The electorate voted 'Yes' by a margin of more than two to one.

On 23 March 1977, in a vote of confidence against the minority Labour government, Powell, along with a few other Ulster Unionists, abstained. The government won by 322 votes to 298 and remained in power for another two years.

Powell said that the only way to stop the Provisional Irish Republican Army was for Northern Ireland to be an integral part of Britain, treated the same as any other of its constituent parts. He said the ambiguous nature of the region's status, with its own parliament and prime minister, gave hope to the IRA that it could be detached from the rest of Britain:

Every word or act which holds out the prospect that their unity with the rest of the United Kingdom might be negotiable is itself, consciously or unconsciously, a contributory cause to the continuation of violence in Northern Ireland.

Nonetheless, in the 1987 general election that he lost, Powell campaigned in Bangor for Jim Kilfedder, the devolutionist North Down Ulster Popular Unionist Party MP, and against Bob McCartney, who was standing as a Real Unionist on a policy of integration and equal citizenship for Northern Ireland.

In Powell's later career as an Ulster Unionist MP, he continued to criticise the United States and stated that the Americans were trying to persuade the British to surrender Northern Ireland into an all-Ireland state because the condition for the Republic of Ireland's membership of NATO, Powell said, was Northern Ireland. The Americans wanted to close the 'yawning gap' in NATO defence that was the Republic of Ireland's coast to northern Spain. Powell had a copy of a US State Department Policy Statement from 15 August 1950, in which the American federal government said that the "agitation" caused by partition in Ireland "lessens the usefulness of Ireland in international organisations and complicates strategic planning for Europe". "It is desirable", the document continued, "that Ireland should be integrated into the defence planning of the North Atlantic area, for its strategic position and present lack of defensive capacity are matters of significance."

Though he voted with the Conservatives in a vote of confidence that brought down the Labour government on 28 March, Powell did not welcome Thatcher's victory in the 1979 general election. "Grim" was Powell's response when he was asked what he thought of it, because he believed she would renege like Heath did in 1972. During the election campaign Thatcher, when questioned, again repeated her vow that there would be no position for Powell in her Cabinet if the Conservatives won. In the days following the election, Powell wrote to James Callaghan to commiserate on his defeat, pay tribute to his premiership and to wish him well.

=== 1979–1982 ===
Following a riot in Bristol in 1980, Powell stated that the media were ignoring similar events in south London and Birmingham: "Far less than the foreseeable New Commonwealth and Pakistan ethnic proportion would be sufficient to constitute a dominant political force in the United Kingdom able to extract from a government and the main parties terms calculated to render its influence still more impregnable. Far less than this proportion would provide the bases and citadels for urban terrorism, which would in turn reinforce the overt political leverage of simple numbers". He criticised "the false nostrums and promises of those who apparently monopolise the channels of communication. Who then is likely to listen, let alone to respond, to the proof that nothing short of major movements of population can shift the lines along which we are being carried towards disaster?"

In the 1980s Powell began espousing the policy of unilateral nuclear disarmament. In a debate on the nuclear deterrent on 3 March 1981 Powell claimed that the debate was now more political than military; that Britain did not possess an independent deterrent and that through NATO, Britain was tied to the nuclear deterrence theory of the US. In the debate on the address shortly after the general election of 1983, Powell picked up on Thatcher's willingness, when asked, to use nuclear weapons as a "last resort". Powell presented a scenario of what he thought the last resort would be, namely that the Soviet Union would be ready to invade Britain and had used a nuclear weapon on somewhere such as Rockall to demonstrate their willingness to use it:

What would the United Kingdom do? Would it discharge Polaris, Trident or whatever against the main centres of population of the Continent of Europe or in European Russia? If so, what would be the consequence? The consequence would not be that we should survive, that we should repel our antagonist—nor would it be that we should escape defeat. The consequence would be that we would make certain, as far as is humanly possible, the virtual destruction and elimination of the hope of the future in these islands. ... I would much sooner that the power to use it was not in the hands of any individual in this country at all.

Powell went on to say that if the Soviet invasion had already begun and Britain resorted to a retaliatory strike, the results would be the same: "We should be condemning, not merely to death, but as near as may be the non-existence of our population". To Powell, an invasion would take place with or without Britain's nuclear weapons and therefore there was no point in retaining them. He said that after years of consideration, he had come to the conclusion that there were no "rational grounds on which the deformation of our defence preparations in the United Kingdom by our determination to maintain a current independent nuclear deterrent can be justified".

John Casey records an exchange between Powell and Thatcher during a meeting of the Conservative Philosophy Group:

Edward Norman (then Dean of Peterhouse) had attempted to mount a Christian argument for nuclear weapons. The discussion moved on to "Western values". Mrs Thatcher said (in effect) that Norman had shown that the Bomb was necessary for the defence of our values. Powell: "No, we do not fight for values. I would fight for this country even if it had a communist government." Thatcher (it was just before the Argentinian invasion of the Falklands): "Nonsense, Enoch. If I send British troops abroad, it will be to defend our values." "No, Prime Minister, values exist in a transcendental realm, beyond space and time. They can neither be fought for, nor destroyed." Mrs Thatcher looked utterly baffled. She had just been presented with the difference between Toryism and American Republicanism.

On 28 March 1981, Powell gave a speech to Ashton-under-Lyne Young Conservatives where he criticised the "conspiracy of silence" between the government and the opposition over the prospective growth through births of the immigration population: "'We have seen nothing yet' is a phrase that we could with advantage repeat to ourselves whenever we try to form a picture of that future". He also criticised those who believed it was "too late to do anything" and that "there lies the certainty of violence on a scale which can only adequately be described as civil war". He also said that the solution was "a reduction in prospective numbers as would represent re-emigration hardly less massive than the immigration which occurred in the first place". The Shadow Home Secretary, Labour MP Roy Hattersley, criticised Powell for using "Munich beer-hall language". On 11 April there was a riot in Brixton, and when on 13 April an interviewer quoted to Thatcher Powell's remark that "We have seen nothing yet", she replied: "I heard him say that and I thought it was a very very alarming remark. And I hope with all my heart that it isn't true".

In July a riot took place in Toxteth, Liverpool. On 16 July 1981 Powell gave a speech in the Commons in which he said the riots could not be understood unless one takes into consideration the fact that in some large cities, between a quarter and a half of those under 25 were immigrants or descended from immigrants. He read out a letter he had received from a member of the public about immigration that included the line: "As they continue to multiply and as we can't retreat further there must be conflict". The Labour MP Martin Flannery intervened, saying Powell was making "a National Front speech". Powell predicted "inner London becoming ungovernable or violence which could only effectively be described as civil war", and Flannery intervened again to ask what he knew about inner cities.

Powell replied: "I was a Member for Wolverhampton for a quarter of a century. What I saw in those early years of the development of this problem in Wolverhampton has made it impossible for me ever to dissociate myself from this gigantic and tragic problem". He also criticised the view that the causes of the riots were economic: "Are we seriously saying that so long as there is poverty, unemployment and deprivation our cities will be torn to pieces, that the police in them will be the objects of attack and that we shall destroy our own environment? Of course not". Dame Judith Hart attacked his speech as "an evil incitement to riot". Powell replied: "I am within the judgment of the House, as I am within the judgment of the people of this country, and I am content to stand before either tribunal".

After the Scarman Report on the riots was published, Powell gave a speech on 10 December in the Commons. Powell disagreed with Scarman, as the report stated that the black community was alienated because it was economically disadvantaged. Powell instead argued that the black community was alienated because it was alien. He said tensions would worsen because the non-white population was growing: whereas in Lambeth it was 25 per cent, of those of secondary school age it was 40 per cent. Powell said that the government should be honest to the people by telling them that in thirty years' time, the black population of Lambeth would have doubled in size.

=== Falklands conflict ===
When the Falkland Islands were invaded by Argentina in April 1982, Powell was given secret briefings on Privy Counsellor terms on behalf of his party. On 3 April Powell said in the Commons that the time for inquests on the government's failure to protect the Falklands would come later and that although it was right to put the issue before the United Nations, Britain should not wait upon that organisation to deliberate but use forceful action now. He then turned to face Thatcher: "The Prime Minister, shortly after she came into office, received a soubriquet as the "Iron Lady". It arose in the context of remarks which she made about defence against the Soviet Union and its allies; but there was no reason to suppose that the right hon. Lady did not welcome and, indeed, take pride in that description. In the next week or two this House, the nation and the right hon. Lady herself will learn of what metal she is made." According to Thatcher's friends this had a "devastating impact" on her and encouraged her resolve.

On 14 April, in the Commons, Powell said: "it is difficult to fault the military and especially the naval measures which the Government have taken". He added: "We are in some danger of resting our position too exclusively upon the existence, the nature and the wishes of the inhabitants of the Falkland Islands ... if the population of the Falkland Islands did not desire to be British, the principle that the Queen wishes no unwilling subjects would long ago have prevailed; but we should create great difficulties for ourselves in other contexts, as well as in this context, if we rested our action purely and exclusively on the notion of restoring tolerable, acceptable conditions and self-determination to our fellow Britons on the Falkland Islands. ... I do not think that we need be too nice about saying that we defend our territory as well as our people. There is nothing irrational, nothing to be ashamed of, in doing that. Indeed, it is impossible in the last resort to distinguish between the defence of territory and the defence of people".

Powell also criticised the United Nations Security Council's resolution calling for a "peaceful solution". He said that while he wanted a peaceful solution, the resolution's meaning "seems to be of a negotiated settlement or compromise between two incompatible positions—between the position which exists in international law, that the Falkland Islands and their dependencies are British sovereign territory and some other position altogether ... It cannot be meant that one country has only to seize the territory of another country for the nations of the world to say that some middle position must be found. ... If that were the meaning of the resolution of the Security Council, the charter of the United Nations would not be a charter of peace; it would be a pirates' charter. It would mean that any claim anywhere in the world had only to be pursued by force and points would immediately be gained and a bargaining position established by the aggressor".

On 28 April, Powell spoke in the Commons against the Northern Ireland Secretary's (Jim Prior) plans for devolution to a power-sharing assembly in Northern Ireland: "We assured the people of the Falkland Islands that there should be no change in their status without their agreement. Yet at the very same time that those assurances were being repeated, the actions of the Government and their representatives elsewhere were belying or contradicting those assurances and showing that part at any rate of the Government was looking to a very different outcome that could not be approved by the people of the islands. Essentially, exactly the same has happened over the years to Northern Ireland". He further said that power-sharing was a negation of democracy.

The next day Powell disagreed with the Labour Party leader Michael Foot's claim that the British government was acting under the authority of the United Nations: "The right of self-defence—to repel aggression and to expel an invader from one's territory and one's people whom he has occupied and taken captive—is, as the Government have said, an inherent right. It is one which existed before the United Nations was dreamt of".

On 13 May, Powell said the task force was sent "to repossess the Falkland Islands, to restore British administration of the islands and to ensure that the decisive factor in the future of the islands should be the wishes of the inhabitants" but the Foreign Secretary (Francis Pym) desired an "interim agreement": "So far as I understand that interim agreement, it is in breach, if not in contradiction, of each of the three objects with which the task force was dispatched to the South Atlantic. There was to be a complete and supervised withdrawal of Argentine forces... matched by corresponding withdrawal of British forces. There is no withdrawal of British force that 'corresponds' to the withdrawal from the territory of the islands of those who have unlawfully occupied them. We have a right to be there; those are our waters, the territory is ours and we have the right to sail the oceans with our fleets whenever we think fit. So the whole notion of a 'corresponding withdrawal', a withdrawal of the only force which can possibly restore the position, which can possibly ensure any of the objectives which have been talked about on either side of the House, is in contradiction of the determination to repossess the Falklands".

After British forces successfully recaptured the Falklands, Powell asked Thatcher in the Commons on 17 June, recalling his statement to her of 3 April: "Is the right hon. Lady aware that the report has now been received from the public analyst on a certain substance recently subjected to analysis and that I have obtained a copy of the report? It shows that the substance under test consisted of ferrous matter of the highest quality, that it is of exceptional tensile strength, is highly resistant to wear and tear and to stress, and may be used with advantage for all national purposes?" She replied, "I think that I am very grateful indeed to the right hon. Gentleman. I agree with every word that he said". Their mutual friend Ian Gow printed and framed this and the original question and presented it to Thatcher, who hung it in her office.

Powell wrote an article for The Times on 29 June in which he said: "The Falklands have brought to the surface of the British mind our latent perception of ourselves as a sea animal. ... No assault on a landward possession would have evoked the same automatic defiance, tinged with a touch of that self sufficiency which belongs to all nations". The United States' response was "very different but just as deep an instinctual reaction ... the United States have an almost neurotic sense of vulnerability ... its two coastlines, its two theatres, its two navies are separated by the entire length of the New World ... she lives with ... the nightmare of having one day to fight a decisive sea battle without the benefit of concentration, the perpetual spectre of naval 'war on two fronts'." Powell added: "The Panama Canal from 1914 onwards could never quite exorcise the spectre. ... It was the position of the Falkland Islands in relation to that route which gave and gives them their significance—for the United States above all. The British people have become uneasily aware that their American allies would prefer the Falkland Islands to pass out of Britain's possession into hands which, if not wholly American, might be amenable to American control. In fact, the American struggle to wrest the islands from Britain has only commenced in earnest now that the fighting is over". Powell then said there was "the Hispanic factor": "If we could gather together all the anxieties for the future which in Britain cluster around race relations ... and then attribute them, translated into Hispanic terms, to the Americans, we would have something of the phobias which haunt the United States and addressed itself to the aftermath of the Falklands campaign".

Writing in The Guardian on 18 October, Powell said that due to the Falklands War, "Britain no longer looked upon itself and the world through American spectacles" and the view was "more rational; and it was more congenial; for, after all, it was our own view". He quoted an observation that Americans thought their country was "a unique society ... where God has put together all nationalities, races and interests of the globe for one purpose—to show the rest of the world how to live". He denounced the "manic exaltation of the American illusion" and compared it to the "American nightmare". Powell also disliked the American belief that "they are authorised, possibly by the deity, to intervene, openly or covertly, in the internal affairs of other countries anywhere in the world". The UK should dissociate herself from American intervention in the Lebanon: "It is not in Britain's self-interest alone that Britain should once again assert her own position. A world in which the American myth and the American nightmare go unchallenged by question or by contradiction is not a world as safe or as peaceable as human reason, prudence and realism can make it".

Speaking to the Aldershot and North Hants Conservative Association on 4 February 1983, Powell blamed the United Nations for the Falklands War by the General Assembly resolution of December 1967 that stated "its gratitude for the continuous efforts made by the Government of Argentina to facilitate the process of decolonisation" and further called on the UK and Argentina to negotiate. Powell said that "it would be difficult to imagine a more cynically wicked or criminally absurd or insultingly provocative action". As 102 had voted for this resolution, with only the UK voting against it (with 32 abstentions), he said it was not surprising that Argentina had continually threatened the UK until this threatening turned into aggression: "It is with the United Nations that the guilt lies for the breach of the peace and the bloodshed". The UN knew that no international forum had ruled against British possession of the Falklands but had voted its gratitude to Argentina who wanted to annexe the Islands from their rightful owners. It was therefore "disgraceful" for Britain to belong to such a body that engaged in "pure spite for spite's sake against the United Kingdom": "We were, and are, the victims of our own insincerity. For over thirty years we have sanctimoniously and dishonestly pretended respect, if not awe, for an organisation which all the time we knew was a monstrous and farcical humbug. ... The moral is to cease to engage in humbug, which almost all have happily and self-righteously engaged in for a generation".

=== 1983 general election ===
In an article for the Sunday Telegraph on 3 April, Powell expressed his opposition to the Labour Party's manifesto pledge to outlaw fox hunting. He claimed that angling was much crueller and that it was just as logical to ban the boiling of live lobsters or eating live oysters. The ceremonial part of fox hunting was "a side of our national character which is deeply antipathetic to the Labour party". At the 1983 general election Powell had to face a DUP candidate in his constituency and Ian Paisley denounced Powell as "a foreigner and an Anglo-Catholic".

On 31 May, Powell gave a speech at Downpatrick against nuclear weapons. Powell said that war could not be banished because "War is implicit in the human condition". The "true case against the nuclear weapon is the nightmarish unreality and criminal levity of the grounds upon which its acquisition and multiplication are advocated and defended". Thatcher had claimed nuclear weapons were our defence "of last resort". Powell said he supposed this to mean "that the Soviet Union, which seems always to be assumed to be the enemy in question, proved so victorious in a war of aggression in Europe as to stand upon the verge of invading these islands. ... Suppose further, because this is necessary to the alleged case for our nuclear weapon as the defence of last resort, that, as in 1940, the United States was standing aloof from the contest but that, in contrast with 1940, Britain and the Warsaw Pact respectively possessed the nuclear weaponry which they do today. Such must surely be the sort of scene in which the Prime Minister is asserting that Britain would be saved by possession of her present nuclear armament. I can only say: 'One must be mad to think it'." Powell pointed out that the UK's nuclear weaponry "is negligible in comparison with that of Russia: if we could destroy 16 Russian cities she could destroy practically every vestige of life on these islands several times over. For us to use the weapon would, therefore, be equivalent to more than suicide: it would be genocide—the extinction of our race—in the literal and precise meaning of that much abused expression. Would anybody in their senses contemplate that this ought to be our choice or would be our choice?"

Powell further stated that the continental nations held the nuclear weapon in such esteem that they had conventional forces "manifestly inadequate to impose more than brief delay upon an assault from the East. The theory of nuclear deterrence states that, should Warsaw Pact forces score substantial military successes or make substantial advances this side of the Iron Curtain, the United States would initiate the suicidal duel of strategic nuclear exchanges with the Soviet Union. One can only greet this idea with an even more emphatic 'One must be mad to think of it'. That a nation staring ultimate military defeat in the face would choose self-extermination is unbelievable enough; but that the United States, separated from Europe by the Atlantic Ocean, would regard the loss of the first pawn in the long game as necessitating harakiri is not describable by the ordinary resources of language". The reason why governments, including in the US, supported nuclear weapons was that "enormous economic and financial interests are vested in the continuation and elaboration of nuclear armaments. I believe, however, that the crucial explanation lies in another direction: the nuclear hypothesis provides governments with an excuse for not doing what they have no intention of doing anyhow, but for reasons which they find it inconvenient to specify".

On 2 June, Powell spoke against the stationing of American cruise missiles in Britain and asserted that the US had an obsessive sense of mission and a hallucinatory view of international relations: "The American nation, as we have watched their proceedings during these last 25 years, will not, when another Atlantic crisis, another Middle East crisis or another European crisis comes, wait upon the deliberations of the British Cabinet, whose point of view and appreciation of the situation will be so different from their own".

In 1983, his local agent was Jeffrey Donaldson, later an Ulster Unionist MP before defecting to the DUP.

=== 1983–1987 ===
In 1984, Powell alleged that the American Central Intelligence Agency (CIA) had murdered Lord Mountbatten and that the assassinations of the MPs Airey Neave and Robert Bradford were carried out at the direction of elements of the US federal government with the strategic objective of preventing Neave's policy of integration of Northern Ireland fully into the United Kingdom. In 1986, Powell stated that the Irish National Liberation Army had not killed Neave but that "MI6 and their friends" were responsible: Powell cited as his sources information that had been disclosed to him from within the Royal Ulster Constabulary.

In 1985, race riots between the black community and the police broke out in London and in Birmingham, leading Powell to repeat his warning that ethnic civil conflict would be the ultimate outcome of mass immigration into the Great Britain and re-issue his call for a government-sponsored programme of repatriation.

Powell later came into conflict with Thatcher in November 1985 over her support for the Anglo-Irish Agreement. On the day it was signed, 14 November, Powell asked her in the Commons: "Does the Right Hon. Lady understand — if she does not yet understand she soon will — that the penalty for treachery is to fall into public contempt?", the prime minister replying that she found his remarks "deeply offensive".

Along with other Unionist MPs, Powell resigned his seat in protest and then narrowly regained it at the ensuing by-election.

In 1986, the former Irish schoolteacher Seamus Mallon was a new entrant to the Commons. During his maiden speech Mallon quoted the Dutch philosopher Baruch Spinoza, saying, "Peace is not an absence of war. It is … a state of mind, a disposition for benevolence, confidence, justice." Powell, sitting close to Mallon, hissed an objection. When Mallon enquired why, Powell said that he had misquoted Spinoza. Mallon stated he had not and, to reconcile the standoff between them, they both proceeded to the library to verify the quote. Mallon was found to have been correct.

In 1987, Thatcher visited the Soviet Union, which signified to Powell a "radical transformation which is in progress in both the foreign policy and the defence policy of the United Kingdom". In a speech in the Commons on 7 April Powell said the nuclear hypothesis had been shaken by two events. The first was the Strategic Defense Initiative or "Star Wars": "Star wars raised the terrible prospect that there might be an effective means of neutralising the inter-continental ballistic missile, whereby the two great giants who held what had become to be seen as the balance of terror would contract out of the game altogether: the deterrent would be switched off by the invulnerability of the two providers of the mutual terror".

America's "European allies were brought along to acquiesce in the United States engaging in the rational activity of discovering whether there was after all some defence against nuclear attack ... by the apparent assurance obtained from the United States that it was only engaged in experiment and research, and that, if there were any danger of effective protection being devised, of course the United States would not avail itself of that protection without the agreement of its European allies. That was the first recent event which shook to its foundations the nuclear deterrent with which we had lived these last 30 years".

The second event was Mikhail Gorbachev's offer of both the Soviet Union and the United States agreeing to abolish intermediate-range ballistic missiles. Powell said that Thatcher's "most significant point was when she went on to say that we must aim at a conventional forces balance. So, after all our journeys of the last 30 or 40 years, the disappearance of the intermediate range ballistic missile revived the old question of the supposed conventional imbalance between the Russian alliance and the North Atlantic Alliance".

Powell further said that even if nuclear weapons had not existed, the Russians would still not have invaded Western Europe: "What has prevented that from happening was ... the fact that the Soviet Union knew ... that such an action on its part would have led to a third world war—a long war, bitterly fought, a war which in the end the Soviet Union would have been likely to lose on the same basis and in the same way as the corresponding war was lost by Napoleon, by the Emperor Wilhelm and by Adolf Hitler. It was that fear, that caution, that understanding, that perception on the part of Russia and its leaders that was the real deterrent against Russia committing the utterly irrational and suicidal act of plunging into a third world war in which the Soviet Union would be likely to find itself confronting a combination of the greatest industrial and economic powers in the world".

Powell said, "In the minds of the Russians the inevitable commitment of the United States in such a war would have come not directly or necessarily from the stationing of American marines in Germany, but, as it came in the previous two struggles, from the ultimate involvement of the United States in any war determining the future of Europe". Thatcher's belief in the nuclear hypothesis "in the context of the use of American bases in Britain to launch an aggressive attack on Libya, that it was 'inconceivable' that we could have refused a demand placed upon this country by the United States. The Prime Minister supplied the reason why: she said it was because we depend for our liberty and freedom upon the United States. Once let the nuclear hypothesis be questioned or destroyed, once allow it to break down, and from that moment the American imperative in this country's policies disappears with it".

At the start of the 1987 general election, Powell claimed the Conservatives' prospects did not look good: "I have the feeling of 1945". During the final weekend of the election campaign Powell gave a speech in London reiterating his opposition to the nuclear hypothesis, calling it "barmy", and advocating a vote for the Labour Party, which had unilateral nuclear disarmament as a policy. He claimed that Chernobyl had strengthened "a growing impulse to escape from the nightmare of peace being dependent upon the contemplation of horrific and mutual carnage. Events have now so developed that this aspiration can at last be rationally, logically and—I dare to add—patriotically seized by the people of the United Kingdom if they will use their votes to do so".

However, Powell lost his seat in the election by 731 votes to the SDLP's Eddie McGrady, mainly because of demographic and boundary changes that resulted in there being many more Irish Nationalists in the constituency than before. The boundary changes had arisen due to his own campaign for the number of MPs representing Northern Ireland to be increased to the equivalent proportion for the rest of the United Kingdom, as part of the steps towards greater integration. McGrady paid tribute to Powell, recognising the respect he was held in by both Unionists and Nationalists in the constituency. Powell said, "For the rest of my life when I look back on the 13 years I shall be filled with affection for the Province and its people, and their fortunes will never be out of my heart". He received a warm ovation from the mostly Nationalist audience and as he walked off the platform, he said the words Edmund Burke used on the death of the candidate Richard Coombe: "What shadows we are, what shadows we pursue". When a BBC reporter asked Powell to explain his defeat, he replied: "My opponent polled more votes than me".

He was offered a life peerage, which was regarded as his right as a former Cabinet minister, but he declined it. He argued that as he had opposed the Life Peerages Act 1958, it would be hypocritical for him to take one.

== Post-parliamentary life ==
=== 1987–1992 ===
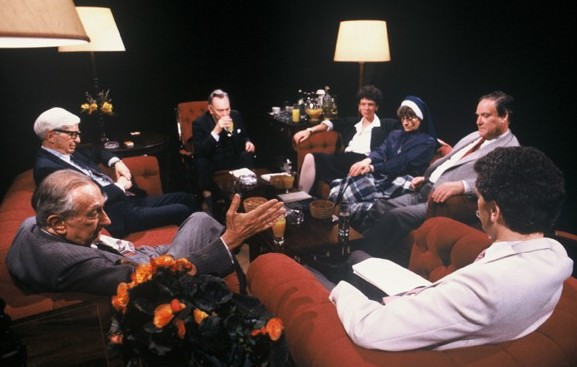
Powell debating on the television discussion programme After Dark in 1987 (more here)

Powell was critical of the Special Air Service (SAS) shootings of three unarmed IRA members in Gibraltar in March 1988. Powell claimed in an article for The Guardian on 7 December 1988 that the new Western-friendly foreign policy of Russia under Mikhail Gorbachev heralded "the death and burial of the American empire". Chancellor Helmut Kohl of West Germany had decided to visit Moscow to negotiate German reunification, signalling to Powell that the last gasp of American power in Europe to be replaced by a new balance of power not resting on military force but on the "recognition of the restraints which the ultimate certainty of failure places upon the ambitions of the respective national states".

In an interview for the Sunday People in December 1988, Powell said the Conservative Party was "rejoining Enoch" on the European Community but repeated his warning of civil war as the consequence of immigration: "I still cannot forsee how a country can be peaceably governed in which the composition of the population is progressively going to change. I am talking about violence on a scale which can only be described as civil war. I cannot see there can be any other outcome". It would not be a race war but "about people who revolt against being trapped in a situation where they feel at the mercy of a built-in racial majority, whatever its colour" and claimed that the government had made contingency plans for such an event. The solution, he said, was repatriation on a large scale and the cost of doing this in welfare payments and pensions was well worth paying.

In early 1989, he made a programme (broadcast in July) on his visit to Russia and his impressions on that country. The BBC originally wanted him to do a programme on India, but the Indian High Commission in London refused him a visa. When he visited Russia, Powell went to the graves of 600,000 people who died during the Siege of Leningrad, saying that he could not believe a people who had suffered so much would willingly start another war. He also went to a veterans' parade (wearing his own medals) and talked with Russian soldiers with the aid of an interpreter. However, the programme was criticised by those who believed that Powell had dismissed the Soviet Union's threat to the West since 1945 and that he had been too impressed with Russia's sense of national identity. When German reunification was on the agenda in mid-1989, Powell said that Britain urgently needed to create an alliance with the Soviet Union in view of Germany's effect on the balance of power in Europe.

Following Thatcher's Bruges speech in September 1988 and her increasing hostility to a European currency in the last years of her premiership, Powell made many speeches publicly supporting her attitude to Europe. When Heath criticised Thatcher's speech in May 1989, Powell called him "the old virtuoso of the U-turn". When inflation crept up that year, he condemned Chancellor of the Exchequer Nigel Lawson's policy of printing money so sterling would shadow the Deutsche Mark and said that it was for Britain to join the European Monetary System (EMS).

In early September 1989, a collection of Powell's speeches on Europe was published, titled Enoch Powell on 1992 (1992 being the year set for the creation of the Single Market by the Single European Act of 1986). In a speech at Chatham House for the launch of the book on 6 September, he advised Thatcher to fight the next general election on a nationalist theme as many Eastern European nations previously under Russian rule were gaining their freedom. At the Conservative Party Conference in October, he told a fringe meeting, "I find myself today less on the fringe of that party than I have done for 20 years". After Thatcher resisted further European integration at a meeting at Strasbourg in November, Powell asked her parliamentary private secretary, Mark Lennox-Boyd, to pass to her "my respectful congratulations on her stand ... she both spoke for Britain and gave a lead to Europe—in the line of succession of Winston Churchill and William Pitt. Those who lead are always out in front, alone". Thatcher replied, "I am deeply touched by your words. They give me the greatest possible encouragement".

On 5 January 1990, addressing Conservatives in Liverpool, Powell said that if the Conservatives played the "British card" at the next general election, they could win; the new mood in Britain for "self-determination" had given the newly independent nations of Eastern Europe a "beacon", adding that Britain should stand alone, if necessary, for European freedom, adding: "We are taunted—by the French, by the Italians, by the Spaniards—for refusing to worship at the shrine of a common government superimposed upon them all ... where were the European unity merchants in 1940? I will tell you. They were either writhing under a hideous oppression or they were aiding and abetting that oppression. Lucky for Europe that Britain was alone in 1940". "The Conservative Party would have to ask, preferably at the next election: 'Do you intend still to control the laws which you obey, the taxes you pay and the policies of your government?'"

Five days after this speech, in an interview for The Daily Telegraph, Thatcher praised Powell: "I have always read Enoch Powell's speeches and articles very carefully. ... I always think it was a tragedy that he left. He is a very, very able politician. I say that, even though he has sometimes said vitriolic things against me". On the day of the Mid-Staffordshire by-election, Powell said that the government should admit that the community charge was "a disaster" and that what mattered most to the people of Mid-Staffordshire was the question of who should govern Britain and that only the Conservative Party was advocating that the British should govern themselves. Thatcher had been labelled "dictatorial" for wanting to "go it alone" in Europe: "Well, I do not mind somebody being dictatorial in defending my own rights and those of my fellow countrymen... lose self-government, and I have lost everything, and for good". This was the first election since 1970 in which Powell was advocating a vote for the Conservative Party.

After Iraq invaded Kuwait on 2 August 1990, Powell said that since Britain was not an ally of Kuwait in the "formal sense" and because the balance of power in the Middle East had ceased to be a British concern after the end of the British Empire, Britain should not go to war. Powell said that "Saddam Hussein has a long way to go yet before his troops come storming up the beaches of Kent or Sussex". On 21 October he wrote, "The world is full of evil men engaged in doing evil things. That does not make us policemen to round them up nor judges to find them guilty and to sentence them. What is so special about the ruler of Iraq that we suddenly discover that we are to be his jailers and his judges? ... we as a nation have no interest in the existence or non-existence of Kuwait or, for that matter, Saudi Arabia as an independent state. I sometimes wonder if, when we shed our power, we omitted to shed our arrogance".

When Thatcher was challenged by Michael Heseltine for the leadership of the Conservative Party during November 1990, Powell said he would rejoin the party, which he had left in February 1974 over the issue of Europe, if Thatcher won, and would urge the public to support both her and, in Powell's view, national independence. He wrote to Thatcher's supporter Norman Tebbit on 16 November, telling him Thatcher was entitled to use his name and his support in any way she saw fit. Since she resigned on 22 November, Powell never rejoined the Conservatives. Powell wrote the following Sunday: "Good news is seldom so good, nor bad news so bad, as at first sight it appears. Her downfall was due to having so few like-minded people on European integration amongst her colleagues, and as she had adopted a line that would improve her party's popularity, it was foolish of them to force her out." He added, "The battle has been lost, but not the war. The fact abides that, outside the magic circle at the top, a deep-rooted opposition has been disclosed in the UK to surrendering to others the right to make our laws, fix our taxes, or decide our policies. Running deep beneath the overlay of years of indifference is still the attachment of the British public to their tradition of democracy. Their resentment on learning that their own decisions can be overruled from outside remains as obstinate as ever". Thatcher had relit the flame of independence and "what has happened once can happen again ... sooner or later those who aspire to govern ... will have to listen".

In December 1991, Powell said that "Whether Yugoslavia dissolves into two states or half a dozen states or does not dissolve at all makes no difference to the safety and well being of the United Kingdom". The UK's national interests determined that the country should have "a foreign policy which befits the sole insular and oceanic state in Europe". During the 1992 general election Powell spoke for Nicholas Budgen in his old seat of Wolverhampton South West. He praised Budgen for his opposition to the Maastricht Treaty and condemned the rest of the Conservative Party for supporting it.

== Final years ==
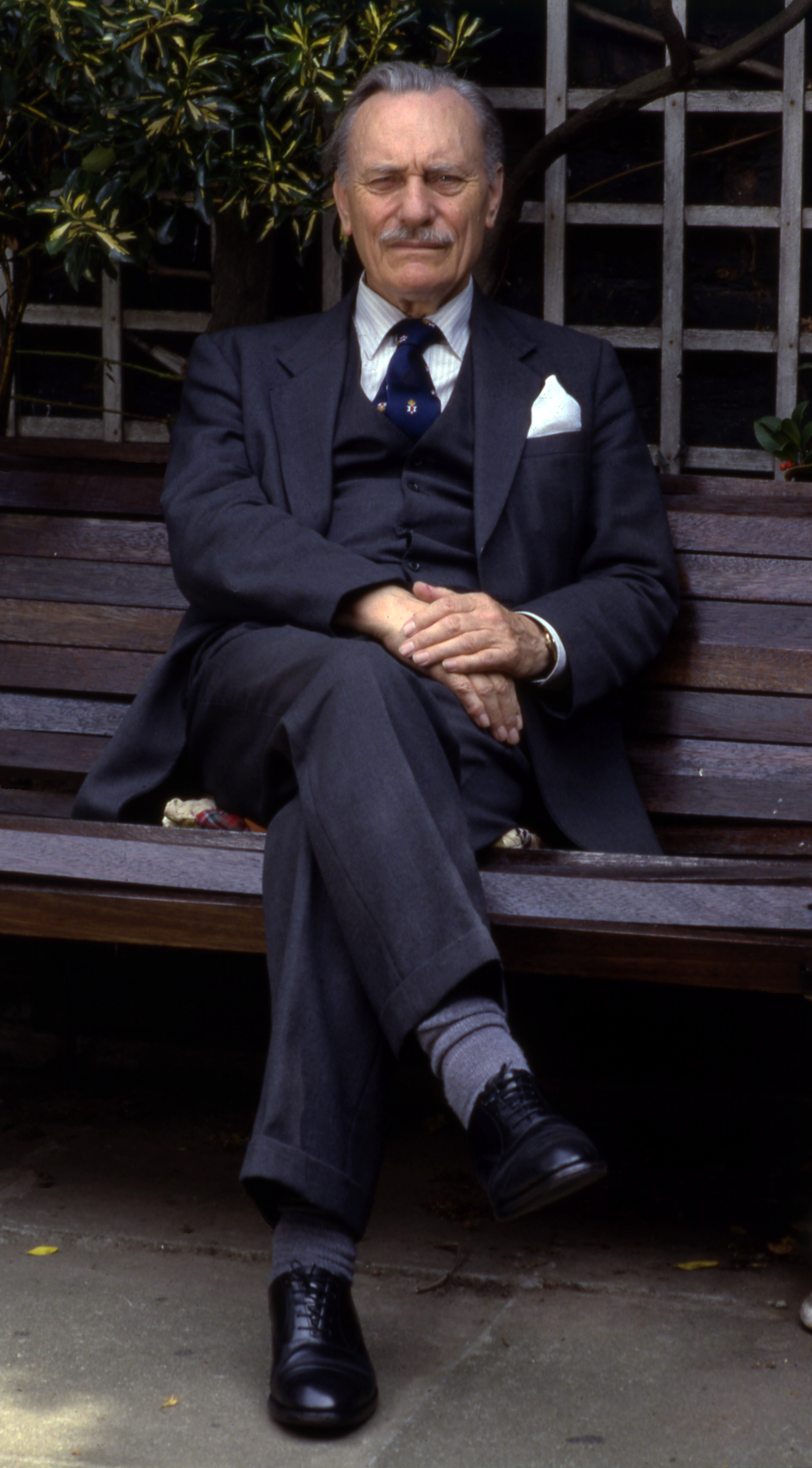
Portrait of Enoch Powell by Allan Warren in 1987

In late 1992, aged 80, Powell was diagnosed with Parkinson's disease. In 1994, he published The Evolution of the Gospel: A New Translation of the First Gospel with Commentary and Introductory Essay. On 5 November the European printed an article by Powell in which he said he did not expect the European Communities Act 1972 to be amended or repealed but added, "Still, something has happened. There has been an explosion. Politicians, political parties, the public itself have looked into the abyss... the British people, somehow or other, will not be parted from their right to govern themselves in parliament".

In 1993, the 25-year anniversary of Powell's "Rivers of Blood" speech, Powell wrote an article for The Times in which he claimed the concentration of immigrant communities in inner cities would lead to "communalism", which would have grave effects on the electoral system: "communalism and democracy, as the experience of India demonstrates, are incompatible". In May he spoke for Alan Sked of the Anti-Federalist League (the forerunner of the UK Independence Party) who was standing at the Newbury by-election. Sked went on to lose his deposit at the by-election, polling only 601 votes (1.0 per cent). At Michael Portillo's 40th birthday party the same month, Thatcher greeted him enthusiastically and asked him: "Enoch, I haven't seen you since your eightieth-birthday dinner. How are you?" Powell replied, "I'm eighty-one". Powell's opinion of Thatcher had declined after she endorsed John Major at the 1992 general election, which he believed to be a repudiation of her fight against European integration following the Bruges speech.

In 1994, Nigel Farage asked Enoch Powell to endorse his UK Independence Party (UKIP) and to stand for them, both of which Powell declined.

On 16 May 1994, Powell spoke at the Bruges Group and said Europe had "destroyed one Prime Minister and will destroy another Prime Minister yet" and demanded that powers surrendered to the European Court of Justice to be repatriated. In June 1994 he wrote an article for the Daily Mail in which he stated that "Britain is waking from the nightmare of being part of the continental bloc, to rediscover that these offshore islands belong to the outside world and lie open to its oceans". Innovations in contemporary society did not worry him: "When exploration has run its course, we shall revert to the normal type of living to which nature and instinct predispose us. The decline will not have been permanent. The deterioration will not have been irreversible".

In his book The Evolution of the Gospel, published in August 1994, Powell said he had arrived at the view that Jesus was not crucified but stoned to death by the Jews. Bishop John Austin Baker commented "He is a great classicist, but theology is out of his academic field."

Following Powell's death his friend Richard Ritchie recorded in 1998 that, "during one of the habitual coal crises of recent years he told me that he had no objection to supporting the coal industry, either through the restriction of cheap coal imports or subsidy, if it were the country's wish to preserve local coal communities".

In the 1990s, Powell endorsed three UKIP candidates in parliamentary elections. He also turned down two invitations to stand for the party in elections, citing retirement.

In April 1995, he said in an interview that for the Conservatives "defeat [at the next election] would help. It helps one to change one's tune". The party was just "slithering around". The same month, he took part at a debate on Europe at the Cambridge Union and won.

In July 1995, there was a leadership election for the Conservative Party, in which Major resigned as leader of the party and stood in the election. Powell wrote, "He says to the Sovereign: I no longer am leader of the majority party in the House of Commons; but I am carrying on as your Prime Minister. Now I don't think anybody can say that—at least without inflicting damage on the constitution". To seek to offer advice to the Queen while unable to feel they could command a majority in the Commons was "tantamount to treating the monarch herself with disrespect and denying the very principle in which our parliamentary democracy is founded". After Major's challenger, John Redwood, was defeated, Powell wrote to him, "Dear Redwood, you will never regret the events of the last week or two. Patience will evidently have to be exercised—and patience is the greatest of the political virtues—by those of us who want to keep Britain independent and self-governed".

During the final years of his life, he managed occasional pieces of journalism and co-operated in a BBC documentary about his life in 1995 (Odd Man Out was broadcast on 11 November). In April 1996 he wrote an article for the Daily Express in which he said: "Those who consented to the surrender made in 1972 will have to think again. Thinking again means that activity most unthinkable for politicians—unsaying what has been said. The surrender... we have made is not irrevocable. Parliament still has the power (thank God) to reclaim what has been surrendered by treaty. It is time we told the other European nations what we mean by being self-governed". In October, he gave his last interview, to Matthew d'Ancona in the Sunday Telegraph.

He said: "I have lived into an age in which my ideas are now part of common intuition, part of a common fashion. It has been a great experience, having given up so much to find that there is now this range of opinion in all classes, that an agreement with the EEC is totally incompatible with normal parliamentary government. …The nation has returned to haunt us". When Labour won the 1997 general election, Powell told his wife, Pamela Wilson, "They have voted to break up the United Kingdom." She rejoined the Conservative Party the next day, but he did not. By then, Powell had been hospitalised several times as a result of multiple falls.

== Death ==
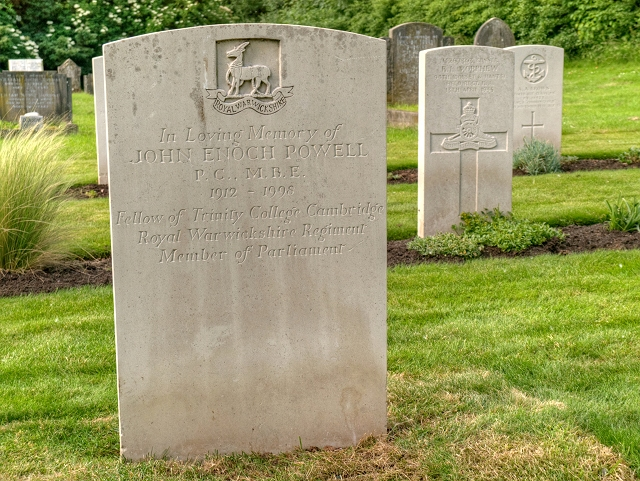
Powell's grave at Warwick Cemetery in Warwick, Warwickshire

A few hours following Powell's final admission to King Edward VII's Hospital in London, he asked where his lunch was. On being told that he was being fed intravenously, he remarked, "I don't call that much of a lunch." These were his last recorded words. He died there on 8 February 1998 at the age of 85. He was survived by his widow and two daughters. His study of the Gospel of John remained unfinished.

Dressed in his brigadier's uniform, Powell's body was buried in his regiment's plot in Warwick Cemetery, Warwickshire, ten days after a family funeral service at Westminster Abbey and public services at St Margaret's, Westminster, and the Collegiate Church of St Mary, Warwick.

Following Powell's death many politicians, including his rivals, paid tribute to him. Prime Minister Tony Blair said, "However controversial his views, he was one of the great figures of 20th-century British politics, gifted with a brilliant mind. However much we disagreed with many of his views, there was no doubting the strength of his convictions or their sincerity, or his tenacity in pursuing them, regardless of his own political self-interest." Thatcher said, "There will never be anybody else so compelling as Enoch Powell. He was magnetic. Listening to his speeches was an unforgettable privilege. He was one of those rare people who made a difference and whose moral compass led us in the right direction." Over 1,000 people attended Powell's funeral. During the ceremony he was hailed as a man of prophecy, political sacrifice and as a great parliamentarian. During the service Lord Biffen said that Powell's nationalism "certainly did not bear the stamp of racial superiority or xenophobia". Other mourners at the service included the socialist Labour MP Tony Benn, who, despite criticising the Rivers of Blood speech, maintained a close relationship with Powell. Asked why he had attended the funeral, Benn responded: "he was my friend."

== Personal life ==
Powell spoke German, French, Italian, Modern Greek, and Hindi/Urdu, and had a reading knowledge of Spanish, Portuguese, Russian, and Welsh. Among classical languages, he knew Ancient Greek, Latin, Hebrew, and Aramaic.

Canon Eric James, a former Trinity College chaplain, said in a letter to The Times on 10 February 1998 that in his old age Powell said to him that he had been in love with a fellow male undergraduate at Cambridge (whom Michael Bloch believes was "probably Edward Curtis of Clare College") and that this infatuation had inspired love verses published in his First Poems. Following his appointment as Professor of Greek at the University of Sydney in 1937, he wrote to his parents that he was repelled by his female students, while feeling "an instant and instinctive affection" for young Australian males. This, he added, might be "deplored, but it cannot be altered", and it therefore had to be "endured – and (alas!) camouflaged." The letters are now in the Churchill College Archives.

Powell became an atheist while in sixth form through his study of German philosophy, particularly the works of Friedrich Nietzsche. Despite this, he later became a devout member of the Church of England. He subsequently became a church warden of St. Margaret's, Westminster.

Powell in his garden in Belgravia, London, in 1986

On 2 January 1952 the 39-year-old Powell married 26-year-old Margaret Pamela Wilson, a former colleague from the Conservative Central Office. Their first daughter, Susan, was born in January 1954 and their second daughter, Jennifer, in October 1956. In Robert Shepherd's biography of Powell, it is noted that General Walter Cawthorn "became almost a second father" to him.

Powell was an anti-Stratfordian who firmly believed that William Shakespeare of Stratford-upon-Avon was not the writer of the plays and poems of Shakespeare. He appeared on an episode of Frontline, "The Shakespeare Mystery," 19 April 1989, in which he said, "My astonishment was to discover that these were the works of someone who'd 'been in the kitchen.' They are written by someone who has lived the life, who has been part of a life of politics and power, who knows what people feel when they are near to the centre of power. Near to the heat of the kitchen." He called the traditional biography a "Stratfordian fantasy."

In his younger years, Powell published four collections of poems: First Poems; Casting Off; Dancer's End; and The Wedding Gift. His Collected Poems appeared in 1990. As a young scholar he translated Herodotus's Histories and published many other works of classical scholarship. He also wrote a biography of Joseph Chamberlain in 1977. His political publications were often as critical of the Conservatives as they were of Labour, making fun of what he saw as logical fallacies in reasoning or action. His book Freedom & Reality contained many quotations from Labour party manifestos or by Harold Wilson that he regarded as nonsensical.

In March 2015 The Independent reported that Powell was one of the MPs whose activities had been investigated as part of Operation Fernbridge. His name had been passed to police by Paul Butler, the Bishop of Durham, after allegations of Powell's involvement in historic sexual abuse of children in the Elm Guest House had been made by one individual in the 1980s to the then Bishop of Monmouth, Dominic Walker. The allegations referred purely to alleged membership of "satanic cults", the Church said. According to the police, no prominent person had ever been conclusively identified as having abused a child there. (Note: Simon Heffer, who has published a biography of Powell, has described the allegation as a "monstrous lie" and criticised the Church of England's actions in "putting this smear into the public domain", while the church stated that it had simply responded to an inquiry from the press and confirmed that allegations about Powell, which related to an alleged satanic cult rather than any criminal activity, had been passed to the police.) (Note: David Aaronovitch of The Times wrote in April 2015 that the 1980s claims about Powell originated from fabricated claims invented by a conman, Derry Mainwaring Knight, whose false assertions had become known to the clergy, but had been unwittingly conveyed to the police in good faith.) He was also alleged to have committed sexual abuse on boys at hotels on the north coast of Northern Ireland while an MP there.

== Political beliefs ==
Powell delivered his Rivers of Blood speech on 20 April 1968. A poll which was taken after the speech reported that 74 per cent of Britons agreed with Powell's opinions on mass immigration. In The Trial of Enoch Powell, a Channel 4 television programme broadcast in April 1998, on the thirtieth anniversary of his Rivers of Blood speech (and two months after his death), 64 per cent of the studio audience voted that Powell was not a racist. Some in the Church of England, of which Powell was a member, took a different view. Upon Powell's death, black Barbados-born Wilfred Wood, then Bishop of Croydon, said "Enoch Powell gave a certificate of respectability to white racist views which otherwise decent people were ashamed to acknowledge".

Conservative commentator Bruce Anderson has claimed that the Rivers of Blood speech would have come as a complete surprise to anyone who had studied Powell's record: he had been a West Midlands MP for 18 years but had said hardly anything about immigration. On this view, the speech was merely part of a badly miscalculated strategy to become party leader if Heath fell. Anderson adds that the speech had no effect on immigration, except to make it more difficult for the subject to be discussed rationally in polite society.

Powell's opponents claimed he was far-right, fascist and racist. His supporters claim that the first two charges clash with his voting record on most social issues, such as homosexual law reform (he was in fact a co-sponsor of a bill on this issue in May 1965 and opposed the death penalty, both reforms unpopular among Conservatives at the time; however, he kept a low profile to his stance on these non-party "issues of conscience"). Powell voted against the reinstitution of the death penalty several times between 1969 and 1987.

By the early 1960s, Powell was in support of the campaign for immigration controls. The earliest and only statement from then by Powell on immigration was in August 1956, when, in Wolverhampton, Powell said that "a fundamental change in the law is necessary" in the UK's citizenship law. However, he explained that a change was not needed at that time but did not rule out the possibility of a future change. In the late 1950s, when other Conservatives were advocating a campaign for immigration control following race riots, Powell declined to join them, remarking that it was no good discussing the details when the "real issue" of the citizenship laws had remained unchanged. In November 1960, Powell became one of nine members of the ministerial committee which wanted to introduce controls of Commonwealth immigration; he submitted a letter in April 1961 which said "if we desire to limitations or conditions on the entry of coloured British subjects into this country" a change in the existing legal definition of a "British subject" was needed, since the British Nationality Act 1948 considered all those from independent Commonwealth countries listed under Britain's nationality law to be British subjects.

In February 1967 Powell wrote an article for the Daily Telegraph titled "Facing up to Britain's Race Problem" in which he wrote that, long before the immigrant population had reached 5% of the overall proportion of the United Kingdom, a "proportion would have filtered into the general population, mingled with it in occupation, residence, habits and intermarriage" compared to the other proportion which would be "more separated than now in habits, occupation and way of life".

Concerns raised about the effects of coloured immigration in communities in his constituency played a part in his commentary. In March 1968 the month before the "Rivers of Blood" speech, he made his first public references to them in a speech in Walsall, when he described the concern of an anonymous constituent whose daughter was the only white child in her primary school class and suffered bullying from non-white pupils. When Wolverhampton Express and Star journalists failed to find the child or the class, the paper's editor and a then personal friend, Clement Jones, challenged him, stating Jones himself had similar anonymous complaints that were traced to members of the National Front (NF). Powell would not accept the explanation and told Jones he had received "bags of supporting mail" as a result of the Walsall speech.

During an interview with the Birmingham Post, a fortnight after Powell's "Rivers of Blood" speech, he was asked whether or not he was a racialist. He replied:

What I would take racialist to mean is a person who believes in the inherent inferiority of one race of mankind to another, and who acts and speaks in that belief. So the answer to your question of whether I am a racialist is 'No' – unless perhaps, in reverse. I regard many of the peoples in India as being superior in many respects – intellectually, for example, and in other respects – to Europeans. Perhaps that is over-reacting.

Powell accepted an invitation to appear on David Frost's evening television programme on 3 January 1969. Frost asked Powell whether or not he was a racialist, to which Powell replied:

It depends on how you define the word "racialist". If you mean being conscious of the differences between men and nations, and from that, races, then we are all racialists. However, if you mean a man who despises a human being because he belongs to another race, or a man who believes that one race is inherently superior to another, then the answer is emphatically "No".

During the 1970 election, Tony Benn declared in a speech that Powell's approach to immigration was "evil": "The flag of racialism which has been hoisted in Wolverhampton is beginning to look like the one that fluttered over Dachau and Belsen." In response, when a television reporter told Powell at a meeting of Benn's comments, Powell snatched the microphone and replied: "All I will say is that for myself, in 1939 I voluntarily returned from Australia to this country, to serve as a private soldier against Germany and Nazism. I am the same man today." Similarly, Powell responded to student hecklers at a speech in Cardiff: "I hope those who shouted 'Fascist' and 'Nazi' are aware that before they were born I was fighting against Fascism and Nazism."

In November 1968 Powell also suggested that the problems that would be caused if there were a large influx of Germans or Russians into Britain "would be as serious – and in some respects more serious – than could follow from the introduction of a similar number of West Indies or Pakistanis".

Powell said his views were neither genetic nor eugenic and that he never arranged his fellow men on a merit according to their origins.

Powell said in a 1964 speech:

I have and always will set my face like flint against making any difference between one citizen of this country and another on grounds of his origins.

In a speech in November 1968, he said:

The West Indian or Asian does not, by being born in England, become an Englishman. In law he becomes a United Kingdom citizen by birth; in fact he is a West Indian or an Asian still.

In 1944, when Powell was visiting Poona with another member of the Joint Intelligence Committee, an Indian, Lieutenant-Colonel (later Field Marshal) K. M. Cariappa, he refused to stay at the Byculla Club once it became clear that Cariappa, as an Indian, would not be allowed to stay there. Close friends also recall that Powell took great pleasure in speaking Urdu when dining at Indian restaurants.

Nevertheless, Powell's nationalism and accusations of racialism sometimes trod a fine line. In 1996 the BBC journalist Michael Cockerell asked him about the language he used in the "Rivers of Blood" speech, arguing that it could be used by self-proclaimed racialists against non-whites. In defence of the language he used in the speech, Powell replied:

What's wrong with racism? Racism is the basis of a nationality. Nations are, upon the whole, united by identity with one another, the self-identification of our citizens, and that's normally due to similarities which are regarded as racial differences.

Powell further went on to say that "it's not impossible but it's difficult, for a non-white person to be British."

Victoria Honeyman, Lecturer in Politics at the University of Leeds in England, wrote of Powell's beliefs on immigration:

Enoch Powell was, like other politicians such as Keith Joseph, an intellectual in the true sense of the word. He would follow the logic of an intellectual argument to its conclusion, regardless of how unpalatable that conclusion was, and then present it and often expect others to appreciate his process. ... Powell is usually viewed as being a racist, but that is too simplistic. Powell was interested in what he saw as being best for Britain. ... While it is easy to label him a racist, if you view his argument as an intellectual argument, he simply delivered what he considered the reasoned conclusion to it. It was not a reflection on Indian and Pakistani people, only a comment on what immigration from these countries might do to Britain.

Powell's speeches and television interviews throughout his political life displayed a suspicion towards "the Establishment" in general, and by the 1980s there was a regular expectation that he would make some sort of speech or act in a way designed to upset the government and ensure he would not be offered a life peerage (and thus be transferred to the House of Lords). Some believe he had no intention of accepting a peerage as long as Heath sat in the Commons (which he did until after Powell's death). Powell had opposed the Life Peerages Act and felt it would be hypocritical to accept one himself since no prime minister had ever offered him a hereditary peerage.

== Legacy ==
Powell sat for the sculptor Alan Thornhill for a portrait in clay. The correspondence file relating to the Powell portrait bust is held as part of the Thornhill Papers (2006:56) in the archive of the Henry Moore Foundation's Henry Moore Institute in Leeds and the terracotta remains in the collection of the artist. The English photographer Allan Warren produced many portraits of Powell.

There are 24 images of Powell in the National Portrait Gallery Collection including work by Alexander Bassano's studios, Anne-Katrin Purkiss, and a 1971 cartoon by Gerald Scarfe.

Powell's "Rivers of Blood" speech was the subject of the play What Shadows by Chris Hannan, staged in Birmingham from 27 October to 12 November 2016, with Powell portrayed by the Scottish actor Ian McDiarmid and Clem Jones by George Costigan. Powell appears briefly as a character in James Graham's 2021 play Best of Enemies.

In August 2002 Powell appeared 55th in the list of 100 Greatest Britons of all time (voted for by the public in a BBC nationwide poll).

Keir Starmer's "Island of strangers" speech in 2025 received comparisons to Powell's "Rivers of Blood" speech. The Prime Minister's Office rejected comparisons to Powell and defended use of the phrase, saying that Starmer was "using his own words to rightly both recognise the contribution migrants have made over generations and to make the point that uncontrolled migration has been too high". Starmer later said that using the phrase was a mistake, saying it "wasn't right. I'll give you the honest truth: I deeply regret using it".

== Works ==
- Powell, Enoch; Rendel, Harris J. (1936). The Rendel Harris Papyri. Cambridge: The University Press. ASIN B000WGT4XG.
- Powell, Enoch (1937). First Poems. Shakespeare Head Press. ASIN B003U5HJCO.
- Powell, Enoch (1938). A Lexicon to Herodotus. Cambridge: The University Press. OCLC 6513741.
- Powell, Enoch (1939). The History of Herodotus. Coronet Books Inc. OCLC 948821318.
- Powell, Enoch (1939). Casting-off, and other poems. Basil Blackwell. ASIN B0050ID6GW.
- Powell, Enoch (1939). Herodotus, Book VIII. Pitt Press Series. ASIN B000XCU7HQ.
- Powell, Enoch; J, Stephen (1942). Cyfreithiau Hywel Dda Yn Ol Llyfr Blegywryd. Gwasg Prifsgol Cymru.
- Powell, Enoch; Jones, Henry Stuart, eds. (1963) [1942]. Thucydides Historiae Vol. I: Books I–IV 2/e. Clarendon Press. OCLC 871050.
- Powell, Enoch (1949). Herodotus. Oxford. ASIN B005INFMTI..
- Powell, Enoch; et al. (1950). One Nation. Conservative Political Centre. ASIN B001Y3CHZ8.
- Powell, Enoch (1951). Dancer's End and The Wedding Gift.
- Powell, Enoch; Macleod, Iain Norman (1952). The Social Services: needs and means. Conservative Political Centre. ASIN B0014M19BM.
- Powell, Enoch (1954). Change is our Ally. Conservative Political Centre. ASIN B0000CIVQA.
- Powell, Enoch; Maude, Angus (1970) [1955]. Biography of a Nation (second ed.). London: J. Baker. ISBN 0212983733.
- Powell, Enoch (1960). Great Parliamentary Occasions. The Queen Anne Press. ASIN B001P1VJEO.
- Powell, Enoch (1960). Saving in a Free Society. Institute of Economic Affairs by Hutchinson. ASIN B0000CKQQO.
- Powell, Enoch (1965). Wood, John (ed.). A Nation not Afraid. Hodder & Stroughton. ASIN B0000CMRLH.
- Powell, Enoch (1976) [1966]. Medicine and Politics: 1975 and After. Pitman Medical. ISBN 0272793779.
- Powell, Enoch; Wallis, Keith (1968). The House of Lords in the Middle Ages. ISBN 9780297761051.
- Powell, Enoch (1999) [1969]. Freedom and Reality. Kingswood. ISBN 0716005417.
- Powell, Enoch (March 1969), "A Housing Policy for Great Britain" (PDF), The Freeman, vol. 19, no. 3, pp. 171–175, archived (PDF) from the original on 10 September 2021 – via The Mises Institute
- Powell, Enoch (1971). Common Market: The Case Against. Elliot Right Way Books. ISBN 071600559X.
- Powell, Enoch (1972). Still to Decide. Elliot Right Way Books. ISBN 0716005662.
- Powell, Enoch (1973). The Common Market: Re-negotiate or Come Out. Elliot Right Way Books. ISBN 0716005859.
- Powell, Enoch (1973). No Easy Answers. Sheldon Press. ISBN 0859690016.
- Powell, Enoch (1977). Wrestling With the Angel. Sheldon Press. ISBN 0859691276.
- Powell, Enoch (1977). Joseph Chamberlain. Thames & Hudson Ltd. ISBN 0500011850.
- Powell, Enoch (1978). Ritchie, Richard (ed.). A Nation or No Nation?. London: Batsford. ISBN 0713415428.
- Powell, Enoch (1989). Ritchie, Richard (ed.). Enoch Powell on 1992. London: Anaya Publishers. ISBN 1854700081.
- Powell, Enoch (1991). Collings, Rex (ed.). Reflections of a Statesman: The Selected Writings and Speeches of Enoch Powell. London: Bellew Publishing Co Ltd. ISBN 0947792880.
- Powell, Enoch (1990). Collected Poems. Bellew Publishing Co Ltd. ISBN 0947792368.
- Powell, Enoch (1994). The Evolution of the Gospel. Yale University Press. ISBN 0300054211.

== Elections contested ==
UK Parliament elections

Date of election	Constituency	Party	Votes	%	Result
1947 Normanton by-election	Normanton	Conservative	4,258	17.9	Not elected
1950 United Kingdom general election	Wolverhampton South West	Conservative	20,239	46.0	Elected
1951 United Kingdom general election	Wolverhampton South West	Conservative	23,660	53.6	Elected
1955 United Kingdom general election	Wolverhampton South West	Conservative	25,318	60.0	Elected
1959 United Kingdom general election	Wolverhampton South West	Conservative	25,696	63.9	Elected
1964 United Kingdom general election	Wolverhampton South West	Conservative	21,736	57.4	Elected
1966 United Kingdom general election	Wolverhampton South West	Conservative	21,466	59.1	Elected
1970 United Kingdom general election	Wolverhampton South West	Conservative	26,220	64.3	Elected
October 1974 United Kingdom general election	South Down	Ulster Unionist	33,614	50.8	Elected
1979 United Kingdom general election	South Down	Ulster Unionist	32,254	50.0	Elected
1983 United Kingdom general election	South Down	Ulster Unionist	20,693	40.3	Elected
1986 Northern Ireland by-elections	South Down	Ulster Unionist	24,963	48.4	Elected
1987 United Kingdom general election	South Down	Ulster Unionist	25,848	45.7	Not elected

== Bibliography ==
- Bernstein, George L. (2004). The Myth Of Decline: The Rise of Britain Since 1945. Pimlico. ISBN 1844131025.
- Bloch, Michael (2015). Closet Queens. Little, Brown. ISBN 9781408704127.
- Collings, Rex, ed. (1991). Reflections of a Statesman: The Writings and Speeches of Enoch Powell. London: Bellew.
- Corthorn, Paul (2019). Enoch Powell: Politics and Ideas in Modern Britain. Oxford University Press. ISBN 9780198747147. OCLC 1083570370.
- Craig, F. W. S. (1983) [1969]. British parliamentary election results 1918–1949 (3rd ed.). Chichester: Parliamentary Research Services. ISBN 090017806X.
- Foot, Paul (1969). The Rise of Enoch Powell. Harmondsworth: Penguin.
- Heffer, Simon (1998). Like the Roman: The Life of Enoch Powell. London: Weidenfeld & Nicolson. ISBN 9780297842866.
- Howard, Greville (2014). Enoch at 100: A re-evaluation of the life, politics and philosophy of Enoch Powell. Biteback Publishing. ISBN 9781849547420.
- Lewis, Roy (1979). Enoch Powell: Principle in Politics. London: Cassell. ISBN 0304300721.
- Murray, Douglas (2017). The Strange Death of Europe: Immigration, Identity, Islam. London: Bloomsbury Continuum. ISBN 9781472942241.
- Ostow, Robin (1991). Ethnicity, structured inequality, and the state in Canada and the Federal Republic of Germany. Lang. ISBN 9783631437346.
- Roth, Andrew (1970). Enoch Powell: Tory Tribune. London: TBS The Book Service Ltd. ISBN 9780356031507.
- Shepherd, Robert (1994). Iain Macleod. London: Hutchinson. ISBN 9780091785673.
- Shepherd, Robert (1996). Enoch Powell. London: Hutchinson. ISBN 0091792088.
- Smithies, Bill; Fiddick, Peter (1969). Enoch Powell on immigration. London: Sphere. ISBN 9780722179468.
- Stacey, Tom (1970). Immigration and Enoch Powell. London: Tom Stacey Ltd. OCLC 151226.
- Stephens, Trent D.; Brynner, Rock (2001). Dark Remedy: The Impact of Thalidomide and Its Revival As a Vital Medicine. Cambridge, Massachusetts: Basic Books. ISBN 0738205907.

== See also ==
- Nigel Hastilow – English politician (born 1956)

Parliament of the United Kingdom
New constituency	Member of Parliament for Wolverhampton South West; 1950 – 1974	Succeeded by Nick Budgen
Preceded by Lawrence Orr	Member of Parliament for South Down; 1974–1987	Succeeded by Eddie McGrady
Political offices
Preceded by Henry Brooke	Financial Secretary to the Treasury; 1957–1958	Succeeded by Jack Simon
Preceded by Derek Walker-Smith	Minister of Health; 1960–1963	Succeeded by Anthony Barber
Preceded by Peter Thorneycroft	Shadow Secretary of State for Defence; 1965–1968	Succeeded by Reginald Maudling
