= Vitebsky =

Vitebsky may refer to:

- Vitebsky Rail Terminal, a terminus in Saint Petersburg, Russia
- Vitebsky Central Sport Complex, a sports venue in Vitebsk, Belarus

== People with the surname ==
- Piers Vitebsky, British anthropologist
