= Julia Whitty =

Author and filmmaker

- Born: Bogotá, Colombia
- Occupations: Filmmaker, environmental journalist, author
- Known for: Underwater and nature documentaries and books, environmental correspondence for Mother Jones
- Awards: John Burroughs Medal (2008) PEN USA Award; Kiriyama Prize (2008) O. Henry Award (1999)

Julia Whitty is an Australian-American documentary filmmaker, environmental journalist, author, and adventurer. Born in Bogotá, Colombia to a Tasmanian father and South Asian mother, her family immigrated to the United States in her early childhood. She is known for her extensive career in nature documentaries, her three award-winning books on the natural world, and her years as environmental correspondent for Mother Jones magazine.

Ursula K. LeGuin called her writing "wonderfully various, unpredictable, and subversive"

== Career ==
=== Filmmaking ===
Whitty spent over two decades writing, producing, photographing, and editing more than 70 nature documentaries, including two 26-part series. Specializing in underwater cinematography, her films have aired globally on major networks including PBS, The Discovery Channel., and National Geographic

=== Journalism and writing ===
Whitty transitioned into print media, writing both fiction and nonfiction, contributing articles, essays, and short stories to publications such as Harper's, The Paris Review, the New York Times, Grist, Zoetrope: All-Story, and others. For nearly a decade, she served as the Environmental Correspondent for Mother Jones magazine, where she specialized in long-form journalism, with over 1000 articles and blog posts, focusing on biodiversity loss, population issues, and the climate crisis.

== Awards and honors ==
- A Tortoise for the Queen of Tonga (2003):
  - O. Henry Award
  - National Magazine Awards finalist (1999)
  - PEN/Hemingway Award runnerup
- The Fragile Edge: Diving and Other Adventures in the South Pacific:
  - John Burroughs Medal
  - Kiriyama Prize
  - PEN USA Award, and others (2008)
  - Dayton Literary Peace Prize (2008)
- Deep Blue Home: An Intimate Ecology of Our Wild Ocean
  - Orion Book Award
  - Washington Post Best of Nonfiction Book 2010
- Awards for environmental reporting
  - John Bartlow Martin Award for Public Interest Magazine Journalism
  - ProjectCensored
  - Society of Environmental Journalists,
  - Rona Jaffe Foundation Writers' Award

== Bibliography ==
- A Tortoise for the Queen of Tonga: Short Stories (2002)
- The Fragile Edge: Diving and Other Adventures in the South Pacific (2007)
- Deep Blue Home: An Intimate Ecology of Our Wild Ocean (2010)
- The Thirteenth Tipping Point (2007)
- Undersea by Rachel Carson (2013) – collectible art printing with woodblocks and afterword by Julia Whitty
