= Pascal Khoo Thwe =

Burmese writer (born 1967)

- Born: 1967 (age 58–59); Pekon, Shan State, Burma
- Education: Gonville and Caius College, Cambridge
- Occupation: Writer
- Awards: Kiriyama Prize

Pascal Khoo Thwe (born 1967) is a Burmese author from the minority Padaung people, known for his autobiographic writings about growing up in Myanmar under military rule. His 2002 memoir, From the Land of Green Ghosts: A Burmese Odyssey, was awarded the Kiriyama Prize.

== Biography ==
Thwe was born in Pekon, Shan State, Burma (today called Myanmar).

By a chance encounter with John Casey, a Cambridge don, Thwe was rescued from the jungles of Burma, where he and other student refugees were fighting Burmese soldiers for independence. In 1991, he enrolled at Gonville and Caius College, Cambridge, where he received his BA in English literature in 1995. His 2002 autobiographical book, From the Land of Green Ghosts: A Burmese Odyssey, was published by Harper-Collins in 2002.
