= Conservative Philosophy Group =

UK conservative organization

The Conservative Philosophy Group (CPG) was formed in the UK in 1974 by Sir Hugh Fraser, a Conservative MP, to provide an intellectual basis for conservatism at a time when the Conservative Party had just lost two general elections and elected a new leader, Margaret Thatcher. It was founded with four board members: Fraser, Roger Scruton, John Casey, and Jonathan Aitken MP.

Other members included Alan Clark MP, Enoch Powell MP, Maurice Cowling, Edward Norman, Sir Alfred Sherman, Paul Johnson, T. E. Utley, Lord Black, Lord Bauer, Lord Blake, Lord Sieff, Lord Weinstock, Lord Thomas and Lord Quinton. The following addressed the group: F. A. Hayek, Milton Friedman, Michael Oakeshott, Elie Kedourie, and Harold Macmillan.

Thatcher attended the group on a number of occasions, and Aitken claims she said to him whilst attending a meeting, "We must have an ideology; the other side have got an ideology they can test their policies against. We must have one as well." The CPG disbanded during the John Major years.

The Group was restarted in 2013 by Professor Roger Scruton with the assistance of Rodney Leach and other academics in partnership with the organisers of the Conservative Renewal Conferences in Windsor, George Bathurst and Richard Hyslop. It meets in the home of Lord Flight and other locations in Westminster.
