= Andrew X. Pham =

Vietnamese-born American author

- Born: 1967
- Died: 30 April 2025
- Education: University of California, Los Angeles
- Occupations: Writer, Aerospace Engineer
- Writing career
- Genres: Memoirs, Novels, Essays

Andrew X. Pham (1967 – April 30, 2025) was a Vietnamese-born American author and the founder of Spoonwiz. Pham was also an independent writer, journalist, and engineer. He received his B.S. in aerospace engineering from the University of California, Los Angeles, in 1990, and worked as an aircraft engineer before becoming a freelance technical writer and journalist. From 1994 to 2000, he was a book reviewer, food writer, and restaurant critic for Metro Newspapers in Silicon Valley, California.

== Extended biography ==
Born in Phan Thiet in 1967, Pham was the son of Pham Thong, a teacher, and his mother was laundress. Pham had two sisters, Chi and Kay, and three younger brothers, Huy, Tien, and Hien.

During the Vietnam War, Thong worked for the South Vietnamese Army in its propaganda department. He was eventually captured by the Vietcong and sent to Minh Luong Prison re-education camp for several months. After Thong's release, the family decided to flee by boat to Malaysia. As the boat was falling apart at sea they were rescued by an Indonesian freighter, which brought them to Indonesia.

Pham's family spent 18 months in a refugee camp in Jakarta. The First Baptist Church of Shreveport, Louisiana flew the Pham family to Louisiana and sponsored them there. Nine months later, the Pham family relocated to San Jose, California. After finishing high school, Pham attended UCLA to study engineering.

During this period Chi, who had left home years earlier, returned as a transgender male with the name Minh. After several months, Minh committed suicide. His tragic death was the catalyst for Pham's journey to Vietnam and self-discovery. After Minh's death, Pham decided to take a trip to the Pacific Northwest and then to Vietnam. He chronicled this journey in his book, Catfish and Mandala: A Two-Wheeled Voyage Through the Landscape and Memory of Vietnam.

Pham died on April 30, 2025. His ashes were scattered at sea in Thailand.

== Works ==
=== Memoirs ===
- Pham, Andrew X. (1999-09-29). Catfish and Mandala: A Two-Wheeled Voyage Through the Landscape and Memory of Vietnam. Farrar, Straus and Giroux. ISBN 978-0-374-11974-4. (1999)
- Pham, Andrew X. (2008). The Eaves of Heaven: A Life in Three Wars. Harmony Books. ISBN 978-0-307-38120-0. (2008)
- Pham, Andrew X. (2012). A Culinary Odyssey: My Cookbook Diary of Travels, Flavors, and Memories of Southeast Asia. Cloudtiger Productions. ISBN 978-0-985-51421-1. (2012)

=== Novels ===
- Pham, Andrew X. (2024). Twilight Territory: A Novel. W.W. Norton. ISBN 978-1-324-06484-8. (2024)

=== Essays ===
- Pham, Andrew X. (2012). A Theory of Flight. Cloudtiger Productions. ASIN B007SH91AS. (2012)

=== Translations ===
- Trâm, Đặng Thùy (2008). Last Night I Dreamed of Peace: The Diary of Đặng Thùy Trâm. Crown. ISBN 978-0-307-34738-1. (2008)

== Awards ==
- 1999 Kiriyama Pacific Rim Book Prize for Catfish and Mandala (memoir)
- 2000 Whiting Award
- 2009 Guggenheim Fellowship
