= John Casey (academic) =

British academic and writer

John Casey (born 1939) is a British academic and a writer for The Daily Telegraph. He has been described as "mentor" to Roger Scruton and is a former lecturer in English at the University of Cambridge and a former lecturer and a Life Fellow of Gonville and Caius College, Cambridge. In 1975, along with Scruton, he founded the Conservative Philosophy Group. Though not a member of Peterhouse, he has been considered part of the Cambridge Right, which included scholars from Selwyn College, Gonville and Caius College and Christ's College as well. He was editor of The Cambridge Review between 1975 and 1979.

== Cambridge ==
John Casey was educated by the Irish Christian Brothers at St. Brendan's College, Bristol and subsequently at King's College, Cambridge, where he received a First in both parts of the English Tripos. He later returned as a lecturer in English at Gonville and Caius College. Richard Cockett described Casey as a mentor to a whole generation of young Conservatives at Cambridge.

== The Language of Criticism ==
The Language of Criticism was originally Casey's doctoral thesis. Casey argued that critical judgement is objective because critical arguments are rational. They are rational due to considerations which, though they are not necessarily judgements of value, "criteriologically" imply them. For example, if a poem is sentimental "criteriologically" this implies that it is immature. Christopher Ricks wrote of this book, "provided this gets clearing from the philosophers, we shall at last have a compact, cogent and humane justification of criticism as a rational process."

== Pagan Virtue ==
Casey identified "pagan virtues" as those included in the "assertive, proud ethical tradition" of classical Greece and Rome. Pagan virtues, in contrast to Christian ones, included self-regard, worldly values and success in life. Casey also identified physical courage as a pagan virtue, "the chief motives of which are patriotism and the love of honour". These elaborations of pagan virtue were designed to strengthen the moral tradition and challenge Kantian ideas that idolised Good Will.

== Journalism ==
Casey has been a regular contributor to The Spectator, the Sunday and Daily Telegraph, the Daily Mail and the Evening Standard. His special interest is foreign commentary, writing from Japan, Iraq, Iran, Syria and Burma. His articles have included interviews with liberation theologians in Latin America, Hezbollah in Lebanon and Grand Ayatollahs in Iran. He has often written explanatory articles sympathetic to Islam. A chance meeting with the Taliban in North West Pakistan led to their inviting Casey to be their guest in Afghanistan, with the implication that he might be introduced to Osama Bin Laden; but he did not take up the invitation.

During his editorship of The Cambridge Review Casey expressed his conservative philosophy on politics, religion and culture. In 1976 he protested against social engineering and the egalitarianism of contemporary education policy, claiming that the fulfilment of the ideal of equality of opportunity meant the destruction of the family. In 1977 he defended single-sex colleges and also resisted the government's right to change a university's educational policy on political grounds. Casey also expressed his conservative Catholic views by vigorously criticising the suppression of the Tridentine Mass and condemning the New Rite as liberal and imposed on the conservative faithful from above. Upon the death of Pope Paul VI in 1978, Casey opposed the suggestion that the Church should elect a Third World pope. After Norman St John-Stevas in 1979 claimed that "part" of Christ was embodied in Pope John Paul II, Casey attacked this by claiming that the Pope's power did not depend on human characteristics but upon his office. Casey also claimed that "There is no such thing as "moral authority" independent of a precise system of belief. The Pope can have authority only over those who recognise his authority and share his beliefs".

Writers he published for the first time in The Cambridge Review included Gavin Stamp, Roger Scruton, Charles Moore, Oliver Letwin and Adair Turner.

== The Salisbury Review Controversy ==
In 1977 Casey attacked the Race Relations Act 1976 for removing the requirement of "mischievous intent" in inciting racial hatred. He claimed that the requirement was a safeguard of freedom of speech and that the racial issue was a political issue with the "possibilities and limitations of rational discussion" much like "all other political issues". In 1978 Casey attacked the ideology of anti-racism as a liberal myth that was inspired by the liberal tradition, a tradition that had culminated in Robert Nozick's "minimal state" unconnected to language, community and history. He further claimed that the anti-racialist ideology did not reflect the real world as it ignored the power of nationalism. Casey gave the cases of Ireland, Israel and African decolonisation as contemporary examples of nationalism and argued that the countries of Europe became more nationalist with more democratisation. Above all, Casey attacked liberalism for its inadequate explanation of the citizen's loyalty to the state because it ignored patriotism and the "continuity of institutions, shared experience, language, custom and kinship" in favour of a "rootless individualism". An article by Casey in The Salisbury Review titled 'One Nation: The Politics of Race' discussed the repatriation of Commonwealth immigrants. In 2011 Leo Robson of The Observer noted that "Casey long ago renounced the kind of ideas communicated in his lecture 'One Nation: The Politics of Race'." Writing in The Spectator Casey disavowed the article, describing it as "crazy and inhumane".

== The rescue of Pascal Khoo Thwe ==
In February 1988 Casey met a student in Mandalay, Burma, because he had been told he loved James Joyce. Shortly after the student, Pascal Khoo-Thwe (a member of a remote hill tribe), was forced to flee into the jungle along with thousands of others involved in a failed uprising. He sought help from Casey who travelled to the Thai border with a bodyguard and managed to get Khoo-Thwe to England. Khoo-Thwe went on to gain a place at Cambridge University and later wrote an account of the story in his book From The Land of Green Ghosts. The book won the Kiriyama prize for non-fiction (2002) and the French translation won a prize for the best foreign non-fiction book published in France in 2009.

== After Lives: A guide to Heaven, Hell and Purgatory ==
The book reviewed theories of the after life from the ancient Egyptians, through Mesopotamians, ancient Greeks and Romans, Christians and Muslims to the twentieth century. Literary critic James Wood, described the book in his review as having "relaxed obsessiveness of the magnum opus" and Casey as writing "like a Pagan" presenting "the interesting spectacle of a man who has been getting steadily less conservative with age."

== Books ==
- The Language of Criticism (London: Methuen, 1966).
- (editor), Morality and Moral Reasoning (London: Methuen, 1971).
- Pagan Virtue: An Essay in Ethics (Oxford: Clarendon Press, 1991).
- After Lives: A Guide to Heaven, Hell and Purgatory (Oxford: Oxford University Press, 2010).
- The Language of Criticism (London: Routledge Revivals, 2011).

== Articles ==
- “Hegel's Aesthetics”, TLS, Jan 1976.
- “Oxford Marxists and Cambridge Critics (on Terry Eagleton)”, TLS, May 1977.
- 'Tradition and Authority' in Maurice Cowling (ed.), Conservative Essays (London: Cassell, 1978), pp. 82–100.
- T.S. Eliot: Language, Sincerity and the Self, British Academy Chatterton Lecture, 1979
- 'One Nation: The Politics of Race' in The Salisbury Review, Vol. 1 No. 1, October 1982, pp. 23–28.
- 'How Can We Have a Duty to the Dead?' in The Salisbury Review, Vol. 2 No. 3, April 1983, pp. 4–6, reprinted in Roger Scruton (ed.), Conservative Thoughts: Essays from The Salisbury Review (London: The Claridge Press, 1988), pp. 173–180.
- “What is wrong with the Times?”, The Spectator, March 1987.
- “A Burmese evening”, The Spectator, Sept 1988.
- “Gazza and other gods”, Evening Standard, August 1990.
- “Among the Believers (Nicaragua)”, Sunday Telegraph, April 1991.
- “Sanctimonious: It is – are you?”, The Independent, Nov 1991.
- “Enemies on the lake (Burma)” Independent Magazine, 1991.
- “Michael Oakeshott”, TLS, March 1991.
- “Look no further than the mouth”, The Spectator, Nov 1993.
- “Cuba – yes but”, Sunday Telegraph, 1993.
- “Why fear Islam?”, Daily Telegraph, July 1994.
- “The roots of Classics”, Sunday Times Culture, March 1994.
- “Warriors without remorse (Japan)”, Telegraph, 1995.
- “Legalise hard drugs”, Daily Mail, May 1995.
- “Canon to right of them”, TLS, Nov 1995.
- “Art in an age of fundamentalism”, TLS, June 1996.
- “John Casey enjoys a chat with Hezbollah”, The Spectator, May 1997.
- “Egypt after the Hatshepsut massacre”, Daily Telegraph, Jan 1998.
- “Memories of a Catholic boyhood”, Daily Telegraph, April 1998.
- “Cuba's real religion”, The Spectator, Jan 1998.
- “Gays in Havana August”, The Spectator, 1998.
- “The far pavilions (meeting with Taliban)”, The Spectator, April 2000.
