= Piers Vitebsky =

British anthropologist

Piers Vitebsky is an anthropologist who was Head of Anthropology and Russian Northern Studies and Assistant Director of Research at the Scott Polar Research Institute of the University of Cambridge in England.

== Education ==
Vitebsky studied his undergraduate degree in Classics with Modern and Medieval Languages at King's College, Cambridge, graduating in 1971. He then went on to take a diploma in Social Anthropology at Oxford University. In the late seventies he was an affiliated student at the Delhi School of Economics. Eventually he completed his PhD at the School of Oriental and African Studies in London in 1982.

== Career ==
Since the 1980s, Vitebsky has carried out long-term fieldwork among with the Evens of Siberia, and among shamans and shifting cultivators in tribal India and Sri Lanka. In the Russian Arctic, he was the first westerner since the Revolution to live long-term with an indigenous community. Only after working for several months at the Museum of Anthropology and Ethnography in Leningrad was he allowed to fly out to Yakutsk in 1988.

From 1986 to 2016, Vitebsky was Head of Anthropology and Russian Northern Studies at the Scott Polar Research Institute of the University of Cambridge. Until his retirement he was Assistant Director of Research at the institute. His other appointments include Professor II at the University of Tromsø in Norway, Honorary Academician of the Academy of Sciences of the Republic of Sakha (Yakutia), and Honorary Professor at the North-Eastern Federal University in the Russian Far East.

His current focus is on reindeer herders' perceptions of and responses to climate change.

=== Media work ===
Vitebsky's numerous documentary film collaborations include 'Arctic aviators' (National Geographic) and 'Flightpaths to the gods' (BBC2, on the Nazca lines in Peru), and 'Siberia: after the shaman' (Channel 4), which won first prize at the Film Festival of the European Foundation for the Environment and was screened at the Margaret Mead Film Festival in New York City.

=== Awards ===
Vitebsky has won the Gilchrist Expedition Award from the Royal Geographical Society. In 2006 he won the Kiriyama Prize for non-fiction. He was also runner up for the Victor Turner Prize for Ethnographic Writing in 2007 - awarded annually by Society for Humanistic Anthropology, American Anthropological Association.

== Bibliography ==
=== Books ===
- Dialogues with the dead: the discussion of mortality among the Sora of eastern India (Cambridge University Press 1993; reprinted Delhi: Foundation Books 1993);
- The shaman: voyages of the soul from the Arctic to the Amazon (London: Duncan Baird; Boston: Little Brown 1995; reprinted as 'Shamanism' by University of Oklahoma Press 2001; translated into 15 languages);
- Reindeer People: Living with Animals and Spirits in Siberia. HarperCollins. 2005. ISBN 0-00-713362-6.
- With Monosi Raika Jujunji do Yuyunji a Banuddin: Sora Jattin a Sanskruti. Sora Beran Batte, Aboi Tanub. (Indigenous Knowledge: A Handbook of Sora Culture.) Part I. In Sora. Visakhapatnam: Privately printed.
- Living without the dead: loss and redemption in a jungle cosmos (University of Chicago Press 2017), ISBN 9780226475622

=== Journal articles ===
- Vitebsky, P.G., 2008. Loving and forgetting: moments of inarticulacy in Tribal India. Journal of the Royal Anthropological Institute, v. 14, p. 243-261.
- Vitebsky, P.G., Rees, W.G., Stammler, F.M. and Danks, F.S., 2008. Vulverability of European reindeer husbandry to global change. Climatic Change:, v. 87, p. 199-217.
- Vitebsky, P.G., 2010. From materfamilias to dinner-lady: the administrative destruction of the reindeer herder's family life. Anthropology of East Europe Review, v. 28, p. 38-50.
- Vitebsky, P.G., 2010. Introducing the 'Natural dimension' into Arctic humanities research. Northern Notes, v. 34, p. 13-14.
- Vitebsky, P.G. and Anatoly, A., 2014. Nomadismes d’Asie centrale et septentrionale. Diogène, v. 246-247, p. 258-264.
- Vitebsky, P. and Alekseyev, A., 2015. Siberia. Annual Review of Anthropology, v. 44, p. 439-455. doi:10.1146/annurev-anthro-092412-155546
- Vitebsky, P. and Alekseyev, A., 2015. Casting Timeshadows: Pleasure and Sadness of Moving among Nomadic Reindeer Herders in north-east Siberia. Mobilities, v. 10, p. 518-530. doi:10.1080/17450101.2015.1062298
- Vitebsky, P. and Alekseyev, A., 2015. What is a reindeer? Indigenous perspectives from northeast Siberia. Polar Record, v. 51, p. 413-421. doi:10.1017/S0032247414000333
- Willerslev, R., Vitebsky, P. and Alekseyev, A., 2015. Sacrifice as the ideal hunt: a cosmological explanation for the origin of reindeer domestication. Journal of the Royal Anthropological Institute, v. 21, p. 1-23. doi:10.1111/1467-9655.12142
- Willerslev, R., Vitebsky, P. and Alekseyev, A., 2015. Defending the thesis on the ‘hunter's double bind’. Journal of the Royal Anthropological Institute, v. 21, p. 28-31. doi:10.1111/1467-9655.12146
- Vitebsky, Piers (January 2023). "Dialogues with the dead : an indigenous spiritual tradition speaks to the fragility of theological diversity". Scientific American. 328 (1): 36–45.

=== Book chapters ===
- Vitebsky, P.G., Habeck, J.O., Comaroff, J., Costopoulos, A. and Navarette, F., 2010. Ethnographic researches in the North and their contribution to global anthropology, in Oktyabrskaya, . (ed.) North and South: dialogue between cultures and civilizations, Novosibirsk: Institute of Archaeology and Ethnography. p. 63-66.
- Vitebsky, P.G., 2011. Repeated returns and special friends: from mythic encounter to shared history, in Howell, S. and Talle, A. (eds.) Returns to the field: multitemporal research and contemporary anthropology, Bloomington. p. 180-202.
- Vitebsky, P.G., 2011. Historical time and ethnographic present: an anthropologist's experience of comparing change and loss in the Siberian Arctic and the Indian jungle, in Ziker, J.P. and Stammler, F. (eds.) Histories from the North: environments, movements and narrative, Boise State University. p. 71-77.
- Vitebsky, P.G., 2012. Afterword, in Brightman, M., Grotti, V.E. and Ulturgasheva, O. (eds.) Animism in rainforest and tundra: personhood, animals, plants and things in contemporary Amazonia and Siberia, Berghahn. v. 2133, p. 202-219.
