= Kiriyama Prize =

Former international literary award for books about the Pacific Rim and South Asia

The Kiriyama Prize was an international literary award awarded to books about the Pacific Rim and South Asia. Its goal was to encourage greater understanding among the peoples and nations of the region. Established in 1996, the prize was last awarded in 2008.

Winners include Greg Mortenson, David Oliver Relin, Luis Alberto Urrea, Piers Vitebsky, Nadeem Aslam, Suketu Mehta, Shan Sa, Inga Clendinnen, Pascal Khoo Thwe, Rohinton Mistry, Patricia Grace, Peter Hessler, Michael David Kwan, Michael Ondaatje, Cheng Ch'ing-wen, Andrew X. Pham, Ruth Ozeki, Patrick Smith, and Alan Brown.

== Prize ==
The prize was worth $30,000, split evenly between a non-fiction and a fiction winner. It was awarded by Pacific Rim Voices, a nonprofit organization based in San Francisco, California. For its first three years, the prize was given only to one book, either fiction or non-fiction.

To be eligible, a book had to significantly concern some aspect of life or culture in one of the four Pacific Rim subregions: the North Pacific; Southeast Asia and the South Pacific; the Americas; and the Indian subcontinent. Books could be written in or translated into English from another language. Books were submitted by publishers by late October each year and were judged by separate panels of five judges, one for fiction and one for non-fiction. The decisions were made between November and February. Finalists were announced at the end of February, and the prize itself was given at the end of March.

Judges included Alan Cheuse, Lauro H. Flores, James D. Houston, Sally Ito, Gish Jen, Chalmers Johnson, Nicholas Jose, Maxine Hong Kingston, Ruthanne Lum McCunn, Lisa See, Linda Spalding, Robert Sullivan, Gail Tsukiyama, Kathleen Tyau, and Jade Snow Wong.

== Recipients ==
2008

- Lloyd Jones — Mister Pip (fiction)
- Julia Whitty — The Fragile Edge: Diving and Other Adventures in the South Pacific (nonfiction)

2007
The 2007 prize for fiction, awarded to Haruki Murakami, was declined by Murakami "for reasons of personal principle."

- Haruki Murakami — Blind Willow, Sleeping Woman (fiction)
- Greg Mortenson and David Oliver Relin — Three Cups of Tea (nonfiction)

2006

- Luís Alberto Urrea — The Hummingbird’s Daughter (fiction)
- Piers Vitebsky — Reindeer People: Living with Animals and Spirits in Siberia (nonfiction)

2005

- Nadeem Aslam — Maps for Lost Lovers (fiction)
- Suketu Mehta — Maximum City: Bombay Lost and Found (nonfiction)

2004

- Shan Sa — The Girl Who Played Go (fiction)
- Inga Clendinnen — Dancing with Strangers (nonfiction)

2002

- Rohinton Mistry — Family Matters (fiction)
- Pascal Khoo Thwe — From the Land of Green Ghosts (nonfiction)

2001

- Patricia Grace — Dogside Story (fiction)
- Peter Hessler — River Town: Two Years on the Yangtze (nonfiction)

2000

- Michael Ondaatje — Anil's Ghost (fiction)
- Michael David Kwan — Things That Must Not Be Forgotten: A Childhood in Wartime China (nonfiction)

1999

- Cheng Ch’ing-wen — Three-Legged Horse (fiction)
- Andrew X. Pham — Catfish and Mandala: A Two-Wheeled Journey through the Landscape and Memory of Vietnam (nonfiction)

1998

- Ruth L. Ozeki — My Year of Meats (fiction)*

1997

- Patrick Smith — Japan: A Reinterpretation (nonfiction)*

1996

- Alan Brown — Audrey Hepburn's Neck (fiction)*

(*) Note: Only one Kiriyama Prize, for fiction or nonfiction, was awarded in the first three years of the award: 1998, 1997, and 1996.

== See also ==
- List of literary awards
