= Michael David Kwan =

Michael David Kwan (1934–2001) was the author of Things That Must Not Be Forgotten, which won the Kiriyama Prize, as well as three other books.

He was also an accomplished translator of Chinese literature into English.
