= Li Chiao (writer) =

Taiwanese novelist (born 1934)

Li Chiao (Chinese: 李喬; born June 15, 1934), or Lee Chiao, is a Taiwanese novelist and cultural critic. Originally named Li Neng-chi (李能棋), he writes under the pen names Li Chiao (李喬) and I Chan Ti (壹闡堤). He is a writer of Hakka descent from Miaoli County, Taiwan.

== Writing career ==
In 1962, Li Chiao made his debut with the short story Uncle Amei (阿妹伯), and in 1963, his short story Bitter Water Pit (苦水坑) won the first prize in a competition held by The Rambler (自由談), a literary journal published in Taiwan from the 1950s to 80s. In 1980, he published Wintry Night, a series of novels spanning three generations of a family against the backdrop of Japanese rule history and wars in Taiwan. The trilogy comprises three major works: Wintry Night (寒夜), Arid Village (荒村), and The Solitary Light (孤燈). Apart from his writing, Li Chiao played a pivotal role in founding the Miaoli Hakka Cultural Radio Station, contributing significantly to the promotion of Hakka culture in Taiwan.

Li Chiao focuses mainly on fiction, as well as essays and prose. Li grew up in humble circumstances, with a father who was constantly participating in social movements and a mother who shouldered the financial and childcare responsibilities, and portrayed the mother as a vital and revered figure in his works.

== Reception ==
His university studies in Chinese literature and Western philosophy influenced his works with Buddhist philosophical ideas, and his writings often explore the vulnerability of life and individuals. He described his writing inclination as "mostly about the description of the life of the general public, a faint voice for the voiceless ordinary people." Therefore, his novels exhibit a steadfast realistic style, addressing themes of the pain and helplessness of life.

Li Chiao considers his most important work to be The Trilogy of Wintry Night, a historical novel series recounting Taiwan's development and historical events. Set against the backdrop of the Japanese rule period, the trilogy profoundly highlights the nation's suffering, the dignity of humanity, and the deep attachment people have to their land, embodying an epic, radiant portrayal of maternal love.
