= Sooni Taraporevala =

Indian film director

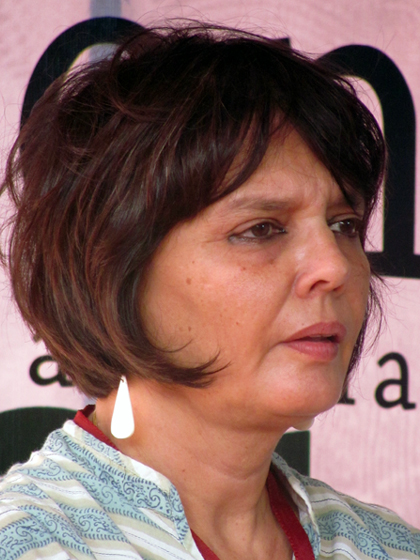
- Sooni Taraporevala in 2010
- Born: 1957 (age 68–69); Mumbai
- Occupations: screenwriter, film director, photographer
- Years active: 1988–present

Sooni Taraporevala (born 1957) is an Indian screenwriter, photographer, and filmmaker. She is known for the screenplays of Mississippi Masala, The Namesake (an adaptation of Jhumpa Lahiri's novel of the same name), and the Oscar-nominated Salaam Bombay!, all directed by Mira Nair. She also adapted Rohinton Mistry's novel Such A Long Journey (1998). She wrote the films Dr. Babasaheb Ambedkar, her directorial debut Little Zizou (2008), and Yeh Ballet (2020), a Netflix original film that she also directed.

Taraporevala wrote the screenplay for and directed her first feature film, Little Zizou (2008), an ensemble piece set in Mumbai. This film explores issues facing the Parsi community to which she belongs. It won the Silver Lotus Award (2009) at the National Film Awards for Best Film on Family Values.

Taraporevala was awarded the Padma Shri by Government of India in 2014. She is a member of the Academy of Motion Picture Arts and Sciences. Her photographs are in the permanent collections of the National Gallery of Modern Art (NGMA) in Delhi and the Metropolitan Museum of Art in New York.

== Early life and education ==
Taraporevala was born to a Parsi family in Mumbai in 1957. Her granduncle had been a studio photographer in Bombay, and her father Rumi had been an amateur photographer. She completed her schooling from Queen Mary School, Mumbai. Taraporevala got her first Instamatic camera at age 16.

She received a full scholarship to attend Harvard University as an undergraduate. (With a loan from a roommate, she bought a Nikkormat camera, but it was stolen when she returned to Bombay in the 1980s.) At Harvard she majored in English and American literature. She also took many film courses, including filmmaking taught by Alfred Guzzetti. Taraporevala met Mira Nair as an undergraduate, leading to their longtime creative collaboration after Nair started directing.

Taraporevala joined the Cinema Studies Department at New York University for further studies and received her MA in Film Theory and Criticism in 1981. She returned to India to work as a freelance still photographer. She shot her early work from this period on a Leica and her father's Nikon.

== Career ==
She returned to the US in 1988, settling in Los Angeles to work as a screenwriter. She wrote commissioned screenplays for a wide variety of studios, including Universal, HBO and Disney.

She moved back to India for good in 1992, and continued to work on screenplays, directing films, and taking photographs.

== Marriage and family ==
She married Firdaus Batlivala. They have two children together, son Jahan and daughter Iyanah.

Her children played the roles of Xerxes and Liana, respectively, in her first film, Little Zizou (2008), which she wrote and directed.

== Screenplays ==
Taraporevala wrote the screenplays for Salaam Bombay! and Mississippi Masala, both directed by Mira Nair. Other projects with Nair include the screenplay for My Own Country, based on the book by Abraham Verghese, as well as The Namesake (2006), a cinematic adaptation of Pulitzer–winning writer Jhumpa Lahiri's novel, The Namesake.

Her other produced credits include the film Such a Long Journey based on the novel Such a Long Journey by Rohinton Mistry and directed by Sturla Gunnarson, and the screenplay for the film Dr. Babasaheb Ambedkar, directed by Jabbar Patel for the Government of India and the National Film Development Corporation of India (NFDC).

In 2016 she directed a 14-minute documentary virtual reality film Yeh Ballet for Anand Gandhi's Memesys Culture Lab.

In 2020 she wrote and directed a feature film based on her documentary. The Netflix Original film Yeh Ballet, produced by Siddharth Roy Kapur and Roy Kapur Films, can be seen on Netflix worldwide.

== Photography ==
In 1982, during a break from college, she met photographer Raghubir Singh. He looked at her work, which included photographs of her extended Parsi family, and suggested that she work on a book about the Parsi community. This was a catalyst for her extensive work of documentation of the Parsi community.

...she had the eye, the patience, the empathy of a seasoned portraitist; but she also had something even harder to find — a lifelong, unillusioned, affectionate closeness to an entire community whose numbers were dwindling with every passing year (Pico Iyer, in Home in the City, 2017).

In 2000, she self-published Parsis, the Zoroastrians of India: a photographic journey, 1980-2000. The community had isolated itself since earlier persecution in Persia, and this is the first and only visual documentation of the Parsis. An updated edition was published in 2004.

Her photographs have been exhibited in India, the US, France and Britain, including London's Tate Modern gallery.

She has had solo shows at the Carpenter Center for the Visual Arts at Harvard University, Chemould Prescott Road in Mumbai, and the National Gallery of Modern Art (NGMA) in Delhi. Her work is in the permanent collections of the NGMA Delhi and the Metropolitan Museum of Art, New York.

In 2017/2018, the Whitworth in Manchester exhibited her photographic show Home in the City, Bombay 1977 – Mumbai 2017. It was selected by The Guardian as one of the UK's top 5 shows.

A larger version of Home in the City (with 102 photographs) was exhibited at Chemould Prescott Road, Mumbai, from 14 through 31 October 2017. An accompanying book, Home in the city: Bombay 1977 – Mumbai 2017, was released with essays by authors Pico Iyer and Salman Rushdie. The exhibit traveled to the Sunaparanta, Goa Centre for the Arts in Altinho, Goa, opening there on 11 November 2017.

== Filmography ==
Year	Film	Director	Writer	Notes
1988	Salaam Bombay!	No	Yes	
1991	Mississippi Masala	No	Yes	
1998	Such a Long Journey	No	Yes	
1998	My Own Country	No	Yes	Television film
2000	Dr. Babasaheb Ambedkar	No	Yes	
2006	The Namesake	No	Yes	
2009	Little Zizou	Yes	Yes	
2020	Yeh Ballet	Yes	Yes	
2026	Last Man in Tower	No	Yes	

== Awards ==
- 1988: Lillian Gish Award with Mira Nair, at the Los Angeles Women in Film Festival, for Excellence in Feature Film, for Salaam Bombay!
- 1991: Golden Osella (Best Original Screenplay) 49th Venice International Film Festival: Mississippi Masala
- 2008: Time/Warner Best Screenplay Award at Mahindra Indo-American Arts Council, New York, for Little Zizou
- 2008: Best Director at Mahindra Indo- American Arts Council, New York, for Little Zizou
- 2008: Best Producer at Asian Festival of 1ST Films, Singapore, for Little Zizou
- 2009: Best Director of Experience Section of Levante International Film Festival, Italy, for Little Zizou
- 2009: Audience Choice Award at Indian Film Festival of Los Angeles, (IFFLA) for Little Zizou
- 2014: Padma Shri by Government of India
- 2020: Filmfare nomination for Best Film Web Original, for Yeh Ballet

== Memberships ==
- Academy of Motion Picture Arts and Sciences (2017–present)
- Writers Guild of America (1989–present)
