= Such a Long Journey =

Such a Long Journey may refer to:

- Such a Long Journey (novel), 1991 novel by Indian-Canadian writer Rohinton Mistry
  - Such a Long Journey (film), 1998 Indo-Canadian film by Sturla Gunnarsson, based on the novel

== See also ==
- Journey of the Magi, a 1927 poem by T. S. Eliot which includes the line "For a journey, and such a long journey"
