= Red Dress =

Red Dress or The Red Dress may refer to:

== Events and projects ==
- Red Dress (embroidery project), an international collaborative project created 2009–2022
- Red dress party, an LGBT event
- Red dress run, a Hash House Harriers event
- REDress Project, a Canadian art installation created in 2010 in response to Missing and Murdered Indigenous Women in Canada and the U.S.
  - Red Dress Day, an annual event held by the project

== Film, stage, and television ==
- The Red Dress (La robe rouge), a 1900 play by Eugène Brieux
- The Red Dress (film), or The Red Robe, a 1933 French adaptation of Brieux's play
- The Red Dress, a 2015 television film starring Rachel Skarsten
- The Red Dress, a 2024 film featuring Amiruddin Shah
- "Red Dress" (Malcolm in the Middle), a 2000 television episode

== Songs ==
- "Red Dress" (Sarah Brand song), 2021
- "Red Dress" (Sugababes song), 2006
- "Red Dress", by Andrew Ridgeley from Son of Albert, 1990
- "Red Dress", by Lucy Hale from Road Between, 2014
- "Red Dress", by Magic! from Primary Colours, 2016
- "Red Dress", by Red Velvet from The Red, 2015
- "Red Dress", by TV on the Radio from Dear Science, 2008

== Other uses ==
- Red Dress Boutique, an American online clothing retailer
