= Whereabouts (novel) =

Novel by Jhumpa Lahiri

- First edition (Guanda, 2018)
- Author: Jhumpa Lahiri
- Original title: Dove mi trovo
- Translator: Jhumpa Lahiri
- Language: Italian
- Publisher: Guanda
- Publication date: 30 August 2018
- Publication place: Italy
- English publication date: 27 April 2021
- Media type: Print (softback)
- Pages: 163
- ISBN: 978-88-235-2136-0
- OCLC: 1054299622

Whereabouts (Italian: Dove mi trovo) is a 2018 novel by Jhumpa Lahiri. It is her third novel, her first since The Lowland (2013). It was originally written in Italian, and later translated into English by Lahiri herself.

== Writing and development ==
Whereabouts was first written in Italian, Lahiri's second book in the language after In Other Words, a non-fiction book. Though the city in which the book is set is not disclosed, Lahiri has said it "[...] was born in Rome and set in my head in Rome and written almost entirely on return visits to Rome".

== Synopsis ==
An unnamed narrator travels around an unnamed European city, contemplating her solitude.

== Publication ==
Dove mi trovo was first published in softback in Italy, by the Milan-based publishing house Guanda on 30 August 2018. Lahiri's English translation, titled Whereabouts, was published in hardback in the US by Alfred A. Knopf on 27 April 2021 and in the UK by Bloomsbury Publishing on 4 May 2021.

== Reception ==
In its starred review, Publishers Weekly wrote, "Lahiri's poetic flourishes and spare, conversational prose are on full display."

Kirkus Reviews wrote, "Its spare, reflective prose and profound interiority recall the work of Rachel Cusk and Sigrid Nunez."
