= Family Matters (novel) =

Novel by Rohinton Mistry

- First edition
- Author: Rohinton Mistry
- Language: English
- Genre: Literary Fiction
- Publisher: McClelland and Stewart
- Publication date: 31 December 2001
- Publication place: Canada, India
- Media type: Print (Paperback and Hardback)
- Pages: 500 pp (paperback first edition)
- ISBN: 978-0375703423 (first edition, paperback)
- OCLC: 52069921
- Preceded by: A Fine Balance
- Followed by: The Scream

Family Matters is the third novel published by Indian-born author Rohinton Mistry. It was first published by McClelland and Stewart in 2002. Subsequent editions were published by Faber in UK, Knopf in US and Vintage Books in India. The book is set in Shiv Sena-ruled Bombay.

== Plot ==
Nariman Vakeel is a 79-year-old Parsi widower beset by Parkinson's disease and haunted by memories of the past. He lives with his two middle-aged step-children. When Nariman's illness is compounded by a broken ankle, he is forced to take up residence with his daughter Roxana and her husband Yezad, along with their two sons. This new responsibility for Yezad, who is already besieged by financial worries, proves too much and pushes him into a scheme of deception with devastating consequences.

Parallel to this narrative is the story of Mr. Kapur who envisages peace and freedom from political terror in the city.
