= Yeh Ballet =

- Directed by: Sooni Taraporevala
- Written by: Sooni Taraporevala
- Produced by: Siddharth Roy Kapur
- Starring: Julian Sands; Achintya Bose; Manish Chauhan
- Cinematography: Kartik Vijay
- Edited by: Antara Lahiri
- Production company: Roy Kapur Films
- Distributed by: Netflix
- Release date: 21 February 2020
- Running time: 117 min
- Language: Hindi

Yeh Ballet (lit. 'This Ballet') is a Netflix Original film written and directed by Sooni Taraporevala and produced by Siddharth Roy Kapur. The film features two newcomers—Achintya Bose as Amiruddin Shah, and Manish Chauhan portraying Nishu (a character based on his own life), as the leads. The film also stars Julian Sands, Jim Sarbh, Danish Husain, Vijay Maurya, Heeba Shah, and Kalyanee Mulay. The film is streaming now on Netflix. The film is a fictionalized version of a short documentary by Taraporevala by the same name.

== Plot ==
Discovered by an eccentric ballet master, two gifted but underprivileged Mumbai teens face bigotry and disapproval as they pursue their dancing dreams.

== Cast ==
- Julian Sands as Saul Aron
- Achintya Bose as Asif
- Manish Chauhan as Nishu
- Jim Sarbh as Academy Head
- Danish Husain as Asif's father
- Vijay Maurya as Nishu's father
- Heeba Shah as Asif's mother
- Kalyanee Mulay Nishu's mother
- Sasha Shetty as Nina
- Purva Barve as Nishu's sister
- Mekhola Bose as Asha
- Mikhail Yawalkar as Arjun
- Nizamuddin Shah as Asif's brother
- Sarah-Jane Dias as show judge (Special appearance)
- Boman Irani as show judge (Special appearance)
- Rahul Khanna as show judge (Special appearance)

== Release ==
Yeh Ballet was released on Netflix on 21 February 2020.
