= Unaccustomed Earth =

Collection of short stories by Jhumpa Lahiri

- First edition
- Author: Jhumpa Lahiri
- Language: English
- Genre: Short Stories
- Publisher: Alfred A. Knopf (US); Bloomsbury Press(UK); Random House (India)
- Publication date: April 2008
- Publication place: United States
- Media type: Print (hardback & paperback)
- Pages: 331 pp
- ISBN: 0-7475-9000-1
- OCLC: 213382533
- Preceded by: The Namesake
- Followed by: The Lowland

Unaccustomed Earth is a collection of short stories from American author Jhumpa Lahiri. It is her second collection of stories, following Interpreter of Maladies (which won the Pulitzer Prize for Fiction). As with much of Lahiri's work, Unaccustomed Earth considers the lives of second and third generation Indian American characters and how they deal with their mixed cultural environment. The book was Lahiri's first to top The New York Times Best Seller list, where it debuted at #1.

== Title and contents ==
The title of the collection is taken from a passage in "The Custom-House," the preface to The Scarlet Letter by Nathaniel Hawthorne. Four of the eight stories ("Hell-Heaven", "Nobody's Business", "Once in a Lifetime", and "Year's End") were previously published in The New Yorker.

== Part One ==
=== "Unaccustomed Earth" ===
The title story of the book is about the family relationships between three generations: the father, his daughter, Ruma, and her son, Akash. The father, a retiree and recent widower, visits his daughter's new home in the suburbs of Seattle. Ruma has left her successful legal career to raise children, and her husband works hard to support the family. Although more traditional, her father tries to persuade her to continue her legal career while being a mother. The father was somewhat unhappy with his once-traditional lifestyle and is enjoying his newly found independence in his travels and a relationship with a new female friend. The father and the daughter have limited communication, both afraid to acknowledge that they have moved away from their Bengali culture and have embraced aspects of the American culture. Akash, the grandson, is completely immersed in American culture but becomes fascinated by his grandfather's habits, such as his language, that are foreign to him.

The story explores gender roles in America and family issues associated with Ruma's Bengali heritage, including her sense of obligation to care for her father and have him live with her and her immediate family. Also present is the dilemma of coming between another person's happiness, a situation Ruma encounters when she learns of her father's love interest.

=== "Hell-Heaven" ===
Pranab Chakraborty, a graduate student at MIT, is contemplating returning to Calcutta due to homesickness. On the streets of Boston, he sees a little girl, Usha, and her traditional Bengali mother, Aparna. He follows them and ends up befriending them. Aparna, herself homesick and lonely, empathizes with Pranab and is happy to feed him. Pranab Kaku ("Uncle Pranab") becomes a regular visitor at their house and calls Aparna "Boudi" (meaning "elder brother's wife"). Over time, Aparna looks forward eagerly to Pranab's visits and develops a unique kind of love towards him. Adding to the situation is Usha's father's (Shyamal da) aloof and detached attitude towards her mother. Aparna's love for Pranab turns into jealousy when Pranab brings home an American woman, Deborah, whom he eventually marries. Aparna continuously blames and criticizes Deborah, stating that it is just a matter of time before Deborah leaves Pranab. After twenty-three years, Deborah and Pranab finally divorced. The story also recounts the unique mother-daughter relationship that develops between Aparna and Usha; after many struggles and squabbles, Aparna placates her daughter by relating her own experiences about a foolish decision that she would have made.

The title is drawn from this passage in the story: "'He used to be so different. I don't understand how a person can change so suddenly. It's just hell-heaven, the difference,' she would say, always using the English words for her self-concocted, backward metaphor."

=== "A Choice of Accommodations" ===
Amit and his wife, Megan, travel to his high school alma mater, Langford, for Pam's wedding. Pam, the daughter of the headmaster of Langford, and Amit were close despite never having a formal relationship with each other. Both Amit and Megan are insecure on the night of the wedding; Amit mainly for mistaking his former classmate "Ted" for "Tim," and Megan mainly because there is a small burn on her skirt. After consuming two spiked punches, he is completely drunk; he admits to a guest nearby that he feels detached from Megan. He later remembers that he has to call Megan's in-laws to check in on their daughters. Since reception for cell phones is poor at Langford, he returns to the hotel to use their room's landline, but before he can remember the number, he crashes.

Amit wakes up, shocked to learn that it is late the next morning. Megan, sitting outside on the balcony, expresses her discontent. Remembering that Pam mentioned a brunch, they head back to Langford. They find out that the brunch ended an hour ago. Despite this, they roam Langford together, and when they arrive at one of the dorms, Megan asks about Amit's sexual past and even suspects that he slept with Pam. He denies this, and they ultimately have sex in the dorm.

=== "Only Goodness" ===
Sudha, while visiting home in Wayland from Penn for Christmas, agrees with her teenage brother, Rahul, to sneak beer into their parents' house. He agrees and even purchases vodka. The following summer, they see each other again, and it is revealed that Rahul's first-term grades at Cornell are dramatically lower than his high school grades, which causes concern to their parents. He is also arrested for possession of alcohol while driving. Meanwhile, Sudha has been accepted into the London School of Economics. A few years go by; Rahul drops out, and Sudha becomes engaged to Roger, a Brit, a decision that their parents approve of highly. Rahul lives with their parents, working a menial job.

Shortly before Sudha's wedding, Rahul announces that he is engaged to a woman named Elena. This causes a rift in their family. Further, at the wedding, Rahul's alcoholism becomes apparent to everyone when he fights with their father over the microphone while he is toasting. This causes Rahul to become disconnected from the family for a few years. Meanwhile, Sudha, while living in London, gives birth to a boy, Neel. She responds to Rahul, who originally gave notice that he is coming to London to visit them. Rahul acts as a responsible uncle to Neel; he reveals that he has given up alcohol and takes care of Elena's daughter, Crystal. He becomes close to Neel. One day near the end of his visit, he suggests that Sudha and Roger go out for a movie and leave him at the apartment with Neel. Skeptical, they agree given that Rahul has been exemplary during his time in London. Sudha and Roger return to find Rahul passed out and Neel in the bath, which causes a quarrel between Sudha and Roger. Rahul awakens and learns that he somehow, against all of his willpower, consumed some alcohol. He leaves, realizing that he has lost Sudha's trust forever. At the same time, Sudha feels partly responsible for her naive actions many years before.

=== "Nobody's Business" ===
Sang, short for Sangeeta, receives calls from suitors often, which alarms her housemates, Paul and Heather. However, Sang rejects all of them as she is in a relationship with Farouk, an Egyptian man. During the fall, this relationship becomes muddled. While Sang is in London and Heather is out on a skiing trip in the winter, Paul receives a call from a woman identifying herself as Deirdre. Deirdre obsessively calls the house, and Paul learns that she is a lover of Farouk and is currently in Vancouver; he decides not to tell this to Sang when she returns. A few months later, Sang learns that Deirdre called, and when Paul tells Sang what happened, she calls him a liar. Paul, disgusted at being scapegoated, ruses Deirdre into telling Sang what happened during the winter over the phone. Sang forgives Paul and asks him to drive her to Farouk's apartment. He does so, and they confront Farouk together. When Farouk begins pushing Paul, the two men fight. Farouk can escape, despite Paul overpowering him. The police arrive to calm the three. Sang, distraught, returns to London.

Shortly after the incident, while in Boston, Paul sees Farouk with a woman. Paul plans to walk past them unnoticed, but Farouk sees him and confronts him. After a peaceful exchange, Farouk walks away with the woman. Paul notices that the woman has a dog, and also remembers that when Deirdre called him, there were intermittent barks in the background.

== Part Two: "Hema and Kaushik" ==
The story revolves around two people who, despite being childhood acquaintances and their families being old friends, lead drastically different lives. Two decades after Kaushik's family stayed with Hema's as houseguests, they meet again by chance, just days before they are to enter into completely different phases of their lives, and they discover a strong connection with one another. The entire story of Hema and Kaushik is divided into three parts.

=== "Once in a Lifetime" ===
This section deals mostly with their childhood and is written in a first-person address from Hema to Kaushik. It tells the story of two families who were close to each other because of shared culture and the common experience of adapting to a new culture, but who are beginning to drift apart due to reasons that become evident as the story progresses.

=== "Year's End" ===
This part is from Kaushik's point of view and tells about his life after his mother's death as he deals with unwanted change and navigates complicated relationships with his recently remarried father, stepmother, and two young stepsisters—a situation that will ultimately influence Kaushik to lead the life of a wanderer.

=== "Going Ashore" ===
The last part is related by an omniscient narrator as Hema and Kaushik meet by chance in Italy after two long decades. Hema, now a college professor, is tormented about her previous affair with a married man and plans to settle down by marrying Navin, someone she barely knows. Kaushik, a world-traveling, successful photojournalist, is preparing to accept a desk job in Hong Kong. In spite of all that, they find their deep connection irresistible. They coincidentally reunite in Rome and relive their younger years together, exploring Italy together. Before leaving for a Christmas vacation, Kaushik asks Hema to leave Navin and come and live with him in Hong Kong. He tells her to brood about it while she is in Calcutta.

Kaushik ultimately dies vacationing in Khao Lak when the 2004 tsunami occurs, never giving Hema a choice regarding their future together.

== Reception ==
Writing in The New York Times, Liesl Schillinger says, "Reading her stories is like watching time-lapse nature videos of different plants, each with its own inherent growth cycle, breaking through the soil, spreading into bloom or collapsing back to earth." Hirsh Sawhney, writing for The Guardian, believes that Lahiri "is at core an old-guard New England writer. Her new book begins with a quote from Hawthorne, and this stirringly existential anthology recalls the New Englander JD Salinger's pessimistic vision of human relationships."

It made number one on the New York Times Book Review list of "10 Best Books of 2008" as chosen by the paper's editors. It also won the 2008 Frank O'Connor International Short Story Award; there was no shortlist as the judges believe "no other title was a serious contender."

== Adaptation ==
A Netflix drama series adaptation of Unaccustomed Earth was announced in April 2025. The series stars Freida Pinto and Siddharth in main roles. It is set to premiere on December 17, 2026. Madhuri Shekar who is also showrunner, John Wells, Nisha Ganatra who directed the first two episodes, Erica Saleh, Erin Jontow, Celia D. Costas and Lahiri all serve as executive producers on the series.
