= Manish Chauhan =

Indian dancer

Manish Chauhan is an Indian dancer. He was the subject of documentary films Yeh Ballet (2020) and Call Me Dancer (2023).
