= The Lowland =

2013 novel by Jhumpa Lahiri

- First edition
- Author: Jhumpa Lahiri
- Language: English
- Published: 2013 Alfred A. Knopf / Random House
- Publication place: United States
- Media type: Print (hardcover)
- Pages: 340
- ISBN: 978-0-30726-574-6
- Preceded by: Unaccustomed Earth

The Lowland is the second novel by American author Jhumpa Lahiri, published by Alfred A. Knopf and Random House in 2013.

The book received praise from critics and was commercially successful. On October 13, 2013, The Lowland reached #5 of the New York Times Best-sellers list of combined print and ebooks. The book also was at #3 on the hardcover list.

== Plot ==
=== Part I ===
Raised in Tollygunge in Calcutta, brothers Subhash and Udayan are inseparable; they find joy in fixing and listening to radios, learning Morse Code, and looking out for each other at school. When they leave home for university studies, their ideologies are challenged; Udayan embraces the Naxalite Movement while Subhash is more interested in further education in preparation for his career and leaves for graduate studies in Rhode Island. Subhash learns that despite the massive bloodshed as a result of the Naxalite Movement, all attention from the press is focused on the Vietnam War; this becomes crystal clear to him when his roommate Richard, an earnest student activist, ignorantly remarks "Naxalbari? What's that?" At the end of his first year in the United States, Subhash learns that Udayan has found a wife, Gauri.

=== Part II ===
Gauri, who meets Udayan through her brother, is at first apathetic to him. As time passes, however, they talk and trade ideas. Udayan tells of his CPI(M) days while Gauri discusses philosophy. Udayan proves his love for Gauri when he waits for her indefinitely outside a movie theater. Meanwhile, Subhash befriends Holly and her son Joshua, who he meets on a beach in Rhode Island. He learns that she is a single mother, separated from her husband Keith. They have sex one night while Joshua is at his father's place. Despite this, Subhash wonders at how Holly is able to be so calm when communicating with "someone who had hurt her" in Subhash's mind; this is evident when Subhash notices how she is able to calmly relay Keith directions over the telephone on how to treat an ill Joshua who is in his care for the weekend. Holly ultimately decides to go back to Keith for Joshua's sake. Shortly after beginning his third year, Subhash learns from his parents in a letter that Udayan has been killed.

=== Part III ===
Subhash returns to Calcutta to find Gauri staying with his parents, who do not treat her with respect. Gauri is pregnant with Udayan's child. His mother Bijoli and his father plan to take the child and forsake Gauri. He asks what happened to Udayan. His parents refuse to tell him, but Gauri does tell him after initially offering some resistance. After successfully fleeing from the paramilitary police one night, the police come to his parents' house. The police chief orders his parents and Gauri onto the street and threaten to kill them if Udayan does not surrender himself. Udayan, nearby in the water, surrenders and is subsequently shot and killed. In order to prevent his parents from taking custody of Gauri's child and out of respect for Udayan, Subhash asks Gauri to marry him and to come and live with him in Rhode Island.

=== Part IV ===
Gauri agrees to Subhash's proposal, but is still distraught. She distracts herself, however, by going to the nearby university and sitting-in on philosophy lectures. She then gives birth to Bela. Shortly after, Subhash and Gauri have sex for the first time, although it is unsatisfying for both parties. Subhash proves to be an outstanding parent to Bela, and this causes Gauri discomfort knowing that he is not her biological father. When Bela is four, he runs into Holly (and Keith) again, but they merely exchange greetings. Subhash asks Gauri to have another child for Bela's sake but she is unsure. Gauri begins to attend graduate school when Bela is five and Subhash agrees to find time to watch Bela. Gauri meets professor Otto Weiss, who notices her talent and encourages her to pursue a doctorate, which she does. Gauri also becomes uneasy with keeping Bela in the dark regarding Udayan and when she expresses this to Subhash they agree that they will tell her one day together. Several times when it is Gauri's responsibility to look after Bela, she neglects that obligation for some alone time. One day, when Subhash returns home early, he learns of this neglect and gives Gauri the silent treatment.

=== Part V ===
Subhash's father dies sometime while Subhash is in the states but Subhash is not able to visit Calcutta to pay his respects until Bela is seven. Subhash brings Bela and tells his mother in a letter not to reveal Udayan's connection to Bela during their stay. However, one day, while Bijoli is in a trance, she asks Bela where her father is before snapping out of it, almost revealing the truth. Bela sees pictures of Udayan and asks Subhash who it is. He responds that he is Udayan, her deceased uncle. During their final days in Calcutta, they go shopping for gifts for Bijoli and Gauri. When they return to Rhode Island, they learn that Gauri has left. She leaves a note in Bengali telling Subhash that he has been a fine father and that he should raise her alone and that she has left for California. As Bela comes of adolescent age, she begins to become more mentally unsound and needs the assistance of a psychologist. She recovers, and during high school, Bela becomes very active in club activities. For college, she attends a Midwest liberal arts school. After graduating, Bela lives a nomadic life, traveling around the United States advocating for conservation of the environment.

=== Part VI ===
After bouncing around all of California teaching, Gauri finds a stable job teaching at presumably one of the Claremont Colleges. Gauri contemplates reaching out to Subhash, Bela, and her friends but never does, living a mostly solitary life. After becoming a notable name in her field, she draws some attention and one day, UCLA graduate student Lorna asks Gauri for help with her dissertation. Gauri develops an ephemeral, lesbian relationship with Lorna, one that she clings to over the years. During his sixties, Subhash runs into Richard again. Subhash learns that Richard has continued his activism throughout his life and is a grandfather. Richard dies shortly afterward and through his funeral, Subhash meets Elise, one of Bela's teachers and they begin a relationship. Bela intermittently visits Subhash and Elise over the years. When she is in her mid-thirties, Bela reveals to Subhash that she is pregnant, but the father is unknown and she wishes to keep it that way. This sends Subhash into a frenzy. He is compelled to reveal Udayan's connection to her. When he does, Bela, upset and disgraced, walks out on him. After spending some time musing, she forgives Subhash and asks to live with him again in Rhode Island; he agrees. She gives birth shortly afterwards to a daughter she names Meghna.

=== Part VII ===
Gauri, in her later years, receives a visit from graduate student Dipankar, who wishes to write a dissertation about the Naxalite movement and SDS and approaches her looking for a primary source (Gauri attended Presidency before moving to Rhode Island). She says that she will help him but does not want to be acknowledged. Gauri also learns of the recent death of Kanu Sanyal and she soberly remembers Udayan. Shortly afterwards, Subhash emails Gauri asking for a formal divorce, which she agrees is the best course of action. Bela meets Drew and they two become engaged after a short courtship. Meanwhile, Gauri visits Subhash's house and finds Bela and her daughter Meghna. Bela, full of enmity, courteously greets Gauri for Meghna's sake, but tells Meghna that Gauri is her great-aunt. When Meghna is out of earshot Bela tells Gauri she can not forgive her. Bela tells Gauri she knows Udayan was her father but that gave Gauri no right to walk out on Subhash and her. Gauri leaves the divorce papers; Bela is glad that she was coincidentally able to spare her father the pain of seeing Gauri again. Gauri then takes a trip back to Kolkata, where, alone and in complete despair, she comes within a step of committing suicide. Later, after returning to California, Gauri receives a letter from Bela saying that Meghna asks about her, that Bela has decided she will tell Meghna the truth someday, and that perhaps at some point in the future, the three of them can try to meet again.

=== Part VIII ===
Subhash and Elise marry and go on their honeymoon to Kenmare. When he sees certain rock formations, he is reminded of Udayan. The final chapter revisits the day Udayan was killed. Udayan is no angel; he participates in murder. Despite this, he feels some regret, feeling that if he had met Gauri a little sooner, he could have saved himself from such a life. As he dies, he thinks fondly of Gauri.

== Development ==
The inspiration for The Lowland came from a real-life incident Lahiri first heard about as a child during one of her frequent family visits to Calcutta. In the late 1960s, two brothers involved in the radical Naxalite movement were executed by the police just a few hundred yards from Lahiri's grandparents' home in Tollygunge. The two brothers' family was forced to watch the execution. She noted that this scene "haunted her for decades, and although she conceived the idea of the novel before publishing her debut collection Interpreter of Maladies, it took her fifteen years for her to feel ready to write it.

== Reception ==
In September 2013, The Lowland was placed on the shortlist for the 2013 Man Booker Prize, which ultimately went to The Luminaries by Eleanor Catton. The following month it was also long-listed for the National Book Award for Fiction, and revealed to be a finalist on 16 October 2013. In April 2014, it was shortlisted for the Baileys Women's Prize for Fiction. It won the DSC Prize for South Asian Literature (2014).

Vogue stated that Lahiri was "at the height of her artistry" in a review for the book. O, The Oprah Magazine called the book "intriguing" while Chicago Tribune called her "A great American writer".

USA Today said, "memorable, potent.." and said of the writer, "(Lahiri) has reached literary high ground with The Lowland."
