= Tales from Firozsha Baag =

Collection of short stories by Rohinton Mistry

First edition

Tales From Firozsha Baag is a collection of 11 short stories by Rohinton Mistry about the residents of Firozsha Baag, a Parsi-dominated apartment complex in Mumbai. Mistry's first book, it was published by Penguin Canada in 1987.

== Stories ==
- "Auspicious Occasion"
- "One Sunday"
- "The Ghost of Firozsha Baag"
- "Condolence Visit"
- "The Collectors"
- "Of White Hairs and Cricket"
- "The Paying Guests"
- "Squatter"
- "Lend Me Your Light"
- "Exercisers"
- "Swimming Lessons"

== Awards ==
- 1983 First Prize, Hart House Literary Contest for "One Sunday" (short story)
- 1984 First Prize, Hart House Literary Contest for "Auspicious Occasion" (short story)
- 1985 Annual Contributors' Prize, Canadian Fiction Magazine
