= The Namesake (novel) =

2003 novel by Jhumpa Lahiri

- First edition cover
- Author: Jhumpa Lahiri
- Cover artist: Philippe Lardy
- Language: English
- Genre: Fiction
- Published: September 2003 Houghton Mifflin
- Publication place: India; United States
- Media type: Print (hardback & paperback) and audio-CD
- Pages: 291 (hardback edition)
- ISBN: 0-395-92721-8 (hardback edition)
- OCLC: 51728729
- Dewey Decimal: 813/.54 21
- LC Class: PS3562.A316 N36 2003
- Preceded by: Interpreter of Maladies
- Followed by: Unaccustomed Earth

The Namesake (2003) is the debut novel by British-American author Jhumpa Lahiri. It explores many of the same emotional and cultural themes as Lahiri's Pulitzer Prize-winning short story collection Interpreter of Maladies. The novel moves between events in Kolkata, Boston, and New York City, and examines the nuances being caught between two conflicting cultures with distinct religious, social, and ideological differences.

== Plot ==
The story begins as Ashoke and Ashima Ganguli, a young Bengali couple, leave Kolkata, India, and settle in Central Square in Cambridge, Massachusetts. Ashoke is an engineering student at the Massachusetts Institute of Technology (MIT). Ashima struggles through language and cultural barriers as well as her own fears as she delivers her first child alone. Had the delivery taken place in Kolkata, she would have had the baby at home, surrounded by family. The delivery is successful, but the new parents learn they cannot leave the hospital before giving their son a legal name.

The traditional naming process in their families is to have an elder who will give the new baby a name, and the parents wait for the letter from Ashima's grandmother. The letter never arrives, and soon after, the grandmother dies. Bengali culture calls for a child to have two names, a pet name to be called by family, and a good name to be used in public. Ashoke suggests the name of Gogol, in honor of the famous Russian author Nikolai Gogol, to be the baby's pet name, and they use this name on the birth certificate. As a young man, Ashoke survived a train derailment with many fatalities. He had been reading a short story collection by Gogol just before the accident, and lying in the rubble of the accident he clutched a single page of the story "The Overcoat" in his hand. With many broken bones and no strength to move or call out, dropping the crumpled page is the only thing Ashoke can do to get the attention of medics looking for survivors. This motivated him to move far away from home and start anew. Though the pet name has deep significance for the baby's parents, it is never intended to be used by anyone other than family. They decide on Nikhil to be his good name.

Gogol grows up perplexed by his pet name. Entering kindergarten, the Gangulis inform their son that he will be known as Nikhil at school. The five-year-old objects, and school administrators send him home with a note pinned to his shirt stating that he would be called Gogol at school, as was his preference. As Gogol progresses through school, he resents his name more and more for its oddness and the strange genius for whom he was named. Ashoke senses that Gogol is not old enough to understand its significance. When he informs his parents that he wishes to change his name, his father reluctantly agrees. Shortly before leaving for college, Gogol legally changes his name to Nikhil Ganguli.

This change in name and Gogol's going to Yale, rather than following his father's footsteps to MIT, sets up the barriers between Gogol and his family. The distance, both geographically and emotionally, between Gogol and his parents continues to increase. He wants to be American, not Bengali. He goes home less frequently, dates American girls, and becomes angry when anyone calls him Gogol. During his college years, he smokes cigarettes and marijuana, goes to many parties, and loses his virginity to a girl he cannot remember.

As he is going home for the summer, Gogol's train is suddenly stopped when a man jumped in front of the train. Ashoke, waiting at the train station for Gogol, becomes concerned and upon arriving home, finally explains the true significance of Gogol's name. Gogol is deeply troubled by this.

After graduating from Columbia University, Gogol obtains a very small apartment in New York City, where he lands a job in an established architectural office. He is stiff, perpetually angry or else always on the lookout for someone to make a stereotypical comment about his background.

At a party, Gogol meets an outgoing girl named Maxine, with whom he begins a relationship. Maxine's parents are financially well off and live in a four-story house in New York City, with one floor occupied entirely by Maxine. Gogol moves in with them, and becomes an accepted member of her family. When Maxine's parents visit her grandparents in the mountains of New Hampshire for the summer, they invite Maxine and Gogol to join them.

Gogol introduces Maxine to his parents. Ashima dismisses Maxine as something that Gogol will eventually get over. Shortly after, Ashoke dies of a heart attack while teaching in Ohio. Gogol travels to Ohio to gather his father's belongings and his father's ashes. Gogol gradually withdraws from Maxine, eventually breaking up with her. He begins to spend more time with his mother and sister, Sonia.

Later, Ashima suggests that Gogol contact Moushumi, the daughter of one of her friends, whom Gogol knew when they were children, and who broke up with her fiancé Graham shortly before their wedding. Gogol is reluctant to meet with Moushumi because she is Bengali, but does so anyway to please his mother.

Moushumi and Gogol are attracted to one another and eventually are married. However, by the end of their first year of marriage, Moushumi becomes restless. She feels tied down by marriage and begins to regret it. Gogol also feels like a poor substitute for Moushumi's ex-fiancée, Graham. He feels betrayed when she casually reveals his old name at a party with her friends. Eventually, Moushumi has an affair with Dimitri, an old acquaintance, the revelation of which leads to the end of their marriage. With Sonia preparing to marry her fiancé, a Chinese-American man named Ben, Gogol is once again alone. As Ashima prepares to return to India, Gogol picks up a collection of the Russian author's stories that his father had given him as a birthday present many years ago.

== Major characters ==
- Nikhil "Gogol" Ganguli, the protagonist, was born to Ashoke and Ashima Ganguli in Boston. He is nicknamed "Gogol" after the Russian author Nikolai Gogol, whose book saved his father's life in a horrific train crash. Although his parents try to have him called "Nikhil" at school, young Gogol will not respond to anything but his nickname. As he ages, however, he is increasingly embarrassed by the oddness of the name and legally changes it to Nikhil before he goes off to college at Yale. This change signals a significant shift in his identity as he distances himself from his Bengali heritage and embraces American culture fully. He continues to study architecture, encouraged by his grandfather's artistic legacy and a defining visit to the Taj Mahal, and then earns a master's degree at Columbia University and works in New York. Gogol has three significant romantic relationships throughout the novel—with Ruth in college, Maxine in New York, and Moushumi, another Bengali American, whom he goes on to marry. His relationship with Maxine reflects his desire to assimilate, but his father's sudden death causes him to reconcile with his family and heritage, and that romance is over. His marriage to Moushumi ends in divorce when she has an affair. In the last chapters, Gogol returns to his family home before it is sold and discovers an old, neglected volume of The Short Stories of Nikolai Gogol, a gift from his now late father. This is where he slowly reconciles with his name, his legacy, and the conflicting dimensions of his identity.
- Ashima Ganguli (née Bhaduri), wife of Ashoke and the mother of Gogol and Sonia, was born and raised in Calcutta and is known as "Monu" in India among her family. She was a college student studying English literature when her parents arranged her marriage to Ashoke Ganguli. Later that year, she moved with him to Cambridge, Massachusetts, and later settled in a Boston suburb, where she raised their two children, Gogol and Sonia. Initially bewildered by loneliness and homesickness, Ashima struggles to settle in America, mourning the loss of her father from abroad and getting used to unfamiliar customs and surroundings. She is slowly transformed, though, into a loving matriarch, making a house full of Bengali customs. She creates a tight-knit family of fellow Bengali immigrants by hosting elaborate parties and adapting Indian recipes with Boston add-ins. As her children get older and her husband temporarily moves to Ohio for his nine-month research appointment, Ashima remains alone in Boston, becoming more direct and independent. After Ashoke's untimely death, she continues her unobtrusive progress, employed part-time at a library and later to spend half the year in Calcutta and the other half in the United States. At the conclusion of the novel, Ashima's life goes back to its roots as she is going to celebrate her final Christmas party.
- Ashoke Ganguli, husband of Ashima and father of Gogol and Sonia, is raised in Calcutta and is called by his pet name "Mithu". Ashoke is an introspective, book-loving boy whose life is altered when he survives a horrific train accident while reading a story by the Russian author Nikolai Gogol. The accident, which nearly claimed his life, turns out to be a wake-up call that provides him with the determination to explore the world, as advised by a fellow passenger he had befriended before the accident. Not only does this event decide his decision to travel to the United States to pursue a Ph.D. in fibre optics at M.I.T., but it also prompts him to name his son "Gogol", in silent thanks for the story that saved his life. After an arranged marriage, Ashima joins him in Cambridge, and the two settle down together in America, eventually ending up in the suburbs of Boston, where Ashoke is a professor at a university. A quiet man, Ashoke is a tender and loving figure nonetheless, grounded in a deep sense of duty and love for his family. He hopes his son will appreciate the meaningful origin of his name, but Gogol dismisses it initially, unaware of its significance. Ashoke finally discloses the truth about the accident to Gogol in his college years, after Gogol has already legally changed his name to "Nikhil". Gogol only late in life, after Ashoke's sudden death from a heart attack on a nine-month research appointment in Ohio.
- Moushumi Mazoomdar, Gogol's wife briefly, is a Bengali-American woman whose cosmopolitan upbringing and intellectual interests shape her complex identity and tormented marriage. The daughter of Bengali parents, Moushumi grew up in London until just before her thirteenth birthday, then moved to Massachusetts with a British accent and a love of literature that distinguishes her from other Bengali children at community events. When her family relocates to New Jersey, she attends college at Brown University as a chemistry and French major before she rashly leaves for Paris, where she gets engaged to a banker named Graham. However, the engagement is called off, and Moushumi begins a Ph.D. in French literature at NYU. After a year of isolation in New York, her parents and Ashima Ganguli arrange for her to be with Gogol. Even though they really love each other and get married, Moushumi will not let go of her last name. The marriage deteriorates with time because Moushumi is intellectually and emotionally suffocated by their shared Bengali-American identity and drawn to the more open universe of her academic and arts-focused friends. She feels suffocated by the marriage and begins an affair with an old friend named Dimitri. After Gogol finds out about her infidelity, their marriage ends in divorce, and Moushumi returns to Paris.
- Sonali "Sonia" Ganguli, Gogol's young sister, Ashima's and Ashoke's daughter, was born five years and nine months after Gogol. Unlike Gogol, Sonia's name was well planned by her parents and avoided giving her a pet name. She is well adapted to American culture and doesn't feel that complex about her identity, as was predicted in her Annaprashana that she is "the true American". She is very close to her family. When she gets older, she moves to San Francisco to study law. When Ashoke dies, Sonia moves back in with Ashima and works in Boston as a paralegal while applying to law schools. Eventually, Sonia becomes engaged to Ben, planning a wedding in Calcutta.

== Development ==
Lahiri, then aged about 20, went to Calcutta for a long leave to visit her family relatives. She was aware that her younger cousin had a friend named Gogol. She had never seen or known anything else about the boy. The name "struck" her, and she wrote down in her notebook just his name. She said that in India, the name Gogol "wasn't strange, just a playful pet name in honor of the writer. No one would think it odd the way they would here." It took her time to accept the name for her character.

Almost a decade later, she added the name Gogol to her list of ideas that help her conceptualize stories. In the early drafts, Lahiri modelled Gogol "more like [her] parents", being born and raised in Calcutta, but later changed and made him closer to her experiences. She knew the ending of the novel but it took her years to develop the other parts of the novel such as the beginning and the structure. The story is mostly imagined as "invention was part of the game", while the core is based on her experiences: having Bengali parents, growing up in a small, academic town in New England, and finding conflict with her real name (she was called Jhumpa, her pet name, most of her life by others rather than her actual name, Nilanjana).

When asked why she wrote in the male voice, she stated that because of the name Gogol and was determined to use the name. She further stated that writing in both male and female voices is difficult, but she liked the "challenge" of writing it from someone else's perspective. Lahiri said that the immigrant experience is more concentrated in this book than in her previous book, Interpreter of Maladies.

== Reception ==
Michiko Kakutani of The New York Times wrote, "Jhumpa Lahiri's quietly dazzling new novel, The Namesake, is that rare thing: an intimate, closely observed family portrait that effortlessly and discreetly unfolds to disclose a capacious social vision." Julie Myerson of The Guardian wrote, "She has a talent - magical, sly, cumulative - that most writers would kill for. Peer closely at any single sentence, and nothing about it stands out. But step back and look at the whole and you're knocked out." Kirkus Reviews said of the novel is "a disappointingly bland follow-up to a stellar story collection."

== Film adaptation ==
A film adaptation of the novel was released in the United States, Canada, the United Kingdom, and India in March 2006. It was directed by Mira Nair and featured a screenplay written by Sooni Taraporevala.

== Bengali version ==
The Namesake was published in Bengali by Ananda Publishers on 2005 under the title Samanamiie (বাংলা:সমনামী) translated by Paulami Sengupta.

== See also ==
- Nikolai Gogol
