= Mitali Banerjee Bhawmik =

Indian Classical Singer

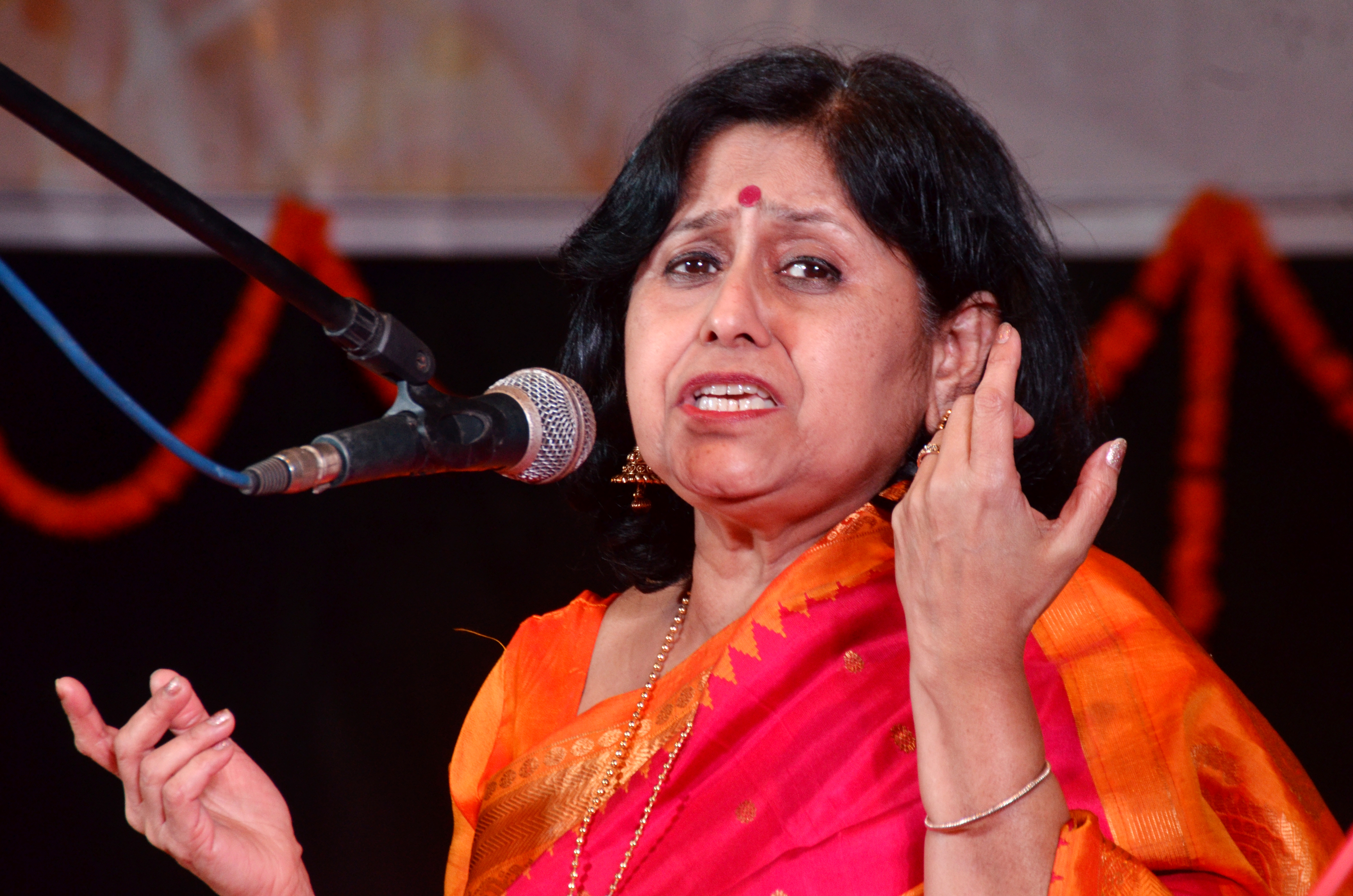
- Mitali Banerjee Bhawmik performing at Nagaon, Assam, India

Background information
- Born: Assam
- Genres: Hindustani classical music
- Website: www.mitalibhawmik.com

Mitali Banerjee Bhawmik is an exponent of Hindustani classical vocal music.

== Early life ==
Mitali Banerjee Bhawmik was born in Nagaon, Assam. She was introduced to Hindustani classical music by her mother Gori Banerjee. Bhawmik began her musical journey receiving her initial lessons from Ajit Dutta. She later underwent extensive training in various styles of Hindustani classical vocal music from Biren Phukan in Guwahati, Assam. In 1983, she moved to Kolkata (then Calcutta) to further her musical education. There, she initially studied under Srimati Meera Banerjee, a vocalist.

In 1989 she moved to New Jersey after her marriage.

== Movies ==
Bhawmik sang for the character played by Tabu in the movie Namesake. She also sang the famous song 'Yamunai Aatrile' for the movie 'Thalapathy' which was released in 1991
