= The Namesake (film) =

2006 Indian-American drama film by Mira Nair

- Theatrical release poster
- Directed by: Mira Nair
- Screenplay by: Sooni Taraporevala
- Based on: The Namesake by Jhumpa Lahiri
- Produced by: Mira Nair; Lydia Dean Pilcher
- Starring: Kal Penn; Tabu; Irrfan Khan; Zuleikha Robinson; Jacinda Barrett; Sebastian Roché; Sahira Nair; Ruma Guha Thakurta; Sabyasachi Chakrabarty; Supriya Devi
- Cinematography: Frederick Elmes
- Edited by: Allyson C. Johnson
- Music by: Nitin Sawhney
- Production companies: UTV Motion Pictures; Mirabai Films; Entertainment Farm
- Distributed by: Fox Searchlight Pictures (International); UTV Motion Pictures (India)
- Release dates: 2 September 2006 (Telluride); 9 March 2007 (United States); 23 March 2007 (India)
- Running time: 121 minutes
- Countries: United States; India; Japan
- Languages: English; Bengali
- Budget: $9.5 million
- Box office: $20.4 million

The Namesake is a 2006 English-language drama film directed by Mira Nair and written by Sooni Taraporevala based on the novel The Namesake by Jhumpa Lahiri. It stars Kal Penn, Tabu, Irrfan Khan, and Sahira Nair. The film was produced by Indian, American and Japanese studios. The film was filmed primarily in Kolkata (Calcutta), India, and New York City from 28 March to June 2005, with some scenes also shot in suburbs of New York and other locations like Sydney, Australia, and Agra, India. This film was released in the United States on 9 March 2007, following screenings at film festivals in Toronto and New York City. The Namesake received positive reviews from American critics.

== Plot ==
The Namesake depicts the struggles of Ashoke and Ashima Ganguli, first-generation immigrants from the state of West Bengal to the United States, and their American-born children Gogol and Sonia. The film takes place primarily in Kolkata, New York City, and suburbs of New York City.

The story begins as Ashoke sits on a train in India and encounters a man who encourages him to travel the world. Shortly after, the train crashes and Ashoke is one of the few survivors. Having had his leg broken and other body parts injured, he recovers at home with his parents.

Once he has recovered, he travels to the US to study. Two years into his PhD, his parents arrange a meeting between him and a girl named Ashima. The two like each other and are soon married.

Ashoke and Ashima leave Kolkata and settle in New York City. Through a series of miscues, their son's nickname, Gogol (named after Russian author Nikolai Gogol), becomes his official birth name and this event will shape many aspects of his life. The story chronicles Gogol's cross-cultural experiences and his exploration of his Bengali heritage, as the story primarily shifts between the United States and Kolkata.

Gogol becomes a lazy, cannabis-smoking teenager who is indifferent to his cultural background. He resents many of the customs and traditions his family upholds and doesn't understand his parents. After an eight-month long trip to India before starting college at Yale, Gogol starts opening up to his culture and becomes more accepting of it.

Shortly after his eighteenth birthday, much to his parents' annoyance, Gogol legally changes his name to "Nikhil" (the name he had supposedly refused to be addressed by when he was in kindergarten). In college, Gogol uses his "good name" Nikhil (later shortened to Nick).

After graduation, he works as an architect. He dates Maxine, a white American woman from a wealthy background, who is clueless about their cultural differences. Gogol introduces her to his parents, who struggle to understand his modern, American perspectives on dating, marriage and love. They are hesitant and guarded when meeting her. Gogol gets along with Maxine's family and feels closer to them than he does to his own family.

Before Ashoke goes to Ohio for a teaching apprenticeship, he tells Gogol the story of the nearly fatal train accident he had suffered years ago back in India and how he came up with his son's name. Shortly after, while Gogol is on vacation with Maxine's family, Ashoke suffers a heart attack and dies in Cleveland, where he had moved temporarily for work. His wife Ashima stayed behind in their home.

Grieving, Gogol tries to be more like what he thinks his parents want him to be and begins following Indian cultural customs more closely. He grows distant from Maxine and eventually breaks up with her due to their cultural differences.

Gogol rekindles a friendship with Moushumi, the daughter of family friends. They begin dating and soon after get married. However, the marriage is short-lived as Moushumi, bored with being a wife, starts having an affair with an old boyfriend from Paris. Gogol divorces her, while Ashima blames herself for pressuring Gogol to marry a fellow Bengali. Gogol returns home to help Ashima pack up the house. He comes across the book (The Collected Tales and Plays by Nikolai Gogol) which Ashoke had given him after his college graduation. Searching for comfort, and accepting his new life alone, Gogol, on the train home, finally reads the stories written by the author whose namesake he is.

In addition to depicting Gogol/Nikhil's experiences, the film explores the courtship and marriage of Ashima and Ashoke, and the effect on the family from Ashoke's early death. By carrying out his father's funeral rites on the banks of the Ganges, Gogol begins to appreciate Indian culture. Ashima's decision to sell the suburban American family home and return to Kolkata for part of each year, unifies and closes the film.

== Cast ==
- Kal Penn as Nikhil "Gogol" Ganguli
  - Soham Chatterjee as child Gogol aged four years
- Tabu as Ashima Ganguli
- Irrfan Khan as Ashoke Ganguli
- Sahira Nair as Sonia Ganguli
- Jacinda Barrett as Maxine Ratcliffe
- Sebastian Roché as Chris Wright
- Linus Roache as Mr Joshua Lawson (Gogol's teacher)
- Glenne Headly as Lydia
- Zuleikha Robinson as Moushumi Majumdar
- Ruma Guha Thakurta as Ashoke's mother
- Sabyasachi Chakrabarty as Ashima's father
- Supriya Devi as Ashima's grandmother
- Jagannath Guha as Ghosh
- Sukanya Chakraborty as Rini
- Tanushree Shankar as Ashima's mother
- Tamal Roy Chowdhury as Ashoke's father
- Jhumpa Lahiri as Jhumpa Mashi
- Brooke Smith as Sally

The film has cameo appearances by actor Samrat Chakrabarti, academic Partha Chatterjee and visual artist Naeem Mohaiemen.

== Development ==
Director Mira Nair was inspired to make The Namesake after the sudden death of her mother-in-law due to medical malpractice, saying that "Jhumpa [Lahiri] has written in it of this terrible melancholy of losing a parent in a foreign country, which is exactly what I was experiencing.” Approximately a month out from shooting, Warner Bros. Pictures offered her the opportunity to direct Harry Potter and the Order of the Phoenix on the strength of Vanity Fair. She credited her then fourteen-year-old son, Zohran Mamdani, with persuading her to direct The Namesake instead, saying that he had told her that while many good directors could make Harry Potter, only she could make The Namesake. Initially Rani Mukerji was considered for the principal lead, but due to scheduling conflicts with Karan Johar's Kabhi Alvida Naa Kehna, the role then went to Tabu. Nair initially considered Abhishek Bachchan for the role of Gogol, but Kal Penn was strongly recommended by her son, who was a fan of Harold & Kumar Go to White Castle (in 2025, Penn returned the favor by helping Mamdani's campaign to become mayor of New York City); Penn had previously become interested in the project after reading the novel on the recommendation of John Cho, his Harold and Kumar co-star, and the two had discussed acquiring the film rights before learning that Nair was already working on an adaptation.

== Soundtrack ==
The soundtrack has varied music: Indian, Anglo-Indian (by Nitin Sawhney, influenced by Ravi Shankar's music for Pather Panchali), and a French piece. Acharya Jayanta Bose composed the "Boatman's Song" for the film, along with Nitin Sawhney. One British Indian electronica piece is State of Bengal's "IC408." The ringtone from Moushumi's mobile phone is the song "Riviera Rendezvous" by Ursula 1000 from the album Kinda' Kinky; this is the same song that is played when Gogol and Moushumi first sleep together. The Indian classical pieces (performed on screen by Tabu) were sung by Mitali Banerjee Bhawmik, a New Jersey–based musician.

== Critical reception ==
The film received favorable reviews from critics. Review aggregator Rotten Tomatoes reports that 85% of critics gave the film positive reviews, based on 136 reviews. The website's consensus reads, "An ambitious exploration of the immigrant experience with a talented cast that serves the material well". Metacritic reported the film had an average score of 82 out of 100, based on 33 reviews, indicating "universal acclaim".

=== Top ten lists ===
The film appeared on several critics' top ten lists of the best films of 2007.

- 6th – Peter Rainer, The Christian Science Monitor
- 8th – Carrie Rickey, The Philadelphia Inquirer
- 8th – Claudia Puig, USA Today
- 9th – James Berardinelli, ReelViews

=== Awards and nominations ===
- Won – Love is Folly International Film Festival (Bulgaria) – "Golden Aphrodite" – Mira Nair
- Nominated – Casting Society of America – "Best Feature Film Casting" – Cindy Tolan
- Nominated – Gotham Awards 2007 – "Best Film" – Mira Nair and Lydia Dean Pilcher
- Nominated – Independent Spirit Award – "Best Supporting Male" – Irrfan Khan

== See also ==
- Nikolai Gogol's "The Overcoat"
