= Such a Long Journey (film) =

- Directed by: Sturla Gunnarsson
- Screenplay by: Sooni Taraporevala
- Based on: Such a Long Journey by Rohinton Mistry
- Produced by: Simon MacCorkindale; Paul Stephens
- Starring: Roshan Seth; Soni Razdan; Om Puri; Naseeruddin Shah; Kurush Deboo; Vrajesh Hirjee
- Cinematography: Jan Kiesser
- Edited by: Jeff Warren
- Music by: Jonathan Goldsmith
- Production companies: The Film Works; Amy International Artists
- Release date: 1998
- Running time: 113 minutes
- Countries: Canada; United Kingdom
- Language: English

Such a Long Journey is a 1998 Indo-Canadian English-language film based on the novel of the same name written by Rohinton Mistry. The film is directed by Sturla Gunnarsson with a screenplay by Sooni Taraporevala. It stars Roshan Seth and Soni Razdan. The film received twelve Genie Awards nominations including the Best Picture, Best Director, and Best Actor. The film was screened at the Toronto International Film Festival.

== Plot ==
Gustad Noble (Roshan Seth) is a Parsi bank clerk who lives with his family in Bombay (Mumbai), just before the Indo-Pakistani War of 1971. At first, he seems to be a self-centered, self-involved, neurotic man, who is so tied up in his own pain for perceived slights both past and present that he cannot seem to connect with either friends or family.

He is haunted by memories of his privileged youth and his father's fortune, which has been lost to the machinations of an unscrupulous uncle. He is baffled by the changes wrought in his eldest son, Sohrab (Vrajesh Hirjee), who refuses to attend the Indian Institute of Technology to which he has gained admittance, and worried about his youngest daughter, Roshan, when she falls ill. Other conflicts involve Gustad's ongoing interactions with his eccentric neighbors and his relationship with his close friend and co-worker, Dinshawji. Tehmul, a seemingly unimportant and mentally disabled character, is essential in Gustad's life, as he brings out his tender side and represents innocence in life.

A letter that Gustad receives one day from an old friend, Major Bilimoria, slowly draws him into a government deception involving threats, secrecy, and large amounts of money. He then begins the long journey that sheds new light on all aspects of Gustad's life.

== Production ==
The production of the film underwent several challenges related to casting, funding and concerns about censoring. These topics are covered in two interviews in Rungh: the first with the filmmaker Sturla Gunnarsson and the second with the actor Naseeruddin Shah.

== Cast ==
- Roshan Seth as Gustad Noble
- Soni Razdan as Dilnavaz Noble
- Om Puri as Ghulam Mohamed
- Naseeruddin Shah as Major Jimmy Bilimoria
- Ranjit Chowdhry as Pavement Artist
- Sam Dastor as Dinshawji
- Kurush Deboo as Tehmul
- Pearl Padamsee as Mrs. Kutpitia
- Vrajesh Hirjee as Sohrab Noble
- Dinyar Contractor as Rabadi
- Souad Faress as Mrs. Rabadi
- Irrfan Khan as Gustad's dad
- Anahita Uberoi as Gustad's mom
- Anupam Shyam as milkman
- Shazneed Damania as Roshan Noble
- Kurush Dastur as Darius Noble
- Noshirwan Jehangir as Inspector Bamji
- Shivani Jha as Jasmine Rabadi
- Madan as Bank Manager
- Aileen Gonsalves as Lewie Coutinho
- Sunny Bharti as Prostitute
- Pratima Kazmi as Prostitute
- Madhav Sharma
- Antony Zaki
- Mehler Jehangir
- Sohrab Ardeshir
- Rashid Karapiet
- Chatru L. Gurnani
