= Jhumpa Lahiri =

Indian-American author (born 1967)

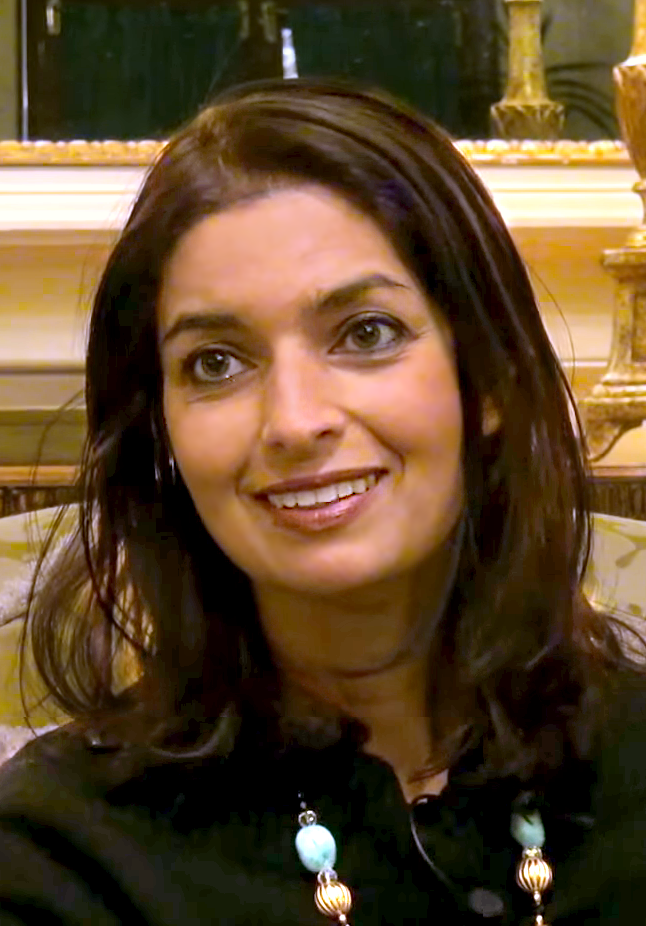
- Lahiri in 2015
- Born: Nilanjana Sudeshna Lahiri; July 11, 1967 (age 59); London, England
- Education: Barnard College (BA); Boston University (MA, MFA, MA, PhD)
- Occupation: Author
- Spouse: Alberto Vourvoulias-Bush (m. 2001)
- Children: 2
- Writing career
- Period: 21st century
- Genres: Novel, short story, postcolonial
- Notable works: Interpreter of Maladies (1999); The Namesake (2003); Unaccustomed Earth (2008); The Lowland (2013)
- Notable awards: 1999 O. Henry Award; 2000 Pulitzer Prize for Fiction; 2021 Dottorato Ad Honorem, University of Bologna
- Website: www.randomhouse.com/kvpa/jhumpalahiri/

Jhumpa Nilanjana Sudeshna Lahiri (Bengali pronunciation: [d͡ʒʱumpa laːɦiɽi]; born July 11, 1967) is a British-American author known for her short stories, novels, and essays in English and, more recently, in Italian.

Her debut collection of short stories, Interpreter of Maladies (1999), won the Pulitzer Prize for Fiction and the PEN/Hemingway Award, and her first novel, The Namesake (2003), was adapted into the popular film of the same name.

The Namesake was a New York Times Notable Book, a Los Angeles Times Book Prize finalist, and was made into a major motion picture. Unaccustomed Earth (2008) won the Frank O'Connor International Short Story Award, while her second novel, The Lowland (2013) was a finalist for both the Man Booker Prize and the National Book Award for Fiction. On January 22, 2015, Lahiri won the US$50,000 DSC Prize for South Asian Literature for The Lowland. In these works, Lahiri explored the Indian-immigrant experience in America.

In 2012, Lahiri moved to Rome and has since then published two books of essays, and began writing in Italian, first with the 2018 novel Dove mi trovo, then with her 2023 collection Roman Stories. She also compiled, edited, and translated the Penguin Book of Italian Short Stories which consists of 40 Italian short stories written by 40 different Italian writers. She has also translated some of her own writings and those of other authors from Italian into English. Lahiri is currently completing a translation (with Yelena Baraz) of Ovid’s Metamorphoses.

In 2014, Lahiri was awarded the National Humanities Medal. She was a professor of creative writing at Princeton University from 2015 to 2022. In 2022, she became the Millicent C. McIntosh Professor of English and Director of Creative Writing at her alma mater, Barnard College of Columbia University.

== Early life and education ==
Nilanjana Sudeshna Lahiri was born in London, the daughter of Bengali Hindu immigrants Amar Lahiri and Tapati "Tia" Lahiri (née Sanyal) from the Indian state of West Bengal. Her father hailed from Tollygunge. Her mother hailed from North Kolkata. Her father moved to London in 1966, followed by her mother in 1967. They lived in Finsbury Park. In 1969, her family moved to Cambridge, Massachusetts, when she was three. She has a sister, Simanti Lahiri, born in the United States in November 1974, who currently works for Rutgers University as a project coordinator.

Lahiri is both an American and a British citizen. According to Lahiri, she was an Indian citizen as she acquired an Indian passport and was appended to her mother’s passport. "It meant something to [her] mother emotionally," but it "always seemed wrong" to her. She had to renounce her Indian citizenship when she became a naturalized American. It was only later that she received the British passport. Lahiri considers herself an "American" and has said, "I wasn't born here, but I might as well have been."

After a year in Cambridge, her family moved to South Kingstown, Rhode Island. Lahiri grew up in Kingston, Rhode Island, where Amar worked as a librarian at the University of Rhode Island; the protagonist in "The Third and Final Continent", the story which concludes Interpreter of Maladies, is modeled after him. Tia, a schoolteacher, wanted her children to grow up knowing their Bengali heritage, and her family often visited relatives in Calcutta (now Kolkata). Her mother was an avid reader of Bengali literature and occasionally wrote Bengali poems. Lahiri recalled that her maternal grandfather, Phani Bhushan Sanyal, a visual artist who died when she was six, would invent stories to tell her. She can speak and understand the Bengali language fluently, but she cannot read it. It was the language she used to communicate with her parents, and she was "strictly forbidden" to speak any other language apart from Bengali until the age of four.

When Lahiri began kindergarten, her teachers called her Jhumpa, the name used at her home, because it was easier to pronounce than her more formal given name. Lahiri recalled, "I always felt so embarrassed by my name.... You feel like you're causing someone pain just by being who you are." That was the time when she quickly acquired the English language, "but her parents, especially her mother, never liked her speaking it." She started to write as a child and would steal "one or two" extra notebooks from school closets, which marked her "first dishonest act", and would write fiction, mostly "stories about the victims of mean girls." She still prefers writing in notebooks. She never showed her writing to any adults. At the age of nine, she "self-published" her first book in 1976 The Life of a Weighing Scale (also titled The Adventures of a Weighing Scale), which she wrote from the perspective of a bathroom scale, for her school contest that she won and that "everyone had to write a book. The prize was that it got to be in the school library."

She loved acting in plays but was typically cast as the villain such as the Witch in "Hansel and Gretal", the Queen of Hearts in Alice in Wonderland and Fagin in Oliver Twist, as she thinks "that was partly because I wasn't blond and white, to cut to the chase." In her teenage years and beyond, the desire to construct stories were there but her "writing shrank in what seemed to be an inverse proportion to my years" due to her self-doubt and insecurity. She practised music and performed in plays. With the aspiration to be a journalist, she "worked with words" and wrote articles and essays.

Her ambivalence over her identity was the inspiration for the mixed feelings of Gogol, the protagonist of her novel The Namesake, over his own unusual name. In an editorial in Newsweek, Lahiri claims that she has "felt intense pressure to be two things, loyal to the old world and fluent in the new." Much of her experiences growing up as a child were marked by these two sides, Indian and American, tugging away at one another. When she became an adult, she was able to be part of these two dimensions without the embarrassment and struggle that she had when she was a child. They 'intertwined' and, due to the now more prevalent use of the term, she refers to herself as 'Indian American'.

Lahiri graduated from South Kingstown High School and received her B.A. in English literature from Barnard College in 1989. She decided in college that she wanted to be an English professor. The thought of being a writer was low as she wanted to be an ordinary person. She kept a few diaries in her childhood and adolescence, but she has been seriously keeping diaries from her twenties to this day.

Lahiri then moved to Boston to pursue a PhD, and lived in a rented room within a household of non-relatives. She worked at a bookstore with responsibilities that included opening shipments and operating a cash register. She befriended a fellow bookstore employee whose father, Bill Corbett, was a poet. She frequently visited the Corbett family home, which was "filled with books and art", and spent an entire summer living in the Corbett home. She wrote a few sketches and fragments on a typewriter whenever she was alone.

In 1997, while Lahiri was completing her dissertation, she soon secretly aspired again to be a writer after feeling burned out on academia. That year, she also worked as an unpaid intern at Boston magazine, writing "flattering items about consumer products." She shared her writings with someone who motivated her to "sit down and produce something." On weekends and at night, she typed stories onto a computer in the office where she worked as a research assistant. She even bought a copy of Writer's Market and submitted stories to small literary magazines, but faced multiple rejections. She enrolled in Boston University to pursue a Master's of English literature. One day, she audaciously requested to sit in on a creative-writing class open only to writing students. Leslie Epstein, the director of the creative writing program at Boston University, made an exception, which led her to formally apply to the program the next year with a fellowship. Her parents were neutral about the decision. At the age of 30, she wrote "A Temporary Matter", her first short story written as an adult, which later became included in her debut short story collection, Interpreter of Maladies.

She earned advanced degrees from Boston University: an M.A. in English, an M.F.A. in Creative Writing, an M.A. in Comparative Literature, and a PhD in Renaissance Studies. Her dissertation, completed in 1997, was titled Accursed Palace: The Italian Palazzo on the Jacobean Stage (1603–1625). Her principal advisers were William Carroll (English) and Hellmut Wohl (Art History). She took a fellowship at Provincetown's Fine Arts Work Center, which lasted for the next two years (1997–1998). Lahiri has taught creative writing at Boston University and the Rhode Island School of Design.

== Literary career ==
Lahiri's early short stories faced rejection from publishers "for years". In 1998, she published "Interpreter of Maladies", a short story that received positive reviews and was included in The Best American Short Stories 1999, edited by authors Katrina Kenison and Amy Tan. Her debut short story collection, also titled Interpreter of Maladies, was finally released in 1999. The stories address sensitive dilemmas in the lives of Indians or Indian immigrants, with themes such as marital difficulties, the bereavement over a stillborn child, and the disconnection between first and second-generation United States immigrants. Lahiri later wrote, "When I first started writing, I was not conscious that my subject was the Indian-American experience. What drew me to my craft was the desire to force the two worlds I occupied to mingle on the page as I was not brave enough, or mature enough, to allow in life." The collection was praised by American critics, but received mixed reviews in India, where reviewers were alternately enthusiastic and upset Lahiri had "not paint[ed] Indians in a more positive light." Interpreter of Maladies sold 600,000 copies and received the 2000 Pulitzer Prize for Fiction (only the seventh time a story collection had won the award).

In 2003, Lahiri published her first novel, The Namesake. The theme and plot of this story were influenced in part by a family story she heard growing up. Her father's cousin was involved in a train wreck and was only saved when the workers saw a beam of light reflected off a watch he was wearing. Similarly, the protagonist's father in The Namesake was saved after a train wreck because a rescuer's flashlight illuminated the fluttering white page of the father's book, written by Russian author Nikolai Gogol. The father and his wife emigrated to the United States as young adults. After this life-changing experience, he named his son Gogol and his daughter Sonali. Together the two children grow up in a culture with different mannerisms and customs that clash with what their parents have taught them. A film adaptation of The Namesake was released in March 2007, directed by Mira Nair and starring Kal Penn as Gogol and Bollywood stars Tabu and Irrfan Khan as his parents. Lahiri herself made a cameo as "Aunt Jhumpa".

Lahiri's second collection of short stories, Unaccustomed Earth, was released on April 1, 2008. Upon its publication, Unaccustomed Earth achieved the rare distinction of debuting at number 1 on The New York Times best seller list. The New York Times Book Review editor Dwight Garner stated, "It's hard to remember the last genuinely serious, well-written work of fiction—particularly a book of stories—that leapt straight to No. 1; it's a powerful demonstration of Lahiri's newfound commercial clout."

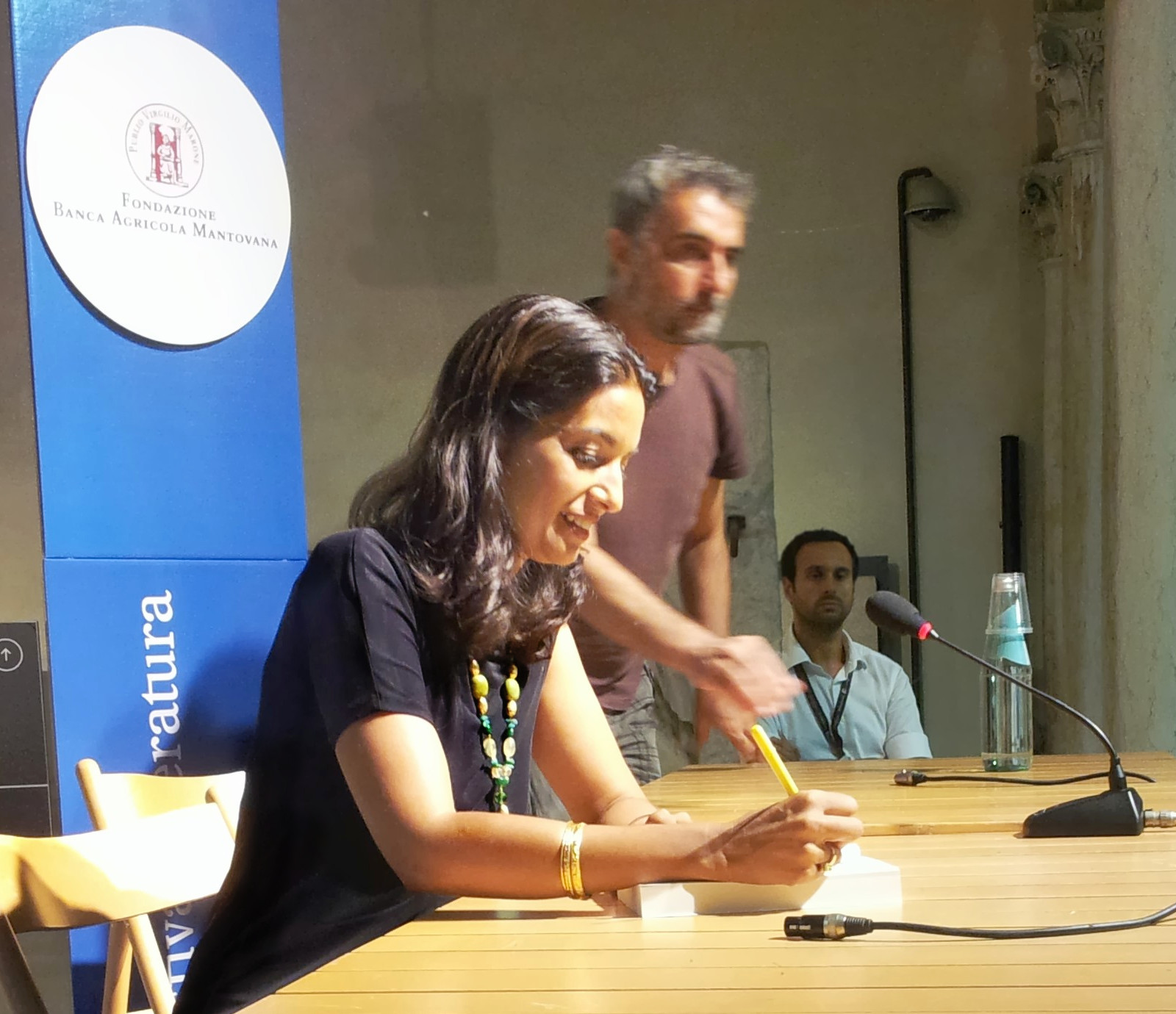
Lahiri in 2013 at the Palazzo San Sebastiano for the Festivaletteratura.

In February 2010, she was appointed a member of the President's Committee on the Arts and Humanities, along with five others.

In September 2013, her novel The Lowland was placed on the shortlist for the Man Booker Prize, which ultimately went to The Luminaries by Eleanor Catton. The following month, it was also longlisted for the National Book Award for Fiction and revealed to be a finalist on October 16, 2013. However, on November 20, 2013, it lost out for that award to James McBride and his novel The Good Lord Bird.

In December 2015, Lahiri published a non-fiction essay called "Teach Yourself Italian" in The New Yorker about her experience learning Italian. In the essay she declared that she is now only writing in Italian, and the essay itself was translated from Italian to English. That same year, she published her first book in Italian, In altre parole, in which she wrote about her experience learning the language; an English translation by Ann Goldstein titled In Other Words was published in 2016.

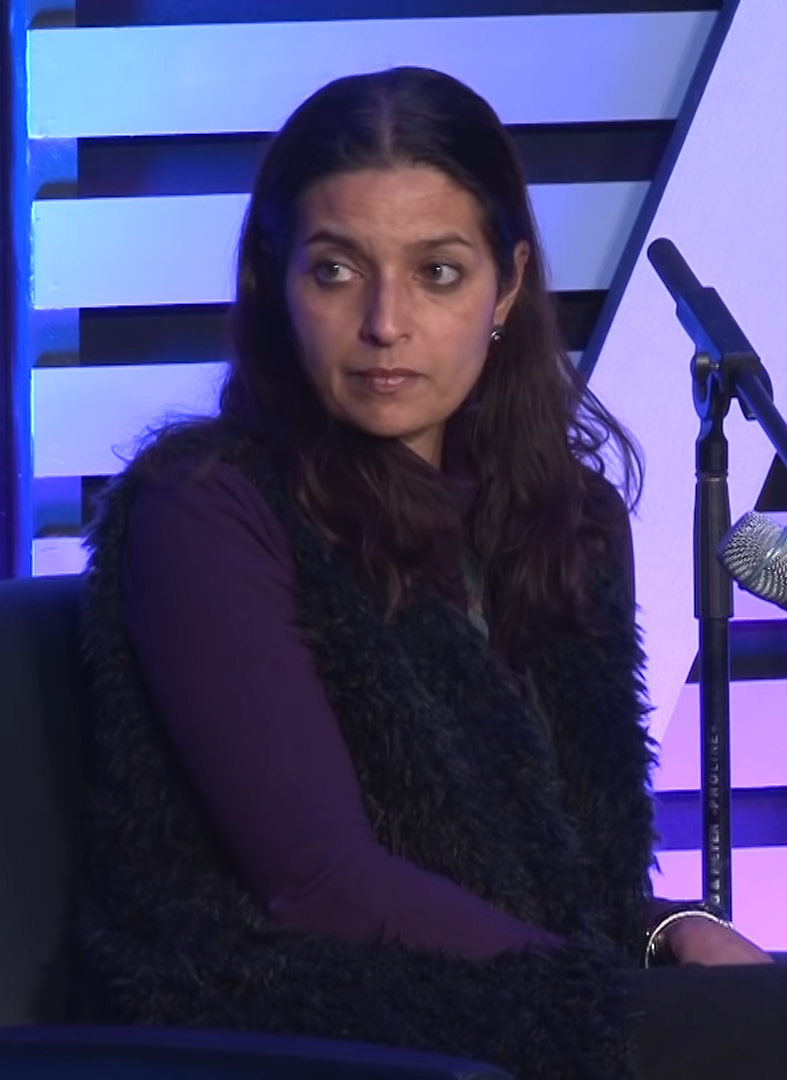
Lahiri at a meeting at George Mason University in 2016.

Lahiri was the winner of the DSC Prize for South Asian Literature 2015 for her book The Lowland at the Zee Jaipur Literature Festival, for which she entered the Limca Book of Records.

In 2017, Lahiri received the PEN/Malamud Award for excellence in the short story.

In 2018, Lahiri published her first novel in Italian, Dove mi trovo (2018). In 2019, she compiled, edited, and translated the Penguin Book of Italian Short Stories which consists of 40 Italian short stories written by 40 different Italian writers. Lahiri later translated Dove mi trovo into English; the translation, Whereabouts, was published in 2021. In 2022, Lahiri published a new short story collection under the title Racconti Romani (Roman stories), the title being a nod to a book by Alberto Moravia of the same name. The English translation, Roman Stories, was published in October 2023, translated by Lahiri and Todd Portnowitz.

A Netflix drama series adaptation of Unaccustomed Earth was announced in April 2025 and is in development. Production will be done by John Wells Production. The series stars Freida Pinto and Siddharth in main roles. Nisha Ganatra, Erica Saleh, Erin Jontow, Celia D. Costas and Lahiri all serve as executive producers. The series started filming in September 2025.

== Literary focus ==
Lahiri's writing is characterized by her "plain" language and her characters, often Indian immigrants to America who must navigate between the cultural values of their homeland and their adopted home. Lahiri's fiction is autobiographical and frequently draws upon her own experiences as well as those of her parents, friends, acquaintances, and others in the Bengali communities with which she is familiar. Lahiri examines her characters' struggles, anxieties, and biases to chronicle the nuances and details of immigrant psychology and behavior.

Until Unaccustomed Earth, she focused mostly on first-generation Indian American immigrants and their struggle to raise a family in a country very different from theirs. Her stories describe their efforts to keep their children acquainted with Indian culture and traditions and to keep them close even after they have grown up to hang onto the Indian tradition of a joint family, in which the parents, their children and the children's families live under the same roof.

Unaccustomed Earth departs from this earlier original ethos, as Lahiri's characters embark on new stages of development. These stories scrutinize the fate of the second and third generations. As succeeding generations become increasingly assimilated into American culture and are comfortable in constructing perspectives outside of their country of origin, Lahiri's fiction shifts to the needs of the individual. She shows how later generations depart from the constraints of their immigrant parents, who are often devoted to their community and their responsibility to other immigrants.

== Influences ==
When Lahiri began "writing seriously", she studied stories by James Joyce, Gabriel Garcia Marquez, Anton Chekhov, Flannery O’Connor, Vladimir Nabokov and Virginia Woolf to understand narrative structure and character development. She is "eternally indebted" to William Trevor and Mavis Gallant. She cites as other major influences Dante and Horace, as well as the short stories of Gina Berriault, John Cheever, Andre Dubus, Bernard Malamud, Giorgio Manganelli, Alberto Moravia, and Alice Munro. Her favourite novelist is Thomas Hardy.

Lahiri’s practice of writing begins in journaling, a habit she traces to her reading of the diaries of Woolf, André Gide, and especially Anne Frank, whom she read a young age. She has said that she can “trace my writing back” to Frank’s The Diary of a Young Girl which she read first, adding, “I learned so much from her about how to be a writer, about how a writer inhabited life and space and listened to people and just saw things." Lahiri has noted that writing her own diaries "became a laboratory for things that I do," and that the Italian poetry collection Il quaderno di Nerina came from her diary writing.

== Television ==
Lahiri worked on the third season of the HBO television program In Treatment. That season featured a character named Sunil, a widower who moves to the United States from India and struggles with grief and with culture shock. Although she is credited as a writer on these episodes, her role was more as a consultant on how a Bengali man might perceive Brooklyn.

== Activism ==
In September 2024, Lahiri withdrew her acceptance of the Isamu Noguchi Award given by the Noguchi Museum in New York City in protest over the museum's decision to fire three employees for wearing keffiyehs in solidarity with Palestine. In October 2024, Lahiri signed an open letter alongside several thousand authors pledging to boycott Israeli cultural institutions.

== Personal life ==
In 2001, Lahiri married Alberto Vourvoulias-Bush, a Greek-Guatemalan American journalist who was then the deputy editor of TIME Latin America and is now its senior editor. In 2012, Lahiri moved to Rome from Brooklyn with her husband and their two children, Octavio (b. 2002) and Noor (b. 2005).

On July 1, 2015, Lahiri joined the Princeton University faculty as a professor of creative writing in the Lewis Center for the Arts. In 2022, she became the Millicent C. McIntosh Professor of English and Director of Creative Writing at her alma mater, Barnard College.

== Awards ==
- 1993 – TransAtlantic Award from the Henfield Foundation
- 1997 – Louisville Review Fiction Prize
- 1999 – O. Henry Award for short story "Interpreter of Maladies"
- 1999 – PEN/Hemingway Award (Best Fiction Debut of the Year) for "Interpreter of Maladies"
- 1999 – "Interpreter of Maladies" selected as one of Best American Short Stories
- 2000 – Addison Metcalf Award from the American Academy of Arts and Letters
- 2000 – "The Third and Final Continent" selected as one of Best American Short Stories
- 2000 – The New Yorker's Best Debut of the Year for "Interpreter of Maladies"
- 2000 – Pulitzer Prize for Fiction for her debut "Interpreter of Maladies"
- 2000 – James Beard Foundation's M.F.K. Fisher Distinguished Writing Award for "Indian Takeout" in Food & Wine Magazine
- 2002 – Guggenheim Fellowship
- 2002 – "Nobody's Business" selected as one of Best American Short Stories
- 2008 – Frank O'Connor International Short Story Award for "Unaccustomed Earth"
- 2009 – Asian American Literary Award for "Unaccustomed Earth"
- 2009 – Premio Gregor von Rezzori for foreign fiction translated into Italian for "Unaccustomed Earth" ("Una nuova terra"), translated by Federica Oddera (Guanda)
- 2014 – DSC Prize for South Asian Literature for The Lowland
- 2014 – National Humanities Medal
- 2017 – PEN/Malamud Award
- 2023 – Honorary Doctorate from The American University of Rome in recognition of her extraordinary contribution to literature in English and Italian.
- 2026 - St. Louis University Literary Award

== Published works ==
=== Novels ===
- The Namesake. Boston: Houghton Mifflin. 2003.
- The Lowland. New York: Knopf. 2013.
- Dove mi trovo (in Italian). Milan: Guanda. 2018. ISBN 978-88-235-2136-0.
  - Published in English as Whereabouts. New York: Knopf. 2021. ISBN 978-0-593-31831-7.

=== Short fiction ===
Collections

- Interpreter of Maladies (1999)
- Unaccustomed Earth (2008)
- Racconti romani (2022) / Roman Stories (2023)

Stories

| Title | Publication | Collected in |
|---|---|---|
| "A Real Durwan" | Harvard Review (Fall 1993) | Interpreter of Maladies |
| "Firoza and the Puzzle Maker" | New Letters 60.1 (1994) | - |
| "The Treatment of Bibi Haldar" | StoryQuarterly 30 (1994) | Interpreter of Maladies |
| "Barter" | American Literary Review 7.1 (Spring 1996) | - |
| "When Mr. Pirzada Came to Dine" | Louisville Review (Fall 1996-Spring 1997) | Interpreter of Maladies |
| "A Temporary Matter" | The New Yorker (April 20, 1998) | Interpreter of Maladies |
| "Sexy" | The New Yorker (December 28, 1998) | Interpreter of Maladies |
| "Interpreter of Maladies" | Agni 47 (1998) | Interpreter of Maladies |
| "This Blessed House" | Epoch 47.1 (1998) | Interpreter of Maladies |
| "Mrs. Sen's" | Salamander 6.1 (Summer 1999) | Interpreter of Maladies |
| "The Third and Final Continent" | The New Yorker (June 21, 1999) | Interpreter of Maladies |
| "Nobody's Business" | The New Yorker (March 12, 2001) | Unaccustomed Earth |
| "Gogol" | The New Yorker (June 16, 2003) | from The Namesake |
| "Hell-Heaven" | The New Yorker (May 24, 2004) | Unaccustomed Earth |
| "Once in a Lifetime" | The New Yorker (May 8, 2006) | Unaccustomed Earth |
| "Year's End" | The New Yorker (December 24, 2007) | Unaccustomed Earth |
| "Unaccustomed Earth" | Unaccustomed Earth (2008) | Unaccustomed Earth |
| "A Choice of Accommodations" | Unaccustomed Earth (2008) | Unaccustomed Earth |
| "Only Goodness" | Unaccustomed Earth (2008) | Unaccustomed Earth |
| "Going Ashore" | Unaccustomed Earth (2008) | Unaccustomed Earth |
| "Hema and Kaushik" | Unaccustomed Earth (2008) | Unaccustomed Earth |
| "Brotherly Love" | The New Yorker (June 10, 2013) | from The Lowland |
| "Il confine" ("The Boundary") | Granta Italia (2015); The New Yorker (January 29, 2018) | Racconti romani Roman Stories |
| "La riunione" ("The Reentry") | La Lettura (2018) | Racconti romani Roman Stories |
| "Le feste di P." ("P's Parties") | Nuovi Argomenti 4 (May 2019); The New Yorker (July 10, 2023) | Racconti romani Roman Stories |
| "Il ritiro" ("The Delivery") | Nuovi Argomenti 5 (September 2020); A Public Space 29 (January 2021) | Racconti romani Roman Stories |
| "Casting Shadows" | The New Yorker (February 15, 2021) | from Whereabouts |
| "Casa luminosa" ("Well-Lit House") | Nuovo Decameron (2021) | Racconti romani Roman Stories |
| "I biglettini" ("Notes") | Le ferite: quattordici grandi racconti per i 50 anni de Medici Senza Frontiere (2021) | Racconti romani Roman Stories |
| "La scalinata" ("The Steps") | Racconti romani (2022); Roman Stories (2023) | Racconti romani Roman Stories |
| "La processione" ("The Procession") | Racconti romani (2022); Roman Stories (2023) | Racconti romani Roman Stories |
| "Dante Alighieri" | Racconti romani (2022); Roman Stories (2023) | Racconti romani Roman Stories |
| "Jubilee" | The New Yorker (July 7 & 14, 2025) | - |

=== Poetry ===
Collections

- Il quaderno di Nerina (Italian) (2020)

=== Nonfiction ===
==== Books ====
- In altre parole (Italian) (2015) (English translation printed as In Other Words, 2016)
- Il vestito dei libri (Italian) (English translation as The Clothing of Books, 2016)
- Translating Myself and Others (2022)

==== Essays, reporting and other contributions ====
- The Magic Barrel (introduction) by Bernard Malamud, Farrar, Straus and Giroux, July 2003.
- "Cooking Lessons: The Long Way Home" (September 6, 2004, The New Yorker)
- Malgudi Days (introduction) by R. K. Narayan, Penguin Classics, 2006.
- "Rhode Island" in State by State edited by Matt Weiland and Sean Wilsey, Ecco, September 16, 2008
- "Improvisations: Rice" (November 23, 2009, The New Yorker)
- "Reflections: Notes from a Literary Apprenticeship" (June 13, 2011, The New Yorker)
- The Suspension of Time: Reflections on Simon Dinnerstein and The Fulbright Triptych edited by Daniel Slager, Milkweed Editions, June 14, 2011.
- "Teach yourself Italian". Personal History. The New Yorker. 91 (39). Translated from the Italian by Ann Goldstein: 30–36. December 7, 2015. (Note: Title in the online table of contents is "In translation".)

=== Translations ===
- Ties (2017), translation from Italian of Domenico Starnone's Lacci
- Trick (2018), translation from Italian of Domenico Starnone's Scherzetto
- Trust (2021), translation from Italian of Domenico Starnone's Confidenza
- Metamorphoses (2027), translation from Latin of Ovid's Metamorphoses with Yelena Baraz

———————

Bibliography notes

== See also ==
- Indians in the New York metropolitan area
- Lists of American writers
- List of Indian writers
