= Red Dress (Sarah Brand song) =

2021 song by Sarah Brand

Single by Sarah Brand
- Released: July 7, 2021
- Genre: Pop; outsider music
- Length: 3:14
- Songwriter: Sarah Brand

Sarah Brand singles chronology
"Fantasy" (2021)	"Red Dress" (2021)

"Red Dress" is a song recorded by American singer-songwriter Sarah Brand. The pop song, which was self-released by Brand on July 7, 2021, was written about exclusivity in religion. The song's music video went viral and attracted largely negative attention online due to Brand's off-key vocals. Critics and commenters surmised that the song was a social experiment after discovering that Brand was a sociology major at University of Oxford; Brand later said that the vocals being off-key was purposeful to reflect the message of the song.

== Background and composition ==
Sarah Brand was born in the Midwest and raised in Los Angeles. She attended University of California, Berkeley, where she sang at open mic nights. At the time of releasing "Red Dress", Brand was a 22-year-old University of Oxford graduate student pursuing a master's degree in sociology.

Brand released her debut single, "Fantasy", in June 2021. She wrote "Red Dress" one year before releasing it, while she was learning to play guitar. "Red Dress" is a pop song about judgmental churchgoers and exclusivity in religion. It was written by Brand and used session musicians. It features a "half-assed" guitar solo and off-key vocals from Brand, who stated that the song's vocals "don't seem to quite fit" and "make people uncomfortable". Critics have also referred to the song as outsider music. In November 2021, Brand released a follow-up single, "American Gap Rap", about economic inequality.

== Reception ==
After going viral online, "Red Dress" received largely negative reception online, with commenters on the song's music video criticizing the song as "agonizing". Critics and commenters suspected that the song was a social experiment after discovering that Brand was a sociology major at University of Oxford, while others pointed to her prior musical endeavors as evidence to the contrary. Critics and commenters also compared "Red Dress" to Rebecca Black's 2011 song "Friday" while noting similarities between "Red Dress" and Taylor Swift's 2015 song "Wildest Dreams". The A.V. Club's Reid McCarter described the song as "an avant-garde provocation" and "a dare that tests its listeners' endurance while also forcing them to question whether something so obviously horrible was made without Brand understanding what she was doing", writing that it "invites a kind of car wreck curiosity". Decider called Brand's vocals on the song "mediocre at best".

== Music video ==
The music video for "Red Dress" was directed, produced, choreographed, and edited by Brand, who described the video as a "cinematically holistic portrayal of judgement". Brand had created videos for University of California's sociology department and Intracom Systems prior to making the music video for "Red Dress". The song's video was filmed at St Michael at the North Gate over the course of six hours. Brand found extras for the video on Facebook and got COVID-19 tests for everyone on set prior to shooting. Two of Brand's friends worked as production assistants while Gordon Gronbach, a freelance videographer, shot the video. The video begins with Brand walking into a church in a white dress, and later shows Brand dancing seductively in a red dress in the pews and with a priest as the parishioners give her disgusted looks.

Amelia Tait of The Telegraph called the video "an impressive accomplishment when viewed as a one-(young wo)man production." Brand stated, "One of the main goals of this project was to prompt social introspection, and the music video has done just that." In 2022, she stated in a TikTok video that the vocals on the song were intentionally "out of key" to "incite judgement from the real world audience" in keeping with the song's theme of judgement.
