= Such a Long Journey (novel) =

1991 novel by Rohinton Mistry

- First edition
- Author: Rohinton Mistry
- Language: English
- Publisher: McClelland and Stewart
- Publication date: 1 April 1991
- Publication place: Canada, India
- Media type: Print (Paperback and Hardback)
- Pages: 424 pp (paperback first edition)
- ISBN: 0-7710-6058-0 (first edition, paperback)
- OCLC: 23652180
- Preceded by: Tales from Firozsha Bag
- Followed by: A Fine Balance

Such a Long Journey is a 1991 novel by Rohinton Mistry. It was shortlisted for the Booker Prize and won several other awards. In 2010 the book made headlines when it was withdrawn from the University of Mumbai's English syllabus after complaints by Maharashtrian politician Aditya Thackeray. It was adapted as a film of the same name.

== Plot introduction ==
Such a Long Journey takes place in Bombay (present-day Mumbai) in the year 1971. The novel's protagonist is a hard-working bank clerk called Gustad Noble, a member of the Parsi community and devoted family man struggling to keep his wife Dilnavaz, and three children out of poverty. His family begins to fall apart as his eldest son Sohrab refuses to attend the Indian Institute of Technology to which he has gained admittance and his youngest daughter, Roshan, falls ill. Other conflicts involve Gustad's ongoing interactions with his eccentric neighbours and his relationship with close friend and co-worker, Dinshawji. Tehmul, a seemingly unimportant and mentally disabled character, is essential in Gustad's life, as he brings out his tender side and represents the innocence of life. A letter that Gustad receives one day from an old friend, Major Bilimoria, slowly draws him into a government deception involving threats, secrecy and large amounts of money. The novel not only follows Gustad's life, but also India's political turmoil under the leadership of Indira Gandhi.

== Reception ==
When it was published in 1991, it won the Governor General's Award, the Commonwealth Writers Prize for Best Book, and the W.H. Smith/Books in Canada First Novel Award. It was shortlisted for the prestigious Booker Prize and for the Trillium Award. It has been translated into German, Swedish, Norwegian, Danish and Japanese, Korean and has been made into the 1998 film Such a Long Journey.

=== Withdrawal from Mumbai University's syllabus ===
When Aditya Thackeray, grandson of Bal Thackeray, then a final-year Arts student at St. Xavier's College, complained to the vice chancellor that the book contains abusive language about his grandfather and the Maharashtrian community, Such a Long Journey was withdrawn from the syllabus of Mumbai University.

The book was prescribed for the second year Bachelor of Arts (English) in 2007–08 as an optional text, according to University sources. It was also confirmed that Dr. Rajan Welukar, University of Mumbai's Vice-Chancellor (V-C) used the emergency powers under Section 14 (7) of the Maharashtra Universities Act, 1994, to withdraw the book from the syllabus. Based on a complaint, the Board of Studies (English), which had recommended the book earlier, resolved that it must be withdrawn with effect from September 15.

Following this incident the book entered public debate. The teachers' union wanted the Vice Chancellor to defend academic freedom, claiming that the book was selected for literary reasons. Their point of view was that the author, Rohinton Mistry, did not think poorly of Marathi-speakers, and that the passages were perspectives of a character in the book. The Chief Minister of Maharashtra Ashok Chavan (Member of Congress Party) stated that the book was "highly abusive and objectionable". Former Vice-Chancellor of Mumbai University and Member of the Planning Commission of India Bhalchandra Mungekar stated: "I'm fully convinced, even giving the benefit of the doubt to the book being a piece of fiction, that some sentences are certainly objectionable...there is a difference between dissenting with the political and social philosophy of an individual or organisation, and abusing the individual by name". Faculty have complained of pressure tactics being used to coerce their support of the vice chancellor's decision. The book is unlikely to be reintroduced in the short term on account of possibility of law and order problems. Mistry has also expressed disappointment in a statement regarding the withdrawal.

== Characters ==
=== Noble family ===
- Gustad Noble

Gustad is an ethnically Parsi, placid and very religious person in his 50s, and works at a bank. He recites kusti prayers every morning. He has three children, two sons and a daughter. Gustad is also a loving and indulging father, and is eager for his eldest son to become accomplished when he grows up.

- Dilnavaz Noble is married to Gustad Noble and does many remedies to restore peace in the home
- Sohrab Noble has refused to attend the Indian institute of Technology
- Darius Noble is in love with the neighbour's daughter
- Roshan Noble always falls ill with an intestinal disease

=== Gustad's close friends ===
- Major Jimmy "Billiboy" Billimoria involves in Research and Analysis Wing
- Dinshawji is known for his constant sense of humour
- Malcom Saldanha

=== Khodadad Building residents ===
- Miss Kutpitia - a practitioner of various healing and cursing superstitions.
- Tehmul "Lungraa"
- Mr. Rabadi (the "Dogwalla idiot")
- Inspector Bamji
- Mrs. Pastakia
- Mr. Pastakia (depressed father-in-law of Mrs. Pastakia)

=== Other characters ===
- Ghulam Mohammed (Major Billimoria's accomplice), a taxi driver
- Dr. Paymaster
- Sidewalk Artist (paints the black wall)
- Laurie Coutino (secretary of Parsi Bank, teased by Dinshawji as "Lorrie", Parsi slang for penis)
- Mr. Madon (Manager of Parsi Bank)
- Peerbhoy Paanwalla
- Alamai "Domestic Vulture" (Dinshawji's wife, and later widow)
- Nusli (Dinshawji's nephew and adopted son)

– Indira Gandhi (prime minister)

== Release details ==
- Such a Long Journey, Toronto: McClelland and Stewart (1991) ISBN 0-7710-6058-0
- Such a Long Journey, London: Faber (1991) ISBN 0-571-16147-2
- Such a Long Journey, New York: Knopf (1991) ISBN 0-679-40258-6
- Such a Long Journey, London: Faber (1992) ISBN 0-571-16525-7
- Such a Long Journey, New York: Vintage (1992) ISBN 0-679-73871-1
- Such a Long Journey, Toronto: McClelland and Stewart (1997) ISBN 0-7710-6057-2
- Such a Long Journey, Toronto: McClelland and Stewart (1999) ISBN 0-7710-6104-8
