= Rohinton Mistry =

Indian-born Canadian writer

Rohinton Mistry CM
- Born: 1952 (age 73–74); Bombay, Bombay State, India (now Mumbai, Maharashtra)
- Education: St. Xavier's College, Bombay; University of Toronto
- Occupations: Novelist; short story writer
- Spouse: Freny Elavia
- Relatives: Cyrus Mistry (brother)
- Writing career
- Notable works: Tales from Firozsha Baag; Such a Long Journey; A Fine Balance; Family Matters
- Notable awards: Governor General's Award for English-language fiction (1991); Giller Prize (1995); Neustadt International Prize for Literature (2012)

Rohinton Mistry (born 1952) is an Indian-born Canadian writer. He has been the recipient of the Neustadt International Prize for Literature in 2012. Each of his three novels was shortlisted for the Booker Prize. All have been set in India, told from the perspective of Parsis, and explore themes of family life, poverty, discrimination, and the corrupting influence of society.

== Early life and education ==
Rohinton Mistry was born in to a Parsi family from present-day Mumbai, Maharashtra, India. His brother is the playwright and author Cyrus Mistry. He earned a BA in Mathematics and Economics from St. Xavier's College, Bombay.

He emigrated to Canada with his wife-to-be Freny Elavia in 1975 and they married shortly afterwards. He worked in a bank for a while, before returning to academia at the University of Toronto where he obtained a BA in English and Philosophy.

== Career ==
While attending the University of Toronto (Woodsworth College) he became the first to win two Hart House literary prizes for stories published in the Hart House Review, and Canadian Fiction Magazine's annual Contributor's Prize for 1985.

Three years later, Penguin Books Canada published his collection of 11 short stories, Tales from Firozsha Baag. It was later published in the United States as Swimming Lessons and Other Stories from Firozsha Baag. The book consists of 11 stories set within an apartment complex in modern-day Bombay. This volume contains the oft-anthologized story, "Swimming Lessons".

His second book, the novel Such a Long Journey, was published in 1991. It has been translated into German, Swedish, Norwegian, Danish and Japanese. It was adapted for the 1998 film Such a Long Journey. The content of the book caused controversy at Mumbai University in 2010 due to language used against Bal Thackeray, leader of Shiv Sena, a political party from Maharashtra, as well as some remarks about Maharashtrians. The book was prescribed for the second year Bachelor of Arts (English) in 2007–08 as an optional text, according to University sources. Later, Dr. Rajan Welukar, University of Mumbai's Vice-Chancellor (V-C) used emergency powers in the Maharashtra Universities Act, 1994, to withdraw the book from the syllabus.

Family Matters (2002) is a consideration of the difficulties that come with ageing, to which topic Mistry returned in 2006 with the short fiction The Scream (published as a separate volume, in support of World Literacy of Canada, with illustrations by Tony Urquhart). Mistry's literary papers are housed at the Clara Thomas Archives at York University.

In 2002, Mistry cancelled his United States book tour for his novel Family Matters after he and his wife were targeted by security agents at every airport.

== Awards and honours ==
=== Literary awards ===
- 1983 and 1984 – Hart House Literary Contest, first prize for "One Sunday" and "Auspicious Occasion", respectively.
- 1985 – Annual Contributor's Prize from Canadian Fiction Magazine.
- 1991 – Governor General's Award for English-language fiction for Such a Long Journey.
- 1992 – Commonwealth Writers' Prize for Best Book and the SmithBooks/Books in Canada First Novel Award for Such a Long Journey.
- 1995 – Giller Prize for A Fine Balance.
- 1996 – Commonwealth Writers' Prize for Best Book, Los Angeles Times Book Prize for Fiction, and Winifred Holtby Memorial Prize for A Fine Balance.
- 2002 – Kiriyama Prize for Family Matters, shared with Pascal Khoo Thwe.
- 2003 – Canadian Authors Association Award for Fiction for Family Matters.
- 2005 – Timothy Findley Award from the Writers' Trust of Canada.
- 2012 – Neustadt International Prize for Literature.
- Denmark's ALOA Prize for A Fine Balance.

=== Shortlists ===
- 1991 – Booker Prize and Trillium Book Award for Such a Long Journey.
- 1996 – Booker Prize for A Fine Balance.
- 1997 – International Dublin Literary Award for A Fine Balance.
- 2002 – Booker Prize and James Tait Black Memorial Prize for Family Matters.
- 2004 – International Dublin Literary Award for Family Matters.
- 2011 – Man Booker International Prize.
- The Irish Times International Fiction Prize and Prix Femina étranger for A Fine Balance.

=== Fellowships and honours ===
- 2004 – Trudeau Fellows Prize.
- 2005 – Guggenheim Fellowship.
- 2010 – Elected a Fellow of the Royal Society of Literature.
- 2014 – Inducted into the Brampton Arts Walk of Fame.
- 2015 – Appointed a Member of the Order of Canada (CM), with investiture in 2016.

== Selected works ==
=== Novels ===
- Such a Long Journey (1991)
- A Fine Balance (1995)
- Family Matters (2002)

=== Short stories and chapbooks ===
- Tales from Firozsha Baag (1987), also published as Swimming Lessons and Other Stories from Firozsha Baag (1989)
- Searching for Stevenson (1994)
- The Scream (2006)

== See also ==
- List of Canadian writers
- List of Indian writers
