= A Fine Balance =

1995 novel by Rohinton Mistry

- First edition
- Author: Rohinton Mistry
- Cover artist: Dario Mitidieri
- Language: English
- Genre: Historical novel
- Published: 1995 (McClelland and Stewart)
- Publication place: Canada
- Media type: Print (Paperback)
- ISBN: 0-679-44608-7
- OCLC: 33819149
- Dewey Decimal: 813/.54 20
- LC Class: PR9199.3.M494 F56 1996

A Fine Balance is the second novel by Rohinton Mistry, published by McClelland and Stewart in 1995. Set in "an unidentified city" in India, initially in 1975 and later in 1984 during the turmoil of The Emergency, the book focuses on four characters from varied backgrounds – Dina Dalal, Ishvar Darji, his nephew Omprakash Darji, and the young student Maneck Kohlah – who come together and develop a bond.

The novel won the 1995 Giller Prize. It was shortlisted for the Booker Prize in 1996. It was one of the only two Canadian books selected for Oprah's Book Club, and was one of the selected books in the 2002 edition of Canada Reads, championed by actress Megan Follows. In 2014, A Fine Balance was ranked in The Telegraph as one of the 10 all-time greatest Asian novels. Emma-Lee Potter of The Independent listed it as the book with the strongest prose and character development out of 12 Indian novels "that everyone needs to read."

An acclaimed stage adaptation of the novel by the Tamasha Theatre Company was produced at the Hampstead Theatre in London in 2006 and later revived in 2007.

== Reception ==
Brooke Allen, writing for The Atlantic in 2002, noted that this was the first book by Mistry that went out of his familiar circle of Parsi characters and aimed at describing the whole of Indian society. Whereas the main characters suffer a lot in the book, and all of them in the end lose, throughout the book they continue laughing, and the book is not perceived as tragic. She also mentions that Mistry's use of big metaphors makes the novel reminiscent of great 19th-century authors.

On the other hand, Shankar Vedantam, writing in 1996 for the Chicago Tribune, while praising Mistry's storytelling and love for detail, criticized his broad vision of the Indian society as too negative and complained that Mistry shows too much despair in the novel.

== Plot summary ==
The book exposes the changes in Indian society from independence in 1947 to the Emergency declared by Indian Prime Minister Indira Gandhi. Mistry was generally critical of Indira Gandhi in the book. She, however, is never referred to by name by any of the characters, and is instead called simply "the Prime Minister". The characters, from diverse backgrounds, are brought together by economic forces changing India.

=== Prologue: Ishvar and Om's story ===
Ishvar and Omprakash's family is part of the Chamaar caste, who traditionally cured leather and were considered untouchable. In an attempt to break away from the restrictive caste system, Ishvar's father apprentices his sons Ishvar and Narayan to a Muslim tailor, Ashraf Chacha, in a nearby town, and so they became tailors.

A powerful upper-caste village thug, Thakur Dharamsi, has his henchmen murder Narayan and his family for having the temerity to ask for a ballot. Ishvar and Narayan's son Omprakash (Om) are the only two who escape the killing as they lodged with Ashraf in the nearby town. As a result of their skills, Ishvar and Om later move to the big city to get work, by then unavailable in the town near their village because a pre-made clothing shop has opened.

At the beginning of the book, the two tailors, Ishvar and Omprakash, are on their way to the flat of widow Dina Dalal via a train. While on the train, they meet a college student named Maneck Kohlah, who coincidentally is also on his way to the flat of Dina Dalal to be a boarder. Maneck, from a small mountain village in northern India, moves to the city to acquire a college certificate "as a back-up" in case his father's soft drink business is no longer able to compete after the building of a highway near their village. Maneck and the two tailors become friends and go to Dina's flat together. Dina hires Ishvar and Om for piecework, and is happy to let Maneck stay with her.

Dina, from a traditionally wealthy Parsi family, maintains tenuous independence from her brother by living in the flat of her deceased husband, who was a student.

=== Dina's Story ===
Dina grew up in a wealthy family. Her father was a medical doctor who died when she was twelve. Her mother was withdrawn and unable to take care of Dina after her father's death, so the job fell to Nusswan, Dina's elder brother. Nusswan was rather abusive to Dina, forcing her to do all the cooking, cleaning, and drop out of school, and hitting her when she went against his wishes. Dina rebelled against Nusswan and his prospective suitors for her when she came of age, and found her own husband, Rustom Dalal, a chemist, at a concert hall. Nusswan and his wife Ruby were happy to let her marry Rustom and move to his flat.

Dina and Rustom lived happily for three years until Rustom died on their third wedding anniversary, after being hit by a truck while on his bicycle. Dina became a tailor under the guidance of Rustom's surrogate parents to avoid having to move in with Nusswan. After twenty years her eyesight gave out from complicated embroidery and she was once again jobless. She eventually met a lady from a company called Au Revoir Exports - Mrs Gupta - who would buy ready-made dresses in patterns. She agrees to let Dina sew the patterns. But since Dina has very poor eyesight, she decides to hire tailors. She also decides to have a paying guest to generate more income for her rent.

The tailors rent their own sewing machines, and come to Dina's flat each day for nearly two weeks before the first round of dresses is completed. The three get along fairly well, but Dina and Omprakash do not see eye to eye all the time. Omprakash is angry that Dina is a middle-person; he wants to sew for Au Revoir directly.

=== Maneck's story ===
Maneck was born in a mountain town in the Kashmir Valley to loving parents, Mr and Mrs Kohlah. Maneck is drawn to the natural scenery of his homeland, straddled between the Himalayas. His father owned a grocery store that had been in the family for generations. The store sold household necessities and manufactured the locally popular soda, Kohlah Cola. Maneck spent his days going to school, helping at the store, and going on walks with his father. When he was in the fourth standard, Maneck was sent to boarding school to help his education, much to his dismay. After this, his relationship with his parents deteriorates because he does not wish to be separated from them and feels betrayed. His parents send him to a college and choose his major, refrigeration and air-conditioning.

Maneck goes to college and stays at the student hostel. Maneck becomes friends with his neighbor, Avinash, who is also the student president and who teaches him how to get rid of vermin in his room. Avinash also teaches Maneck chess and they play together often. Avinash later becomes involved in political events, for which Maneck has little interest, and their friendship is no longer a priority for Avinash. They start seeing each other quite infrequently. But when the Emergency is declared in India, political activists had to go into hiding in order to be safe, Avinash included. Maneck, after a humiliating ragging session by fellow hostel students, has his mother arrange a different living situation for him, and he moves in with Dina Dalal.

=== Effects of the Emergency ===
Dina and the tailors' business runs fairly smoothly for almost a year, but effects of the Emergency bother them often. The shantytown where the tailors live is knocked down in a government "beautification" program, and the residents are uncompensated and forced to move into the streets. Later Ishvar and Om are rounded up by a police beggar raid and are sold to a labor camp. After two months in the camp, they bribe their way out with the help of the Beggarmaster, a kind of pimp for beggars. Ishvar and Om are lucky and Dina decides to let them stay with her. The tailors and Dina find trouble from the landlord, because she is not supposed to be running a business from her flat. She pretends that Ishvar is her husband and Om their son; after this does not help she gets protection from the Beggarmaster.

Ishvar and Om return to their village to find a wife for Omprakash, who is now eighteen. Maneck returns home, finished with his first year in college (he has received a certificate but not a degree), but has stiff relations with his family and finds that his father's business is failing due to the invasion of cheap commercial sodas. He takes a lucrative job in Middle Eastern Dubai to escape the conditions.

Dina being alone now, and her protector the Beggarmaster having been murdered, has no protection from the landlord who wants to break her apartment's rent control and charge more rent, so she is evicted. Dina is forced to move back to her brother Nusswan's house.

Omprakash and Ishvar return to their old town to find that Ashraf Chacha is an elderly man whose wife died and daughters were all married off. He gives them a place to stay while they search for marriage prospects for Om. While they walk around the village, they run into the upper-caste Thakur Dharamsi. Omprakash recognizes him and spits in his direction. Thakur in turn recognizes Om, and decides to somehow pay Om back for his disrespect of an upper caste member. When Ashraf Chacha, Ishvar, and Om are in the village, they run into herders from the Family Planning Centre. As the Centre in this city did not fill its quota, they take random people from the street and force them into a truck that drives them to the Family Planning Centre. All three are beaten into the truck and since Ashraf Chacha is so old, he is gravely injured and later dies on the street. Ishvar and Omprakash beg to escape the forced sterilization, but the vasectomy takes place. As they lie in an outside tent recovering, Thakur Dharamsi comes by and orders the doctor to give Om a castration. Ishvar's legs become infected due to the use of unsterilized surgical equipment used for the vasectomy and must be amputated. However, Ishvar and Om have nowhere to go now that Ashraf Chacha has died. His son-in-law sells his house and they are forced to leave town.

=== Epilogue: 1984 ===
Eight years later, Maneck returns home for the second time from Dubai for his father's funeral. Maneck is repulsed by the violence that follows after the Prime Minister's assassination, for which Sikhs are killed. He returns home and attends the funeral, but cannot bring himself to truly miss his father, only the father of his young childhood.

While at home he reads old newspapers and learns that Avinash's three sisters have hanged themselves, unable to bear their parents' humiliation at not being able to provide dowries for their marriages. Shocked and shaken, he decides to visit Dina in Bombay for better news. He learns from Dina the horrific lives that Ishvar and Om – one disabled and the other castrated – have led as beggars after their village visit. As Maneck leaves, he encounters Om and Ishvar on the street. The two former tailors are nearly unrecognizable because of their filth, and don't appear to recall him. They try to attract his attention, but he doesn't know what to say and walks on.

Maneck goes to the train station, his world shattered. He walks out on the tracks as an express train approaches the station and commits suicide by letting the train run over him.

It turns out that Om and Ishvar were on their way to visit Dina. They are still friends, and she gives them meals and money when the house is empty. Dina and the beggars discuss their lives and how Maneck has changed from a pleasant and friendly college student to a distant refrigeration specialist. Om and Ishvar leave, promising to visit after the weekend. Dina washes up their plates, and returns the plates to the cupboard, where they are to be used later by Nusswan and Ruby.

== Characters ==
- Dina Shroff (later, Dina Dalal when married to Rustom Dalal)
- Ishvar Darji
- Omprakash "Om" Darji (Ishvar's nephew)
- Maneck Kohlah
- Nusswan Shroff (Dina's brother)
- Zenobia (Dina's friend)
- Mrs. Gupta (Zenobia's Client/Dina's boss)
- Vasantrao Valmik (the proofreader and lawyer)
- Ibrahim (the rent collector)
- Dukhi Mochi (father of Ishvar and Narayan)
- Thakur Dharamsi (killed Om's father and is later in charge of the Family Planning and holds political office)
- Ashraf Chacha (Dukhi's friend. A tailor)
- Nawaz (Ashraf's friend)
- Rajaram (initially, a hair collector and later, Bal Baba)
- Monkey-man (a resident of the slum who kills Beggarmaster)
- Aban Kohlah (Maneck's mother)
- Farokh Kohlah (Maneck's father)
- Avinash (Maneck's good friend that mysteriously disappears, President of the Student Union and Chairman of the Hostel Committee)
- Sergeant Kesar
- Shankar (the crippled beggar) also known as Worm who rolls on the ground
- Beggarmaster (Step or Half Brother of Shankar) and who controls all the beggars
- Shanti (a girl in the slum)
- Jeevan (Tailor who was with Om and Ishvar in their first assignment)
- Ruby Shroff (Nusswan's wife)
- Rustom Dalal (Dina's deceased husband)
- Shirin Aunty (Rustom's aunt)
- Darab Uncle (Rustom's uncle)
- Mr Toddywalla (chatty man at the music recitals)
- Fredoon (Dina's male friend)
- Xerxes and Zarir (Ruby and Nusswan's children)
- Narayan Darji (Ishvar's brother, and Om's father) Ordered flogged, burned and hanged by Thakur Dharamsi because he (along with two other men) demanded they be given a ballot.
- Kim (lazy child)
- Pandit Lalluram (a Brahmin)
- Nosey (Mother of Shankar and "Stepmother" of Beggarmaster)
- Suraiya (Childhood friend of Maneck)
