= Amiruddin Shah =

Indian ballet dancer

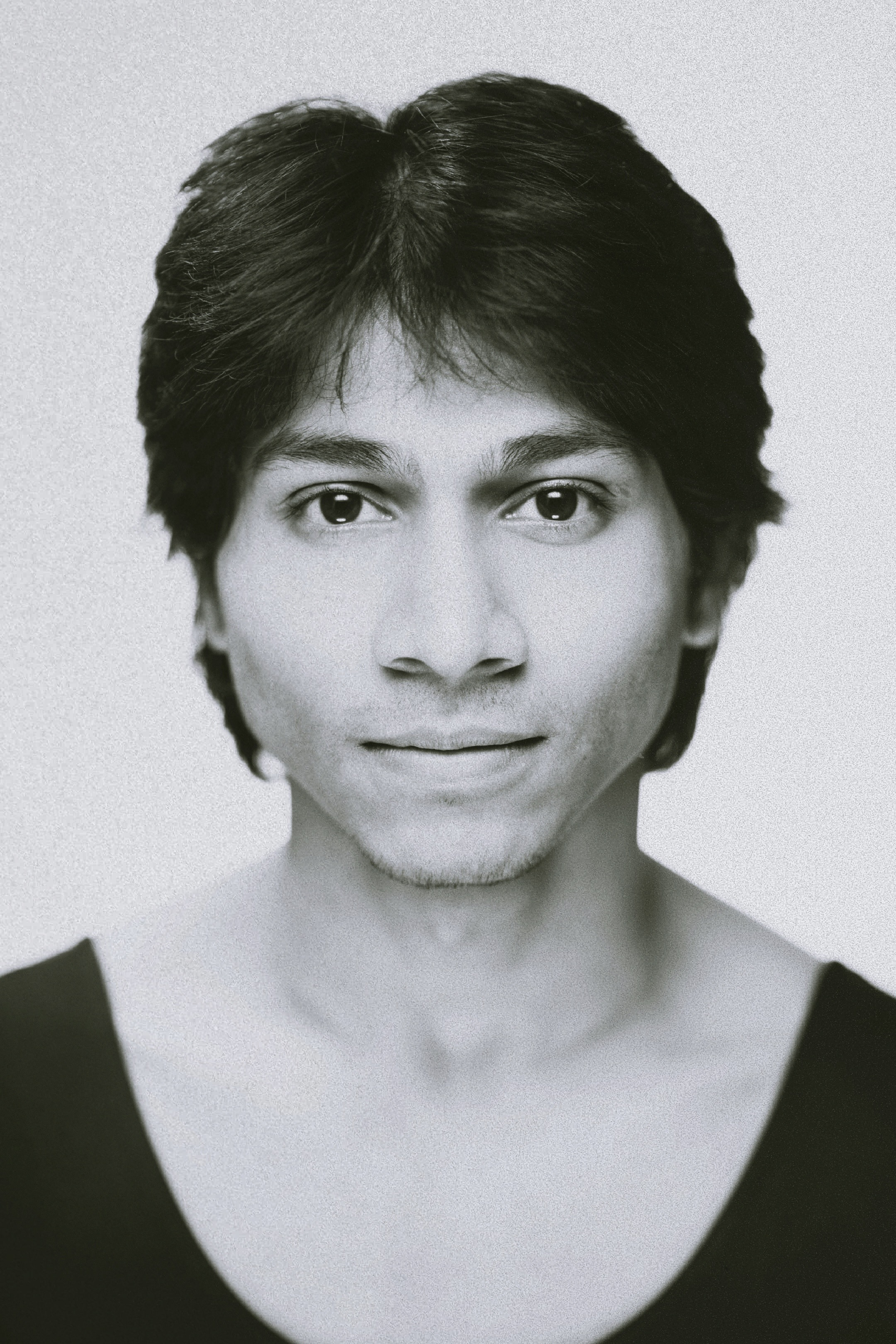
- Photography by Amber Hunt
- Education: Royal Ballet School, Oregon Ballet Theatre
- Alma mater: University of Roehampton London University of Cambridge
- Occupations: Ballet dancer; actor; writer; director
- Employer: Miami City Ballet
- Organization(s): TAD Pictures Releasing, short for "THEARTDOOR"
- Known for: India's 'Billy Elliot'
- Notable work: North American Premiere of Swan Lake The Royal Ballet’s: Elite Syncopations.
- Awards: Lynn Seymour Award for Expressive Dance
- Website: https://www.instagram.com/amiruddinshah_official/

Amiruddin Shah is the first truly classical male ballet dancer from India. He has been compared to the protagonist of "Billy Elliot" by the BBC World Service. He became the first Indian ballet dancer to dance with a major company, Miami City Ballet. in Miami he worked with superstar ballet choreographer Alexei Ratmansky, in the North American premiere of Swan Lake. Shah currently has two upcoming fantasy dance films The Red Dress and A Stranger in New York and Balanchine's Protege: John Clifford, a feature-length documentary film.

== The Royal Ballet School ==
Shah was the first and only native born Indian dancer to train and graduate from the world-renowned Royal Ballet School in London.

== Lynn Seymour Award ==
Shah was awarded the Lynn Seymour Award in 2019.

== Netflix original film "Yeh Ballet" ==
Additionally, Shah's life story has inspired a Netflix original movie "Yeh Ballet," which showcases his journey and influence. Amiruddin Shah's accomplishments and dedication to his craft serve as an inspiration to aspiring dancers and artists worldwide. Although he did not appear in the film, Shah's influence on its creation is significant.

== The Royal Opera House ==
Shah has performed as a leading soloist in the Royal Ballet's "Elite Syncopations" at the Royal Opera House Covent Garden.

== Filmography ==
Year	Film	Director	Writer	Producer	Actor	Company	Credit	Notes	Award	Won
2016	Tea Time	No	No	No	Yes	Viacome18 Motion Pictures / Viacome18 Studios	Distributor	Lead Actor	Cineshorts Season - 1	Yes
2023	A Stranger in New York	Yes	Yes	Yes	Yes	TAD Pictures Releasing and RUMUR Films	Production company/distributor	In association with All Street Production.		
2024	The Red Dress	Yes	Yes	Yes	Yes	TAD Pictures Releasing in association with RUMUR Films	Production company/distributor			
2025	Balanchine's Protege: John Clifford	Yes	Yes	Yes	Yes	TAD Pictures Releasing in association with Trashy Studios	Production company/distributor	Documentary film		
