= Interpreter of Maladies =

1999 book by Jhumpa Lahiri

- Cover of paperback edition
- Author: Jhumpa Lahiri
- Language: English
- Genre: Short stories
- Publisher: Houghton Mifflin
- Publication date: 1999
- Publication place: United States
- Media type: Print (hardback & paperback) Ebook
- Pages: 198 pp
- ISBN: 0-618-10136-5
- OCLC: 40331288
- Followed by: The Namesake

Interpreter of Maladies is a collection of nine short stories by Indian-American author Jhumpa Lahiri, published in 1999. It won the Pulitzer Prize for Fiction and the Hemingway Foundation/PEN Award in the year 2000 and has sold over 15 million copies worldwide. It was also chosen as The New Yorker's Best Debut of the Year and is on Oprah Winfrey's Top Ten Book List. The stories follow Indians and Indian Americans caught between their roots and the "New World".

== Contents ==
Story	Originally published in
"A Temporary Matter"	The New Yorker
"When Mr. Pirzada Came to Dine"	The Louisville Review
"Interpreter of Maladies"	Agni Review
"A Real Durwan"	Harvard Review
"Sexy"	The New Yorker
"Mrs. Sen's"	Salamander
"This Blessed House"	Epoch
"The Treatment of Bibi Haldar"	Story Quarterly
"The Third and Final Continent"	The New Yorker

== Plot summary ==
=== A Temporary Matter ===
A married couple, Shukumar and Shoba, live as strangers in their house until an electrical outage brings them together when, all of a sudden, "they [are] able to talk to each other again" over four nights of darkness. From Shukumar's point of view, the reader gets bits and pieces of memory that slowly reveal what has caused the distance in the marriage. For a brief moment, it seems the distance is simply the result of a disagreement. However, descriptions of Shukumar and Shoba's changed physical appearances hint at something far deeper than a lovers’ quarrel. The reader soon learns that both characters’ worn outward appearance stems from internal emotional strife that has created a deep alienation between them.

The husband and wife mourn their stillborn baby. This traumatic loss casts melancholic tone over the rest of the story. However, the couple find hope in reconnecting, as each night in the dark, they confess more and more to each other—things they never said as man and woman. A late-night drink with a friend, a ripped-out photo from a magazine, and anguish over a sweater vest are all confessions made in the nightly blackouts. Shukumar and Shoba grow closer as their secrets combine into a knowledge that seems like the remedy for the enormous loss they share. On the fourth night, the reader hopes for their reconnection when they "make love with a desperation they had forgotten."

But just as being stillborn means never having begun life, so too does the couple's effort to rekindle their marriage fail at the outset. Shobha gives one last confession first, then Shukumar gives another at the end of "A Temporary Matter". In full confidence with one another, they acknowledge the finality of losing their marriage. Finally, "[t]hey weep for the things they now knew."

=== When Mr. Pirzada Came to Dine ===
Mr. Pirzada is a botany professor from Dhaka living in New England for the year after receiving a research grant from the Pakistani Government; he has left behind his wife and seven daughters, whom he has not contacted in months. Because his grant does not provide him much for daily provisions, he routinely visits ten-year-old Lilia and her family for dinner, often bringing confectionery for the young girl. When Lilia mistakenly calls Mr. Pirzada "Indian" to her parents in private, her father tells her he is Pakistani, which puzzles Lilia because he looks like her parents, eats the same things, and speaks Bengali like them. However, constant television news of the East Pakistan-West Pakistan War informs her about Mr. Pirzada's differences and his current plight. Because of this, she decides one night to eat the candy he gives her, pray, and forget to brush her teeth so the candy's magic through prayer remains. She also tries to learn as much as possible about Pakistan from her school library. Her curiosity is stunted by her teacher telling her there is "no reason to consult" the book on Pakistan.

During late October, her mother buys a large pumpkin, which Lilia insists she carves. Mr. Pirzada offers his help and ends up doing most of the cutting. When news of a potential war between India and West Pakistan over East Pakistan is reported, the knife slips from Mr. Pirzada's hand and forms an "O" as the jack-o'-lantern's mouth. During Halloween, when Lilia and her friend Dora go trick-or-treating dressed as witches, Mr. Pirzada insists on accompanying them for safety; Lilia responds, "don't worry", and soon realizes the irony of her statement. Mr. Pirzada responds, "if the lady insists" and stays with Lilia's parents for the night.

During Lilia and Dora's stroll around the neighborhood, Dora asks why Mr. Pirzada wanted to accompany them so direly. Lilia remarks that "his daughters are missing," which makes her feel guilty. Lilia then tries to justify to Dora that she misspoke earlier and that Mr. Pirzada's daughters are actually fine. That night, upon returning home, she learns of the imminent India-Pakistan War, and when it occurs in December, their home is deprived of joy. After the new year, Mr. Pirzada returns home to a new nation, Bangladesh. Soon after, when he sends pictures of himself and all his daughters, Lilia and her family are relieved. Lilia reveals that she has been eating a piece of Halloween candy and praying for him every day, but when she received the good news, she stopped doing so and eventually decided to throw away the candy.

=== Interpreter of Maladies ===
Mr. and Mrs. Das, Indian Americans visiting the country of their heritage, hire a middle-aged tour guide, Mr. Kapasi, as their driver for the day as they tour the Konark Sun Temple. Mr. Kapasi notes the parents’ immaturity. Mr. and Mrs. Das look and act young to the point of childishness, go by their first names when talking to their children, Ronny, Bobby, and Tina, and seem selfishly indifferent to the kids. On their trip, when her husband and children get out of the car to sightsee, Mrs. Das sits in the car, eating snacks she offers to no one else, wearing her sunglasses as a barrier, and painting her nails. When Tina asks her to paint her nails as well, Mrs. Das turns away and rebuffs her daughter.

Mr. and Mrs. Das ask the good-natured Mr. Kapasi about his job as a tour guide, and he tells them about his weekday job as an interpreter in a doctor's office. Mr. Kapasi's wife resents her husband's job because he works at the doctor's clinic that previously failed to cure their son of typhoid fever. She belittles his job, and he, too, discounts the importance of his occupation as a waste of his linguistic skills. However, Mrs. Das deems it “romantic” and a big responsibility, pointing out that the health of the patients depends upon Mr. Kapasi's correct interpretation of their maladies.

Mr. Kapasi begins to develop a romantic interest in Mrs. Das and conducts a private conversation with her during the trip. Mr. Kapasi imagines a future correspondence with Mrs. Das, picturing them building a relationship to translate the transcontinental gap between them. However, Mrs. Das reveals a secret: she tells Mr. Kapasi the story of an affair she once had, and that her son Bobby had been born out of her adultery. She explains that she chose to tell Mr. Kapasi because of his profession; she hopes he can interpret her feelings and make her feel better as he does for his patients, translating without passing judgment. However, when Mr. Kapasi reveals his disappointment in her and points out her guilt, Mrs. Das storms off.

As Mrs. Das walks away toward her family, she leaves a trail of puffed rice crumbs, and monkeys begin to trail her. The neglectful Das parents don't notice as the monkeys, following Mrs. Das's food trail, surround their son, Bobby, isolating the son born of a different father. The monkeys begin to attack Bobby, and Mr. Kapasi rushes in to save him. Mr. Kapasi returns Bobby to his parents and looks on as they clean up their son.

=== A Real Durwan ===
Boori Ma is a feeble 64-year-old woman deported to Calcutta who is the stairsweeper, or durwan, of an old brick building. In exchange for her services, the residents allow Boori Ma to sleep in front of the collapsible gates leading into the tenement. While sweeping, she narrates stories of her past: her daughter's extravagant wedding, her servants, her estate and her riches. The residents of the brick building hear Boori's contradictions, but her stories are seductive and compelling, so they let them pass. One family in particular takes a liking to Boori Ma, the Dalals. Mrs. Dalal often gives Boori Ma food and takes care of her ailments. When Mr. Dalal gets promoted at work, he improves the brick building by installing a sink in the stairwell and a sink in his home. The Dalals continue to improve their home and even go on a ten-day trip to Simla, promising to bring Boori Ma a sheep's-hair blanket. While the Dalals are away, other residents become obsessed with improving the building themselves. Boori Ma even spends her life savings on special treats while circling around the neighborhood. However, one afternoon while Boori Ma is out, the sink in the stairwell is stolen. The residents accuse Boori Ma of informing the robbers and of negligence in her job. When Boori Ma protests, the residents continue to accuse her because of all her previous inconsistent stories. Finally, the residents throw out Boori Ma's belongings and begin searching for a 'real durwan'. Note that 'durwan' means doorkeeper in Hindustani and Farsi.

=== Sexy ===
“Sexy” centers on Miranda, a young white woman who has an affair with a married Indian man named Dev. Although one of Miranda's work friends is an Indian woman named Laxmi, Miranda knows very little about India and its culture. The first time she meets Dev, she can't tell his ethnicity. However, she is instantly captivated by his charm and the thrill of being with an exotic, older man. Dev takes Miranda to the Mapparium, where he whispers, "You're sexy." Miranda buys clothes that she thinks are suitable for a mistress, but feels pangs of guilt because Dev is married. Meanwhile, Laxmi's cousin has been abandoned by her husband, who left the cousin for a younger woman. One day, Laxmi's cousin comes to Boston and Miranda is asked to babysit the cousin's seven-year-old son, Rohin. Rohin asks Miranda to try on the clothes she bought, giving Miranda insight into his mother's grief. Miranda decides that she and Dev's wife both "deserve better," and stops seeing Dev.

=== Mrs. Sen's ===
In this story, 11-year-old Eliot begins staying with Mrs. Sen—a university professor's wife—after school. Mrs. Sen was hired by Elliot's mother to babysit her son while she is at work. While watching the boy, Mrs. Sen chops and prepares food as she tells Eliot stories of her past life in Calcutta, helping to craft her identity. Like "A Temporary Matter," this story is filled with lists of produce, catalogs of ingredients, and descriptions of recipes. Emphasis is placed on ingredients and the act of preparation. Other objects are emphasized as well, such as Mrs. Sen's colorful collection of saris from her native India. Much of the plot revolves around Mrs. Sen's tradition of purchasing fish from a local seafood market. This fish reminds Mrs. Sen of her home and holds great significance for her. However, reaching the seafood market requires driving, a skill that Mrs. Sen has not learned and resists learning. At the end of the story, Mrs. Sen attempts to drive to the market without her husband, and ends up in an automobile accident. Eliot soon stops staying with Mrs. Sen thereafter and becomes a latchkey child.

=== This Blessed House ===
Sanjeev and Twinkle, a newly married couple, are exploring their new house in Hartford, Connecticut, which appears to have been owned by fervent Christians. As they go about investigating and fixing up the house, they begin to find small Christian knickknacks, left behind by the previous owners. Twinkle first finds a porcelain effigy of Christ. Sanjeev does not like it and tells Twinkle to get rid of it, but she thinks it is pretty and might even be worth something. Sanjeev reminds her that they are not Christians. No, she confirms, they are Hindus. She puts the statue of Christ on the fireplace mantel. The story ends when, during a party, Twinkle and the guests explore the house. Upon searching the attic, they find a solid silver bust of Christ. Meanwhile, Sanjeev, who stayed downstairs, alone, contemplates his situation and relationship with Twinkle.

=== The Treatment of Bibi Haldar ===
29-year-old Bibi Haldar is gripped by a mysterious ailment, and myriad tests and treatments have failed to cure her. She has been told to stand on her head, shun garlic, drink egg yolks in milk, to gain weight and to lose weight. The fits that could strike at any moment keep her confined to the home of her dismissive elder cousin and his wife, who provide her only meals, a room, and a length of cotton to replenish her wardrobe each year. Bibi keeps the inventory of her brother's cosmetics stall and is watched over by the women of their community. She sweeps the store, wondering loudly why she was cursed to this fate, to be alone and jealous of the wives and mothers around her. The women come to the conclusion that she wants a man. When they show her artifacts from their weddings, Bibi proclaims what her own wedding will look like. Bibi is inconsolable at the prospect of never getting married. The women try to calm her by wrapping her in shawls, washing her face or buying her new blouses. After a particularly violent fit, her cousin Haldar emerges to take her to the polyclinic. A remedy is prescribed—marriage: “Relations will calm her blood.” Bibi is delighted by this news and begins to plan and plot the wedding and to prepare herself physically and mentally. But Haldar and his wife dismiss this possibility. She is nearly 30, the wife says, and unskilled in the ways of being a woman: her studies ceased prematurely, she is not allowed to watch TV, she has not been told how to pin a sari or how to prepare meals. The women don't understand why, then, this reluctance to marry her off if she is such a burden to Haldar and his wife. The wife asks who will pay for the wedding.

One morning, wearing a donated sari, Bibi demands that Haldar take her to be photographed so her image can be circulated among the bachelors, like other brides-in-waiting. Haldar refuses. He says she is a bane for business, a liability and a loss. In retaliation, Bibi stops calculating the inventory for the shop and circulates gossip about Haldar's wife. To quiet her down, Haldar places an ad in the paper proclaiming the availability of an “unstable” bride. No family would take the risk. Still, the women try to prepare her for her wifely duties. After two months of no suitors, Haldar and his wife feel vindicated. Things were not so bad when Bibi's father was alive. He created charts of her fits and wrote to doctors abroad to try to cure her. He also distributed information to the members of the village so they were aware of her condition. But now only the women can look after her while being thankful, in private, that she is not their responsibility.

When Haldar's wife gets pregnant, Bibi is kept away from her for fear of infecting the child. Her plates are not washed with the others, and she is given separate towels and soap. Bibi suffers another attack on the banks of the fish pond, convulsing for nearly two minutes. The husbands of the village escort her home in order to find her rest, a compress, and a sedative tablet. But Haldar and his wife do not let her in. That night, Bibi sleeps in the storage room. After a difficult birth, Haldar's wife delivers a girl. Bibi sleeps in the basement and is not allowed direct contact with the girl. She suffers more unchecked fits. The women voice their concerns but it goes unheeded. They take their business elsewhere and the cosmetics in the stall soon expire on their shelves. In autumn, Haldar's daughter becomes ill. Bibi is blamed. Bibi moves back into the storeroom and stops socializing—and stops searching for a husband. By the end of the year, Haldar is driven out of business, and he packs his family up and moves away. He leaves Bibi behind with only a thin envelope of cash.

There is no more news of them and a letter written to Bibi's only other known relative is returned by the postal service. The women spruce up the storeroom and send their children to play on their roof in order to alert others in the event of an attack. At night, however, Bibi is left alone. Haggard, she circles the parapet but never leaves the roof. In spring, vomit is discovered by the cistern and the women find Bibi, pregnant. The women search for traces of assault, but Bibi's storeroom is tidy. She refuses to tell the women who the father is, only saying that she can't remember what happened. A ledger with men's names lay open near her cot. The women help her carry her son to term and teach her how to care for the baby. She takes Haldar's old creams and wares out of the basement and reopens his shop. The women spread the word and soon the stall is providing enough money for Bibi to raise her boy. For years, the women try to sniff out who had disgraced Bibi but to no avail. The one fact they could agree upon is that Bibi seemed to be cured.

=== The Third and Final Continent ===
In "The Third and Final Continent", the narrator lives in India, then moves to London, then finally to America. The title of this story tells us that the narrator has lived in three different continents and chooses to stay in the third, North America. As soon as the narrator arrives, he decides to stay at the YMCA. After saving some money he decides he wants to move somewhere a little more like a home. He responds to an advertisement in the paper and ends up boarding with an elderly woman. At first, he is very respectful and courteous to the elderly woman. The narrator does not feel that he owes the old woman anything and does not go out of his way for her.

But his attitude changes once he discovers that the elderly woman is one hundred and three years old. He becomes more caring and is amazed that this old woman has lived for one hundred and three years. Because of this woman's age, she is not accustomed to the modern times in which this story takes place. The narrator, just like the elderly woman, is not accustomed to the times in America, but also to America in general. This may help the narrator to feel more comfortable in his new setting. After boarding with the elderly woman for about six weeks, the narrator grows somewhat attached to this woman.

Once his wife, who he was set up beforehand to marry, arrives in America he then decides to move to a bigger home. Upon this decision, he also realizes that he is going to have to look out for and nurture his new wife. After living with his wife for a time and learning to know her, he soon finds out that the elderly woman he had once lived with is now dead. This hurts him because this is the first person in America for whom he had felt any feelings. After the woman's death, he then becomes more comfortable with his wife, not because the woman died but because of the time he is spending with his wife. Just like his relationship with the elderly woman, the more time he spends with a person the closer he becomes to them. After some time, the narrator falls in love with his wife, and is frequently remembering the elderly woman with whom he had once resided.

== Development ==
=== Title ===
The title of the collection Interpreter of Maladies was conceived when she was a graduate student and met a Russian Armenian acquaintance in Brookline, Massachusetts, and got to know that he worked part-time as an interpreter in a doctor's office for Russian immigrant patients. Once heard, "it was the closest [she's] ever come to poetry" and jotted the phrase down in her Filofax. She wondered if she would ever use the phrase, and eventually it became the title of her collection five years later.

=== Contents ===
In an interview with Charlie Rose, she stated that when she first started writing, she found writing short stories more comfortable as she "would feel happy if [she] could write one page that seemed right to [her]" and it took her time to lengthen short stories to many pages. Many of the stories are based on Lahiri's and her family's experiences as well as her observations. "A Temporary Matter", the first story in the collection, was written while she was in a fellowship at the Provincetown's Fine Arts Work Center in the fall of 1997, just after she completed her PhD at Boston University. According to Lahiri, this is the first short story she wrote as a 30-year-old unmarried adult. The story is modelled after her parents' closest friends, who lived in Rhode Island when she was seven—a Bengali couple who had lost a premature baby, and an idea of ongoing power outages prompted the start of the story. The second story, "When Mr. Pirzada Came to Dine", came from a vague memory of a Bangladeshi scholar who lived in Rhode Island in the 1970s during the Bangladesh Liberation War and her parents told her about him when she was a child. The two stories, "Mrs. Sen's" and "The Third and Final Continent" are modelled after Lahiri's mother and father, respectively. The fourth and eighth stories, "A Real Durwan" and "The Treatment of Bibi Haldar", were based on two people who lived in "a building where my mother was raised in North Calcutta." For the latter story, she further explained the character development for Bibi Haldar:

"I took as my subject a young woman whom I got to know over the course of a couple of visits. I never saw her having any health problems – but I knew she wanted to be married. She lived in the same building as my aunt and uncle, and we struck up a friendship, not terribly deep and abiding, but a friendship, nevertheless. I learned from my aunt that she had some epileptic-like disease ... I had a brief conversation with my aunt about the last time this woman had a spell, during which she said, “If you hold up something close to her that's made of leather, it helps her.” It sort of stuck in my head. "

== Critical reception ==
Interpreter of Maladies garnered universal acclaim from myriad publications. Michiko Kakutani of the New York Times praises Lahiri for her writing style, citing her as "a writer of uncommon elegance and poise." Time applauded the collection for "illuminating the full meaning of brief relationships—with lovers, family friends, those met in travel". Ronny Noor asserts, "The value of these stories—although some of them are loosely constructed— lies in fact that they transcend confined borders of immigrant experience to embrace larger age-old issues that are, in the words of Ralph Waldo Emerson, 'cast into the mould of these new times' redefining America."

Noelle Brada-Williams notes that Indian-American literature is under-represented and that Lahiri deliberately tries to give a diverse view of Indian Americans so as not to brand the group as a whole. She also argues that Interpreter of Maladies is not just a collection of random short stories that have common components, but a "short story cycle" in which the themes and motifs are intentionally connected to produce a cumulative effect on the reader: "...a deeper look reveals the intricate use of pattern and motif to bind the stories together, including recurring themes of the barriers to and opportunities for human communication; community, including marital, extra-marital, and parent-child relationships; and the dichotomy of care and neglect."

Ketu H. Katrak reads Interpreter of Maladies as reflecting the trauma of self-transformation through immigration, which can result in a series of broken identities that form "multiple anchorages." Lahiri's stories show the diasporic struggle to keep hold of culture as characters create new lives in foreign cultures. Relationships, language, rituals, and religion all help these characters maintain their culture in new surroundings even as they build a "hybrid realization" as Asian Americans.

Laura Anh Williams observes the stories as highlighting the frequently omitted female diasporic subject. Through the foods they eat, and the ways they prepare and eat them, the women in these stories utilize foodways to construct their own unique racialized subjectivity and to engender agency. Williams notes the ability of food in literature to function autobiographically, and in fact, Interpreter of Maladies indeed reflects Lahiri's own family experiences. Lahiri recalls that for her mother, cooking "was her jurisdiction. It was also her secret." For individuals such as Lahiri's' mother, cooking constructs a sense of identity, interrelationship, and home that is simultaneously communal and yet also highly personal.

Bahareh Bahmanpour argues that "Lahiri’s stories prepare a space through which the subaltern can speak", specifically through her female characters in "Mrs. Sen", "This Blessed House", "The Treatment of Bibi Haldar" and "Sexy". Lahiri provides the women with distinct, unique lives, resisting homogenization and appropriation. Lahiri "not only does not appropriate the voice of the female subjects each of whom lead lives that have been touched by the globalization process, but also creates the ideal fictional space in which the subaltern can speak."

Despite being a best-selling book, Interpreter of Maladies received mixed reviews in India, where reviewers were alternately enthusiastic and upset Lahiri had "not paint[ed] Indians in a more positive light" and criticised for writing about "a bunch of depressing Indian immigrants in the United States ... And giving them a bad name." They also questioned if Lahiri was a "true Indian" to write about India. She said, "It did push some buttons in me because I felt that these were issues I had been dealing with all of my life in terms of how I fit into India and how sort of a true Indian or you know would view me."

== Translation ==
Interpreter of Maladies has been translated into many languages:

Title	Language	Translator	Year	Reference
Bedonar Bhashyakar	Bengali	Kamalika Mitra, Payel Sengupta	2009	OCLC 701116398
Преводачът на болести (Prevodachat na bolesti)	Bulgarian	Преводачът на болести	2010	ISBN 9789544916510
Intèrpret d'emocions	Catalan	Andreu Garriga i Joan	2000	OCLC 433389700
ترجمان الأوجاع	Arabic	Marwa Hashim	2009	OCLC 1006316486
疾病解说者 (Jíbìng Jiěshuōzhě)	Chinese (Mainland China edition)	Wu Bingqing, Lu Xiaohui	2005	OCLC 61357011
醫生的翻譯員 (Yīshēng de Fānyìyuán)	Chinese (Taiwan edition)	Wu Meizhen	2001	OCLC 814021559
Een tijdelijk ongemak	Dutch	Marijke Emeis	1999	OCLC 67724681
L'interprète des maladies	French	Jean-Pierre Aoustin	2000	OCLC 45716386
Melancholie der Ankunft	German	Barbara Heller	2000	OCLC 46621568
פרשן המחלות (Parshan ha-maḥalot)	Hebrew	Shelomit Apel	2001	OCLC 48419549
Penerjemah luka	Indonesian	Gita Yuliani	2006	OCLC 271894107
L'interprete dei malanni	Italian	Claudia Tarolo	2000	OCLC 797691119
停電の夜に (Teiden no Yoru ni)	Japanese	Rhett Brush	2000	OCLC 48129142
축복받은집 (Chukbok Badeun Jip)	Korean	Yi Jong-in	2001	OCLC 47635500
വ്യാധികളുടെ വ്യാഖ്യാതാവ് (Vyādhikaḷuṭe vyākhyātāv)	Malayalam	Suneetha B.	2012	OCLC 794205405
مترجم دردها (Motarjem-e Dard-hā)	Persian	Amir Mahdi Haghighat	2004	OCLC 136969770
Tłumacz chorób	Polish	Maria Jaszczurowska	2002	OCLC 51538427
Intérprete de emociones	Spanish	Antonio Padilla	2000	OCLC 47735039
Den indiske tolken	Swedish	Eva Sjöstrand	2001	OCLC 186542833
Dert yorumcusu	Turkish	Neşfa Dereli	2000	OCLC 850767827
Người dịch bệnh	Vietnamese	Đặng Tuyết Anh; Ngân Xuyên	2004	OCLC 63823740
