= Burkett =

Burkett may refer to:

== Places ==
- Burkett, Texas, unincorporated community in Coleman County, Texas, United States
- Burkett Islands, group of small islands lying just west of Mount Gleadell in the eastern part of Amundsen Bay, in Enderby Land
- Burkett Nunatak, 2180 metres high, 2 km east of Minaret Nunatak, in the Monument Nunataks, Victoria Land, Antarctica
- Mount Burkett, a summit in Alaska
  - Burkett Needle, a spire on Mount Burkett

== People with the surname ==
- B. G. Burkett, author of the book Stolen Valor
- Bartine Burkett (1898–1994), American film actress
- Bill Burkett, CBS source in the Killian documents affair of 2004
- Brendan Burkett (born 1963), Australian swimmer who won five medals at four Paralympics
- Cary Burkett, American radio broadcaster and former comic book writer
- Chris Burkett (born 1962), former professional American football player
- Christopher Burkett (born 1951), American landscape photographer
- Daniel Burkett (born 1995), Canadian racing driver
- Elinor Burkett (born 1946), American producer, director, journalist and author
- Elmer Burkett (1867–1935), Representative and a Senator from Nebraska
- F. Michael Burkett (born 1948), attorney and Democratic politician from Idaho
- Garth Burkett (1927–2012), Australian footballer
- Graham Burkett (1936–2014), Australian politician
- Jack Burkett (born 1942), English former footballer
- Jackie Burkett (1936–2017), former American football center
- Jason Burkett, character in the film Into the Abyss
- Jeff Burkett (1921–1947), American football player
- Jesse Burkett (1868–1953), former Major League Baseball player
- John Burkett (born 1964), former Major League Baseball pitcher
- Larry Burkett (1939–2003), American author and radio personality
- Mary Burkett (1924–2014), English gallery curator
- Michael Burkett (disambiguation)
- Michael John Burkett (born 1967), American musician, known as Fat Mike, in the punk rock band NOFX
- Neil Burkett (born 1948), South African bowler
- N. J. Burkett (born 1962), correspondent for WABC-TV in the United States
- Ronnie Burkett (born 1957), Canadian puppeteer
- Seth Burkett (born 1991), English professional footballer
- Susan Burkett, American electronics engineer and professor
- Walter Burkett (1931–2015), German scholar of Greek mythology and cult

== People with the given name ==
- Myles Burkett Foster (1825–1899), popular English illustrator, watercolour artist and engraver
- James Burkett Hartle (1939–2023), American physicist from Baltimore

== Other uses ==
- Burkett Restaurant Equipment, food-service equipment and supplies dealer, headquartered in Toledo, Ohio, USA
- White Burkett Miller Center of Public Affairs, non-partisan research institute, part of the University of Virginia

== See also ==
- Burkitt
- Buket (born 1983), graffiti artist
- Burk (disambiguation)
