= Texas Highways =

Monthly travel magazine published in Texas

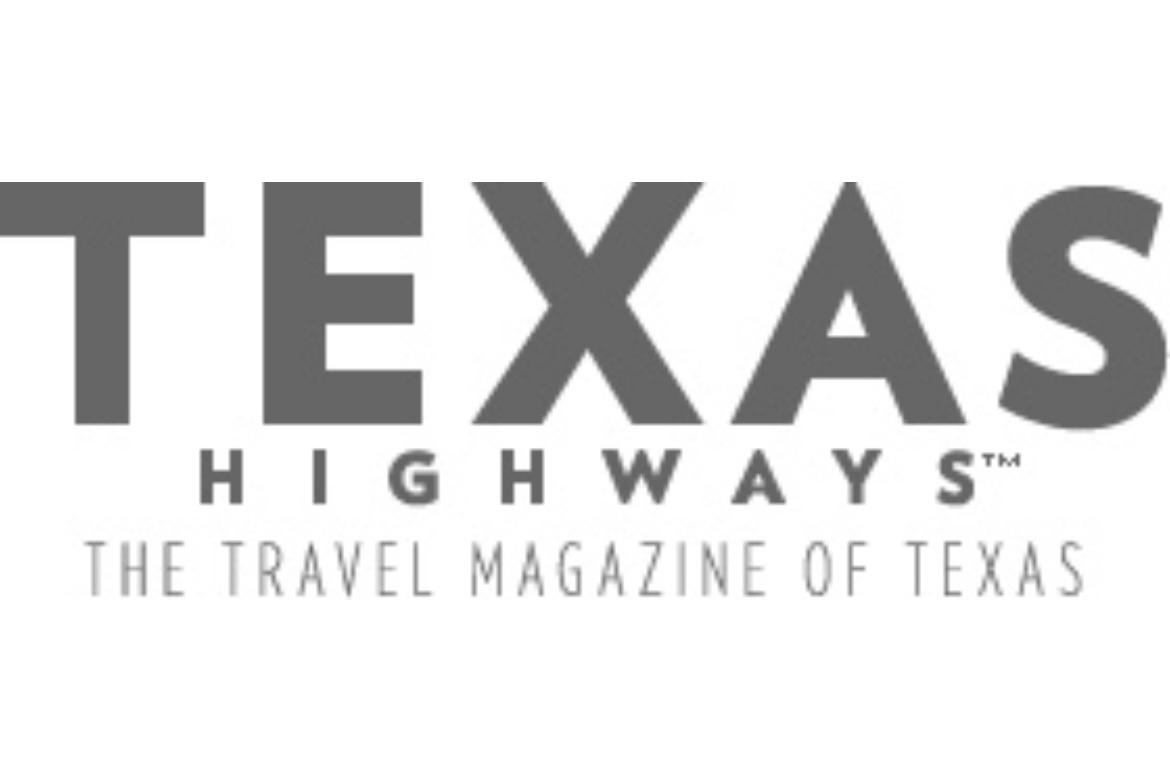
- Editor: Emily Stone
- Former editors: Frank Lively (1974-1990); Tommie Pinkard (1990-1992); Jack Lowry (1992-2006); Jill Lawless (2012-2016)
- Categories: Travel, Leisure
- Frequency: Monthly
- Publisher: Andrea Lin
- Total circulation: 300,000 (2022)
- Founded: 1974
- Company: Texas Department of Transportation
- Country: United States
- Based in: Austin, Texas
- Language: English
- Website: www.texashighways.com
- ISSN: 0040-4349
- OCLC: 999544444

Texas Highways is a monthly American travel magazine published by the Texas Department of Transportation and based in Austin, Texas. Founded in 1953 as an internal employee newsletter, it was converted into a public travel publication in 1974 and designated the official travel magazine of Texas by the state legislature the following year.

The magazine covers travel destinations, history, food and drink, nature, and cultural life across the state, and is known for its landscape photography. It is a member of the City and Regional Magazine Association (CRMA) and the International Regional Magazine Association (IRMA).

== History ==
Texas Highways began in 1953 when the Texas Highway Department renamed its employee newsletter, the Maintenance and Construction Bulletin, as a publication covering highway design, construction, and maintenance. Following the passage of a 1959 state law authorizing Texas to promote tourism, the agency reorganized its Travel and Information Division. Division director Tom Taylor appointed Frank Lively as editor of Texas Highways in 1962, and Lively began adding features on history, scenery, and travel.

In 1970, Lively proposed converting the magazine into a public travel publication. Texas Highways began accepting public subscriptions in May 1974, with its first issue dedicated to Native Americans in Texas despite the opposition from the director of the Travel and Information Division at the time, who claimed "...never to devote an entire issue to one subject." In 1975, Governor Dolph Briscoe signed a concurrent resolution of the state legislature designating Texas Highways the official travel magazine of Texas.

Lively retired in 1990 and retained an active relationship with the publication. Tommie Pinkard succeeded him as editor, followed by Jack Lowry in 1992. Jill Lawless, a 27-year employee, served as editor until her retirement in 2016. Emily Roberts Stone became editor-in-chief in 2016.

Circulation reached 400,000 by 1987 and peaked at 439,836 in 1993. By 1995, subscribers lived in every U.S. state and more than 100 countries. Circulation was approximately 223,000 in 2006 and 300,000 in 2022.

In July 2024, Texas Highways debuted its first redesign in nearly a decade in a 50th anniversary issue titled "Small Town Summer." The redesign won the City and Regional Magazine Association's Excellence in Design award in 2025.

== Contents ==
Texas Highways publishes articles on travel, history, food and drink, nature, and arts and culture in Texas, emphasizing photography and coverage of small towns and lesser-known destinations. The magazine has described its mission as "to encourage travel to and within Texas."

Print departments include front-of-book travel service sections; a Postcards section of personal essays and columns, including the Open Road personal essay, Dispatch, Speaking of Texas, Texana, and Like a Local; long-form reported features; a food and drink section called Fuel; and Vintage, which pairs archival photography with historical context. Online, the magazine publishes Roadside Oddities, a series on unusual Texas landmarks.

The Open Road section, launched in 2018 under deputy editor Michael Hoinski, publishes a monthly personal essay by a Texas writer about a specific place in the state. Recent contributors include Lacy M. Johnson, Jenny Tinghui Zhang, Luis Jaramillo, Lauren Hough, and Emily Gogolak. In 2021, an Open Road submission earned the magazine its first National Magazine Award nomination. Work from the section has received notable mention in The Best American Essays.

== Awards ==
In 2021, Texas Highways received its first National Magazine Award nomination, in the Columns and Commentary category, for three Open Road personal essays from 2020 by Antonio Ruiz-Camacho, ire'ne lara silva, and Roberto José Andrade Franco. Competing publications included The Atlantic, The Economist, The New Yorker, and The Paris Review. In 2022, the magazine received a second consecutive National Magazine Award nomination, in the Lifestyle Journalism category, for stories from its September 2021 "Cowboy Issue."

ire'ne lara silva's Open Road essay "A Place Before Words" won the 2021 Edwin "Bud" Shrake Award for Best Short Nonfiction from the Texas Institute of Letters.

Texas Highways has won multiple City and Regional Magazine Association awards, including for the following issues:

- Excellence in Design, 2025, for the 50th anniversary "Small Town Summer" issue
- Special Issue, 2025, for the September 2024 "Magic Valley" issue
- Special Issue, 2026, for the September 2025 "BIG Issue" issue

The magazine has also received recognition from the American Society of Magazine Editors for four consecutive years beginning in 2021. In 2024, the September 2023 "The Outlaw Issue" edition was a finalist for the ASME Best Cover Contest in the Best Local Magazine Cover category.

Work from Texas Highways and has been selected for The Best American Magazine Writing and received notable mention in The Best American Travel Writing and The Best American Essays.

== Notable staff and contributors ==
Contributors to Texas Highways have included nationally recognized Texas writers and photographers:

=== Writers ===
- Sarah Bird
- Ana Marie Cox
- Rachel Monroe
- Roger Reeves
- Fowzia Karimi
- Michael Corcoran
- Joe R. Lansdale
- Gabino Iglesias
- Rick Bass
- Fernando A. Flores
- Jenny Tinghui Zhang
- Lacy M. Johnson
- ire’ne lara silva, 2023 Texas State Poet Laureate
- Elizabeth Bruenig
- Luis Jaramillo

=== Photographers ===
- Keith Carter
- Wyman Meinzer
