= Jon Krakauer =

American writer and journalist (born 1954)

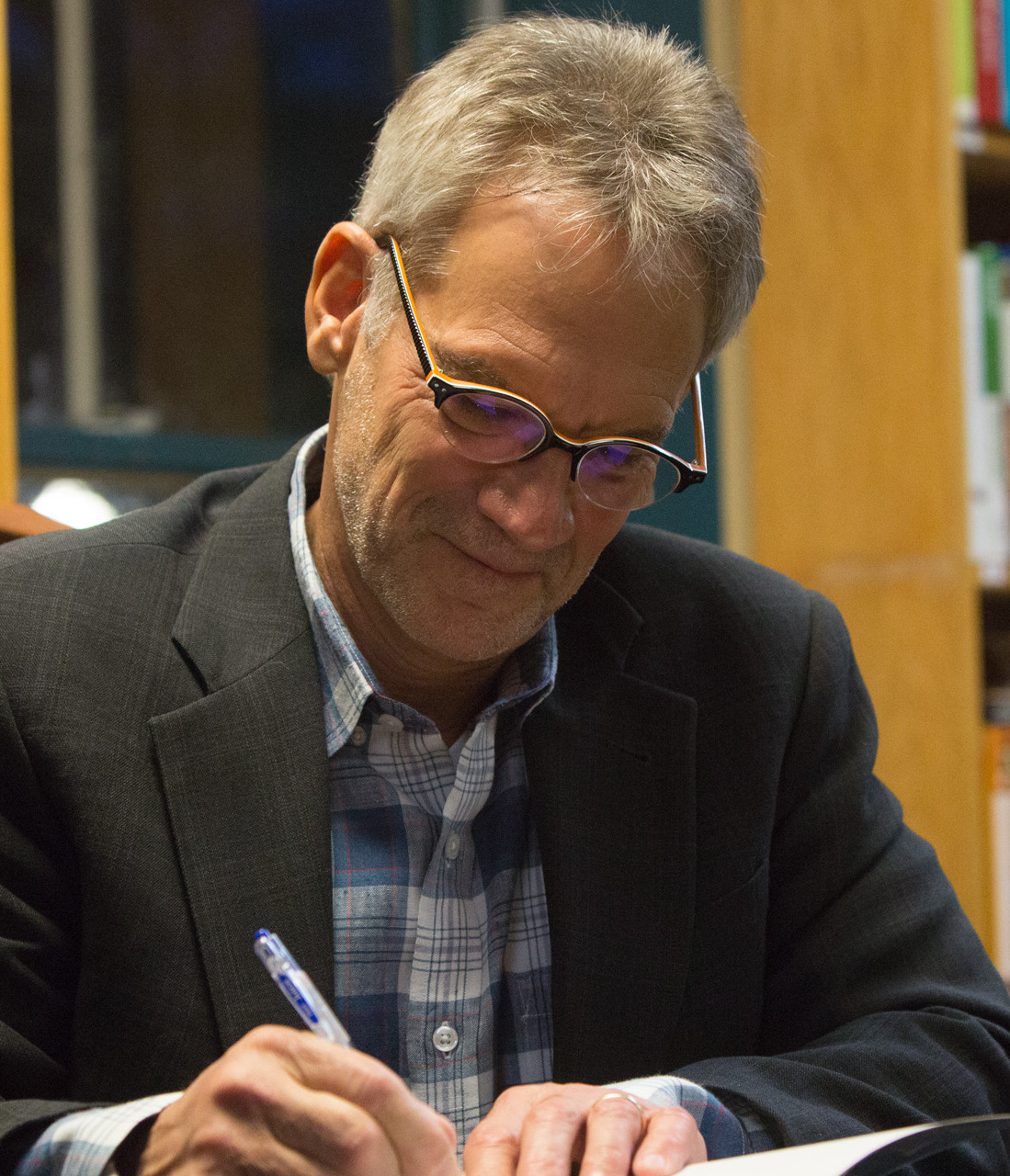
- Krakauer in 2016
- Born: April 12, 1954 (age 72); Brookline, Massachusetts, U.S.
- Education: Hampshire College (BA)
- Occupations: Writer, mountaineer
- Spouse: Linda Mariam Moore (m. 1980)
- Writing career
- Period: 1990–present
- Subject: Outdoor literature

Jon Krakauer (born April 12, 1954) is an American writer and mountaineer. He is the author of bestselling nonfiction books—Into the Wild; Into Thin Air; Under the Banner of Heaven; and Where Men Win Glory: The Odyssey of Pat Tillman—as well as numerous magazine articles. He was a member of an ill-fated expedition to summit Mount Everest in 1996, one of the deadliest disasters in the history of climbing Everest, which would become the subject of Into Thin Air.

== Early life ==
Krakauer was born in Brookline, Massachusetts, as the third of five children of Carol Ann (née Jones) and Lewis Joseph Krakauer. His father was Jewish and his mother was a Unitarian of Scandinavian descent. He was raised in Corvallis, Oregon. His father introduced the young Krakauer to mountaineering at the age of eight. His father was "relentlessly competitive and ambitious in the extreme" and placed high expectations on Krakauer, wishing for his son to attend Harvard Medical School and become a doctor. Krakauer wrote that this was his father's view of "life's one sure path to meaningful success and lasting happiness." He competed in tennis at Corvallis High School, and graduated in 1972. He went on to study at Hampshire College in Amherst, Massachusetts, where in 1976 he received his degree in environmental studies. In 1977, he met former climber Linda Mariam Moore, and they married in 1980. They lived in Seattle, Washington, but moved to Boulder, Colorado, after the release of Krakauer's book Into Thin Air.

== Mountaineering ==
After graduating from college in 1977, Krakauer spent three weeks alone in the wilderness of the Stikine Icecap region of Alaska and climbed a new route on the Devils Thumb, an experience he described in Eiger Dreams and in Into the Wild. In 1992, he made his way to Cerro Torre in the Andes of Patagonia—a sheer granite peak considered to be one of the most difficult technical climbs in the world.

In 1996, Krakauer took part in a guided ascent of Mount Everest. His group was one of those caught in the 1996 Mount Everest disaster, in which a violent storm trapped a number of climbers high on the slopes of the mountain. Krakauer reached the peak and returned to camp, but four of his teammates (including group leader Rob Hall) died while making their descent in the storm.

A candid recollection of the event was published in Outside magazine and, later, in the book Into Thin Air. By the end of the 1996 climbing season, fifteen people had died on the mountain, making it the deadliest single year in Everest history to that point. This has since been exceeded by the sixteen deaths in the 2014 Mount Everest avalanche, and the 2015 earthquake avalanche disaster in which twenty-two people were killed. Krakauer has publicly criticized the commercialization of Mount Everest.

== Journalism ==
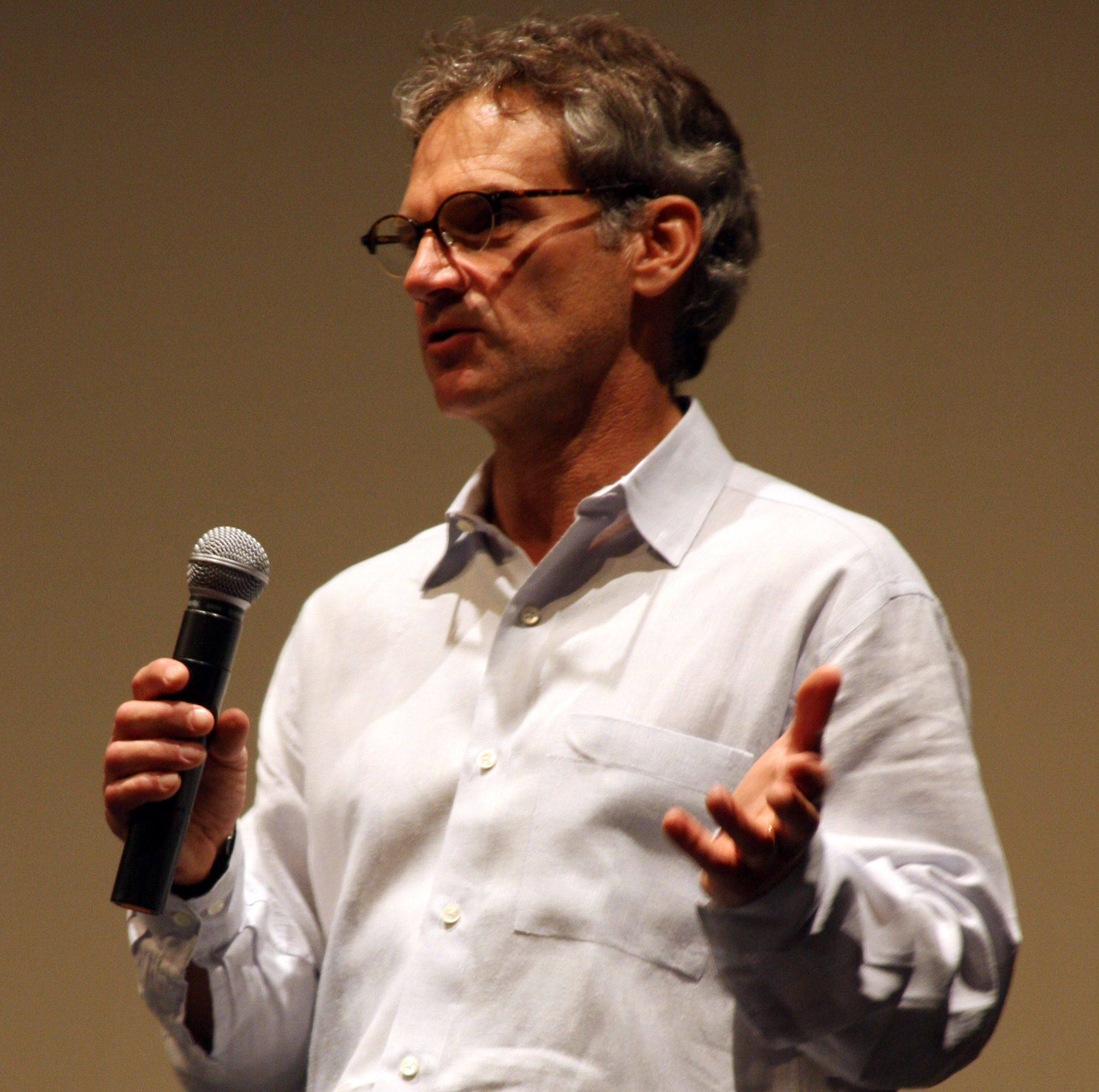
Krakauer in 2009

In 1999, he received an Arts and Letters award for Literature from the American Academy of Arts and Letters.

== Books ==
=== Eiger Dreams ===
Eiger Dreams: Ventures Among Men and Mountains (1990) is a nonfiction collection of articles and essays by Jon Krakauer on mountaineering and rock climbing. It concerns a variety of topics, from ascending the Eiger Nordwand in the Swiss Alps, Denali in Alaska or K2 in the Karakoram, to the well-known rock climbers Krakauer has met on his trips, such as John Gill.

=== Into the Wild ===
Into the Wild was published in 1996 and spent two years on The New York Times Best Seller List. The book employs a non-linear narrative that documents the travels of Christopher McCandless, a young man from a well-to-do East Coast family who, in 1990, after graduating from Emory University, donated all of the money ($24,000) in his bank account to the humanitarian charity Oxfam, renamed himself "Alexander Supertramp", and began a journey in the American West. McCandless' remains were found in September 1992; he had died of starvation in Alaska on the Stampede Trail. In the book, Krakauer draws parallels between McCandless' experiences and his own, and the experiences of other adventurers. Into The Wild was adapted into a film of the same name, which was released on September 21, 2007.

=== Into Thin Air ===
In 1997, Krakauer expanded his September 1996 Outside article into Into Thin Air. The book describes the climbing parties' experiences and the general state of Everest mountaineering at the time. Hired as a journalist by the magazine, Krakauer had participated as a client of the 1996 Everest climbing team led by Rob Hall—the team which ended up suffering the greatest casualties in the 1996 Mount Everest disaster.

The book reached the top of The New York Times' nonfiction bestseller list, was honored as "Book of the Year" by Time magazine, and was among three books considered for the Pulitzer Prize for General Nonfiction in 1998. The American Academy of Arts and Letters gave Krakauer an Academy Award in Literature in 1999 for his work, commenting that the writer "combines the tenacity and courage of the finest tradition of investigative journalism with the stylish subtlety and profound insight of the born writer. His account of an ascent of Mount Everest has led to a general reevaluation of climbing and of the commercialization of what was once a romantic, solitary sport."

Krakauer has contributed royalties from this book to the Everest '96 Memorial Fund at the Boulder Community Foundation, which he founded as a tribute to his deceased climbing partners.

In a TV-movie version of the book, Krakauer was played by Christopher McDonald. Everest, a feature film based on the events of the disaster directed by Baltasar Kormákur, was released in 2015. In the film, Krakauer is portrayed by Michael Kelly. Krakauer denounced the movie, saying some of its details were fabricated and defamatory. He also expressed regret regarding Sony's rapid acquisition of the rights to the book. Director Baltasar Kormákur responded, claiming Krakauer's first-person account was not used as source material for the film.

In the book, Krakauer noted that Russian-Kazakh guide Anatoli Boukreev, Scott Fischer's top guide on the expedition, ascended the summit without supplemental oxygen, "which didn't seem to be in [the] clients' best interest". He also wrote that Boukreev descended from the summit several hours ahead of his clients, and that this was "extremely unorthodox behavior for a guide". He noted however that, once he had descended to the top camp, Boukreev was heroic in his tireless attempts to rescue the missing climbers. Five months after Into Thin Air was published, Boukreev gave his own account of the Everest disaster in the book The Climb, co-written with G. Weston DeWalt.

Differences centered on what experienced mountaineers thought about the facts of Boukreev's performance. As photographer Galen Rowell wrote, "the fact [is] that every one of Boukreev's clients survived without major injuries while the clients who died or received major injuries were members of your party. Could you explain how Anatoli [Boukreev]'s shortcomings as a guide led to the survival of his clients…?" In an opinion piece in The Wall Street Journal, Rowell cited numerous inconsistencies in Krakauer's narrative, observing that Krakauer was sleeping in his tent while Boukreev was rescuing other climbers. Rowell argued that Boukreev's actions were nothing short of heroic, and his judgment prescient: "[Boukreev] foresaw problems with clients nearing camp, noted five other guides on the peak [Everest], and positioned himself to be rested and hydrated enough to respond to an emergency. His heroism was not a fluke." After the publication of Into Thin Air and The Climb, DeWalt, Boukreev, and Krakauer became embroiled in disagreements about Krakauer's portrayal of Boukreev. Krakauer had reached a détente with Boukreev in November 1997, but the Russian climber was killed by an avalanche only a few weeks later while climbing Annapurna. In addition to Boukreev, other expedition members took issue with Krakauer's depiction of the events, including Gau Ming-ho and Sandy Hill Pittman. Pittman's criticism focuses on Krakauer's inaccurate depiction of her as inexperienced and a hindrance to the group.

Neal Beidleman supports Krakauer's accuracy and echoes concerns about Boukreev. David Breashears said his film Storm Over Everest was "complimentary to Into Thin Air. Jon Krakauer is a very good friend of mine." Beck Weathers said Krakauer portrayed his ordeal honestly. Beidleman, Breahshears, and Weathers were all on Everest and survived the storm. Peter Athans, one of the most accomplished American Himalayan mountaineers of the modern era, affirmed that Krakauer did not exaggerate or misrepresent the storm.

In 2015 Krakauer said: “I wish I’d never gone. I suffered for years, I still suffer from what happened. I’m glad I wrote a book about it, but you know, if I could go back and relive my life, I never would have climbed Everest.”

=== Under the Banner of Heaven ===
In 2003, Under the Banner of Heaven became Krakauer's third nonfiction bestseller. The book examines extremes of religious belief, specifically fundamentalist offshoots of Mormonism. Krakauer looks at the practice of polygamy in these offshoots and scrutinizes it in the context of the Latter Day Saints (LDS) religion throughout its history. Much of the focus of the book is on the Lafferty brothers, who murdered Erica and Brenda Lafferty on July 24, 1984, in the name of their fundamentalist faith.

In 2006, Tom Elliott and Pawel Gula produced a documentary inspired by the book, Damned to Heaven.

Robert Millet, Professor of Religious Understanding at Brigham Young University, an LDS institution, reviewed the book and described it as confusing, poorly organized, misleading, erroneous, prejudicial and insulting. Mike Otterson, Director of Media Relations for the Church of Jesus Christ of Latter-day Saints, told the Associated Press, "This book is not history, and Krakauer is no historian. He is a storyteller who cuts corners to make the story sound good. His basic thesis appears to be that people who are religious are irrational, and that irrational people do strange things."

In response, Krakauer criticized the LDS Church hierarchy, citing the opinion of D. Michael Quinn, a historian who was excommunicated in 1993, who wrote that "The tragic reality is that there have been occasions when Church leaders, teachers, and writers have not told the truth they knew about difficulties of the Mormon past, but have offered to the Saints instead a mixture of platitudes, half-truths, omissions, and plausible denials." Krakauer wrote, "I happen to share Dr. Quinn's perspective".

In April 2022, a limited series of Under the Banner of Heaven was released by Hulu starring Andrew Garfield and Daisy Edgar-Jones.

=== Where Men Win Glory: The Odyssey of Pat Tillman ===
In the October 25, 2007, season premiere of Iconoclasts on the Sundance Channel, Krakauer mentioned being deeply embroiled in the writing of a new book, but did not reveal the title, subject, or expected date of completion. Doubleday Publishing originally planned to release the book in the fall of 2008, but postponed the launch in June of that year, announcing that Krakauer was "unhappy with the manuscript."

The book, Where Men Win Glory: The Odyssey of Pat Tillman, was released by Doubleday on September 15, 2009. It draws on the journals and letters of Pat Tillman, an NFL professional football player and U.S. Army Ranger whose death in Afghanistan made him a symbol of American sacrifice and heroism, though it also became a subject of controversy because of the U.S. Army's cover-up of the fact that Tillman died by friendly fire. The book draws on the journals and letters of Tillman, interviews with his wife and friends, conversations with the soldiers who served alongside him, and research Krakauer performed in Afghanistan. It also serves in part as a historical narrative, providing a general history of the civil wars in Afghanistan.

Writing about the book in the New York Times Book Review, Dexter Filkins said that "too many of the details of Tillman’s life recounted here are mostly banal and inconsequential," but also stated, concerning Tillman's death, "While most of the facts have been reported before, Krakauer performs a valuable service by bringing them all together—particularly those about the cover-up. The details, even five years later, are nauseating to read." In his review in the Los Angeles Times, Dan Neil wrote that the book is "a beautiful bit of reporting" and "the definitive version of events surrounding Tillman's death."

=== Three Cups of Deceit: How Greg Mortenson, Humanitarian Hero, Lost His Way ===
Three Cups of Deceit is a 2011 e-book that made claims of mismanagement and accounting fraud by Greg Mortenson, a humanitarian who built schools in Pakistan and Afghanistan; and his charity, the Central Asia Institute (CAI). It was later released in paperback by Anchor Books.

The book—and a related 60 Minutes interview broadcast the day before the book's release—were controversial. Some CAI donors filed a class-action lawsuit against Mortenson for having allegedly defrauded them with false claims in his books. The suit was eventually rejected. In December 2011, CAI produced a comprehensive list of projects completed over a period of years and projects CAI is currently working on.

Mortenson and CAI were investigated by the Montana attorney general, who determined that they had made financial "missteps", and the Attorney General reached a settlement for restitution from Mortenson to CAI in excess of $1 million.

The 2016 documentary 3000 Cups of Tea by Jennifer Jordan and Jeff Rhoads claims that the accusations against Mortenson put forward by 60 Minutes and Jon Krakauer are largely untrue. Jordan said in 2014: "We are still investigating this story. So far, our findings are indicating that the majority of the allegations are grossly misrepresented to make him appear in the worst possible light, or are outright false. Yes, Greg is a bad manager and accountant, and he is the first to admit that, but he is also a tireless humanitarian with a crucially important mission."

=== Missoula: Rape and the Justice System in a College Town ===
Missoula: Rape and the Justice System in a College Town (2015) explores how rape is handled by colleges and the criminal justice system. The book follows several case studies of women raped in Missoula, Montana, many of them linked in some way to the University of Montana. Krakauer attempts to illuminate why many victims do not want to report their rapes to the police, and he criticizes the justice system for giving the benefit of the doubt to assailants but not to victims. Krakauer was inspired to write the book when a friend of his, a young woman, revealed to him that she had been raped.

Emily Bazelon, writing for the New York Times Book Review, gave the book a lukewarm review, criticizing it for not fully exploring its characters or appreciating the difficulty colleges face in handling and trying to prevent sexual assault, writing that "Instead of delving deeply into questions of fairness as universities try to fulfill a recent government mandate to conduct their own investigations and hearings—apart from the police and the courts—Krakauer settles for bromides."

Writing in the Los Angeles Times, Lacy M. Johnson gave the book a positive review, describing the writing as "compelling" and the research as "meticulous". "I wish women didn’t need a voice such as his to corroborate our experience of violence, but I am glad we have him as an ally in this work," Johnson wrote. "Missoula will undoubtedly fortify those of us who have already broken our silence and may rally those who have not dared to. There is some justice in that, no matter how complicated and faint."

=== As editor ===
As of 2004, Krakauer edits the Exploration series of the Modern Library.

== See also ==
- Timeline of the 1996 Mount Everest disaster

== Selected bibliography ==
- Eiger Dreams: Ventures Among Men and Mountains (1990) ISBN 0-385-48818-1
- Into the Wild (1996) ISBN 0-385-48680-4
- Into Thin Air (1997) ISBN 0-385-49208-1 (expanded from an article in Outside magazine)
- Under the Banner of Heaven: A Story of Violent Faith (2003) ISBN 0-385-50951-0
- Where Men Win Glory: The Odyssey of Pat Tillman (2009)
- Three Cups of Deceit (2011)
- Missoula: Rape and the Justice System in a College Town (2015) ISBN 0385538731
- Classic Krakauer: Essays on Wilderness and Risk (2019) ISBN 1984897691

== Sources ==
- DeWalt, Weston; Anatoli Boukreev (1999). The Climb: Tragic Ambitions on Everest (2nd expanded ed.). New York: St. Martin's Griffin. ISBN 978-0-312-20637-6.
- Krakauer, Jon (1999). Into Thin Air: A Personal Account of the Mount Everest Disaster. New York: First Anchor Books. ISBN 978-0-385-49478-6.
