= Devils Thumb =

Mountain in the Stikine Icecap region

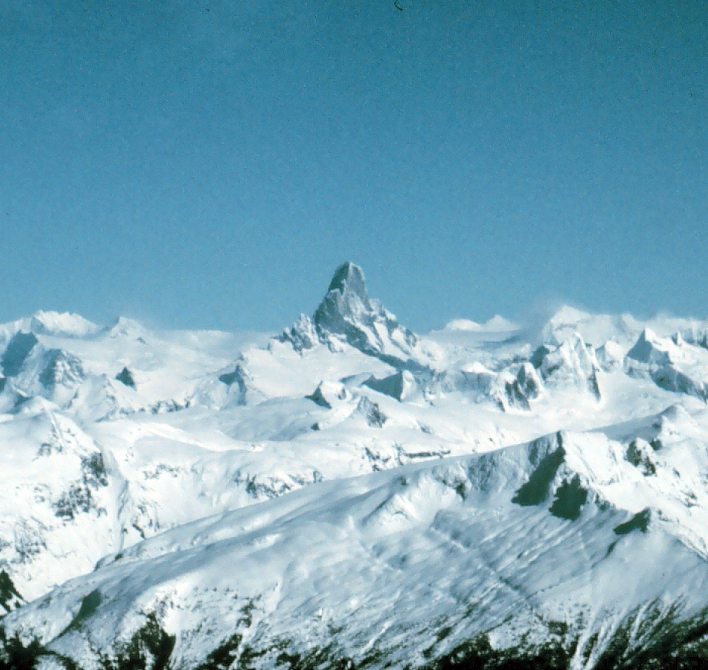

Highest point
- Elevation: 9,077 ft (2,767 m)
- Coordinates: 57°05′28″N 132°22′00″W

Geography
- Location within Alaska Location within British Columbia Location within Canada
- Interactive map of Devils Thumb
- Location: Southeastern Alaska, U.S. and northwestern British Columbia, Canada
- Parent range: Stikine Icecap, Boundary Ranges
- Topo map(s): USGS Sumdum A-2; NTS 104F1 Dominion Mountain

Climbing
- First ascent: 1946 by Fred Beckey, Clifford Schmidtke, Bob Craig
- Easiest route: rock/snow/ice climb

Devils Thumb, or Taalkhunaxhkʼu Shaa in Tlingit, is a mountain in the Stikine Icecap region of the Alaska–British Columbia border, near Petersburg. It is named for its projected thumb-like appearance. Its name in the Tlingit language means "the mountain that never flooded" and is said to have been a refuge for people during Aangalakhu ("the Great Flood"). It is one of the peaks that marks the border between the United States and Canada, and is also listed on maps as Boundary Peak 71.

Devils Thumb is a very challenging climb even for advanced mountain climbers.

== Location ==
Devils Thumb is part of a group of striking, difficult rock peaks on the western edge of the Stikine Icecap. The Stikine Icecap occupies the crest of the Boundary Ranges, a subrange of the Coast Mountains spanning the Canada–United States border, north of the mouth of the Stikine River. Other peaks in the area include the Witches Tits and Cat's Ears Spires (part of the western ridge of the Devils Thumb massif itself), and Mount Burkett and Burkett Needle, a pair of spires about 8 mi (13 km) to the northeast.

== Notable features ==
The most famous feature on the Devils Thumb among climbers is its Northwest Face, rising 6,700 ft (2,042 m) from the Witches Cauldron at its base to the summit, at an average angle of 67 degrees. This is the biggest rock face in North America. The conditions prevalent also make it perhaps the most dangerous climbing proposition on the continent.

== Climbing history ==
The first ascent of the Devils Thumb in 1946 was a landmark in North American mountaineering. Fred Beckey, along with Clifford Schmidtke and Bob Craig, climbed the East Ridge, a route that combined technical difficulty equal to anything ever climbed on the continent to that time with great remoteness and terrible weather conditions.

The Northwest Face has seen many attempts; at least three teams have died on this face. It stands as a huge wall with bad weather, bad rock, bad ice, and bad avalanches. "It is a dangerous and difficult face that rarely, if ever, comes into condition," says Dieter Klose, who in 1982 made it halfway up the route, higher than anybody else alive.

In 1977, author Jon Krakauer climbed the East Ridge of the Devils Thumb, a feat described in detail in his book Eiger Dreams: Ventures Among Men and Mountains. Krakauer also chronicles his solo ascent of Devils Thumb in chapters 14 and 15 of his book Into the Wild.

In 2010, Colin Haley and Mikey Schaefer completed a 3 day traverse across the Witches’ Tits, Cat’s Ears Spires, and Devil’s Thumb, calling it the Diablo Traverse (5.10 A2), building on an earlier attempt by Jon Walsh and Andre Ike in 2004. https://publications.americanalpineclub.org/articles/12201112200/Devils-Thumb-Diablo-Traverse & https://colinhaley.com/devils-thumb-the-diablo-traverse/

In 2023, Alex Honnold and Tommy Caldwell successfully scaled all 5 peaks in just under 12 hours, completing the first ever single day traverse of the Devil’s Thumb skyline. Their climb is documented in the 2024 National Geographic film The Devil's Climb.

== See also ==
- Alaska boundary dispute

== Notes ==
1. The peak's official name carries no apostrophe.
2. A shoulder of the peak is the crash site of Dirk Benedict's character's plane in the 1996 film Alaska.
