= Missoula: Rape and the Justice System in a College Town =

2015 nonfiction book by Jon Krakauer

- Author: Jon Krakauer
- Language: English
- Genre: Non-fiction
- Publisher: Doubleday
- Publication date: 2015
- Publication place: United States
- Pages: 367 pp. (Hardcover edition)
- ISBN: 978-0-3855-3873-2
- Preceded by: Three Cups of Deceit
- Followed by: Classic Krakauer: Essays on Wilderness and Risk

Missoula: Rape and the Justice System in a College Town is a 2015 nonfiction book written by Jon Krakauer. It details the stories of several female students raped in Missoula, Montana, with many of the rapes linked in some way to the University of Montana and their football team. Krakauer attempts to illuminate why many victims do not wish to report their rapes to the police and he criticizes the justice system for giving the benefit of the doubt to assailants but not to victims. Krakauer was inspired to write the book when a friend revealed to him that she had been raped.

== Summary ==
Krakauer chronicles the experiences of three female college students who alleged they were victims of sexual assault, detailing the different avenues they utilized to pursue justice, and the pushback they faced from systemic forces. Of the three cases, two involved members of the University of Montana Football team, linebacker Beau Donaldson (who pleaded guilty to the rape of one of the victims) and quarterback Jordan Johnson (who was acquitted in state court after being expelled by the university). The third case involves the struggles of a student's case that prosecutors declined to pursue, and her decision to go to the press.

Krakauer sheds light on the various obstacles women face when reporting their assaults to the authorities, such as fear of the resulting backlash of their community, prosecutors not believing their stories, and the struggle of having to relive the trauma as the case works its way through the justice system. Krakauer also notes how the victims experienced backlash and pushback from many Grizzlies fans. The book additionally highlights the action of current Missoula County Attorney Kirsten Pabst, as prior to her current position she "left her position as chief deputy county attorney to successfully defend star UM quarterback Jordan Johnson in a highly publicized rape trial. After his acquittal, she was elected to county attorney, having campaigned on a promise of reforming the office to show more compassion toward victims."

Krakauer concludes the book by noting how the circumstances at the University of Montana are not unique and that sexual assault on college campuses remains a nationwide problem.

== Controversy ==
Some residents of Missoula took issue with the title of the book, questioning whether or not it was right to highlight the name of the city, given the fact that rape is a nationwide issue. Kirsten Pabst reportedly sent a letter to the book's publisher in an attempt to stall its release, claiming that the book was based on "half truths" and that it essentially "constitutes one sided journalism." Krakauer responded that he sent her office "questions that were never answered."

== Reception ==
Emily Bazelon, writing for The New York Times Book Review, gave the book a lukewarm review, criticizing it for not fully exploring its characters or appreciating the difficulty colleges face in handling and trying to prevent sexual assault. "Instead of delving deeply into questions of fairness as universities try to fulfill a recent government mandate to conduct their own investigations and hearings—apart from the police and the courts—Krakauer settles for bromides," Bazelon wrote. "University procedures should 'swiftly identify student offenders and prevent them from reoffending, while simultaneously safeguarding the rights of the accused,' he writes, asserting that this 'will be difficult, but it's not rocket science.'"

Writing in the Los Angeles Times, Lacy M. Johnson gave the book a positive review, describing the writing as "compelling" and the research as "meticulous." "I wish women didn’t need a voice such as his to corroborate our experience of violence, but I am glad we have him as an ally in this work," Johnson wrote.

Brendan Fitzgerald, writing for the Columbia Journalism Review, remarks that "the book delivers" on its promises to be "carefully documented" and "meticulously reported," calling the book "a remarkably transparent work of nonfiction."

Jeff Baker of The Oregonian also had mixed opinions on the book, noting that it "is not a great book" while also remarking that "it is an important one."

== See also ==
- Post-assault treatment of sexual assault victims
