= Luis Jaramillo =

Luis Jaramillo may refer to:

- Luis Jaramillo (footballer)
- Luis Jaramillo (writer)
- Luis Fernando Jaramillo Correa, Colombian politician
