= Pat Tillman =

American football player and soldier (1976–2004)

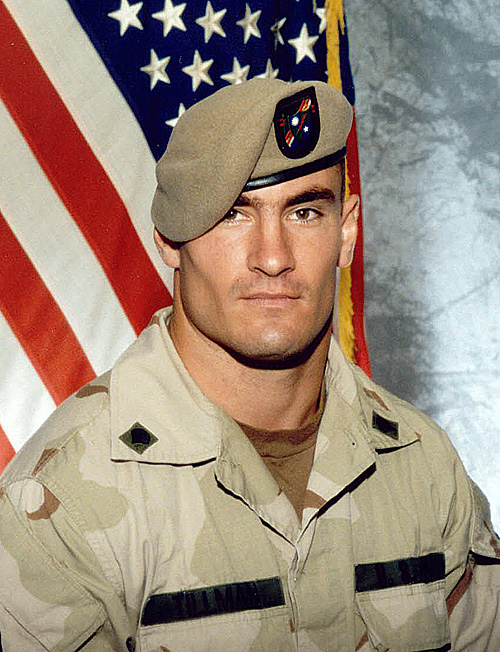
- Tillman in 2003 as a specialist
- Born: Patrick Daniel Tillman; November 6, 1976; Fremont, California, U.S.
- Died: April 22, 2004 (aged 27); Spera, Afghanistan
- Spouse: Marie Ugenti (m. 2002)
- Military career
- Allegiance: United States
- Branch: United States Army
- Service years: 2002–2004
- Rank: Corporal (posthumous)
- Nickname: "Pat"
- Units: 2nd Ranger Battalion; 75th Ranger Regiment
- Conflicts: Iraq War; War in Afghanistan †
- Awards: Silver Star; Purple Heart; Meritorious Service Medal
- Football career

No. 40
- Position: Safety

Personal information
- Listed height: 5 ft 11 in (1.80 m)
- Listed weight: 202–204 lb (92–93 kg)

Career information
- High school: Leland (San Jose, California)
- College: Arizona State (1994–1997)
- NFL draft: 1998: 7th round, 226th overall pick

Career history
- Arizona Cardinals (1998–2001)

Awards and highlights
- Arizona Cardinals Ring of Honor; Arizona Cardinals No. 40 retired; First-team All-American (1997); Pac-10 Defensive Player of the Year (1997); First-team All-Pac-10 (1997); 2× Second-team All-Pac-10 (1995, 1996); Arizona State Sun Devils No. 42 retired; East–West Shrine Bowl All-Century Team; East–West Shrine Bowl Hall of Fame (2005); Arizona Sports Hall of Fame (2018)

Career NFL statistics
- Interceptions: 3
- Total tackles: 374
- Forced fumbles: 3
- Fumble recoveries: 3
- Stats at Pro Football Reference
- College Football Hall of Fame

Patrick Daniel Tillman (November 6, 1976 – April 22, 2004) was an American professional football player for the Arizona Cardinals of the National Football League (NFL) who left his sports career and enlisted in the United States Army Special Operations in May 2002 in the aftermath of the September 11 attacks. His service in Iraq and Afghanistan, as well as his subsequent death, received significant media attention, especially when it was discovered he had been killed by friendly fire.

Tillman played college football for the Arizona State Sun Devils, earning first-team All-American honors in 1997. After four seasons in the NFL, Tillman joined the Army Rangers and served several combat tours before he was killed in the mountains of Afghanistan at the age of 27. At first, the Army reported that Tillman had been killed by enemy fire. A month later, on May 28, 2004, the Pentagon notified the Tillman family that he was actually killed by friendly fire. The family and other critics allege that the Department of Defense delayed the disclosure until weeks after Tillman's memorial service out of a desire to protect the image of the U.S. military. In 2007, the Pentagon released a report ruling Tillman's death as accidental.

Tillman was posthumously promoted from specialist to corporal. He also posthumously received the Silver Star and Purple Heart medals.

== Early life and education ==
Tillman was born on November 6, 1976, in Fremont, California, to Patrick Kevin and Mary Tillman (née Spalding). The oldest of three sons, Tillman played competitive football. He went to Bret Harte Middle School and helped lead Leland High School to the Central Coast Division I Football Championship. Tillman did not always play football. In his freshman year of high school, he was catcher for his baseball team, but did not make the varsity team. In his sophomore year he decided to concentrate on football. Tillman then went to Arizona State University on a football scholarship.

Tillman was very close to his family and high school friends. He repeatedly mentioned in his personal journals during wartime service that he drew strength from and deeply valued his closest friendships, parents, wife, and family. Tillman was very committed to his high school sweetheart, Marie Ugenti, whom he married shortly before his enlistment in the Army. He also was very close with his brother, Kevin, who enlisted with and served alongside him.

=== College years ===
He started his college career as a linebacker for Arizona State University in 1994, when he secured the last remaining scholarship for the team. Tillman excelled as a linebacker at Arizona State, despite being relatively small for the position at 5 ft 11 in (1.80 m) tall. As a junior, he helped his team go undefeated that season as well as helping them make it to the Rose Bowl that year. In 1997, he was voted the Pac-10 Defensive Player of the Year. In the same year, Tillman was also named Arizona State's MVP.

Pat Tillman majored in marketing and graduated in three and a half years with a 3.85 GPA. He also earned many academic awards including: the Clyde B. Smith Academic Award in 1996 and 1997; The Sporting News Honda Scholar-Athlete of the Year in 1997; and the 1998 Sun Angel Student Athlete of Year. He was the sole inductee of the East–West Shrine Bowl Hall of Fame in 2005 and was also selected to the East–West Shrine Bowl All-Century Team. Tillman was inducted into the College Football Hall of Fame in 2010, and the Arizona Sports Hall of Fame in 2018.

== Professional football career (1998–2002) ==
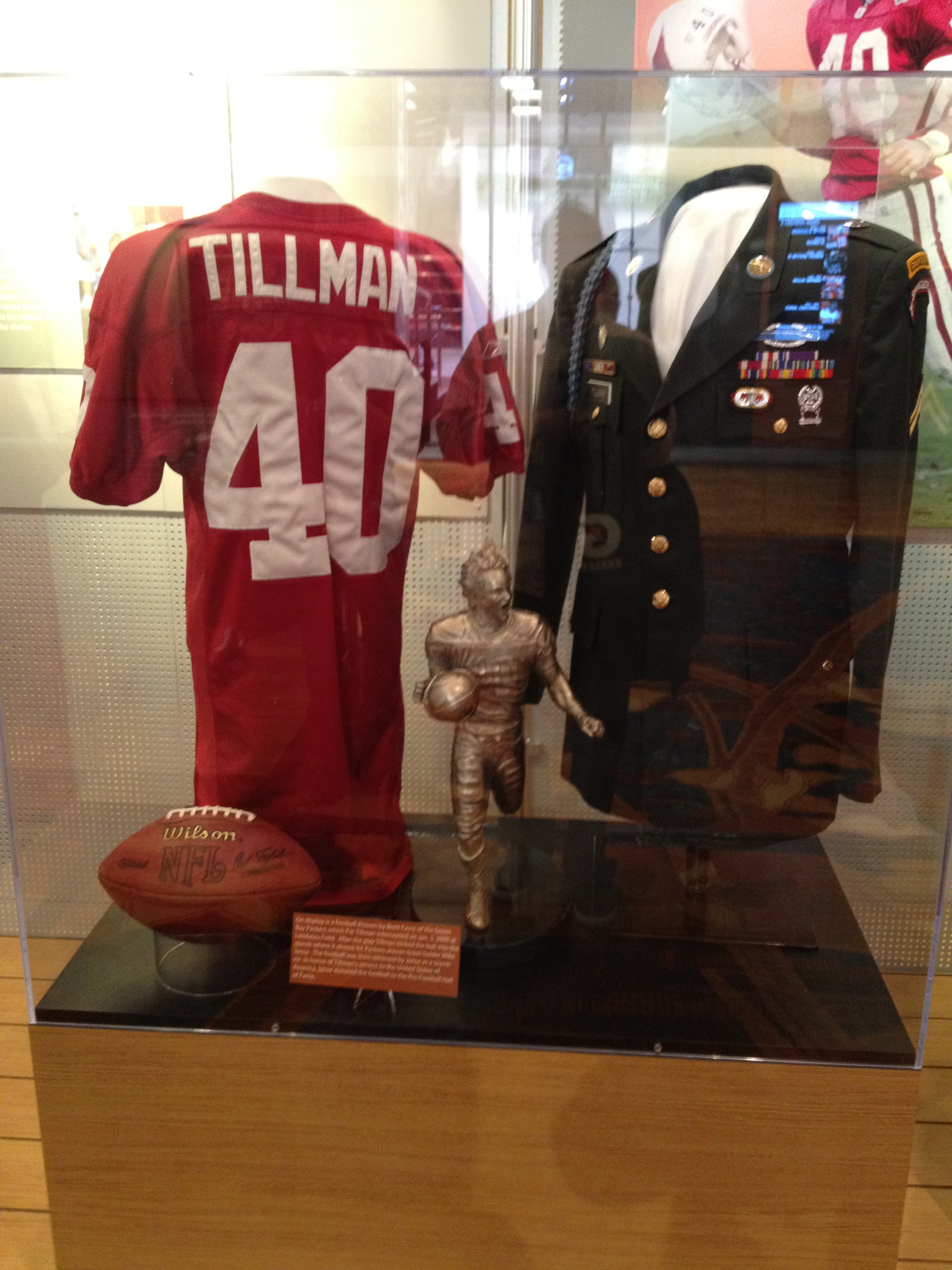
Tillman's Arizona Cardinals jersey on display alongside his military jacket and other items at the NFL Experience during Super Bowl XLVI.

In the 1998 NFL draft, Tillman was selected as the 226th pick by the Arizona Cardinals, and given a signing bonus of $21,000 (equivalent to $41,481 in 2025). Tillman moved over to play the safety position in the NFL and started ten of 16 games in his rookie season.

At one point in his NFL career, Tillman turned down a five-year, $9 million contract offer from the St. Louis Rams out of loyalty to the Cardinals.

Sports Illustrated football writer Paul Zimmerman named Tillman to his 2000 NFL All-Pro team after Tillman finished with 155 tackles (118 solo), 1.5 sacks, two forced fumbles, two fumble recoveries, nine pass deflections, and one interception for 30 yards.

Tillman finished his career with totals of 340 tackles, 2.5 sacks, three interceptions for 37 yards, three forced fumbles, 15 pass deflections, and three fumble recoveries in 60 career games. In addition, he also had 1 rush attempt for 4 yards and returned 3 kickoffs for 33 yards.

In May 2002, eight months after the September 11 attacks, and after completing the 15 remaining games of the 2001 season which followed the attacks, Tillman turned down a contract offer of $3.6 million ($6 million in 2025) over three years from the Cardinals to enlist in the U.S. Army.

=== Career statistics ===
Legend
**Bold**	Career high

==== NFL ====
===== Regular season =====
Year	Team	Games		Tackles				Interceptions						Fumbles		
Year	Team	GP	GS	Comb	Solo	Ast	Sck	Int	Yds	Avg	Lng	TD	PD	FF	FR	Yds
1998	ARI	16	10	73	46	27	1.0	0	0	0	0	0		0	0	0
1999	ARI	16	1	52	40	12	0.0	**2**	7	3.5	6	0	4	0	1	0
2000	ARI	16	16	**155**	**118**	**37**	**1.5**	1	**30**	**30.0**	**27**	0	**9**	**2**	**2**	0
2001	ARI	12	12	94	72	22	0.0	0	0	0	0	0	2	1	0	0
Career		60	39	375.4	276	98	2.5	3	37	12.3	27	0	15	3	3	0

===== Postseason =====
Year	Team	Games		Tackles				Interceptions					Fumbles		
Year	Team	GP	GS	Comb	Solo	Ast	Sck	Int	Yds	Avg	Lng	TD	FF	FR	Yds
1998	ARI	2	0	1	0	1	0.0	0	0	0	0	0	0	0	0

== U.S. Army service (2002–2004) ==
Tillman and his brother Kevin enlisted on May 31, 2002. In September 2002, they completed basic training together. The two brothers completed the Ranger Indoctrination Program in late 2002 and were assigned to the 2nd Ranger Battalion in Fort Lewis, Washington. Tillman resided in University Place with his wife before being deployed to Iraq. After participating in the invasion of Iraq as part of Operation Iraqi Freedom, in September 2003, he entered Ranger School at Fort Benning, Georgia; he graduated on November 28, 2003.

Tillman was subsequently deployed to Afghanistan, and posted at FOB Salerno.

== Death ==
On April 22, 2004, he was reported to have been killed by enemy combatants. An Afghan Militia Force allied soldier, Sayed Farhad, was also killed in the action. Tillman's platoon leader, First Lieutenant David Uthlaut, and his radiotelephone operator (RTO), 19-year-old Jade Lane, were wounded in the incident. The Army initially claimed that Tillman and his unit were attacked in an apparent ambush on a road outside of the village of Spera about 25 miles (40 km) southwest of Khost, near the Pakistan border. It was not until after his burial that investigations by the Department of Defense and U.S. Congress were launched, eventually ruling his death as having come by friendly fire.

Specialist Russell Baer, who served alongside Tillman in Iraq, claimed Tillman had told him that the Iraq War was "so fucking illegal" and that he opposed then-President George W. Bush.

An investigation by the U.S. Army Criminal Investigation Division (CID) concluded that Tillman and the Afghan militia soldier were killed by friendly fire when one part of his platoon fired upon the other in confusion, after nearby gunfire was mistakenly believed to be from enemy combatants. The CID Report summary, dated March 19, 2007, stated that:

... during their movement through the canyon road, Serial 2 [Tillman's platoon had to split up because of a broken HMMWV; the parts were called Serial 1 and 2] was ambushed and became engaged in a running gun battle with enemy combatants. Serial 1 [Tillman's portion of the platoon] had just passed through the same canyon without incident and were approximately one kilometer ahead of Serial 2. Upon hearing explosions, gunfire, and sporadic radio communication from Serial 2, Serial 1 dismounted their vehicles and moved on foot, to a more advantageous position to provide overwatch and fire support for Serial 2's movement out of the ambush. Upon exiting the gorge, and despite attempts by Serial 1 to signal a "friendly position", occupants of the lead vehicle of Serial 2 opened fire on Tillman's position, where he was fatally shot.

The Army Special Operations Command initially claimed that there was an exchange with hostile forces. After a lengthy investigation conducted by Brigadier General Gary M. Jones, the U.S. Department of Defense concluded that both the Afghan militia soldier's and Tillman's deaths were due to friendly fire aggravated by the intensity of the firefight.

Tillman's mother testified before Congress, stating "The deception surrounding this case was an insult to the family, but more importantly, its primary purpose was to deceive a whole nation."

=== Aftermath ===
==== Questions surrounding Tillman's death ====
A report described in The Washington Post on May 4, 2005, prepared at the request of Tillman's family by Brigadier General Gary M. Jones, revealed that in the days immediately following Tillman's death, Army investigators were aware that Tillman had been killed by friendly fire, shot three times in the head at less than 10 yards away, according to Army doctors. Jones reported that senior Army commanders, including General John Abizaid, knew of this fact within days of the shooting, but nevertheless approved the awarding of the Silver Star, Purple Heart, and a posthumous promotion to the rank of Corporal.

Lieutenant General Stanley McChrystal approved the Silver Star citation on April 28, 2004, which gave a detailed account of Tillman's death including the phrase "in the line of devastating enemy fire," but the next day he sent a P4 confidential memo warning senior government members that Tillman might actually have been killed by friendly fire. Senior commanders within the U.S. Central Command, including former Commander of the United States Central Command (CENTCOM) General John Abizaid, were notified by the P4 memo, which described Tillman's "highly possible" friendly fire, four days before Tillman's nationally televised memorial service during which he was lauded as a war hero for dying while engaging the enemy.

Jones reported that members of Tillman's unit burned his body armor and uniform in an apparent attempt to hide that he was killed by friendly fire. His notebook, in which, according to author Jon Krakauer, Tillman had recorded some of his thoughts on Afghanistan, was also burned, "a blatant violation of protocol." Several soldiers were punished by being removed from the United States Army Rangers. Jones believed that Tillman should retain his medals and promotion, since, according to Jones, he intended to engage the enemy and behaved heroically.

Tillman's family was not informed of the finding that he was killed by friendly fire until weeks after his memorial service, although at least some senior Army officers knew prior to the service. According to Krakauer in Where Men Win Glory, the extensive coverup that followed included the military's order that Tillman's comrades lie to his family at the funeral. Tillman's parents have sharply criticized the Army's handling of the incident. Tillman's mother believed that "this lie was to cover their image," while Tillman's father believed that the Army "purposely interfered in the investigation" because of the effect it could have on recruitment.

After it happened, all the people in positions of authority went out of their way to script this. They purposely interfered with the investigation; they covered it up. I think they thought they could control it, and they realized that their recruiting efforts were going to go to hell in a handbasket if the truth about his death got out. They blew up their poster boy.

He also blamed high-ranking Army officers for presenting "outright lies" to Tillman's family and to the public.

On March 4, 2006, the U.S. Defense Department Inspector General directed the Army to open a criminal investigation of Tillman's death. The Army's Criminal Investigative Division was to determine whether Tillman's death was the result of negligent homicide.

On March 26, 2007, the Pentagon released their report on the events surrounding Tillman's death and coverup. The report reads in part:

... we emphasize that all investigators established the basic facts of CPL Tillman's death – that it was caused by friendly fire, that the occupants of one vehicle in CPL Tillman's platoon were responsible, and that circumstances on the ground caused those occupants to misidentify friendly forces as hostile. None of the investigations suggested that CPL Tillman's death was anything other than accidental. Our review, as well as the investigation recently completed by Army CID, obtained no evidence contrary to those key findings.

Tillman's brother Kevin testified before the United States House Committee on Oversight and Government Reform that:

The deception surrounding this Tillman case was an insult to the family: but more importantly, its primary purpose was to deceive a whole nation. We say these things with disappointment and sadness for our country. Once again, we have been used as props in a Pentagon public relations exercise.

After Kevin's testimony, Pete Geren, acting secretary of the Army, stated to reporters, "We as an Army failed in our duty to the Tillman family, the duty we owe to all the families of our fallen soldiers: give them the truth, the best we know it, as fast as we can."

Tillman's diary was never returned to his family, and its whereabouts were unknown to them, according to his father.

One investigation of the autopsy report and photographs by two forensic pathologists in November 2006 concluded that Tillman was most likely killed as a result of fire from an M249 light machine gun. The M249 uses the same ammunition as the M16 rifle and M4 carbine, but is capable of higher rates of fire. This would allow a competent user to place three bullets within a several-inch target from 40 or 50 yards away, even from a moving vehicle.

On July 26, 2007, Chris Matthews reported on Hardball that Tillman's death may have been a case of deliberate murder by Tillman's fellow soldiers – specifically that the bullet holes were tight and neat, suggesting a shot at close range. Matthews based his speculation on a report from the doctors who examined Tillman's body. The following day the Associated Press reported that a doctor who examined Tillman's body after his death wrote, "The medical evidence did not match up with the scenario as described", also noting that the wound entrances appeared as though he had been shot with an M16 rifle from fewer than 10 yards (9.1 m) away. A possible motive was not identified. When officers and soldiers were asked during a criminal investigation, they said they were certain the shooting was accidental. According to one of his fellow soldiers, Tillman "was popular among his fellow soldiers and had no enemies."

In addition, in response to a Freedom of Information Act request filed by the Associated Press, the Defense Department released 2,300 pages of documents which were reported to indicate:

- There has never been evidence of enemy fire found on the scene, and no members of Tillman's group had been hit by enemy fire.
- Lt General Philip Kensinger, the three-star general who withheld details of Tillman's death from his parents for a number of months, told investigators approximately 70 times that he had a bad memory and could not recall details of his actions; Kensinger was ultimately censured by the Army for misleading investigators.
- Army attorneys sent each other congratulatory e-mails for keeping criminal investigators at bay as the Army conducted an internal friendly-fire investigation that resulted in administrative, or non-criminal, punishments.
- Army doctors told the investigators that Tillman's wounds suggested murder because "the medical evidence did not match-up with the scenario as described."

==== Congressional inquiries ====
On April 24, 2007, Specialist Bryan O'Neal, the last soldier known to see Pat Tillman alive, testified before the House Committee on Oversight and Government Reform that his superiors warned him not to divulge information that a fellow soldier killed Tillman, especially to the Tillman family. Later, Pat Tillman's brother, Kevin Tillman, who was also in the convoy traveling behind his brother at the time of the 2004 incident in Afghanistan but did not witness it, testified that the military tried to spin his brother's death to deflect attention from emerging failings in the Afghan war.

On July 13, 2007, Henry Waxman and Tom Davis, the leading members of the House Committee on Oversight and Government Reform, revealed that the Bush administration and the Pentagon had withheld key documents relating to Tillman's death and denied any new document release request from Congress citing executive privilege.

On August 13, 2007, the Associated Press reported that on behalf of VoteVets, 20 U.S. military veterans who fought in Iraq and Afghanistan asked the NFL commissioner, Roger Goodell, to help secure the release of all documents relating to the death of Pat Tillman.

On July 14, 2008, the House Committee on Oversight and Government Reform released a proposed report titled "Misleading Information from the Battlefield: The Tillman and Lynch Episodes". The committee stated that its "investigation was frustrated by a near universal lack of recall" among "senior officials at the White House" and the military. It concluded:

The pervasive lack of recollection and absence of specific information makes it impossible for the Committee to assign responsibility for the misinformation in Specialist Tillman's and Private Lynch's cases. It is clear, however, that the Defense Department did not meet its most basic obligations in sharing accurate information with the families and with the American public.

== Legacy ==
=== Memorials and tributes ===
After his death, family and friends of Tillman including his widow Marie Tillman established the Pat Tillman Foundation to carry forward Tillman's legacy by inspiring and supporting those striving for positive change in themselves and the world. Marie would serve as executive director and then chair of the board.

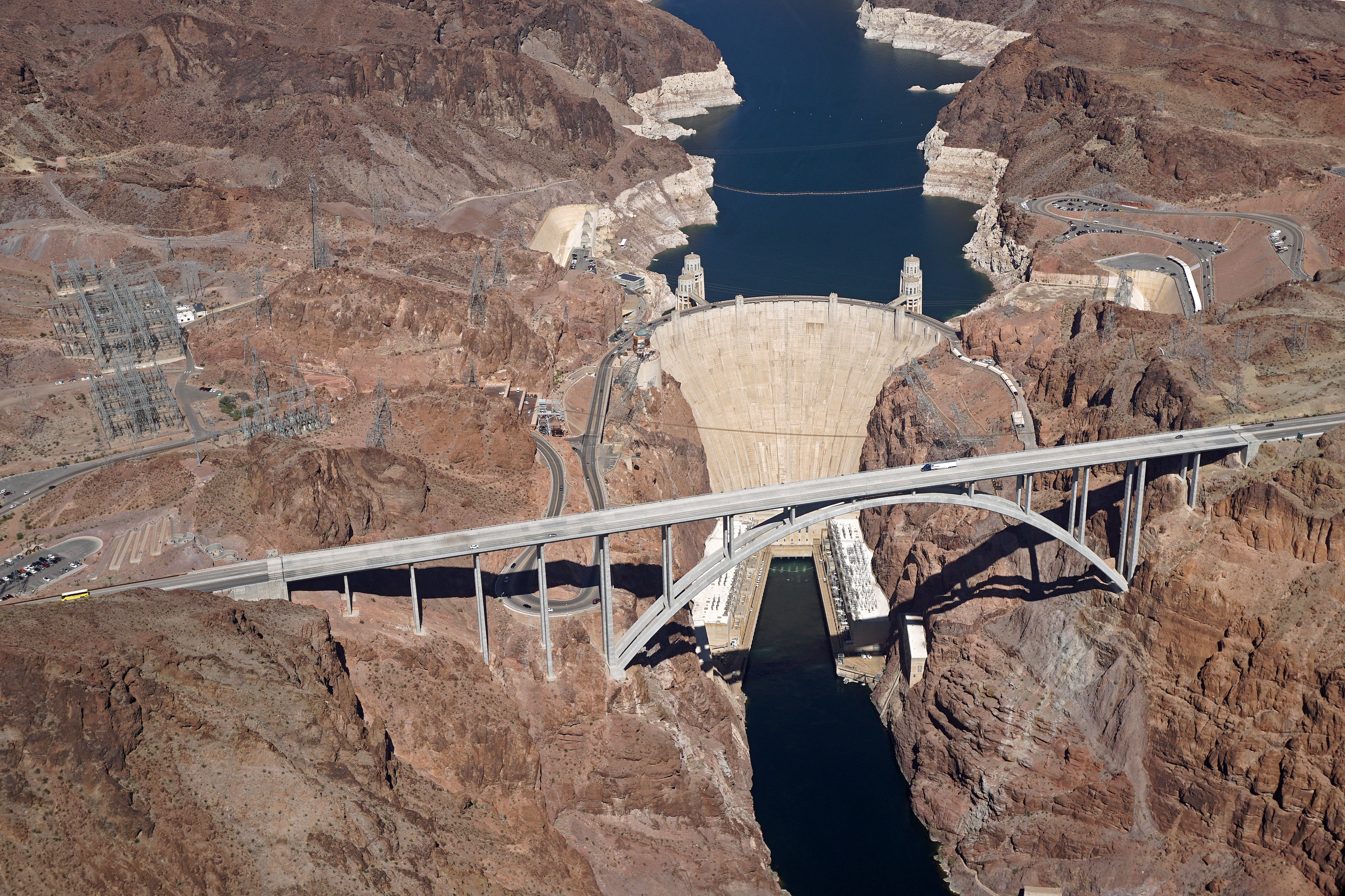
Mike O'Callaghan–Pat Tillman Memorial Bridge

A highway bypass around the Hoover Dam has a bridge bearing Tillman's name. Completed in October 2010, the Mike O'Callaghan–Pat Tillman Memorial Bridge spans the Colorado River between Nevada and Arizona.

Lincoln Law School of San Jose has established the Pat Tillman Scholarship in honor of Tillman. Tillman's father earned his Juris Doctor from Lincoln in 1983.

On Sunday, September 19, 2004, all teams of the NFL wore a memorial decal on their helmets in honor of Tillman. The Arizona Cardinals continued to wear this decal throughout the 2004 season. Former Cardinals quarterback Jake Plummer requested to also wear the decal for the entire season, but the NFL turned him down, saying his helmet would not be uniform with the rest of the Denver Broncos. Plummer later grew a full beard and his hair long in honor of Tillman, who had such a style in the NFL before cutting his hair and shaving his beard off to fit military uniform guidelines.

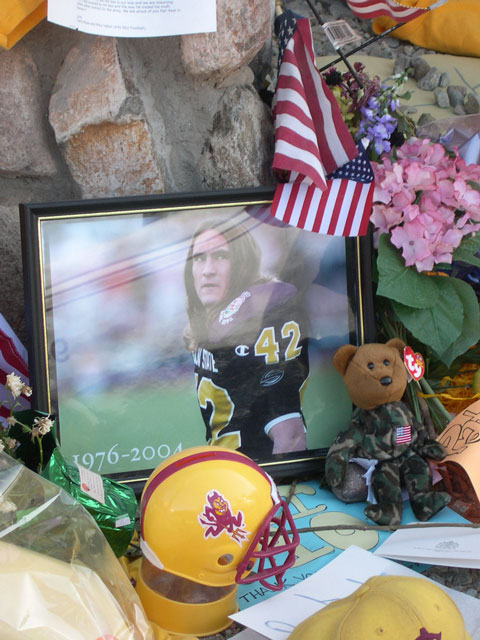
A memorial to Tillman was created at Sun Devil Stadium, where he played football for the Sun Devils and the Cardinals.

The Cardinals retired his number 40, and Arizona State did the same for the number 42 he wore with the Sun Devils. The Cardinals have named the plaza surrounding their State Farm Stadium in Glendale Pat Tillman Freedom Plaza. Later, on November 12, 2006, during a Cardinals game versus the Cowboys, a bronze statue was revealed in his honor. ASU also named the football locker room entryway to Sun Devil Stadium the "Pat Tillman Memorial Tunnel" and made a "PT-42" patch that they place on the neck of their uniforms as a permanent feature. In 2011, Pat Tillman Veteran's Center in the lower level of the Memorial Union opened on the Tempe campus. Before the 2013 season, the Tillman Tunnel was renovated with new graphics and signage. Double doors separate the locker room from the tunnel, and a television with a sound system displays Tillman's career highlights. The gate which opens to the field features an image of Pat Tillman facing the field, looking as if he is leading the team out.

On Saturday, April 15, 2005, 5,000 participants turned out for the inaugural Pat's Run (which has become the annual fundraising event for the Pat Tillman Foundation) in Tempe. The racers traveled along the 4.2-mile (6.8 km) course around Tempe Town Lake to the finish line, on the 42-yard line of Sun Devil Stadium in order to commemorate the number which Tillman wore as a Sun Devil and which was later retired in his honor. A second race took place in San Jose. Sponsored by the Pat Tillman Foundation, Pat's Run has continued to grow every year, with more than 28,000 attendees in April 2019. Various "honor runs", in locations such as Austin, Texas, take place around the country at the same time as Pat's Run and are supported by Arizona State University's Alumni Association.

In 2004, the NFL donated $250,000 to the United Service Organizations to build a USO center in memory of Tillman. The Pat Tillman USO Center, the first USO center in Afghanistan, opened on Bagram Air Base on April 1, 2005. As of 2019, the NFL continues to support the Pat Tillman Foundation through its Salute to Service campaign honoring United States military service members along with other military and veteran nonprofits.

The song "World Wide Suicide" by Pearl Jam, released March 14, 2006, was written largely about Tillman.

The Pacific-10 Conference renamed its annual defensive player-of-the-year award in football to the Pat Tillman Defensive Player of the Year.

Forward Operating Base Tillman was close to the Pakistan border, near the village of Lwara in Paktika Province, Afghanistan.

Tillman's high school, Leland High School in San Jose, renamed its football field after him. In New Almaden, an unincorporated community adjacent to San Jose, where Tillman grew up, a memorial was constructed near the Almaden Quicksilver County Park. This memorial was dedicated in September 2007 during the annual New Almaden Day celebration. In Phoenix, the Balsz School District named a middle school in 2018 after Tillman.

The skateboarding bulldog featured on YouTube and in an Apple iPhone commercial was named after Tillman.

External videos
- After Words interview with Mary Tillman on Boots on the Ground by Dusk, May 31, 2008, C-SPAN
- After Words interview with Krakauer on Where Men Win Glory, September 19, 2009, C-SPAN

Two books about Tillman were published in 2009. Jon Krakauer, author of Into Thin Air and Into the Wild, chronicles Tillman's story in Where Men Win Glory: The Odyssey of Pat Tillman, published by Doubleday on September 15. Meanwhile, Tillman's mother, Mary Tillman, also wrote a book about her son, Boots on the Ground by Dusk, which was released in April 2008.

Following Tillman's death, Ohio State Linebackers consisting of A. J. Hawk, Bobby Carpenter, and Anthony Schlegel, as well as center Nick Mangold, grew their hair in tribute, imitating Tillman's trademark locks.

In September 2008, Rory Fanning, a fellow Army Ranger who was stationed with Tillman in Fort Lewis, Washington, began his "Walk for Pat", a walk across the United States in an effort to raise money and awareness for the Pat Tillman Foundation. The stated fundraising goal is $3.6 million, the value of the contract Tillman turned down when he decided to enlist in the military.

The Arizona State University Sun Devils football team wore special uniforms made by Adidas to honor Tillman and his career on October 29, 2015, when they faced the Oregon Ducks. All proceeds from the uniforms went to the Pat Tillman Foundation.

Super Bowl LVII, which was played in Arizona where he played collegiately and professionally, was dedicated to Tillman. Four Tillman Foundation Scholars performed the ceremonial coin toss.

=== Criticisms ===
After reports of Tillman's anti-war views became public, Ted Rall, who had previously written a comic calling Tillman a "fool" and "idiot", said that he was wrong to have assumed Tillman to be a "right wing poster child" when Tillman regarded the invasion of Iraq as illegal.

Then-Lieutenant Colonel Ralph Kauzlarich, Regimental Executive Officer at Forward Operating Base Salerno on Khost, Afghanistan, under which Tillman was serving at the time of his death, and led the second investigation into Tillman's death, made statements about the Tillman family's search for the truth based on Tillman's atheism. In comments to ESPN, Kauzlarich said: "These people have a hard time letting it go. It may be because of their religious beliefs" and "When you die, I mean, there is supposedly a better life, right? Well, if you are an atheist and you don't believe in anything, if you die, what is there to go to? Nothing. You are worm dirt. So for their son to die for nothing and now he is no more ... I do not know how an atheist thinks, I can only imagine that would be pretty tough."

Kauzlarich conducted the second investigation into Tillman's death which lasted a week, from May 8 to 15, 2004. Brigadier General Rodney Johnson, the Commanding General of the United States Army Criminal Investigations Command, testified before Congress that he found these statements "totally unacceptable". Acting Department of Defense Inspector General Thomas Gimble also testified that he was "shocked" that Lieutenant Colonel Kauzlarich would make these statements. According to AP analysis, three lower-level officers are expected to be punished, and Kauzlarich may be one of the three. Tillman's mother continues to reject the Pentagon's characterization of the officers' offenses as "errors" in reporting Tillman's death, because several officers have said they made conscious decisions not to tell the Tillman family that friendly fire was suspected.

=== Media analyses ===
Reviews by The New York Times reporter Dexter Filkins of Jon Krakauer's book Where Men Win Glory: The Odyssey of Pat Tillman noted that the book did well to compile the facts and "nauseating" details regarding the coverup of Tillman's death. "After Tillman's death, Army commanders violated many of their own rules, not to mention elementary standards of decency, to turn the killing into a propaganda coup for the American side," Filkins wrote.

A documentary film, The Tillman Story, was shown at the Sundance Film Festival on January 23, 2010, and was released in August 2010.

On October 19, 2006, Kevin Tillman broke his silence about his brother's death, lashing out at the Iraq War (and American foreign policy in general) in a 660-word essay published on Truthdig, a progressive online journal of news and opinion. The essay was widely distributed and was cited in The New York Times and Associated Press.

== Personal life ==
Tillman was an atheist. According to speakers at his funeral, he was very well-read, having read a number of religious texts including the Bible, Quran, and the Book of Mormon, as well as transcendentalist authors such as Ralph Waldo Emerson and Henry David Thoreau. However, responding to religious overtones at the funeral by Maria Shriver and John McCain, his youngest brother, Richard, said, "Just make no mistake, he'd want me to say this: He's not with God, he's fucking dead, he's not religious." Richard added, "Thanks for your thoughts, but he's fuckin' dead." Another article quotes Tillman as having told then-general manager of the Seattle Seahawks, Bob Ferguson, in December 2003, "You know I'm not religious."

The September 25, 2005, edition of the San Francisco Chronicle newspaper reported that Tillman held views which were critical of the Iraq War. According to Tillman's mother, a friend of Tillman had arranged a meeting for Tillman with author Noam Chomsky, a prominent critic of American foreign and military policy, to take place after his return from Afghanistan.

In 2025, his youngest brother Richard Tillman was arrested for an arson attack on a post office in San Jose, California. In 2026, a judge sentenced him to 60 months in prison. At the sentencing hearing, Tillman stated that "Pat, by the way, is me" and "Pat Tillman’s little brother says he is the second coming and it is barely in the news."

== Awards and decorations ==
=== Silver Star Citation ===
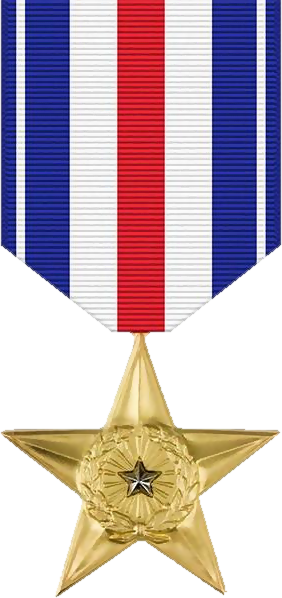

Citation:

The President of the United States of America, authorized by Act of Congress July 9, 1918 (amended by an act of July 25, 1963), takes pride in presenting the Silver Star (Posthumously) to Corporal Patrick D. Tillman, United States Army, for gallantry in action while serving with the 2nd Battalion, 75th Ranger Regiment, during action in Afghanistan on 22 April 2004, against an armed enemy while serving as a Rifle Team Leader in support of Operation ENDURING FREEDOM. Caught between the crossfire of an enemy near ambush, Corporal Tillman put himself in the line of devastating enemy fire as he maneuvered his fire team to a covered position from which they could effectively employ their weapons on known enemy positions. His audacious leadership and courageous example under fire inspired his men to fight at great risk to their own personal safety, resulting in the enemy's withdrawal, his platoon's safe passage from the ambush kill zone, and his mortal wound. Corporal Tillman's personal courage, tactical expertise, and professional competence directly contributed to his platoon's overall success and survival. In making the ultimate sacrifice for his team and platoon, Corporal Patrick D. Tillman reflected great credit upon himself, the Joint Task Force, and the United States Army.

=== Awards ===
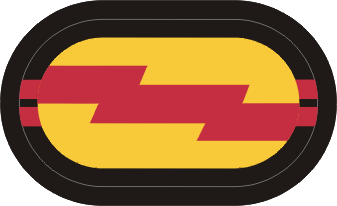
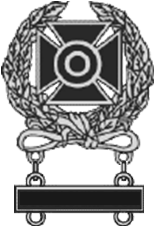

Badge	Combat Infantryman Badge		
1st row	Silver Star		Purple Heart
2nd row	Meritorious Service Medal	Army Achievement Medal	National Defense Service Medal
3rd row	Global War on Terrorism Expeditionary Medal	Global War on Terrorism Service Medal	Army Service Ribbon
Badges	Parachutist Badge with 2nd Ranger Battalion trimming		Expert Marksmanship badge with rifle component bar
badges	2nd Ranger Battalion; Combat Service Identification Badge	75th Ranger Regiment; Distinctive unit insignia	Ranger Tab
Unit citations	Army Presidential Unit Citation with 1 Oak leaf cluster	Joint Meritorious Unit Award	Army Superior Unit Award with 2 Oak leaf clusters

In addition to his military awards, Tillman received the Arthur Ashe Courage Award from ESPN in 2003, as part of that year's ESPY Awards ceremony.

== See also ==
- A Second Knock at the Door
