= Under the Banner of Heaven =

2003 book by Jon Krakauer

- Author: Jon Krakauer
- Language: English
- Subject: LDS Church
- Genre: Nonfiction
- Publication date: July 2003
- Publication place: United States
- Media type: Print
- ISBN: 1-4000-3280-6
- OCLC: 842901458
- Preceded by: Into Thin Air
- Followed by: Where Men Win Glory

Under the Banner of Heaven: A Story of Violent Faith is a nonfiction book by author Jon Krakauer, first published in July 2003. He investigated and juxtaposed two histories: the origin and evolution of The Church of Jesus Christ of Latter-day Saints (LDS Church) and a modern double murder committed in the name of God by brothers Ron and Dan Lafferty, who subscribed to a fundamentalist version of Mormonism.

The Laffertys were formerly members of a very small splinter group called the School of Prophets, led by Robert C. Crossfield (also known by his prophet name Onias). The group accepts many beliefs of the original LDS church at the time when it ceased the practice of polygamy in the 1890s, but it does not identify with those who call themselves fundamentalist Mormons. The book examines the ideologies of both the LDS Church and the fundamentalist Mormon polygamous groups, such as the Fundamentalist Church of Jesus Christ of Latter-Day Saints (FLDS Church).

The book was adapted as a limited series of the same name that began airing in April 2022 on FX on Hulu.

== Synopsis ==
=== Murders ===
The book opens with news accounts of the 1984 murder of Brenda Lafferty and her infant daughter Erica. Brenda was married to Allen Lafferty, the youngest of the Lafferty brothers. His older brothers Dan and Ron disapproved of their sister-in-law Brenda because they believed she was the reason Dan's wife left him (after refusing to allow him to marry a plural/second wife—his stepdaughters). Both men's extremism reached new heights when they became members of the School of the Prophets, founded and led by Robert C. Crossfield. After joining this group, Ron claimed that God had sent him revelations about Brenda. Communication with God is a core belief of fundamentalist Mormonism, as well as the mainstream LDS Church. Ron showed the members of the School of Prophets a written "removal revelation" that allegedly called for the killing of Brenda and her baby. After other members of the School failed to honor Ron's removal revelation, the brothers quit the School.

Dan claimed that he slit both of the victims' throats. But, at the 2001 trial, Chip Carnes, who was riding in the getaway car, testified that Ron said that he had killed Brenda, and that Ron had thanked his brother for "doing the baby".

After the murders, the police found the written "revelation" concerning Brenda and Erica. The press widely reported that Ron had received a revelation to kill the mother and child. Afterward, the Lafferty brothers conducted a recorded press conference at which Ron said that the "revelation" was not addressed to him, but to "Todd" [a drifter whom Ron had befriended while working in Wichita] and that the revelation called only for "removal" of Brenda and her baby, and did not use the word "kill". The jury at Ron's trial was shown these remarks of Ron denying he had received a revelation to kill Brenda and Erica.

=== The Church of Jesus Christ of Latter-day Saints history ===
After opening with the Lafferty case, Krakauer explores the history of Mormonism, starting with the early life of Joseph Smith, founder and first prophet of the Latter Day Saint movement. He follows his life from a criminal fraud trial to leading the first followers to Jackson County, Missouri, and Nauvoo, Illinois. While violence seemed to accompany the Mormons, Krakauer notes that they did not necessarily initiate it. Early Mormons faced religious persecution from mainstream Protestant Christians, due to their unorthodox beliefs, including polygamy and ongoing revelation from God through living prophets. In addition they tended to conduct business and personal relations only with other members of their community. There were violent clashes between Mormons and non-Mormons, culminating in Smith's death on June 27, 1844, when a mob shot him after attacking him in Carthage Jail, where he was awaiting trial for inciting a riot after ordering, as Nauvoo's mayor, in conjunction with the City Council, the destruction of the printing press of the Nauvoo Expositor, a local publication which had been declared a public nuisance.

From Nauvoo, the Mormons trekked westward to modern-day Utah, led by Smith's successor Brigham Young (after some controversy). Arriving in what they called Deseret, many Mormons believed they would be left alone by the United States government, as the territory was then part of Mexico. Soon after their arrival, the Mexican–American War occurred, with Mexico's eventual defeat. Under the Treaty of Guadalupe Hidalgo signed on February 2, 1848, this land and the rest of what would become the American Southwest were ceded to the United States.

Smith's highly controversial revelation of plural marriage threatened to split apart followers of the faith. The Utah Territory was a theodemocracy led by Brigham Young as Governor, where polygamy continued to be practiced for 43 years. Finally, on September 23, 1890, Wilford Woodruff, the fourth president of the Church, claimed to have received a revelation from God (known as the 1890 Manifesto) which officially banned polygamy. Six years later, Utah was granted statehood.

After the Manifesto, some members broke away from the mainstream church to form what eventually became the FLDS Church, the most popular group of fundamentalist Mormonism. The FLDS Church continues to encourage polygamy, as do some other breakaway groups.

=== Comparisons ===
Krakauer examines events in Latter Day Saint history and compares them to modern-day FLDS doctrine (and other minority versions of Mormonism, such as the Crossfield School of the Prophets). He examines the 1857 Mountain Meadows massacre during the Utah War, in which Mormons and some local Paiute Indians rounded up and murdered approximately 120 members of the Baker–Fancher party of emigrants passing through their territory. These early Mormons went to great lengths to conceal their part in the massacre (including dressing as the Paiute and painting their faces in similar fashion). The Civil War interrupted investigations of the events, and no one was indicted until 1874, when nine men were charged. For nearly two decades the falsehood held that the massacre was due solely to the Paiute. The only person ever convicted in the affair was John D. Lee, a former member of the LDS Church. He was convicted and executed by the state in 1877 for his role in the crime.

Krakauer cites information gleaned from several interviews with Dan Lafferty and former and current members of the Crossfield School of the Prophets, as well as other fundamentalist Mormons. He refers to several histories about the formation of Mormonism to tie the origins of the religion to the modern iterations of both the church and the fundamentalists.

== Derivation of the title ==
The title of the book is drawn from an 1880 address by John Taylor, the third president of the LDS Church, defending the practice of plural marriage:

God is greater than the United States, and when the Government conflicts with heaven, we will be ranged under the banner of heaven against the Government. The United States says we cannot marry more than one wife. God says different.

== Reception ==
Charles Graeber of The Guardian listed the book in his top ten true crime books, and described Krakauer as "a master journalist and storyteller who is unfettered and unafraid of the true crime mantle. [He] pries open the golden doors to one of the newest and fastest-growing religions in America to set the stage for the non-fiction drama."

In advance of the book's release in 2003, Richard E. Turley, managing director of the Church History Department of the LDS Church, argued that the book contained historical errors and incorrect assertions, and showed "unfamiliarity with basic aspects" of the Church's history, theology and administrative structure, and criticized the work for lacking a "scientific methodology". He accused Krakauer of "condemn[ing] religion generally". In his 2004 paperback edition of the book, Krakauer responded to these allegations, noting that Turley's pre-emptive "response" preceded the book's release, and claimed that LDS leaders had explicitly advocated the whitewashing of LDS history, amongst other points.

Mike Otterson, managing director of public affairs for the LDS Church, condemned Krakauer's example of religious "zealots" to draw conclusions about all Mormons and any propensity for violence. Otterson said that, after reading the book, "One could be forgiven for concluding that every Latter-day Saint, including your friendly Mormon neighbor, has a tendency to violence. And so Krakauer unwittingly puts himself in the same camp as those who believe every German is a Nazi, every Japanese a fanatic, and every Arab a terrorist."

== Television adaptation ==
In July 2011, Warner Bros. purchased the film rights to the book, with Ron Howard directing and Dustin Lance Black writing the screenplay. In June 2021, it was announced that the book was being redeveloped as a limited series for FX, with Black still attached as writer, David Mackenzie serving as director, and Andrew Garfield, Gil Birmingham and Daisy Edgar-Jones to star. The series debuted in April 2022 on FX on Hulu.

== Related documentary ==
In 2015, Amy Berg released her independent documentary, Prophet's Prey, about fundamentalist Mormons practicing polygamy, based on the case of Warren Jeffs, sentenced to life for polygamy and abuse of minors. Krakauer participated in this film and appears on camera, as he continued his own investigation of sects that practiced polygamy. Ron Howard and Brian Grazer, both working on the television adaptation of the book as producers, were also executive producers of the documentary.
