= Classic Krakauer: Essays on Wilderness and Risk =

Book by Jon Krakauer

- Hardcover edition
- Author: Jon Krakauer
- Language: English
- Subject: Collection of essays
- Genre: Non-fiction
- Publisher: Anchor Books
- Publication date: October 29, 2019
- Publication place: United States
- Media type: print, e-book
- Pages: 192 pp.
- ISBN: 978-1984897695
- Preceded by: Missoula

Classic Krakauer: Essays on Wilderness and Risk is a collection of ten essays by American writer and mountaineer Jon Krakauer. Published in 2019 by Anchor Books, the book brings together feature articles originally written for magazines such as The New Yorker, Outside, and Smithsonian between 1995 and 2014. The collection explores themes of human daring, adventure, disaster, and the complex relationship between people and untamed natural environments.

== Background ==
Following the success of his full-length works such as Into the Wild (1996) and Into Thin Air (1997), Classic Krakauer compiles shorter pieces that originally appeared in magazines. In the book's introduction, Krakauer notes that "most of the short pieces I wrote during the years between Eiger Dreams and Into Thin Air vanished into the crevices of time and have been forgotten," expressing appreciation that the publisher chose to retrieve and reprint a selection of these articles.

== Reception ==
A review by Publishers Weekly stated: "Krakauer takes the reader along on journeys that are alternately thrilling and terrifying, via direct yet illustrative prose, as when he describes how a daring surfer “carves a tight, elegant arc as the wave curls over and tries to swallow him—a roaring, spinning tornado, spewing foam, bearing down fast on the blind side." Jennifer Forker of Associated Press wrote: "This reader sought additional information — about professional surfer Mark Foo, Mount Rainier and the Cascade Range, and the Khumbu Icefall on Mount Everest in the Himalayas — after reading various chapters, each an essay. Krakauer regaled with a scientific trio’s exploration of Lechuguilla Cave in Carlsbad Caverns National Park, New Mexico — reading about the long, roped descent into the cave’s dark maw, its miles of narrow passageways and the objects of study, rock-eating microbes."

Kirkus Reviews praised the collection, noting that the majority feature "awe-inspiring locales that are enlivened by the author's naturalist eye" and that "robust action and suspenseful pacing enhance careful explorations of power and innovation."
