= Boundary Range =

Mountain range in British Columbia, Canada

- Boundary Mountains
- Location within Alaska Location within British Columbia

Highest point
- Coordinates: 57°05′N 131°51′W

Dimensions
- Area: 114 km^{2} (44 mi^{2})

Geography
- Countries: Canada and United States
- Provinces/States: British Columbia and Alaska
- Parent range: Boundary Ranges

The Boundary Range, formerly known as the Boundary Mountains, is a subrange of the similarly named but much larger Boundary Ranges which run most of the length of the border between British Columbia, Canada, and Alaska, United States. The range lies west of the lower Stikine River between the Mud (S) and Flood Glaciers (N).

== See also ==
- Stikine, British Columbia (a.k.a. "Boundary")
- Coast Mountains
- Stikine Icecap
