= Michael Otterson =

Australian journalist and Mormon leader

Michael R. Otterson was the managing director of Public Affairs for the Church of Jesus Christ of Latter-day Saints (LDS Church) from 2008 to 2016. In April 2016, the church announced that he would retire at the end of August 2016 and be replaced by Richard E. Turley, Jr. On 1 November 2016, he began a new assignment, along with his wife, as president and matron of the London England Temple.

== Biography ==
Otterson is a convert to the LDS Church. Born in Liverpool, England and educated in Britain, he entered journalism in his native city of Liverpool before moving to Australia where he worked as a political reporter and sub-editor in South Australia and Canberra. Following a year's stint as a sub-editor on the Japan Times in Tokyo, he returned to the UK and was appointed Business Editor for the Liverpool Daily Post.

In 1976 he left journalism to manage the London public affairs office of the LDS Church, which was then the only such office outside of the United States. He remained there until 1979 as Public Relations director for the LDS Church in the United Kingdom, when the church invited him to move back to Australia to open a new public affairs office in Sydney. He remained in that post for 12 years before moving to the United States in 1991 to manage the worldwide training program for church public affairs operations. He managed the church's news media relations from 1997 to 2008, when he became managing director of LDS public affairs. Otterson has served twice as a stake president – in Liverpool and in Sydney.

== Statements ==
In 2003 Otterson responded to a Newsweek article about the LDS Church, taking issue with its characterisation of the LDS Church as acting on superficial instead of deeply held beliefs. In 2003, Otterson was also the LDS Church's main point man in its response to Jon Krakauer's book on Mormonism, Under the Banner of Heaven.

In 2005 Otterson downplayed John M. Haddow's attempt to make the exclusion of Mormons from the National Prayer Breakfast connected with the National Day of Prayer into an issue of concern.

He was engaged as early as 2006 in positioning the church as politically neutral in relation to Mitt Romney running for president and once wrote an article in which he argued that Romney's religion should be a non-issue. He also was very vocal in stating that the LDS Church would give no institutional support to Romney.

In 2008 Otterson confirmed that Proposition 8 was one of the initiatives the LDS Church had been most heavily involved in.

In late 2009 Otterson gained national attention by making an official statement for the LDS Church in the Salt Lake City Council meeting in favour of city ordinances that included sexual orientation and gender identity among categories covered in fair housing and fair employment regulations. A year later, on 12 October 2010, he delivered an official statement for the church on bullying of gay young men.

Otterson has a regular blog published by The Washington Post on Mormon-related issues. Among topics he has addressed is the 2011 The Book of Mormon musical on Broadway.

== Writings ==
Besides periodical columns and various articles, Otterson is the author of Finding Your Family on the Internet: The Ultimate Guide to Online Family History Research (ISBN 1933317442).
