= Kates Needle =

Mountain in Canada and the United States

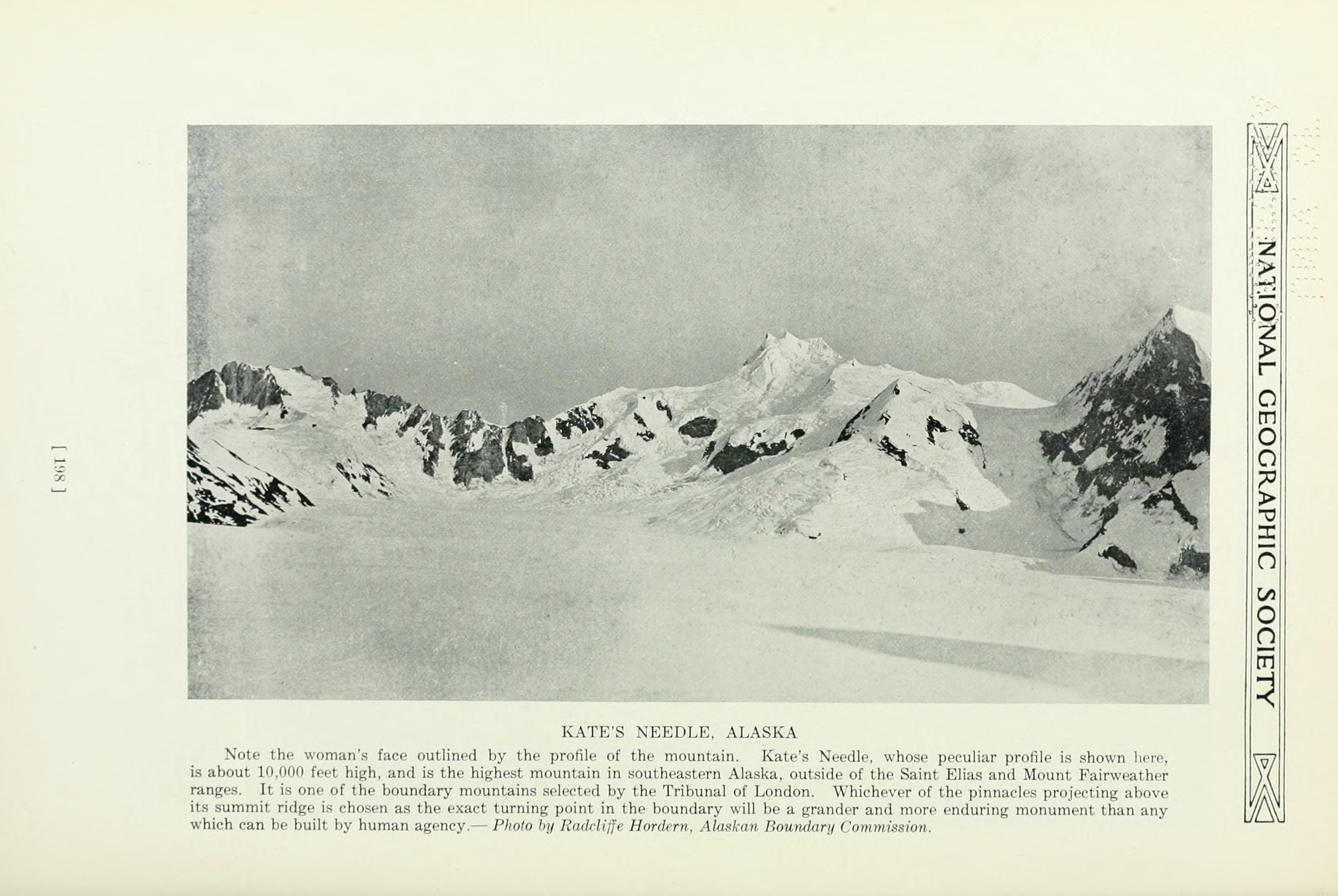
- Northwest aspect

Highest point
- Elevation: 3,053 m (10,016 ft) NGVD 29
- Prominence: 4,504 ft (1,373 m)
- Listing: Mountains of Alaska; Mountains of British Columbia; Canada highest major peaks 65th
- Coordinates: 57°02′42″N 132°02′42″W

Geography
- Location: Southeastern Alaska, U.S. and northwestern British Columbia, Canada
- Parent range: Stikine Icecap/Boundary Ranges
- Topo map(s): NTS 104F1 Dominion Mountain; USGS Sumdum A-1

Kates Needle is a mountain in the Stikine Icecap region of the Alaska-British Columbia border west of the junction of the Stikine River and Porcupine River. The summit has also been known as Boundary Peak 70.
