= A Second Knock at the Door =

- Directed by: Christopher Grimes
- Release date: 2011

A Second Knock at the Door is a documentary on friendly fire in Iraq and Afghanistan. The film follows military families after they are told their family member died in a "fratricide" incident. All the families profiled in the film only learned their family member was killed by a comrade, not an enemy, months after they first learned of their death.

Director Christopher Grimes has described being inspired by the alleged coverup of former sport star Pat Tillman being killed by his comrades.

The film was screened at the Flyway Film Festival in 2011, and the East Lansing Film Festival in 2012.
