= Where Men Win Glory =

2009 book by Jon Krakauer

Where Men Win Glory: The Odyssey of Pat Tillman
- Hardcover edition
- Author: Jon Krakauer
- Cover artist: Ed Darack
- Language: English
- Subject: Pat Tillman
- Genre: Biography
- Publisher: Knopf Doubleday Publishing Group
- Publication date: September 15, 2009
- Publication place: United States
- Media type: Print (hardcover)
- Pages: 416 pp.
- ISBN: 0-385-52226-6
- OCLC: 230729837
- Dewey Decimal: 796.332029
- LC Class: GV939.T49K73 2008
- Preceded by: Under the Banner of Heaven
- Followed by: Three Cups of Deceit

Where Men Win Glory: The Odyssey of Pat Tillman, a 2009 book written by Jon Krakauer, is a biography of Pat Tillman, an American football player who left his professional career and enlisted in the United States Army after the September 11 attacks. He was killed in 2004 in the US war in Afghanistan by friendly fire, an incident which the US government attempted to cover up. To write the book, Krakauer drew heavily upon Tillman's journals, interviews with the Tillman family, Boots On the Ground by Dusk: My Tribute to Pat Tillman by Mary Tillman, and extensive research on the ground in Afghanistan.

== Critical response ==
Many media reviews praised Krakauer's investigative work. In the Sunday Oregonian, John Strawn said the book was "nuanced, thorough and chilling."

In The Los Angeles Times, Dan Neil called the book a "beautiful piece of reporting" and "the definitive version of events surrounding Tillman's death."

Andrew Exum took issue with Krakauer's work in The Washington Post, saying he focused too much on discrediting the Bush administration and particularly Gen. Stanley McChrystal. But Post ombudsman Andrew Alexander took issue with the publication's omission that Exum had served as an unpaid advisor to McChrystal, and the online version of Exum's review was updated with a correction stating that the newspaper should have disclosed the relationship.

While at a Sundance screening of the documentary film The Tillman Story (2010), Tillman's youngest brother Richard was asked about Krakauer's book. His response about the author was "that guy's a piece of ..." The Pat Tillman Foundation, though, included Krakauer as one of the interviewees in a series honoring the 20th anniversary of Tillman's death.
