= Mount Burkett =

Mountain in Alaska, United States

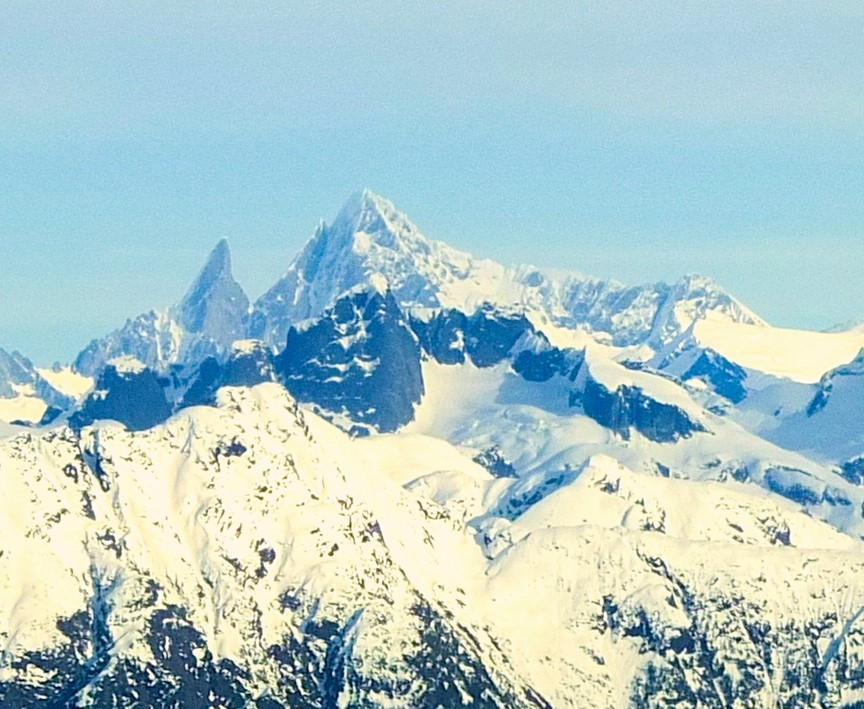
- Southwest aspect of Mount Burkett and Burkett Needle in the distance.

Highest point
- Elevation: 9,730 ft (2,966 m)
- Prominence: 3,661 ft (1,116 m)
- Parent peak: Kates Needle
- Isolation: 13.09 mi (21.07 km)
- Coordinates: 57°10′23″N 132°18′05″W

Naming
- Etymology: Lt. Eugene Field Burkett

Geography
- Location within Alaska
- Interactive map of Mount Burkett
- Country: United States
- State: Alaska
- Borough: Petersburg
- Protected area: Tongass National Forest
- Parent range: Coast Mountains; Boundary Ranges
- Topo map: USGS Sumdum A-1

Geology
- Rock age: Eocene
- Rock type: Granodiorite

Climbing
- First ascent: 1965

Mount Burkett is a 9,730-foot-elevation (2,966-meter) mountain summit in Alaska, United States.

== Description ==
Mount Burkett is located in the Boundary Ranges of the Coast Mountains and set on land managed by Tongass National Forest. The remote peak is 1.5 miles (2.4 km) west of the Canada–United States border, six miles (9.7 km) northeast of Devils Thumb, and 110 miles (180 km) southeast of Juneau. Precipitation runoff and glacial meltwater from the mountain drains west to Thomas Bay. Topographic relief is significant as the summit rises over 5,300 feet (1,615 m) along the south slope in one mile (1.6 km). The first ascent of the summit was made July 25, 1965, by Norman Harthill, Kenneth Bryan, George Liddle, and Edward Thompson via the southeast ridge.

== Etymology ==
The mountain was named by Julian D. Sears of the United States Geological Survey to remember Lieutenant Eugene F. Burkett (March 3, 1896 – January 7, 1930), U.S. Navy. Burkett was a member of the Alaskan Aerial Survey Expedition of the Navy Department in 1926 and second in command of the Alaska Aerial Survey Detachment in 1929. He was killed in an airplane crash on January 7, 1930, in the performance of official duty. The mountain's toponym was officially adopted in 1930 by the United States Board on Geographic Names.

== Burkett Needle ==
Burkett Needle is a 1,000-ft spire on the mountain set one-half mile west of the main summit. The easiest climbing route is rated class 5.9. The first ascent of the needle was made in August 1964 by Layton Kor and Dan Davis via the north buttress.

== Climate ==
Based on the Köppen climate classification, Mount Burkett is located in a tundra climate zone with long, cold, snowy winters, and cool summers. Weather systems coming off the Gulf of Alaska are forced upwards by the Coast Mountains (orographic lift), causing heavy precipitation in the form of rainfall and snowfall. Winter temperatures can drop to 0 °F with wind chill factors below −10 °F. This climate supports the Baird Glacier and the Stikine Icecap surrounding the peak.

== See also ==
- Southeast Alaska
- Geography of Alaska
