= Charlie Williams (footballer, born 1873) =

English footballer and manager

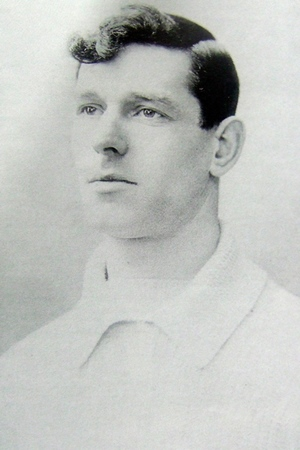
- Williams while with Brentford 1907

Personal information
- Full name: Charles Albert Williams
- Date of birth: 19 November 1873
- Place of birth: Welling, Kent, England
- Date of death: 29 July 1952 (aged 78)
- Place of death: Rio de Janeiro, Brazil
- Position: Goalkeeper

Youth career
- 1888–1889: Phoenix
- 1889–1890: Clarence
- 1890–1891: Erith

Senior career*
Years	Team	Apps	(Gls)
1891–1894	Woolwich Arsenal	19	(0)
1894–1902	Manchester City	232	(1)
1902–1904	Tottenham Hotspur	37	(0)
1904–1906	Norwich City	29	(0)
1906–1908	Brentford	59	(0)
Total		376	(1)

Managerial career
- 1908–1910: Denmark
- 1911–1912: Fluminense
- B 93
- Lille
- 1924–1926: Fluminense
- 1928: America FC (RJ)
- 1929–1930: Botafogo
- 1930–1931: Flamengo
Medal record
Men's football
Representing Denmark (as manager)
Summer Olympics
Silver medal – second place	1908 London	Team competition
- * Club domestic league appearances and goals

Charles Albert Williams (19 November 1873 – 29 July 1952) was an English football goalkeeper and manager, who was the first goalkeeper known to have scored a goal in a first-class match.

== Playing career ==
Williams started his career as a youth with minor amateur clubs Phoenix and Erith before joining Royal Arsenal in 1891. He spent his first two seasons in and out of the first team, and started the 1893–94 season, Arsenal's first in the Football League, as regular goalkeeper, being in goal for Arsenal's very first game against Newcastle United on 2 September 1893.

However, Williams was in goal for some of Arsenal's most heavy defeats that season, including a 6–0 defeat to Newcastle United and a 5–0 loss to Liverpool. Arsenal signed Harry Storer in the 1894 close season and duly sold Williams on to Manchester City; he had played 23 first-class matches in total for Arsenal.

At City, he was regular goalkeeper for eight seasons, and while there he won a Second Division winners' medal in 1898–99, and became the first goalkeeper in history to score a goal from open play, with a long clearance against Sunderland at Roker Park on 14 April 1900.

After the 1901–02 season Manchester City were relegated and Williams was released. His next club was Tottenham Hotspur who signed him in May 1902. His debut for Spurs occurred on 15 September 1902 and was a Western League game against Millwall Athletic, which Tottenham won 4–3. After George Clawley moved to Southampton, Williams became first choice keeper and was more prominent in the 1903–04 season until he left the club in October 1904.

He later had spells with Norwich City and Brentford, making 59 Southern League appearances for the latter club.

== Coaching career ==
Already in 1905 and 1907 there are reports of Williams taking charge of Københavns Boldklub (KB) in Denmark. In the Danish source it is written, that Williams had quit football already in 1905. After retiring as a player, he became a manager and took charge of the Danish national team, whom he led through the football tournament of the 1908 Olympics in London. After defeating the French B and A teams 9–0 and 17–1, Denmark lost the final gold medal match to Great Britain 2–0.

He also later managed the Danish club B 93 and French side Olympique Lillois.

Early 1911, Oscar Cox, co-founder of recently established Fluminense FC of Rio de Janeiro, on a visit in London, hired Williams to become the club's first professional coach. For this Williams was remunerated with a monthly salary of £18 plus accommodation, food and two return voyages. Williams accepted, arriving in Rio de Janeiro with a contract reportedly paying a monthly salary of £18 plus accommodation, living expenses and two return voyages.

The man who "knows all the secrets and means of the violent sport," arrived on 16 March 1911 in Rio aboard the boat Oropesa, becoming the first ever professional football coach in Brazil – Fluminense itself had been managed by a Ground Committee up to this point.

With the club he won the Championship of Rio of 1911 with an impressive record of six wins, no draws and no defeats and 21–1 goals. However, the next year was disappointing, with only a mediocre fifth place in the competition, now enlarged to eight clubs.

During the 1912 championship Williams also coached Fluminense to victory in the first ever Fla-Flu derby on 7 July 1912, against CR Flamengo which Fluminense won 3–2. It is an historic rivalry that remains one of Brazil's most famous football fixtures.

His coaching tenure was interrupted by military service during World War I. The 'Football Post', Sat, Apr 29, 1916, Page 1 reported, "Charlie Williams... returned to England and being rejected for active service, is engaged in munition work near London" [presumably at the Royal Woolwich Arsenal].

== Football Post ==
Sat, Apr 29, 1916 ·Page 1

He returned to Brazil in 1924 to lead Fluminense (from May 1924 until September 1926) to another Campeonato Carioca title and additional Torneio Início trophies in 1924 and 1925 - winning the Rio-Championship of 1924 and a second and third place in the years thereafter.

In Rio he also managed America FC, with which he won the Championship of Rio de Janeiro of 1928, defeating Fluminense in the decisive match 3–2.1] From about April 1929 until the arrival of the Hungarian coach Nicolas Ladany a year later he also managed Botafogo FC, before coaching CR Flamengo 1930–31 in 38 matches.

He retired in 1931. His influence was foundational in professionalising Brazilian football coaching, and elevating the tactical and technical standards of the game in Brazil during the early 20th century.

Williams remained in Brazil after retiring and died in Rio de Janeiro in 1952.

== Personal life ==
Williams was one of eleven siblings and worked as a teenager at the Royal Woolwich Arsenal munitions factory as a "Moulder". His younger sister Ruth Ellen Williams married Joseph Smith (jnr). Smith was the youngest son of Joseph Smith (snr), a worker at the Royal Woolwich Arsenal Dial Square Workshop, cited in the "Founding Fathers" [section] of 'Arsenal 125 Years in the Making: The official illustrated history 1886-2011', as unsuccessfully attempting to negotiate with the local cricket club for use of its pitch for Dial Square workshop's nascent works' football team. "In 1886, one Joseph Smith had tried to persuade the cricket club at the Woolwich Arsenal to allow part of their pitch to be used for football, but they would not hear of it."

Norfolk-born Smith was among the vast numbers of Norfolk rural workers who migrated for work to London and Woolwich in the mid-19th Century.

In 1894, coinciding with his transfer to Manchester City, Williams aged 20, married 17 year old Edith Emily Taylor, two months before their daughter was born in Levenhulme, Manchester. The couple had separated by the time of the 1911 census, when Edith and their daughter Mary Ann Williams were back living with Edith's parents in Plumstead, Kent. Edith remarried in 1928 Williams remarried 28th September 1925 in Rio de Janeiro to Brazilian Albertina Vargas

After his retirement, Williams remained in Brazil for the remainder of his life and died on 29 July 1952 in Rio de Janeiro, aged 78. Reports say he had a son, also named Charlie, who was a referee in the 1950s.

Seth Burkett, an English born writer and former player, is Charles Williams' great-great nephew. After being spotted by Brazilian football agents while his local team Stamford AFC were on tour in the country, he signed for Sorriso EC, a club playing in the state league of Mato Grosso, where he debuted in November 2009. Burkett has received plenty of media attention as the only Englishman be playing professionally in Brazil. He returned to Stamford AFC, playing on the seventh level of English football, in 2010. Burkett's autobiography of his football career, with his time there and his family's personal history of Charlie Williams was documented in "The Boy In Brazil" which was The Independent on Sunday 'Sports Book of The Week'

== Bibliography ==
- Soar, Phil (1995). Tottenham Hotspur The Official Illustrated History 1882–1995. Hamlyn. ISBN 0-600-58706-1.
- Goodwin, Bob (1992). The Spurs Alphabet. ACL & Polar Publishing (UK) Ltd. ISBN 0-9514862-8-4.
