= Spera, Khost Province =

Village in Khost Province, Afghanistan

Spera
- Location in Afghanistan
- Coordinates: 33°12′8″N 69°30′58″E
- Country: Afghanistan
- Province: Khost Province
- District: Spera District
- Elevation: 5,870 ft (1,790 m)
- Time zone: UTC+4:30

Spera (Pashto: سپیره) (also spelt Sperah and Speyrah) is a village and the district center of Spera District, Khost Province, Afghanistan. It is located on 33.2022°N 69.5161°E at 1,790 m altitude. The town is located within the heartland of the Zadran tribe of Pashtuns. During the US occupation of Afghanistan, Spera sat along a highly used smuggling route from Pakistan into Afghanistan. The area was known to harbor many ex members of both the Taliban and the Al Qaeda.

Spera is the location where United States Army Ranger Pat Tillman was fatally shot and killed by friendly fire in 2004.

== See also ==
- Khost Province
