= Three Cups of Deceit =

Book by Jon Krakauer

Three Cups of Deceit - How Greg Mortenson, Humanitarian Hero, Lost His Way
- Softcover edition
- Author: Jon Krakauer
- Language: English
- Subject: Greg Mortenson
- Genre: Non-fiction
- Publisher: Byliner
- Publication date: April 20, 2011
- Publication place: United States
- Media type: e-book
- Pages: 96 pp.
- ISBN: 0307948765
- OCLC: 1033675717
- Preceded by: Where Men Win Glory
- Followed by: Missoula: Rape and the Justice System in a College Town

Three Cups of Deceit: How Greg Mortenson, Humanitarian Hero, Lost His Way is a 2011 e-book written by Jon Krakauer about Three Cups of Tea (2007) and Stones into Schools (2009) author Greg Mortenson. In it, Krakauer disputes Mortenson's accounts of his experiences in Afghanistan and Pakistan, and accuses him of mishandling funds donated to his charity, Central Asia Institute (CAI).

== History ==
Krakauer was featured during a CBS 60 Minutes report on April 17, 2011, where 60 Minutes reporter Steve Kroft raised questions about humanitarian Greg Mortenson and the non-profit Central Asia Institute (CAI). Krakauer questioned the accuracy of events in Mortenson's book Three Cups of Tea and whether Mortenson was kidnapped by the Taliban in 1996 as described in his second book, Stones into Schools. Krakauer went on to question Mortenson's credibility through the financial practices of CAI. Krakauer had been a financial supporter of Mortenson's work and had previously donated $75,000 before becoming disillusioned with him and his management of CAI. The 60 Minutes story largely retraced the conclusions Krakauer came to as described in Three Cups of Deceit.

The book was released the day after the 60 Minutes piece aired, initially available on a limited basis at byliner.com for free download in April 2011. It has since been released in a number of digital formats. The Kindle Single edition e-book rose to number one on Kindle Single's bestseller's list. On July 1, 2011 the book was released as a paperback edition published by Anchor Books. A much expanded, revised, and updated edition was published in November 2014.

== Reception ==
Krakauer has received both criticism and praise for the book Three Cups of Deceit. The e-book was described as both "Krakauer's fact-based gut-punch to Three Cups of Tea" and to "have a bit of a 'jilted lover' feel to it" by Chamber Four online book reviewer Marcos Velasquez, who congratulated Krakauer on the book's release. A starred review in Publishers Weekly proclaimed, "Packed with interviews and anecdotes that undercut Mortenson's image as a cheerful do-gooder, Krakauer's account of good intentions gone horribly wrong is a stunning example of investigative journalism". Critics of Krakauer's work, however, have said Krakauer's focus is in the wrong direction.

Marjorie Kehe, books editor for The Christian Science Monitor, stated in her article on Krakauer's book, "...having read and fully digested Three Cups of Deceit, I can still identify...fundamental truths in both of Mortenson's books, Three Cups of Tea and Stones Into Schools." Kehe went on to state, "Most of us, if we had established one such school – or even played a part in doing so – might feel that we had justified our very existences by that act. Mortenson has done this many, many times over. I'm not saying that this makes any wrongs he has committed right. It doesn't. But it certainly ought to be weighed in the balance."

As a response to Krakauer's allegations, CAI produced a comprehensive list of projects completed over a period of years and projects CAI is currently working on. The list was released in December 2011.

== Controversy ==
Scott Darsney, a respected mountaineer and friend of Greg Mortenson, wrote a response to Krakauer's allegations that was published as an exclusive article in Outside magazine's online version. Darsney's response questioned the accuracy and fairness of both the Krakauer piece and the 60 Minutes report. He further stated that Krakauer either misquoted or misunderstood what he said when interviewed by the author. Darsney went on to say that Krakauer took Mortenson's experiences in Afghanistan and Pakistan out of context and added, "If Jon Krakauer and some of Greg's detractors had taken the time to have three or more cups of tea with Greg and others—instead of one cup of tea with a select few who would discredit him—they would have found some minor problems and transgressions. But to the extent to call it all 'lies' and 'fraud'? No way." Darsney stated in reference to the possibility that Mortenson has been dishonest in his financial dealings through CAI, "If Greg is misappropriating funds, then show me the luxury cars, fancy boats, and closets full of shoes. This is not a "ministry" or a business gone corrupt." The Outside article also touched on the allegations that Mortenson lied about being held captive by the Taliban. In light of that controversy, Darsney stated, "Greg recounted to me his imprisonment in Waziristan when I met him in Beijing. I don't doubt that he was held against his will." Darsney's article went on to say that Krakauer is a respected journalist and a "stickler for details and getting the facts straight", but that he felt "the research needs to continue".

In February 2012, it was reported that an investigation by the Montana Attorney General was underway.

On April 5, 2012, the Montana Attorney General's office released a report noting financial "missteps" by CAI and Greg Mortenson. The Attorney General reached a settlement for restitution from Mortenson to CAI in excess of $1 million.

According to the May 3, 2013, issue of The Los Angeles Times, the 9th Circuit Court of Appeals in San Francisco upheld the 2012 federal dismissal by Judge Samuel Haddon in Montana, stating he had ruled in accordance to the laws and rules governing class action suits. Haddon ruled correctly that readers were not entitled to financial compensation based on any of the arguments presented by the plaintiffs. The suit was filed days after the publication of the above titled book, as well as the "60 Minutes" presentation.

According to Central Asia Institute's Board chairman, Steve Barrett, announced on October 9, 2013, that the CAI and Mortenson have fully complied with all the specific actions and repayments as negotiated by the settlement with then Attorney General (now Governor) Steve Bullock.

Journalists Jennifer Jordan and Jeff Rhoads began investigating the claims against Mortenson and made a 2016 documentary 3000 Cups of Tea. In the film, Jordan claims that the accusations against Mortenson put forward by 60 Minutes and Jon Krakauer are largely not true.
