= Michael Burkett =

Michael Burkett may refer to:

- Mike Burkett (politician) (born 1948), American attorney and politician from Idaho
- Mike Burkett, popularly known as Fat Mike, punk musician
- Michael Burkett (cricketer) (born 1950), South African cricketer
