= Eiger Dreams =

Book by Jon Krakauer

- Paperback edition
- Author: Jon Krakauer
- Language: English
- Subject: Collection of essays
- Genre: Non-fiction
- Publisher: Lyons Press
- Publication date: 1990
- Publication place: United States
- Media type: Print, e-book
- Pages: 189 pp.
- ISBN: 0-385-48818-1
- Followed by: Into the Wild

Eiger Dreams: Ventures Among Men and Mountains is a non-fiction collection of articles and essays by Jon Krakauer on mountaineering and rock climbing. Eleven out of twelve of the chapters were initially published between 1982 and 1989 in the magazines Outside, Smithsonian, and New Age Journal.

== Overview ==
It concerns a variety of topics, from ascending the Eiger Nordwand in the Swiss Alps, Denali in Alaska or K2 in the Karakoram, to the well-known rock climbers Jon Krakauer has met on his trips, such as John Gill, Adrian Popovich or the Burgess brothers.

== Chapters of the book ==
- "Eiger Dreams"
- "Gill"
- "Valdez Ice"
- "On Being Tentbound"
- "The Flyboys of Talkeetna"
- "Club Denali"
- "Chamonix"
- "Canyoneering"
- "A Mountain Higher Than Everest?"
- "The Burgess Boys"
- "A Bad Summer on K2"
- "The Devils Thumb"

== Reviews ==
Recommending it for adventure collections for young adults, a 1990 review in School Library Journal said, "No one picking up this book will remain indifferent to the awesome splendor of the peaks or the sheer determination of the people who, with only tiny crampon points and small ice axes, tackle climbing them in spite of blizzards, frostbite, terror of glacial crevasses, and avalanches." The review also noted that women played a very peripheral role in the expeditions and at base camp.

== Bibliography ==
- Eiger Dreams: Ventures Among Men and Mountains (1990) ISBN 0-385-48818-1
