= Christopher Burkett =

American photographer

Christopher Burkett (born 1951) is an American landscape photographer known for large format photography of woodlands.

== Photography ==
Burkett has been making prints since 1980. His works include very large Cibachrome color prints (40x50) from 8x10 transparencies. According to Jim Alinder, "[t]he best of Christopher Burkett's photographs have an almost mystical sense of connection to us, one that cannot fully be conveyed through words or reproductions.

Burkett is also a former brother in an Orthodox Christian religious order who, Vincent Rossi writes, has "transformed photographic technique into a spiritual endeavor."

On April 15, 2018 the PBS national network broadcast a segment about Burkett on NewsHour Weekend. The program reviewed his photography favorably.

Three of his photographs are in the collection of the Portland Art Museum, and another is in the collection of the Birmingham Museum of Art.

== Reviews and awards ==
Burkett's books and exhibits have been reviewed in the Bloomsbury Review, San Diego Union-Tribune, The Washington Post, and Book Reader; an interview with Burkett was published in View Camera magazine. Articles about Burkett have also appeared in Camera Arts, Hasselblad Forum, and Popular Photography. The North American Bookdealers Exchange awarded Burkett's book Intimations of Paradise Best Book of the Year for Art and Photography in 1999 and in 2004 he was one of twelve photographers honored with the Hasselblad Masters award for his photography by camera manufacturer Hasselblad.

== Life ==
Burkett was born in 1951, grew up in the Pacific Northwest, and now lives in Oregon. He joined a Christian religious brotherhood in the early 1970s and, in 1975, first became interested in photography as a form of spiritual expression. In 1979 he left the brotherhood and married his wife, Ruth.

Since then he and his wife are Orthodox. Burkett attends the Church of the Annunciation in Milwaukie, which belongs to the Orthodox Church of America (OCA).

== Bibliography ==
- Christopher Burkett (1999). Intimations of Paradise: Photographs by Christopher Burkett. West Wind Arts. ISBN 978-0967021607.
- Christopher Burkett (2004). Resplendent Light: Photographs by Christopher Burkett. West Wind Arts. ISBN 0-9670216-1-8.
- Robert Frost (1992). Robert Frost Seasons: Poems by Robert Frost Photographs by Christopher Burkett. Henry Holt. ISBN 0-8050-2433-6.
