= Seth Burkett =

English footballer (born 1991)

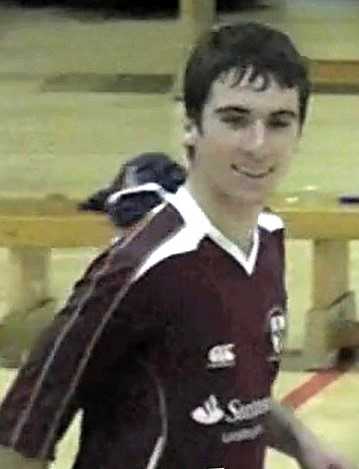
- Burkett playing for Loughborough Futsal in 2012

Personal information
- Date of birth: 14 March 1991 (age 35)
- Place of birth: Peterborough, England
- Position: Defender

Youth career
- Peterborough United

Senior career*
Years	Team	Apps	(Gls)
2008–2009	Stamford	12	(0)
2009	→ March Town United (loan)		
2009–2010	Sorriso EC	0	(0)
2010	Stamford		
2010–2015	Loughborough Futsal		
- London United Futsal
- Baku United Futsal
- * Club domestic league appearances and goals as of 10:31, 29 November 2018 (UTC)

Seth Burkett (born 14 March 1991) is an English writer, futsal player and former professional footballer.

A defender, Burkett formerly played in Brazil for Sorriso EC, a team in the state league of Mato Grosso. While there, he attracted some attention as the only British footballer playing professionally in Brazil.

== Early and personal life ==
Burkett was born in Peterborough, Cambridgeshire, and grew up in nearby Barnack, also in Cambridgeshire.

Burkett is related to the former professional footballer Charlie Williams, who was also active in Brazil, as a manager with Fluminense and Corinthians. Williams has been described in the media as Burkett's great-granduncle.

== Football career ==
Burkett began his football career with the youth team of hometown club Peterborough United, before later rejecting a contract offer from non-league team Kettering Town to continue his school studies at A-Level. After leaving the Peterborough youth system, Burkett joined non-league club Stamford, where he was Captain of the youth team. He later made 12 appearances for Stamford's senior team after making his debut in September 2008. Burkett also spent time on loan at March Town United during the first few games of the 2009–10 season.

In June 2009, while on a tournament with the Stamford youth team in Salvador da Bahia in the northeast of Brazil, Burkett was spotted by a football agent who helped him sign a six-month contract with Sorriso EC, a club from the state league of Mato Grosso. He made his debut with the club in a friendly match in November 2009. Burkett attracted some media attention in Brazil in January 2010 when Sorriso took him to the Copa São Paulo de Futebol Júnior, an annual under-18 youth tournament run by the São Paulo Football Federation, as English players are rare in Brazilian clubs. "I was a substitute in all three matches," reported Seth Burkett from this event. During his six months with the club, Burkett played a total of fifteen minutes for the first-team of Sorriso, which was in a pre-season friendly in January 2010. After the end of his contract, in May 2010, Burkett had negotiations with another Brazilian club side, Taboão.

After leaving Brazil in June 2010, Burkett enrolled at Loughborough University.

Burkett re-joined Stamford in summer 2010, signing an extension in July 2011.

== Futsal career ==
In 2011, Burkett was also called up to the England futsal squad. He played for Loughborough Futsal from 2010 to 2015, and later played for London United Futsal and Baku United FC.

== Writing career ==
In 2014, Burkett released a book on his time in Brazil, called The Boy in Brazil, which made The Independent's 'Book of the Week' in June.
