= Susan Burkett =

American electronics engineer

Susan L. Burkett is a retired American electronics engineer whose research has focused on the interconnects of integrated circuits, including copper through-silicon vias and chip stacking. She is the former Alabama Power Foundation Endowed Professor of Electrical and Computer Engineering at the University of Alabama, and the former president of the American Vacuum Society.

== Education and career ==
Burkett is originally from Columbia, Missouri. She enjoyed mathematics and science in high school, but lacked the confidence to go into engineering. Instead, she received a bachelor's degree in dietetics from Southwest Missouri State University, and worked as a dietician at a local hospital. Seeking a more challenging and higher-paying career, she returned to school and majored in electrical engineering at the University of Missouri, graduating with a second bachelor's degree in 1985. After briefly working as an engineer for AT&T, she continued at the University of Missouri for graduate study, receiving a master's degree in 1987 and completing her Ph.D. in 1992.

After postdoctoral research for Becton Dickinson in North Carolina, Burkett became an assistant professor of electrical and computer engineering at the University of Alabama in 1994. She moved to Boise State University in 1997, and was tenured as an associate professor there in 2000. From 2002 to 2007 she worked at the University of Arkansas, with a leave from 2005 to 2007 to be a program director at the National Science Foundation. She was promoted to full professor in 2007. In 2008 she returned to the University of Alabama as Alabama Power Foundation Endowed Professor. At the University of Alabama, she directed the Alabama Louis Stokes Alliance for Minority Participation. She retired in 2019.

Burkett directed the Women in Engineering Division of the American Society for Engineering Education from 2013 to 2016. She was the 2021 president of the American Vacuum Society.

== Recognition ==
The American Vacuum Society named Burkett as a fellow in 2016.
