= Jenny Tinghui Zhang =

Chinese-American writer

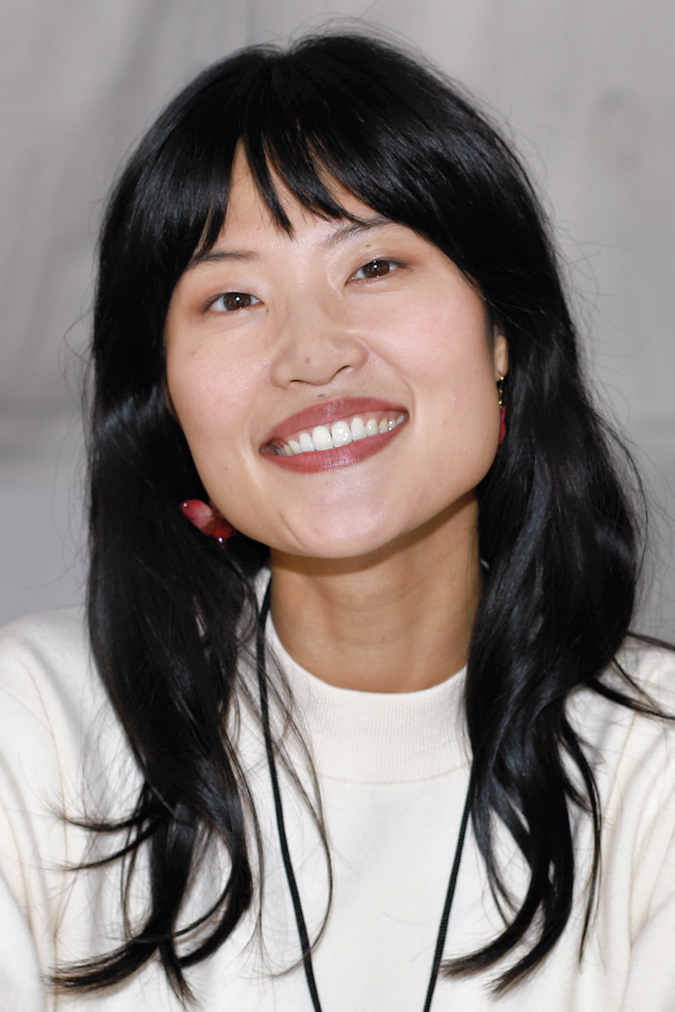
- Zhang at the 2022 Texas Book Festival
- Born: Changchun, China
- Education: University of Wyoming (MFA)
- Occupations: novelist; essayist
- Years active: 2015–present
- Notable work: Four Treasures of the Sky
- Website: jennytinghui.com

Jenny Tinghui Zhang is a Chinese-American writer best known for her debut novel, Four Treasures of the Sky. In 2024, she was named a "5 Under 35" Honoree by the National Book Foundation.

== Early life and education ==
Zhang was born in Changchun, China, and grew up in Austin, Texas, and Oxford, Mississippi. She received an MFA from the University of Wyoming.

== Career ==
She is an editor for The Adroit Journal, and her writing has appeared in The Rumpus, HuffPost, Catapult, Literary Hub, and The Cut.

Zhang's first novel, Four Treasures of the Sky, was published by Flatiron and Penguin in 2022. It was a New York Times Book Review Editor's Choice, and was reviewed by NPR, The Washington Post, and Publishers Weekly, among others. The novel was longlisted for the Chautauqua Prize, the Dublin Literary Award, the Carnegie Medal for Excellence in Fiction, and the VCU Cabell First Novelist Award.

Ann Patchett praised Zhang's "considerable talents" in writing an "engulfing, bighearted, and heartbreaking novel." In her review at The New York Times, Jennifer Egan described Zhang's writing as "engrossing" and "an arresting combination of earthy and lyric."

In 2022, Zhang told interviewers that she was working on her second novel. That work, Superfan, was published in the USA by Macmillan on February 3, 2026 and in the UK by Penguin on February 19, 2026.

== Writing style and influences ==
Zhang has cited C Pam Zhang's How Much of These Hills Is Gold, Barbara Kingsolver's The Poisonwood Bible, and Alexander Chee's Edinburgh as sources of inspiration for her writing.

== Works ==
- —— (2022). Four Treasures of the Sky (hardcover 1st ed.). New York: Flatiron Books. ISBN 9781250811783.
- —— (2026). Superfan. New York: Flatiron Books. ISBN 9781250369666.
