= Burkett Islands =

Island group in Enderby Land, Antarctica

- Location within Antarctica

Geography
- Coordinates: 66°55′48″S 50°18′36″E
- Archipelago: Burkett Islands

Administration
- Administered under the Antarctic Treaty System

Demographics
- Population: Uninhabited

The Burkett Islands are a group of small islands lying just west of Mount Gleadell in the eastern part of Amundsen Bay, in Enderby Land. They were mapped from air photos taken from an aircraft of the Australian National Antarctic Research Expeditions (ANARE) in 1956. They were named by the Antarctic Names Committee of Australia (ANCA) for G.E.L. Burkett, radio officer at Wilkes Station in 1960.

== See also ==
- Composite Antarctic Gazetteer
- List of Antarctic and sub-Antarctic islands
- List of Antarctic islands south of 60° S
- SCAR
- Territorial claims in Antarctica
