= Luis Jaramillo (writer) =

American novelist and short story writer

Luis Jaramillo (born January 1975) is an American novelist and short story writer. He is the author of the 2025 novel The Witches of El Paso and the 2012 short story collection The Doctor's Wife.

== Background and career ==
Jaramillo received his undergraduate degree from Stanford University and an MFA in creative writing from The New School.

His 2012 collection of short stories, The Doctor's Wife, was published by indie press Dzanc Books after winning their 2010 literary contest. The book is a collection of short, interconnected vignettes that are semi-autobiographical, depicting moments from the lives of members of three generations of his family on Jaramillo's mother's side as they contend with the untimely death of their youngest son, his uncle. The Rumpus described it as a "palimpsest of a family saga" that "toys with the plasticity of fiction, nonfiction, and memoir." A 2013 Brooklyn Rail interview highlighted "[Jaramillo's] imagistic descriptions ... almost idyllic slices of mid-century Americana." The Doctor's Wife was one of NPR's Best Books of 2012 and named the Book of the Week by Oprah.com.

Jaramillo wrote his 2025 debut novel, The Witches of El Paso, over the course of ten years. His first inspiration for the novel came from discovering ladybug visitors on his windowsill over and over, which then prompted him to "call to the witches." Drawing on his familial roots in El Paso, the novel is told in three time periods and focuses on Nena, a teen girl who discovers she has "La Vista," a magical capacity to see the future and travel through time, and her great niece Marta, who must figure out what to do with a 93-year-old Nena while also juggling problems at her law firm and the fact that she's developing La Vista, too. A starred review from Kirkus Reviews called the book "Gripping and cinematic," adding that "the novel's worlds of El Paso past and present will bewitch and enrapture;" LitHub wrote that "Luis Jaramillo's debut novel is a taut, fantastical, time-folding epic," and that "Jaramillo has a knack for writing lusty, restless spirits."

His writing has also appeared in Literary Hub, BOMB Magazine, and the Los Angeles Review of Books, and he has received fellowships from Aspen Words, the Sewanee Writers' Conference, and the New York Institute for the Humanities.

Jaramillo teaches creative writing at The New School in New York City, where he is a proponent of using crayons in class.

== Personal life ==
Jaramillo married American songwriter and performer Matthew Brookshire in 2009.

== Selected works ==
- The Doctor's Wife (2012)
- The Witches of El Paso (2024)
