= Stikine Icecap =

Icefield in Canada and the United States

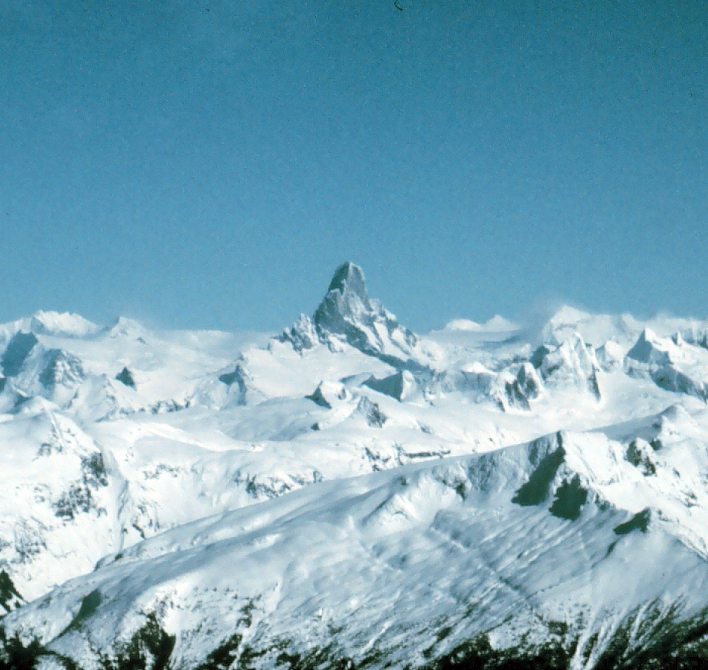
- The Devils Thumb rises above the Stikine Icecap

- Location within British Columbia
- Type: Icecap
- Location: Canada–United States border
- Coordinates: 57°04′14″N 132°13′51″W
- Terminus: outflow glaciers

The Stikine Icecap (sometimes referred to as the Stikine Icefield) is a large icefield straddled on the Alaska–British Columbia boundary in the Alaska Panhandle region. It lies in the Boundary Ranges of the Coast Mountains. Within the United States, most of it is under the administration of the Tongass National Forest and is part of the Stikine-LeConte Wilderness within the national forest.

A good size icefield, the icecap is a primary source for both the Taku River, which forms its northern boundary, and the Taku's southern tributaries, and also the Stikine River and its lower western tributaries, notably the Chutine, which form its southern and southwestern boundary, respectively. The Stikine Icecap is the parent icefield of the LeConte and Sawyer Glaciers on its US side, and the Great Glacier on its Canadian side. Also on the Canadian side and entering the lower Stikine, like the Great Glacier, are the Mud and Flood Glaciers, which form the boundaries of the small Boundary Range, which is an eastern abutment of the range comprising the Stikine Icecap and marks the approximate boundary claimed by the United States prior to the Alaska Boundary Settlement of 1903.

The Stikine Icecap area is also renowned for its technically demanding granite peaks and spires, which have earned comparisons to North America's version of Patagonia. Peaks of particular renown include Devils Thumb, Witches Tits, Cat's Ears, and the Burkett Needle.

== See also ==
- Juneau Icefield
- List of glaciers and icefields
