= Lacy M. Johnson =

American writer, professor and activist

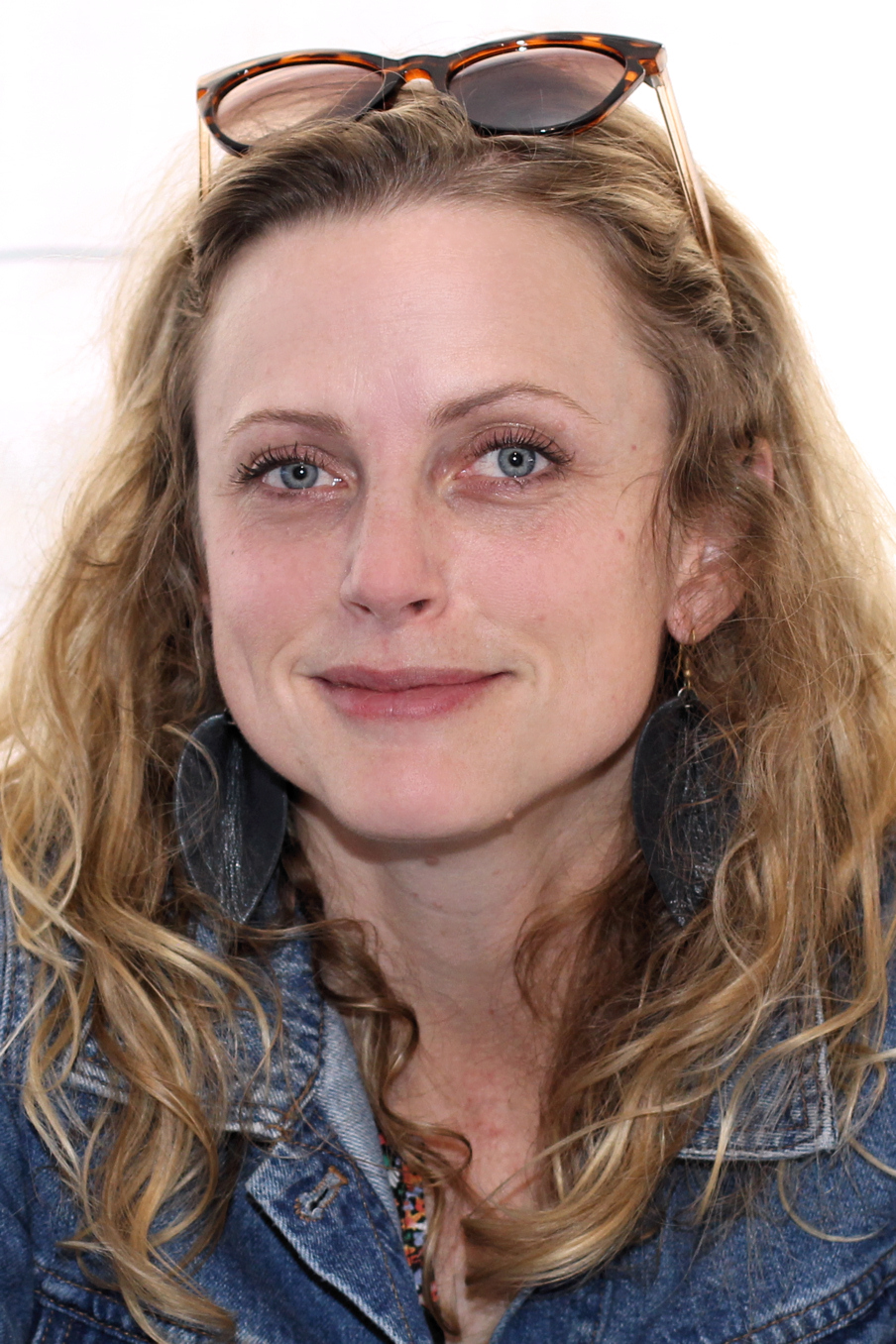
- Johnson at the 2018 Texas Book Festival
- Born: 1978 (age 47–48); Iowa
- Education: University of Missouri; University of Kansas; University of Houston
- Occupations: Author; Professor
- Years active: 2004-present
- Website: lacymjohnson.com

Lacy M. Johnson (born in 1978) is an American writer, professor and activist. She is the author of Trespasses: A Memoir (University of Iowa Press, 2012), The Other Side: A Memoir (Tin House, 2014) and The Reckonings: Essays (Scribner, 2018).

== Early life and education ==
Johnson was born in Iowa. She grew up in rural Missouri, in a town called Macon, Missouri, which was featured in her 2012 book, Trespasses: A Memoir.

In 2002, Johnson received a B.A. from the University of Missouri. In 2004, she received an M.A. from the University of Kansas. In 2008, Johnson earned a Ph.D. from University of Houston’s Creative Writing Program. Her thesis was called I, Mongrel.

== Career ==
Johnson has written two memoirs, 2012's Trespasses: A Memoir and 2014's The Other Side: A Memoir. In both memoirs, Johnson tells readers about when her ex-boyfriend kidnapped, raped, and held her hostage in 2000. The books do not focus on the violence, but rather on how Johnson is reclaiming her story and learning how to cope with her trauma. After her second book, The Other Side was published, Johnson was repeatedly asked the question, "What would she like to see happen to her rapist."

This question began Johnson's investigation into the concepts of forgiveness and mercy in her 2018 book, The Reckonings: Essays, where to many audience members' surprise, Johnson does not want vengeance, and frequently says that her idea of justice is to have her rapist be held accountable and for her to heal. Johnson's rapist was never brought to trial after he fled arrest and now lives in Venezuela.

The Other Side: A Memoir was named One of The Best Books of 2014 by Kirkus Reviews and was a finalist for the Council of Literary Magazines and Presses Firecracker Award in Nonfiction, the Dayton Literary Peace Prize the National Book Critics Circle Award and the Edgar Award in Best Fact Crime.

The Reckonings: Essays, was a finalist in the Criticism category of the National Book Critics Circle Award.

Johnson has said that her formal training was in poetry, which was one of the structures she used in the often short pieces in her first book, Trespasses: A Memoir.

Johnson teaches at Rice University in creative nonfiction.

Johnson is the founding director of the Houston Flood Museum.

== Personal life ==
Johnson is married and has children. She lives in Houston.

== Selected honors ==
- 2020: John Simon Guggenheim Memorial Foundation, Guggenheim Fellowship, Creative Arts, General Nonfiction

== Selected works and publications ==
=== Selected works ===
- Johnson, Lacy M. (2012). Trespasses: A Memoir. Iowa City, Iowa: University of Iowa Press. ISBN 978-1-609-38078-6. OCLC 755004214.
- Johnson, Lacy M. (2014). The Other Side: A Memoir. Portland, Oregon: Tin House Books. ISBN 978-1-935-63983-1. OCLC 1090916550.
- Johnson, Lacy M. (2018). The Reckonings: Essays. New York: Scribner. ISBN 978-1-501-15902-2. OCLC 1056625542.

=== Selected publications ===
- Johnson, Lacy M. (Summer 2012). "The Addict". Creative Nonfiction (45): 46–51. OCLC 7788007857.
- Johnson, Lacy M. (1 October 2015). "On Mercy: Reconciling a death sentence, from a pediatric cancer ward to death row". Guernica.
- Johnson, Lacy M. (10 July 2017). "The Fallout". Guernica.
- Johnson, Lacy M. (7 September 2017). "Opinion: It's the DACA Decision, Not Hurricane Harvey, That May Tear Houston Apart". The New York Times.
- Johnson, Lacy M. (Fall 2018). "The Will of the Water: Scenes From Hurricane Harvey". Virginia Quarterly Review. 94 (3). OCLC 7975053765.
- Johnson, Lacy M. (9 October 2018). "I Want a Reckoning". The Paris Review.
- Johnson, Lacy M. (2 October 2019). "Lacy Johnson: Men in Power and the Lies They Tell - On Brett Kavanaugh, Donald Trump, and the Malleability of Truth". Literary Hub.
- Johnson, Lacy M. (20 October 2019). "How to Mourn a Glacier". The New Yorker.
