= List of University of South Dakota people =

The following is a list of notable people associated with University of South Dakota, located in the American city of Vermillion, South Dakota.

== Notable alumni ==
=== Academia ===
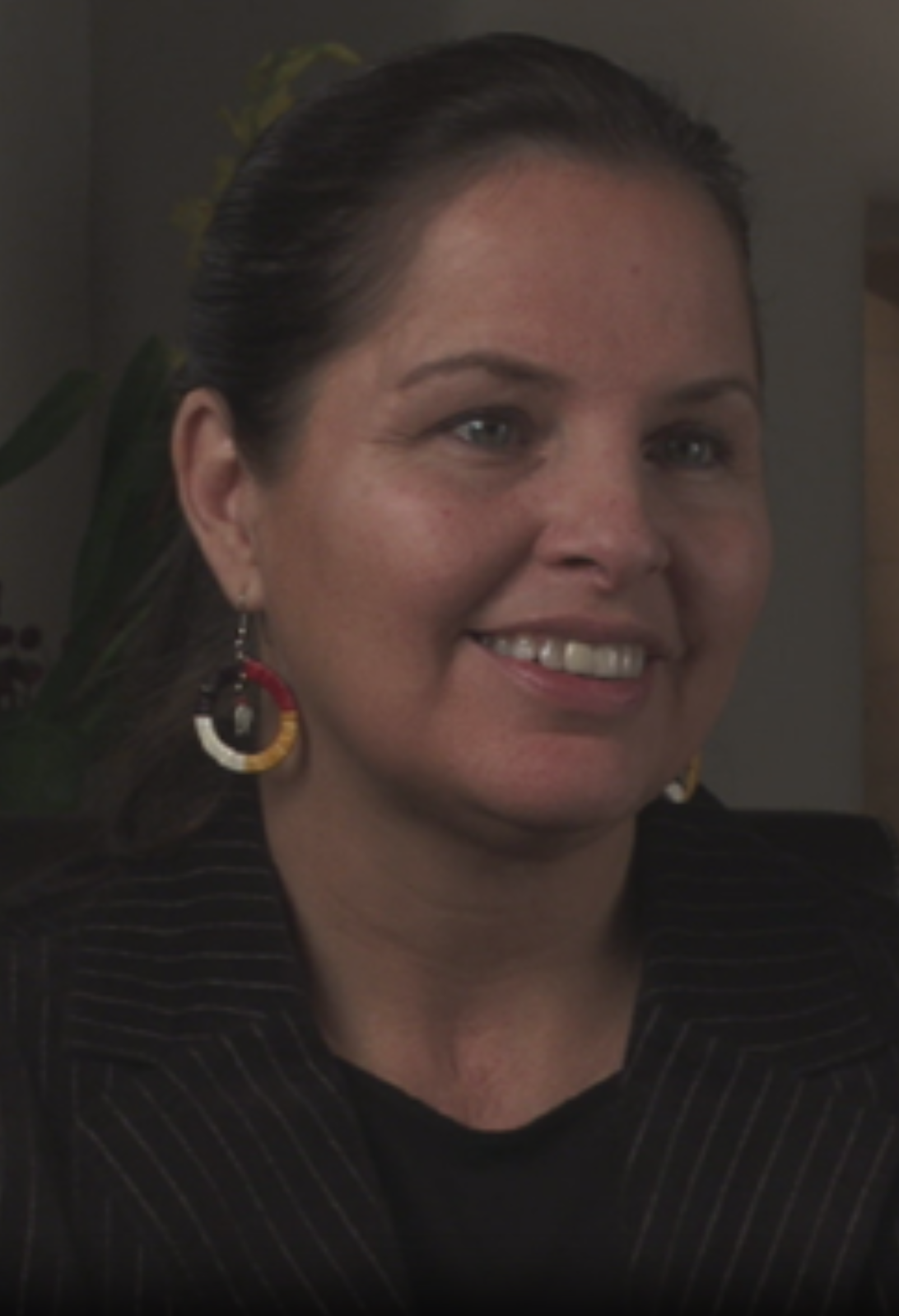
Cynthia Lindquist

- Robert Legvold, former director of the Harriman Institute, Columbia University Sovietologist
- Cynthia Lindquist, president of Cankdeska Cikana Community College
- Kay Schallenkamp, president of Emporia State University, and later Black Hills State University

=== Politics and government ===
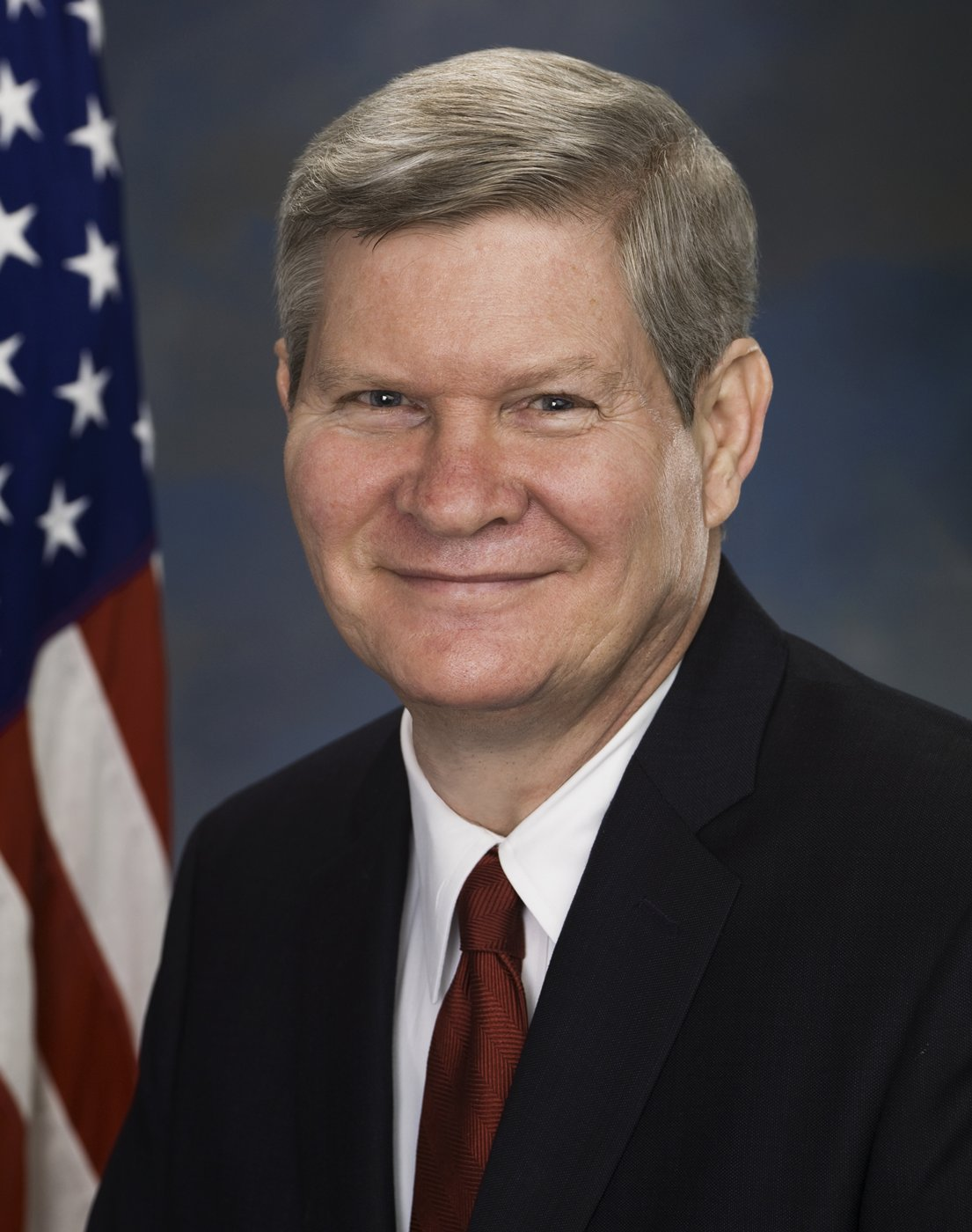
Tim Johnson

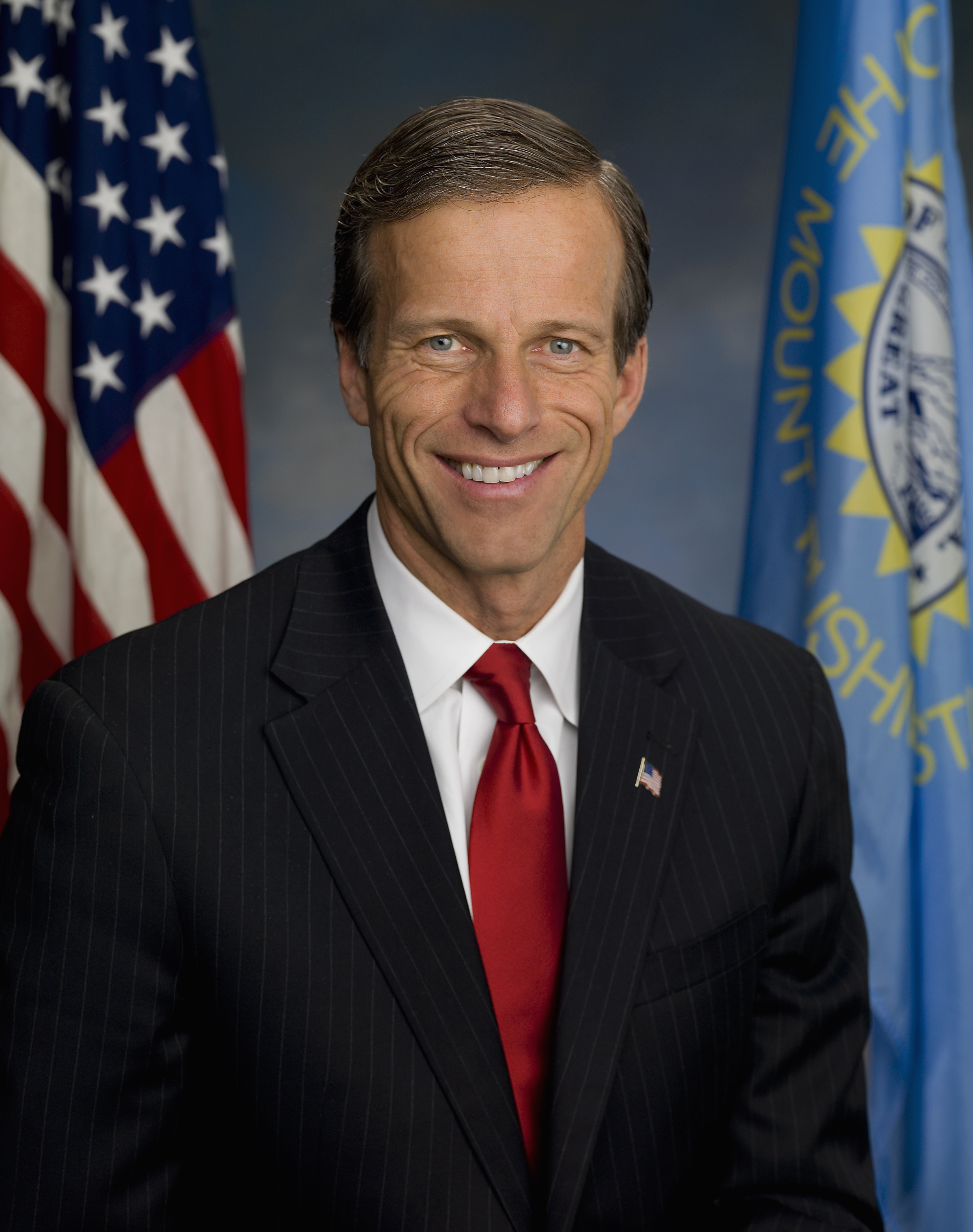
John Thune

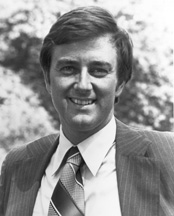
Larry Pressler

- James Abourezk, U.S. senator and U.S. representative from South Dakota, first Arab-American U.S. senator
- Sigurd Anderson, governor of South Dakota
- Joseph H. Bottum, 27th lieutenant governor of South Dakota and a member of the United States Senate
- Kevin Brady, U.S. representative from Texas
- Dwight Burney, 30th governor of Nebraska
- Dan Crippen, director of the Congressional Budget Office
- Dennis Daugaard, 32nd governor of South Dakota
- George E. "Bud" Day, retired Air Force colonel, ex-POW, and most highly decorated military officer since Douglas MacArthur
- Frank Farrar, 24th governor of South Dakota
- Joe Foss, Marine Corp Medal of Honor recipient, 20th governor of South Dakota, first commissioner of the American Football League
- Carl Gunderson, governor of South Dakota
- Charles R. Hayes, justice of the South Dakota Supreme Court
- Daryl Hecht, justice of the Iowa Supreme Court
- Carole Hillard, lieutenant governor of South Dakota
- Marty Jackley, 30th attorney general of South Dakota
- Bill Janklow, governor of South Dakota and representative of South Dakota
- Leslie Jensen, governor of South Dakota
- Dusty Johnson, U.S. representative and PUC commissioner
- Tim Johnson, U.S. senator from South Dakota
- Steve T. Kirby, lieutenant governor of South Dakota
- Roberto Lange, judge of U.S. District Court of South Dakota
- Richard Barrett Lowe, governor of American Samoa and governor of Guam
- Matt Michels, lieutenant governor of South Dakota
- George S. Mickelson, governor of South Dakota
- John C. Miller Jr., United States Marine Corps brigadier general
- Byron S. Payne, South Dakota attorney general
- Larry Pressler, U.S. representative and senator from South Dakota
- A. J. Rosier, Wyoming state senator
- Merrell Q. Sharpe, attorney general of South Dakota 1929–1933, and governor of South Dakota 1943–1947
- Harold J. Sykora, National Guard major general, adjutant general of South Dakota
- John Thune, U.S. senator from South Dakota
- Tony Venhuizen, 40th lieutenant governor of South Dakota

=== Athletics ===
- Dwight Anderson, cornerback and 2010 CFL All-Star
- Ordell Braase, 1957–68, drafted in 14th round by the Baltimore Colts, two-time All-Pro, NFL Players Association President
- George Burnside, former Racine Legion blocking back
- Matt Chatham, former NFL linebacker (2000–05, New England Patriots, 2006–07, New York Jets)
- Tom Compton, offensive lineman for the Washington Redskins
- Filip Filipović, former NFL punter (2002–2003 Dallas Cowboys, 2003–2004 San Francisco 49ers, 2004 Minnesota Vikings, 2006 Houston Texans, 2007 Chicago Bears)
- Yvette Greer-Albrecht, hurdler
- Emily Grove, pole vaulter
- Greg Lansing, basketball head coach, Indiana State
- Stefan Logan, return specialist for Detroit Lions
- Mark McLoughlin, former Calgary Stampeders kicker
- Derek Miles, pole vaulter for USA Track & Field and Olympian
- Ko Quaye, defensive lineman for the Orlando Predators of the Arena Football League
- Joe Robbie, original owner of the Miami Dolphins franchise
- A.J. Schable, defensive end for NFL Seattle Seahawks; 2006, Arizona Cardinals
- Josh Stamer, former NFL linebacker (2003–07, Buffalo Bills; 2008, Tennessee Titans; 2009, Cleveland Browns, Buffalo Bills)
- Tyler Starr, Atlanta Falcons linebacker, drafted 255th overall in 7th round of 2014 NFL draft
- Travis Theis, football player in Canadian Football League
- Jamel White, former running back (1999, Indianapolis Colts; 1999, Cleveland Browns; 2004, Tampa Bay Buccaneers; 2005, Detroit Lions)

=== Other ===
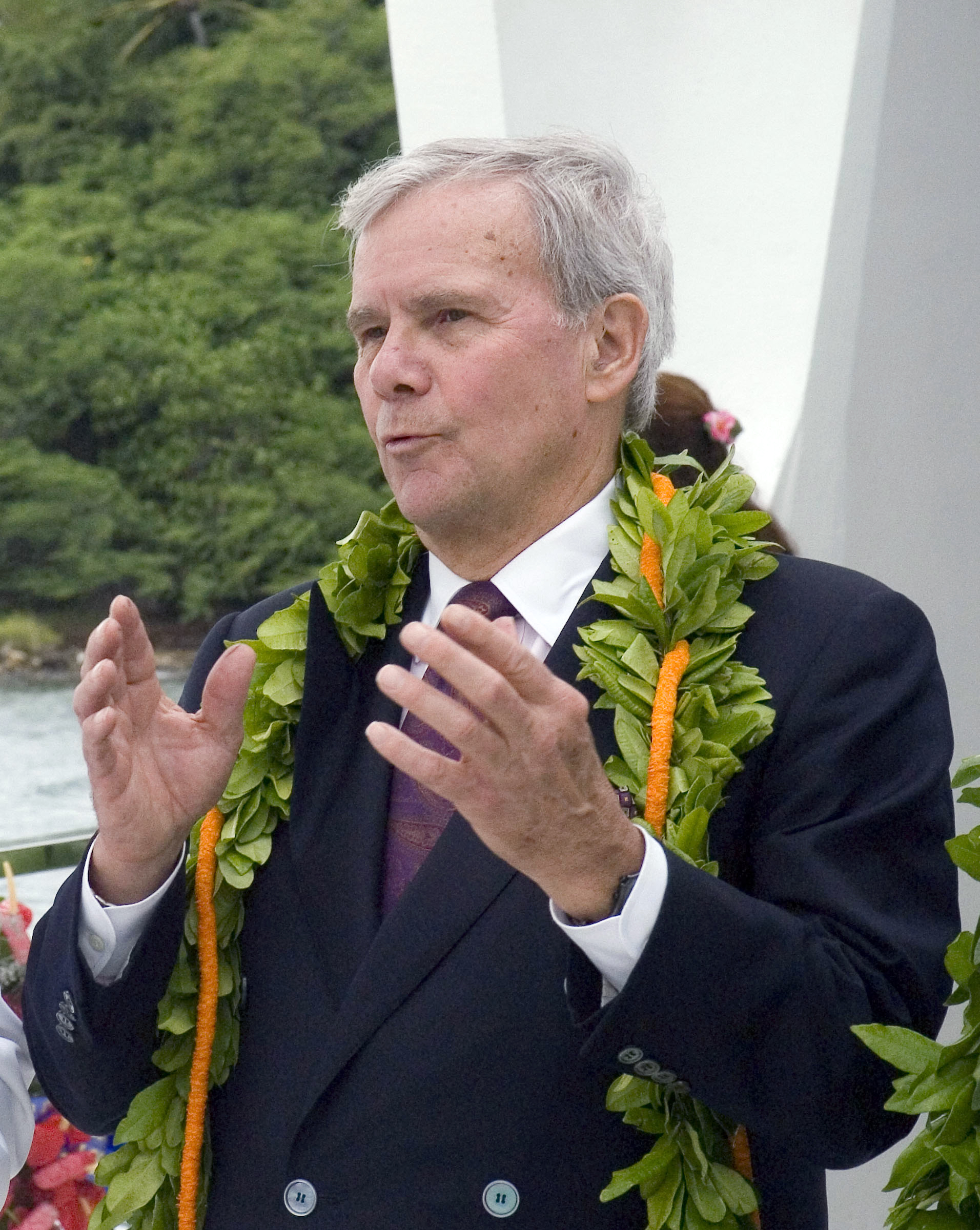
Tom Brokaw

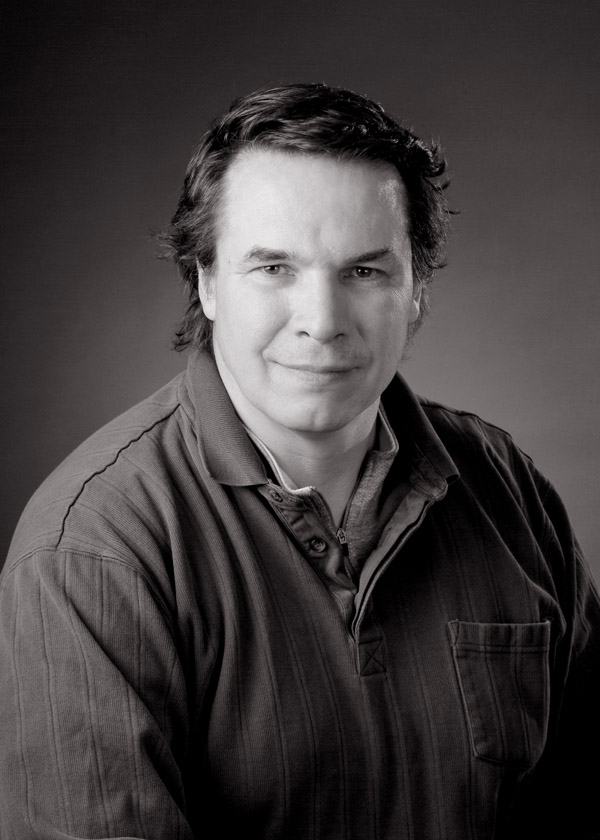
Greg Mortenson

- Tillie Black Bear, anti-domestic violence activist
- Norman H. Boke, botanist
- Ernest Bormann, rhetorical theorist
- Tom Brokaw, longtime NBC News anchorman and retired NBC Nightly News anchor
- Pete Dexter, novelist
- Ernest O. Lawrence, inventor of the cyclotron; winner of 1939 Nobel Prize for Physics; namesake of chemical element 103, lawrencium; participated in the Manhattan Project
- John H. Lawrence, physicist and physician recognized for pioneering work in nuclear medicine; often referred to as the father of modern nuclear medicine
- Faye Cashatt Lewis, physician and author, first woman to receive an M.D. from Washington University School of Medicine
- Kenneth J. Meier, Charles Gregory Professor of Political Science, Texas A&M University
- Greg Mortenson, humanitarian and founder of the Central Asia Institute
- Al Neuharth, founder of USA Today and the Freedom Forum, former CEO of Gannett
- Pat O'Brien, television presenter
- Earl Rose, Dallas County medical examiner at the time of the assassination of John F. Kennedy
- Faith Spotted Eagle, Yankton Dakota counselor and activist
- Gene Vidal, athlete, aviation pioneer, New Deal official and father of Gore Vidal
- Anna Johnson Pell Wheeler, mathematician, known for her contributions to infinite dimensional linear algebra
- Abby Whiteside, piano teacher and theorist

== Faculty ==
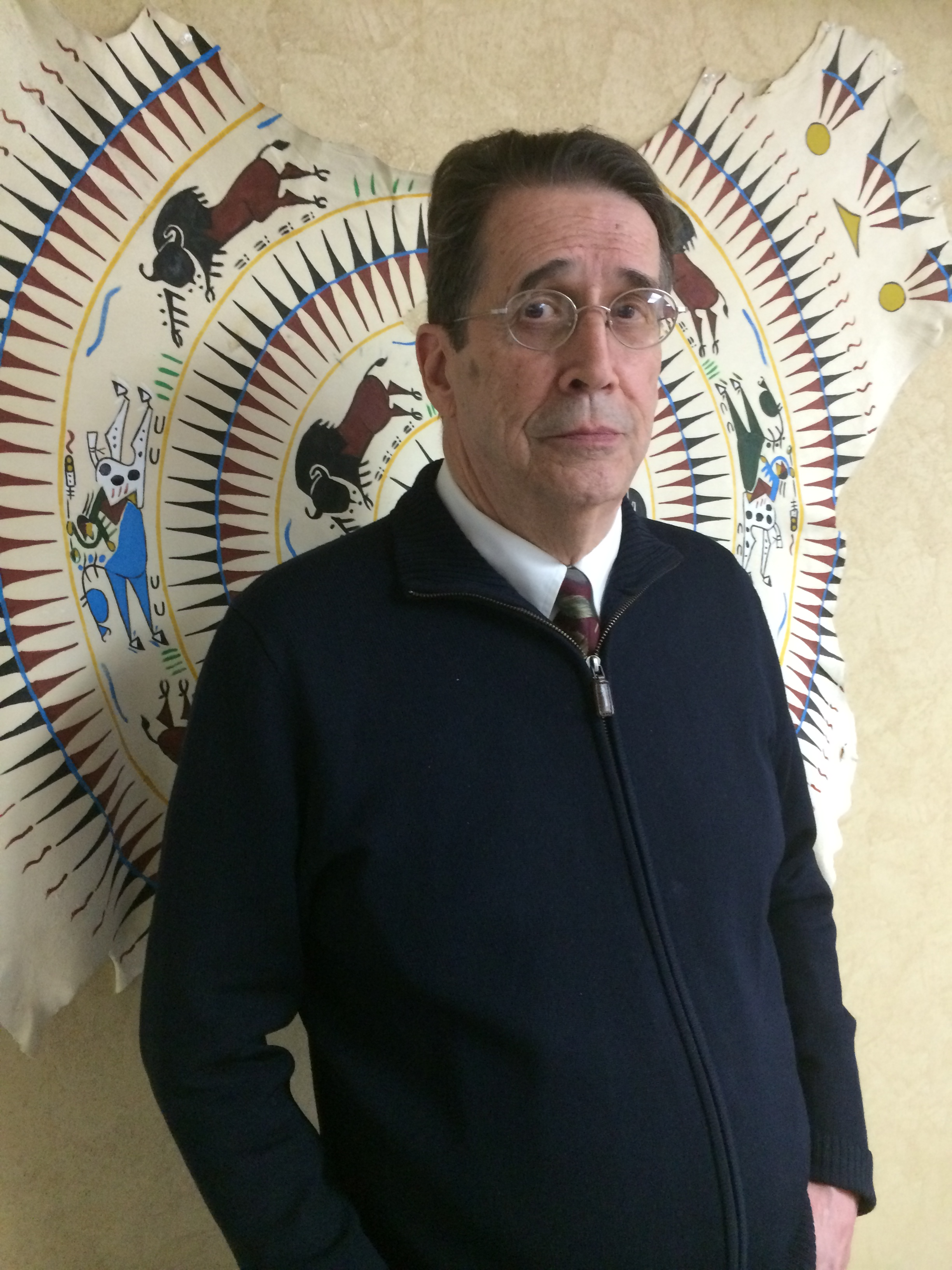
Frank Pommersheim

- Roger Baron, professor of law
- William O. Farber, former professor of political science
- Patrick Garry, professor of law
- Sheila Gestring, 18th president
- Oscar Howe, Native American painter
- Frank Pommersheim, professor of law

== See also ==
- South Dakota Coyotes
