= Pennies for Peace =

Humanitarian project benefiting central Asia

- Pennies for Peace
- Location: Bozeman, Montana
- Parent organization: Central Asia Institute
- Affiliations: Children's service-learning program of 501(C) 3 nonprofit Central Asia Institute
- Website: penniesforpeace.org
- Remarks: Started by students at Westside Elementary School, River Falls, Wisconsin USA who collected 62,340 pennies to help build a school in Pakistan - in 1994

Pennies for Peace is a program sponsored by Central Asia Institute, in which school children in the United States raise pennies to help fund CAI's educational projects. The program focuses on raising cross-cultural awareness through education to promote peace.

Pennies for Peace was founded in 1995 as "Pennies for Pakistan". The founders were two elementary school teachers, Susy Eisele and Sandy Heikkila, of the Westside Elementary School of River Falls, Wisconsin, US. They had been inspired by a talk given by Greg Mortenson on the harsh conditions he witnessed for all children in Korphe, Pakistan. The original effort raised $620 in pennies, which helped pay for materials to build a school in Korphe. The program was awarded the 1997 Richard Lewandowski Memorial Award for Humanitarian Activities, which was presented to Westside Elementary by the Wisconsin Education Association Council.

Pennies for Peace was launched by CAI executive director Greg Mortenson to help broaden students' awareness of the developing world, and teach them about their capacities to be philanthropists by raising funds to cover costs such as paper, pencils, books, uniforms and desks for students in remote northern Pakistan and Afghanistan.

By 2012, Pennies for Peace had raised over 16 million pennies ($160,000) generated by more than 700 schools across the United States.
