= Stones into Schools =

2009 book by Greg Mortenson

Stones Into Schools: Promoting Peace with Books, Not Bombs, in Afghanistan and Pakistan
- Cover photo of Stones Into Schools
- Author: Greg Mortenson
- Language: English
- Genre: Nonfiction/memoir
- Publisher: Viking Press
- Publication date: 2009
- Publication place: United States
- Media type: Hardcover
- Pages: 420
- ISBN: 978-0-8037-3687-0
- Preceded by: Three Cups of Tea

Stones into Schools: Promoting Peace with Books, Not Bombs, in Afghanistan and Pakistan is a New York Times bestselling book by Greg Mortenson published by Viking in 2009. The book is the sequel to the bestselling book Three Cups of Tea and tells the story of Mortenson's humanitarian efforts to build schools in Pakistan and Afghanistan with his non-profit charity organization, Central Asia Institute (CAI). CAI reports that as of 2010, it has overseen the building over 171 schools in the two countries. These schools reportedly provide education to over 64,000 children, including 54,000 girls, where few education opportunities existed before in the remote regions of Pakistan and Afghanistan.

== Summary ==
Stones into Schools picks up where Three Cups of Tea left off in late 2003. Tracing the efforts of CAI to work in the northeast corner of Afghanistan, the book describes how the book's author and Sarfraz Khan worked to establish the first schools in the area. Mortenson and Khan's efforts were thwarted for a time when a devastating earthquake hit the Azad Kashmir region of Pakistan. CAI assisted with relief efforts in the region by setting up temporary tent schools and later build several earthquake-proof schools. After CAI's relief efforts were completed, the non-profit charity organization then opens schools in areas controlled by the Taliban and Mortenson assists the US military to formulate strategic plans in the region.

== Advice solicited by US Military ==
Due to attention paid to Mortenson's books by their wives, US military leaders in Afghanistan have sought Mortenson's advice on how to work with the elders of local Afghan communities. Seeking his knowledge on dealing with Afghan elders, the military has also included Mortenson as an active participant in meetings between the elders and US military commanders. He has not accepted payment for his services, and also does not have a contractual or other formal relationship with the US military.

== Criticism ==
=== Allegations ===
On the April 17, 2011 broadcast of CBS News' 60 Minutes, correspondent Steve Kroft alleged inaccuracies in Stones into Schools and its prequel, Three Cups of Tea. In particular, CBS News disputed Mortenson's claim that he got lost near K2 and ended up in Korphe; that he was captured by the Taliban in 1996; whether the number of schools built and supported by CAI is accurate; and the propriety in the use of CAI funds for Mortenson's book tours. 60 Minutes asked Mortenson for an interview prior to their broadcast, but Mortenson did not respond to their requests.

Jon Krakauer, a former financial supporter of CAI, has also questioned Mortenson's accounts separately and was interviewed for the 60 Minutes segment. The day after the broadcast, Krakauer released his allegations in a lengthy online article, Three Cups of Deceit - How Greg Mortenson, Humanitarian Hero, Lost His Way.

Mansur Khan Mahsudhe, a tribesmen Greg Mortenson describes as a kidnapper in Stones into Schools, states he is "looking into how to sue" Greg Mortenson for what he claims are lies about him.

An inquiry by the Montana Attorney General determined that Mortenson had improperly used over $6 million of the organization's funds and he was ordered to repay $1 million; however, no criminal activity was discovered.

=== Response to allegations ===
In response to the allegations made against him and his books, Mortenson wrote a statement that was published in the Bozeman Chronicle: "I stand by the information conveyed in my book, and by the value of CAI's work in empowering local communities to build and operate schools that have educated more than 60,000 students." Mortenson further stated, "The time about our final days on K2 and ongoing journey to Korphe village and Skardu is a compressed version of events that took place in the fall of 1993..."

Scott Darsney, a respected mountaineer and friend of Greg Mortenson, wrote an email subsequently turned into an exclusive article for Outside magazine's online version as a response to the allegations against Mortenson. Darnsey questioned the accuracy and fairness of both the Krakauer piece and the 60 Minutes report. Darnsey had been interviewed by Krakauer, and maintained that Krakauer either misquoted or misunderstood what he said.

As a response to Krakauer's allegations, CAI produced a comprehensive list of projects completed over a period of years and projects CAI is currently working on. The list was released in December, 2011 (see external links below).
