= Cynthia Lindquist =

American academic administrator

- Ta'Sunka Wicahpi Win
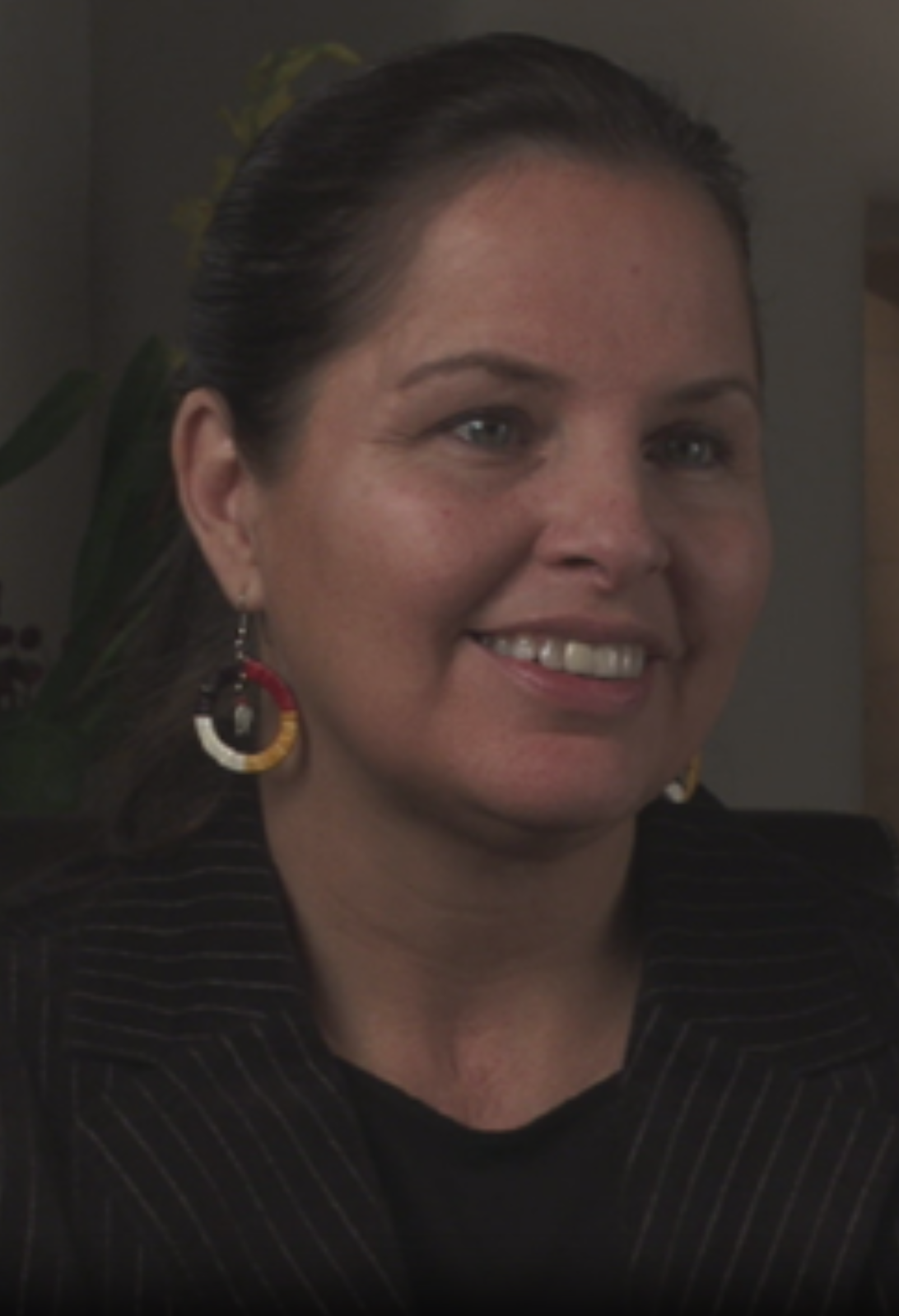
- Lindquist c. 2010

President of Cankdeska Cikana Community College
- In office October 2003 – August 2024

Personal details
- Born: Devils Lake, North Dakota, U.S.
- Citizenship: Spirit Lake Tribe; United States
- Children: 3
- Education: University of North Dakota (BA, PhD); University of South Dakota (MPA)

Cynthia A. Lindquist Mala (Dakota: Ta'Sunka Wicahpi Win), also known as Star Horse Woman, is an American educator and academic administrator specializing in Indigenous health and higher education. She is a member of the Spirit Lake Tribe. Lindquist served as the president of Cankdeska Cikana Community College (CCCC) from 2003 to 2024, where she expanded the campus and stabilized its accreditation. In January 2025, she was appointed as the director of Tribal Initiatives & Collaboration for the University of North Dakota (UND).

== Early life and education ==
Lindquist was born in Devils Lake, North Dakota, and is an enrolled member of the Spirit Lake Tribe. She is the oldest of 13 children and was raised on the Spirit Lake Reservation, partially by her grandparents, from whom she learned traditional ways. Her mother is Gloria Janet Jetty, who is Dakota, and her father was a Scandinavian police officer. Following her parents' divorce, Lindquist lived off the reservation with her father.

Lindquist earned a B.A. in Indian Studies and English from the University of North Dakota (UND) in 1981. She subsequently earned a Master of Public Administration (MPA) with an emphasis on Indian health systems from the University of South Dakota in 1988. While studying for her master's degree, she worked full-time and commuted 9 to 12 hours to Rapid City, South Dakota every two months for classes. In 2006, she completed a Ph.D. in Educational Leadership at the University of North Dakota as a Bush Foundation Leadership Fellow. Her doctoral dissertation was titled "Campus Racial Climate as Perceived by Undergraduate American Indian Students Attending the University of North Dakota." Lindquist's doctoral advisor was Margaret Healy.

== Career ==
=== Early career ===
After graduating from high school, Lindquist worked as a secretary clerk for the Sioux Manufacturing Corporation in Fort Totten, North Dakota. After earning her bachelor's degree, she returned to the company as a manager. She was subsequently appointed as the health director and planner for the Spirit Lake Tribe, a role she held for seven years.

Lindquist served as the executive director of the North Dakota Indian Affairs Commission, a cabinet-level position, during the administration of governor Ed Schafer in the 1990s. She also worked as a senior advisor to the director of the Indian Health Service (IHS) in Washington, D.C. During the Clinton administration, she became the first political appointee for the IHS, serving as the Chief of Staff to the Director. Additionally, she developed and wrote the Northern Plains Healthy Start initiative and is a founding member of the National Indian Women's Health Resource Center. In 1999, she was a recipient of the "Women in Government" award presented by Good Housekeeping. In 2002, she delivered a presentation on the Native American experience at the Association of Professional Chaplains conference, which was described in Chaplaincy Today as an "excellent" personal look at indigenous spirituality.

=== Cankdeska Cikana Community College ===
In 2003, Lindquist was recruited by two tribal elders to apply for the presidency of Cankdeska Cikana Community College (CCCC) in Fort Totten. When she assumed the presidency, the college was 18 months away from losing its accreditation. Under her leadership, the institution secured a 10-year accreditation, doubled its enrollment and graduation rates, and recorded 18 years of clean financial audits.

In 2004, U.S. president George W. Bush appointed Lindquist to the National Advisory Council on Indian Education (NACIE), where she served as chairwoman. She was appointed to the National Institutes of Health (NIH) Director's Council of Public Representatives. In March 2018, the American Indian College Fund named her the 2017 Tribal College and University Honoree of the Year.

Lindquist quadrupled the size of the CCCC campus during her tenure, overseeing the renovation and connection of buildings that were previously asbestos-filled federal facilities. She established a partnership with the University of North Dakota that secured a $900,000 grant from NASA to manufacture components for astronaut space suits at the college. Lindquist concluded her presidency at CCCC at the end of August 2024.

=== Later career ===
On January 21, 2025, Lindquist was named the director of Tribal Initiatives & Collaboration for the University of North Dakota. In this role, she is tasked with building trusting relationships with regional Tribal Nations and Colleges and leading the development of a new university policy regarding consultation with Tribal Nations.

== Personal life ==
Lindquist carries two Dakota names. Ta'Sunka Wicahpi Win (Star Horse Woman) was given to her by a Canadian medicine man in recognition of her national work with traditional medicine and the Indian Health Service. Her second name, Hoton Ho Waste Winyan (Good Voice or Good Talk Woman), was the name of her great-grandmother. She embraces both her Dakota and Scandinavian heritage, preparing traditional foods from both cultures. As of 2018, she had three children, eight grandchildren, and two great-grandchildren.
