= Harold J. Sykora =

United States Army general

Harold J. Sykora is a retired major general in the National Guard of the United States and former Adjutant General of South Dakota.

== Career ==
Sykora joined the National Guard in 1960. Assignments given to him included a detachment with the Wisconsin Army National Guard from 1971 to 1972. He held the position of Adjutant General of the South Dakota National Guard from 1988 until his retirement on May 3, 1998.

Awards he received include the Meritorious Service Medal with oak leaf cluster, the Army Commendation Medal with oak leaf cluster, the Army Achievement Medal, the Army Reserve Component Achievement Medal with silver oak leaf cluster, the National Defense Service Medal, the Armed Forces Reserve Medal with gold hourglass device, the Army Service Ribbon, and the Army Reserve Components Overseas Training Ribbon.

== Education ==
- B.S. - Education, University of South Dakota
- M.A. - Mathematics, University of South Dakota
