= Greg Mortenson =

American professional speaker, writer and former mountaineer

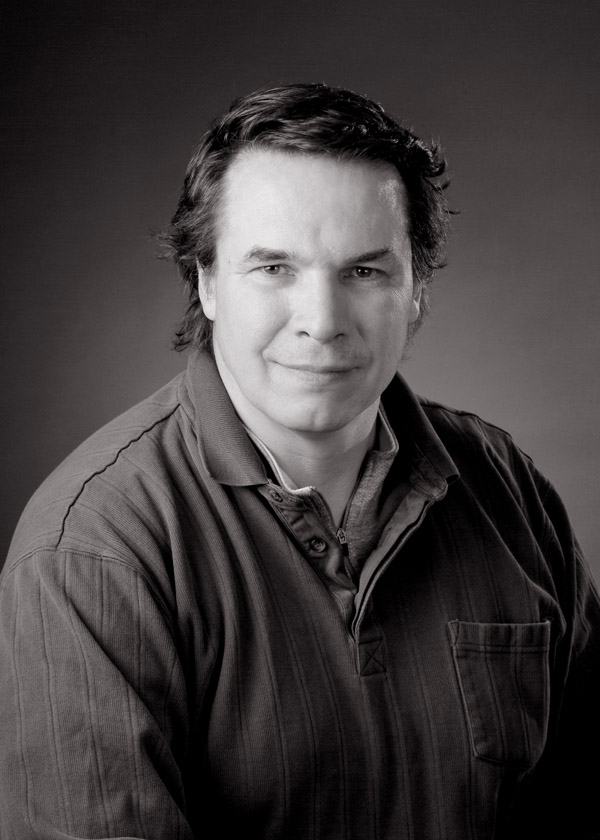
- Mortenson shown in 2005
- Born: St. Cloud, Minnesota, U.S.
- Education: University of South Dakota
- Occupations: Professional speaker; writer; veteran; mountaineer
- Spouse: Dr. Tara Bishop
- Parent(s): Irvin and Dr. Jerene Mortenson

Greg Mortenson is an American professional speaker, writer, alleged fraud, veteran, and former mountaineer. He is a co-founder and former executive director of the non-profit Central Asia Institute (CAI) and the founder of the educational charity Pennies for Peace.

Mortenson is the co-author of The New York Times Bestseller Three Cups of Tea and Stones into Schools: Promoting Peace with Books, Not Bombs, in Afghanistan and Pakistan.

Mortenson was accused of financial irregularities in handling donations to the CAI and falsehoods in his books. In 2012, Mortenson repaid $1 million to the CAI after an inquiry by the Montana Attorney General. The inquiry determined that he had improperly used over $6 million of the organization's funds; however, no criminal activity was discovered.

== Early life ==
Mortenson was born in St. Cloud, Minnesota. His parents, Irvin and Jerene, went with the Lutheran Church to Tanganyika (now Tanzania) in 1958 to be teachers at a girls' school in the Usambara mountains. In 1961, Irvin became a fundraiser and development director for the Kilimanjaro Christian Medical Center, the first teaching hospital in Tanzania. Jerene was the founding principal of International School Moshi. Spending his early childhood and adolescence in Tanzania, Mortenson learned to speak fluent Swahili.

In the early 1970s, when he was 15 years old, Mortenson and his family left Tanzania and moved back to Minnesota. From 1973 to 1975, he attended Ramsey High School in Roseville, Minnesota, from which he graduated.

After high school, Mortenson served in the U.S. Army in Germany from 1975 to 1977 and was awarded the Army Commendation Medal. Following his discharge, he attended Concordia College in Moorhead, Minnesota, from 1977 to 1979 on an athletic (football) scholarship.

In 1978, Concordia College's football team won the NAIA Division III national championship with a 7–0 win over Findlay, Ohio. Mortenson graduated from the University of South Dakota in 1983 with a bachelor's degree in liberal studies and an associate degree in nursing.

== Humanitarian work and career ==
=== Origins in K2 ===
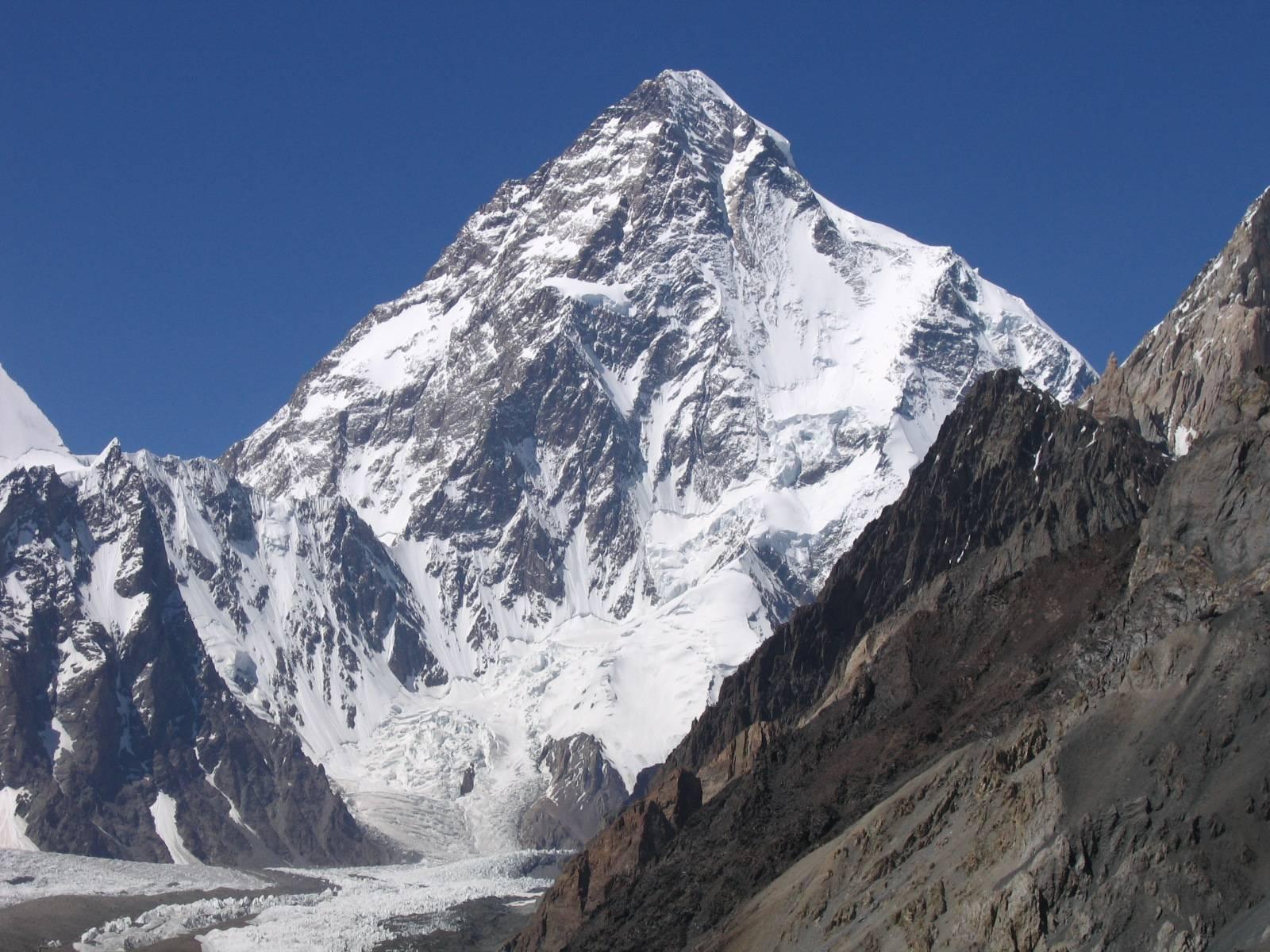
K2

Mortenson describes the origins of his humanitarian work in his best-selling book Three Cups of Tea. He states he traveled to northern Pakistan in 1993 to climb the world's second-highest mountain, K2, as a memorial to his sister, Christa. After more than 70 days on the mountain, located in the Karakoram range, Mortenson failed to reach the summit. Earlier, Mortenson and fellow climber Scott Darsney were also involved in a 75-hour life-saving rescue of another climber, Etienne Fine, which put them in a weakened state. After the rescue, he descended the mountain and set out with a local Balti porter, Mouzafer Ali, to the nearest city.

According to the account in Three Cups of Tea, Mortenson stated he took a wrong turn on the trail and ended up in the small village of Korphe. Physically exhausted, ill, and alone at the time of his arrival there, Mortenson was cared for by some of Korphe's residents while he recovered. As a gesture of gratitude to the community for their assistance to him, Mortenson said he would build a school for the village after he noticed local students attending school in an outdoor location and writing out their lessons in the dirt.

Mortenson has since admitted in a 2011 interview that the timing in the Korphe account in Three Cups of Tea is inaccurate, and that the events actually took place long after his descent from K2, over a longer period of time and during separate trips.

=== Literacy in Central Asia ===
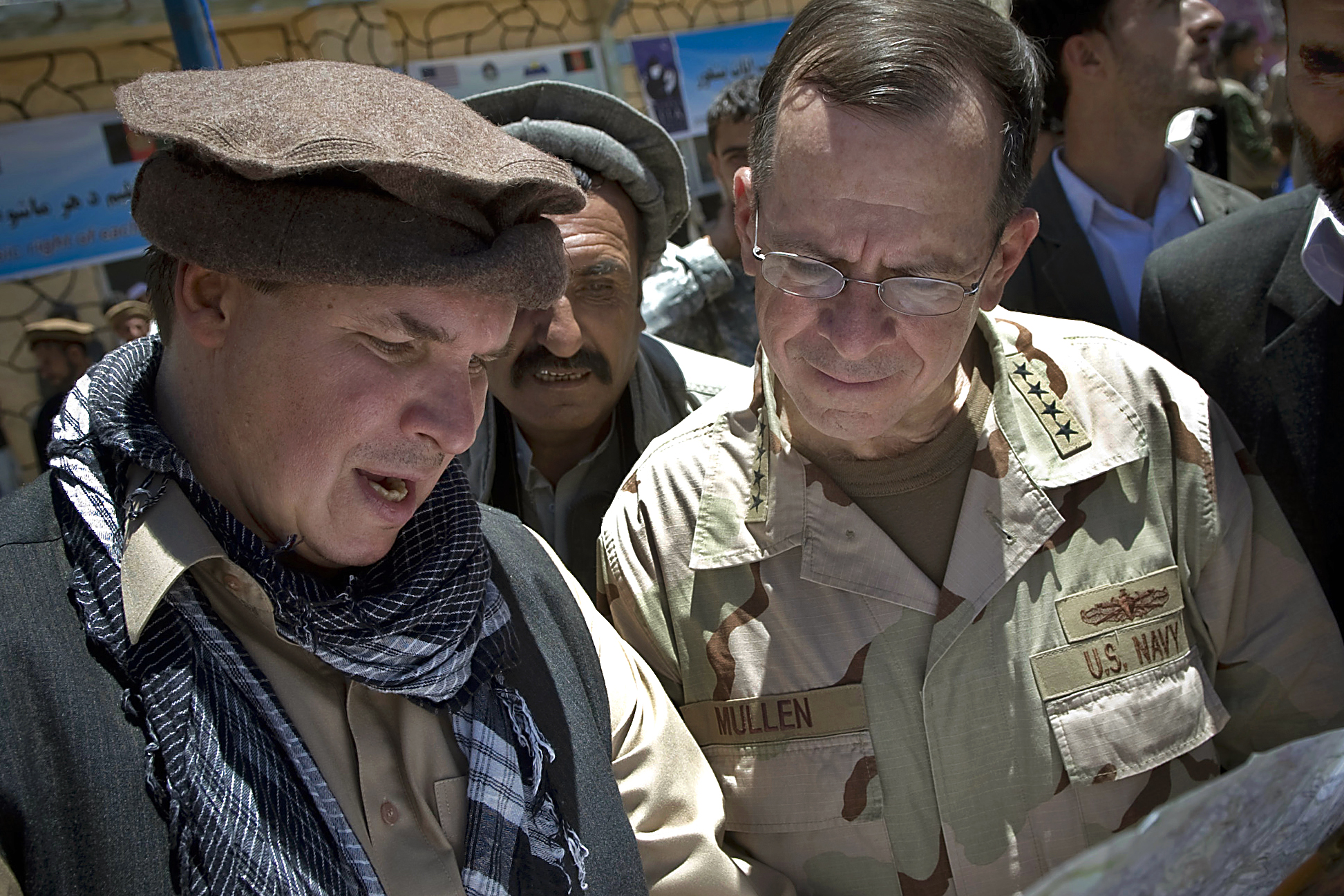
Mortenson and Mike Mullen in Afghanistan in 2009

Mortenson has written and spoken widely about the importance of education and literacy for girls worldwide. He has further stated that girls' education is the most important investment all countries can make to create stability, bring socio-economic reform, decrease infant mortality and population explosion, and improve health, hygiene, and sanitation standards. His view is that "fighting terrorism" perpetuates a cycle of violence whereas there should instead be a global priority to "promote peace" through education and literacy with an emphasis on educating girls.

Three Cups of Tea describes his travels in Pakistan's North-West Frontier Province, including his escape from a 2003 firefight between Afghan opium warlords, his subjection to two fatwās by conservative Islamist clerics for educating girls, and his receiving hate mail and threats from fellow Americans for helping educate Muslim children.

According to op-ed columnist and Mortenson friend Nicholas D. Kristof, the schools built by CAI have local support and have been able to avoid retribution by the Taliban and other groups opposed to girls' education because of community "buy-in", which involves getting villages to donate land, subsidized or free labor ("sweat equity"), wood and resources.

As of 2014, CAI reports it has established or significantly supported over 300 projects, including 191 schools, in rural and often volatile regions of Pakistan, Afghanistan, and Tajikistan.

== Central Asia Institute ==
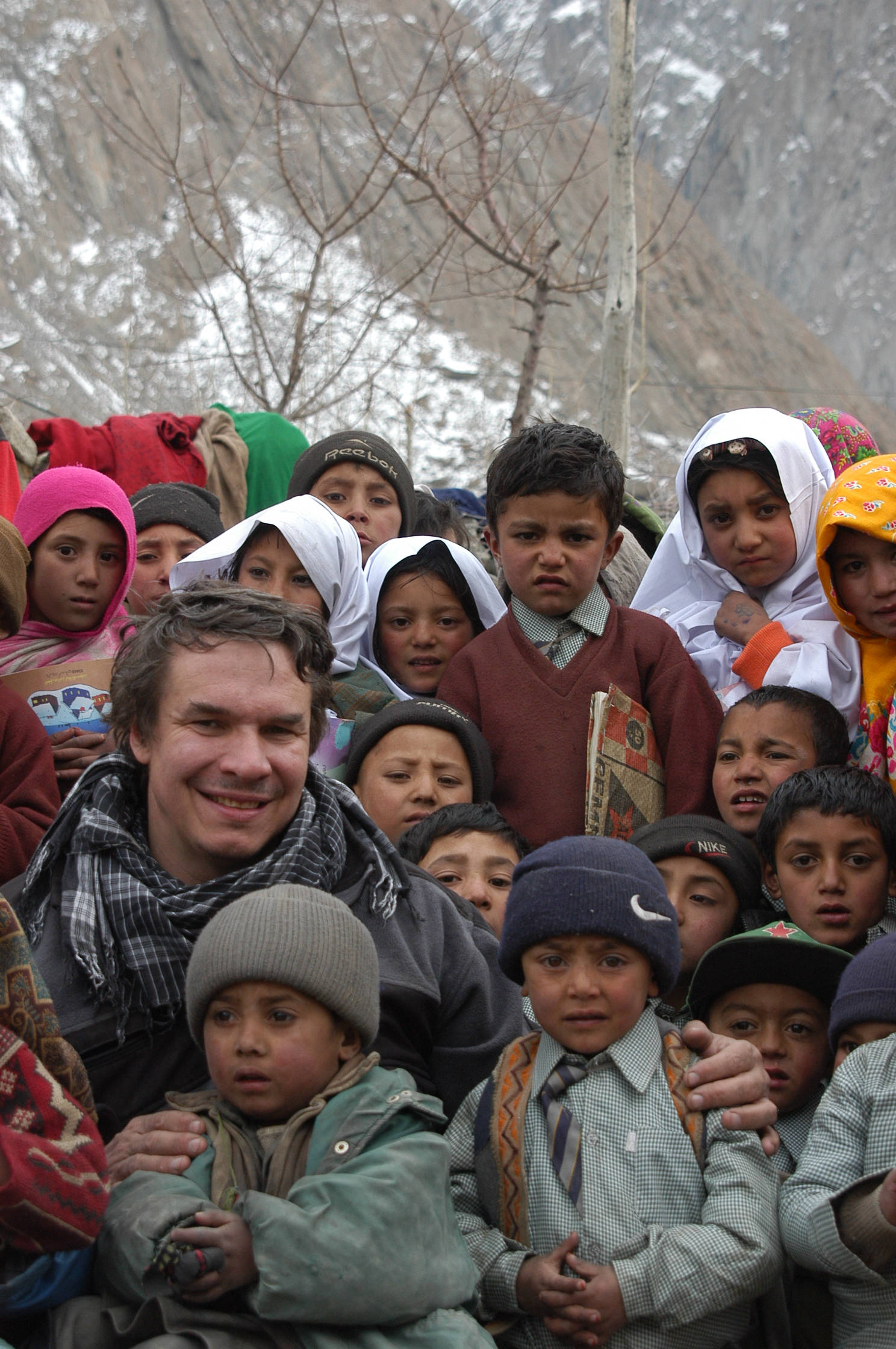
Mortenson with children in Pakistan in 2006

After experiencing frustration in his efforts to raise money for the school, Mortenson persuaded Silicon Valley computer pioneer Jean Hoerni to fund the building of the Korphe school.

Hoerni, who was critically ill at the time, formed the Central Asia Institute so that he and others could make tax-exempt donations to support Mortenson's work, and Mortenson became its first executive director. The mission of the non-profit organization is to promote education and literacy, especially for girls, in remote mountain regions of Pakistan and Afghanistan.

From 2006 through 2011, Greg Mortenson promoted his book as well as fundraising and promoting girls' education through public speaking events at schools throughout the United States. Travel expenses for his speaking engagements were paid for by the Central Asia Institute through the end of 2010. Mortenson personally kept the money received in exchange for his service as a public speaker as well as royalties from the sale of his book. In 2009, the total cost of his book promotion, fundraising, and awareness building for girls education paid for by CAI amounted to $4.6 million.

In April 2012, after a year-long investigation by the Montana attorney general, Mortenson agreed to repay $1 million to the CAI. The Montana inquiry had found that he had misspent over $6 million of the organization's money, although no criminality was found. Montana Attorney General Steve Bullock said: "Mr Mortenson may not have intentionally deceived the board or his employees, but his disregard for and attitude about basic record-keeping and accounting for his activities essentially had the same effect."

Bullock also wrote in the report that "CAI's mission is worthwhile and important," and "[i]ts accomplishments, driven by the vision and dedication of Mortenson, are significant—as even their harshest critics acknowledge."

Under the terms of the settlement agreement, Mortenson was required to resign as executive director and could no longer serve as a voting member of CAI's board. However, he was allowed to remain with CAI as an employee. Mortenson broke all of his remaining ties to CAI by officially retiring from the organization in 2015.

== Books ==
Mortenson and David Oliver Relin are co-authors of the New York Times bestselling book Three Cups of Tea. Listen to the Wind, a 32-page book Young Reader's version of Three Cups of Tea for ages 4–8, was written by Greg Mortenson and illustrated by Susan Roth. It was a New York Times bestseller for 97 weeks. As detailed in a New York Times article, Relin "suffered emotionally and financially as basic facts in the book were called into question" and ultimately committed suicide on November 15, 2012. In 2009, Stones into Schools: Promoting Peace with Books, Not Bombs, in Afghanistan and Pakistan was written by Greg Mortenson as a sequel to Three Cups of Tea.

== Controversies ==
Mortenson has been criticized by writers such as Peter Hessler and Jon Krakauer for financial mismanagement of his charity, for "dodging accountability" and for writing a book Krakauer described as "riddled with lies".

In April 2011, 60 Minutes and author Jon Krakauer accused Mortenson of fabrication in his non-fiction books and of financial improprieties at his charity Central Asia Institute.

After a one-year investigation, Montana Attorney General Steve Bullock reached a settlement with Mortenson in which he agreed not to file criminal charges but sought restitution for book royalties, speaking and travel fees, promotional costs, and inappropriate personal bills that Mortenson charged to the CAI. The reports stated, “Despite policies that committed him to do so, Mortenson failed to make contributions to CAI equal to the royalties he earned on the books the organization purchased. Nor did he and CAl devise an equitable way to split the costs to advertise and promote the book, which was required by his 2008 employment agreement. Mortenson also accepted travel fees from event sponsors at the same time that CAI was paying his travel costs. Moreover, he had significant lapses in judgment resulting in money donated to CAI being spent on personal items such as charter flights for family vacations, clothing and internet downloads.” Under the terms of a settlement with Bullock, Mortenson agreed to reinstate $1 million to the charity, which included credits for repayments already made. In October 2013, Mortenson completed the repayments to CAI, fulfilling the terms of the 2012 settlement with Bullock.

=== 60 Minutes and Jon Krakauer ===
On the April 17, 2011, broadcast of CBS News' 60 Minutes, correspondent Steve Kroft alleged inaccuracies in Mortenson's books Three Cups of Tea and its sequel Stones into Schools: Promoting Peace with Books, Not Bombs, in Afghanistan and Pakistan as well as financial improprieties in the operation of the Central Asia Institute.

60 Minutes made the following allegations:

- The story recounted in Stones into Schools about Mortenson's capture by the Taliban did not occur. In fact, he was shown great respect and hospitality, consistent with the Pashtunwali values of his hosts.
- Among the schools that Central Asia Institute claimed to have established, some were never built, some were abandoned, some were being used for other purposes, and others were not supported by CAI after they were built.
- The amount of money Central Asia Institute was spending to cover Mortenson's promotional and travel expenses was excessive.

60 Minutes asked Mortenson for an interview prior to their broadcast. Mortenson did not respond to their requests; however, he answered their questions in writing. Mortenson refused to talk to Steve Kroft, and reportedly the CAI staff requested that the hotel hosting the 60 Minutes crew asked them to leave the facility. Mortenson also canceled the speaking engagement that was scheduled that afternoon in the Atlanta convention facility.

In an April 2011 Outside magazine interview, Greg Mortenson insisted that Krakauer contacted him only once and inaccurately claimed that he had been trying to get hold of him for some time. He claimed that although he arranged to meet with Krakauer, the interview was eventually cancelled "once I realized how deep and dirty this whole thing was".

Mortenson wrote the following statement in response to the allegations against him that were published in the Bozeman Chronicle: "I stand by the information conveyed in my book, and by the value of CAI's work in empowering local communities to build and operate schools that have educated more than 60,000 students" and added, "The time about our final days on K2 and ongoing journey to Korphe village and Skardu is a compressed version of events that took place in the fall of 1993...." However, writing for Outside Online, Grayson Schaffer investigated Mortenson's claims regarding Korphe and found them likely spurious, as there was no plausible way for Mortenson to have ended up in Korphe while descending K2 in the route he claimed. Additionally, Schaffer concludes that there is no evidence that Mortenson was actually an accomplished Himalayan climber, even though he claimed to have climbed six Himalayan peaks.

Jon Krakauer, a former financial supporter of CAI, questioned Mortenson's accounts of his exploits independently and was interviewed for the 60 Minutes segment mentioned above. The day after the broadcast, Krakauer released his own allegations in a lengthy online article, Three Cups of Deceit: How Greg Mortenson, Humanitarian Hero, Lost His Way. Krakauer explored financial improprieties at CAI in great detail, reporting that a former board treasurer had left the organization because "Greg regards CAI as his personal ATM," routinely charged personal expenses to the organization, and rarely provided any receipts or documentation.

In response to Krakauer's allegations, CAI produced a comprehensive 'Master Project List' on work CAI had completed or was then working on. The list was released in December 2011.

In April 2013 Krakauer wrote a follow-up article for The Daily Beast in which he stated that an audit of CAI's overseas projects indicated that the charity was still "beset by widespread corruption" and that Mortenson remaining as the public face of the charity was not "in the best interest of the charity or the people it serves". He concluded that "anyone thinking about donating to CAI should probably reconsider".

In January 2014, Mortenson was interviewed on Today by Tom Brokaw. He apologized and acknowledged that he had let a lot of people down, saying: "I failed in many ways, and it's an important lesson."

=== Lawsuits ===
In May 2011, Jean Price and Michele Reinhart, along with Dan Donovan, a Great Falls attorney, filed a class action lawsuit against Mortenson on behalf of readers, asking federal judge James Malloy in Missoula to place all proceeds from the purchases of Mortenson's books into a trust to be used for humanitarian purposes. Several named plaintiffs dropped the lawsuit after confessing they had never read the books. The lawsuit was dismissed with prejudice in federal court in May 2012. U.S. District Judge Sam Haddon chided the plaintiffs for presenting arguments that he called imprecise, flimsy, and speculative. An appeals suit was dropped by the 9th District Federal Circuit Court on October 10, 2013.

On October 6, 2013, after a lengthy lawsuit filed by Central Asia Institute, Philadelphia Insurance Company was ordered by Magistrate Judge Jeremy Lynch to repay Central Asia Institute $1.2 million to pay for legal costs involved in the lawsuits and investigations.

In May 2015, the Montana Attorney General stated that Central Asia Institute and Mortenson had completed the terms of a three-year compliance monitoring period, and CAI stated that the IRS had completed its examination of the nonprofit. The organization reported that it was having a return of donors and rise in contributions.

=== 3000 Cups of Tea ===
Jennifer Jordan and Jeff Rhoads rebutted the claims against Mortenson in their 2016 documentary 3000 Cups of Tea. In the film and through interviews Jordan argued that the accusations against Mortenson put forward by 60 Minutes and Jon Krakauer were largely not true and that both failed to do adequate research and source verification.

Jordan said in 2014: "Yes, Greg is a bad manager and accountant, and he is the first to admit that, but he is also a tireless humanitarian with a crucially important mission."

== Recognition ==
=== Awards ===
- 2003 Al Neuharth Free Spirit of the Year Award for building schools for Pakistani girls.
- 2008 Citizen Center for Diplomacy National Award for Citizen Diplomacy
- 2008 Courage of Conscience Award
- 2008 Graven Award – Wartburg College, IA
- 2008 Mary Lockwood Founders Medal For Education – Daughters of The American Revolution
- 2008 Sword of Loyola, St. Louis University, MO
- 2008 Charles Eliot Educator Award – New England Association of Schools & Colleges
- 2009 Academy of Achievement Award
- 2009 Sitara-e-Pakistan (The Star of Pakistan medal)
- 2009 Archon Award – Sigma Theta Tau International (Nursing Award)
- 2009 Austin College Leadership Award, Sherman TX – life work to take courageous stand on education issues for peace
- 2009 National Education Association (NEA) Human & Civil Rights Award
- 2009 City College San Francisco Amicus Collegii Award – Promoting peace through education
- 2009 S. Roger Horchow Award for Greatest Public Service by a Private Citizen (Jefferson Award), Carnegie Endowment & Harvard Kennedy School of Government
- 2009 U.S. News & World Report: America's Top 20 Best Leaders 2009
- 2009 Italy: Premio Gambrinus "Giuseppe Mazzotti"
- 2010 Loyola Marymount University (CA) – Doshi Bridgebuilder Of Peace Award
- 2010 The Common Wealth Awards: For Public Service
- 2010 The Salem Award for Human Rights – Salem News
- 2010 The Christopher Award: "To affirm the highest values of the human spirit"
- 2010 The 10th annual Lantern Award "Excellence in Education Innovation" (MOSTE – LA, CA)
- 2010 Distinguished Service To Education Award: National Elementary School Principals Association
- 2010 Creativity Foundation & Smithsonian Institution: Benjamin Franklin Laureate Award For Public Service
- 2010 Literature To Life Award – American Place Theater
- 2010 Viking Award – Norway House for pursuit of hard, bold, dangerous and important undertakings
- 2010 Freedom Award – America's Freedom Festival at Provo, for extraordinary devotion to the cause of liberty at home and abroad
- 2010 American Peace Award – representing the spirit of world peace through thoughts and actions
- 2010 The Mason Award – Extraordinary contribution in literature (George Mason University DC)
- 2011 Gelett Burgess Children's Book Award Three Cups of Tea Young Reader's Edition
- 2011 Presidential Award for Leadership in Social Change – Walden University
- 2011 Raoul Wallenberg Award for humanitarian endeavors – Old Dominion Univ., VA

=== Honorary degrees ===
- Frostburg State University, Frostburg, MD 2006
- Concordia College, Moorhead, MN 2007
- Montana State University, MT 2008
- Villanova University, PA 2008
- University of San Francisco, CA 2008
- University of Washington – Bothell, WA 2008
- Lewis & Clark College, OR 2008
- Colby College, ME 2009
- Simmons College, MA 2009
- Saint Louis University, MO 2009
- Loyola University Chicago, IL 2009
- University of Pennsylvania, PA 2010
- Brookdale College, Lincroft, NJ 2010
- University of Colorado, Colorado Springs 2010
- Stevenson University (MD) 2010
- Wittenberg University (OH) 2010

== Published works ==
- Akiner, Shirin; Tidemen, Sander (1998). Sustainable Development In Central Asia. Curzon Press. ISBN 0-312-21931-8.
- Jones, Karen; Mortenson, Greg (2005). The Difference A Day Makes. New World Library. ISBN 1-57731-475-1.
- Mortenson, Greg; Relin, David Oliver (2006). Three Cups of Tea: One Man's Mission to Promote Peace...One School at a Time. Penguin Group. ISBN 0-670-03482-7.
- Mortenson, Greg; (with illustrator) Roth, Susan (January 22, 2009). Listen To The Wind (children's picturebook). Dial. ISBN 978-0-8037-3058-8.
- Mortenson, Greg; Relin, David Oliver, adapted by Sarah Thomson (January 22, 2009). Three Cups of Tea: The Young Reader's Edition. Dial. ISBN 978-0-8037-3392-3.
- Mortenson, Greg (December 1, 2009). Stones into Schools: Promoting Peace with Books, Not Bombs, in Afghanistan and Pakistan. Viking. ISBN 978-0-670-02115-4.

== Personal life ==
Mortenson lives in Bozeman, Montana, with his wife, Tara Bishop (the daughter of Barry Bishop), a clinical psychologist, and their two children, Amira and Khyber. In 2011, Mortenson was diagnosed with hypoxia and had surgery for an aneurysm and an atrial septal defect, an event which exactly coincided with the airing of the 60 Minutes expose and the release of Krakauer's accompanying book.
