= Three Cups of Tea =

2006 book by Greg Mortenson and David Oliver Relin

- Cover of Three Cups of Tea
- Author: Greg Mortenson and David Oliver Relin
- Language: English
- Genre: Memoir
- Publisher: Penguin Group
- Publication date: 2006, 2007, 2008
- Publication place: United States
- Media type: Hardcover, Paperback, Audio CD
- Pages: 368
- ISBN: 978-0-14-303825-2
- OCLC: 83299454
- Followed by: Stones into Schools

Three Cups of Tea: One Man's Mission to Promote Peace ... One School at a Time (original hardcover title: Three Cups of Tea: One Man's Mission to Fight Terrorism and Build Nations ... One School at a Time) is a memoir book by Greg Mortenson and David Oliver Relin published by Penguin in 2007. The book describes Mortenson's transition from a registered nurse and mountain climber to a humanitarian committed to reducing poverty and elevating education for girls in Pakistan and Afghanistan. Following the beginnings of his humanitarian efforts, Mortenson co-founded the Central Asia Institute (CAI), a non-profit group that has reported overseeing the construction of over 171 schools as of 2010. CAI reported that these schools provide education to over 64,000 children, including 54,000 girls, in the remote regions of Pakistan and Afghanistan, where few education opportunities previously existed.

The book's title was inspired by a saying Haji Ali shared with Mortenson: "The first time you share tea with a Balti, you are a stranger. The second time you take tea, you are an honored guest. The third time you share a cup of tea, you become family..." Three Cups of Tea remained on the New York Times nonfiction bestseller's list for four years.

In April 2011, critiques and challenges of the book and Mortenson surfaced. Author Jon Krakauer alleged that a number of Mortenson's claims in the book are fictitious and accused him of mismanaging CAI funds. In 2012, Mortenson agreed to repay $1 million to CAI following an investigation by the Montana attorney general. The inquiry determined that he had misspent over $6 million of the organization's money, although no criminality was found.

== Summary ==
In 1993, mountaineer Greg Mortenson attempted to climb K2, the world's second highest mountain, located in the Karakoram range of Gilgit-Baltistan, as a way of honoring the memory of his deceased sister, Christa. As a memorial, he had planned to lay her amber necklace on the mountain's summit. After more than 70 days on the mountain, Mortenson and three other climbers had their ascent interrupted by the need to complete a 75-hour life-saving rescue of a fifth climber. Mortenson became lost while descending alone, and became weak and exhausted. Instead of arriving in Askole, where his porters awaited, he came across Korphe, a small village built on a shelf jutting out from a canyon. He was greeted and taken in by the chief elder of Korphe, Haji Ali.

Mortenson soon found out that the village had no school. To repay the remote community for their hospitality, Mortenson recounted in the book that he promised to build a school for the village. After difficulties in raising capital, Mortenson was introduced to Jean Hoerni, a Silicon Valley pioneer who donated the money that Mortenson needed for his school. In the last months of his life, Hoerni co-founded the Central Asia Institute with Mortenson, endowing the CAI to build schools in rural Pakistan and Afghanistan.

According to the book, Mortenson faced many daunting challenges in his quest to raise funds for the building of more than 55 schools in Taliban territory. Some of these challenges included death threats from Islamic mullahs, long periods of separation from his family, and being kidnapped by Taliban sympathizers.

== Authorship ==
Though Mortenson and Relin are given equal credit for authoring Three Cups of Tea, it is written from Relin's perspective as a journalist interviewing and observing Mortenson. In the introduction, Relin admitted that his desire to see Mortenson's project succeed likely influenced his objectivity as a reporter. Elizabeth Kaplan, the agent for the book, later acknowledged that the relationship between Mortenson and Relin was difficult. Mortenson, who was often traveling, was hard to track down, and Relin spoke publicly about how Mortenson should not have been named a co-author. As detailed in a New York Times article, Relin "suffered emotionally and financially as basic facts in the book were called into question" and later committed suicide on November 15, 2012.

== Publication ==
The original hardback edition of the book was released in 2006 with the subtitle One Man's Mission to Fight Terrorism One School at a Time. Mortenson fought against this subtitle, and the edition sold only 20,000 copies. He continued to prevail upon the publishers to change the subtitle to his first choice for the 2007 paperback edition: One Man's Mission to Promote Peace One School at a Time. His publisher relented, and the re-titled book made the New York Times nonfiction paperback bestseller list. Mortenson explained his reasoning for the subtitle in a lecture given in Fairfield, Connecticut: "If you just fight terrorism, it's based in fear. If you promote peace, it's based in hope."

The book remained a number one New York Times bestseller for three years after its release. The book has been published in over 39 countries. A young adult version of Three Cups of Tea was published by Penguin on January 22, 2009.

== Reception ==
=== Praise ===
In 2010, South Asian scholar and anthropologist Nosheen Ali wrote regarding Three Cups of Tea: “Let me state clearly that Three Cups of Tea illuminates a remarkable tale of courage and compassion. Like numerous readers, I too am deeply moved and inspired by Mortenson’s genuine and enduring devotion to the cause of education in Northern Pakistan and Afghanistan.”

=== Criticism ===
In regard to Mortenson's management style at the Central Asia Institute, Nicholas D. Kristof, formerly a supporter, said that Mortenson is "utterly disorganized", and added, "I am deeply troubled that only 41 percent of the money raised in 2009 went to build schools." In a deeper look into Mortenson's business dealings, British journalist Jonathan Foreman wrote in a 2008 Daily Telegraph story that CAI's success was due in part to Mortenson's use of intuition and last-minute decision-making. Foreman explained that Mortenson was habitually late for meetings but that those traits worked well and were important to the success of his work in the Balti region of Pakistan. Baltistanis have no tenses in their language, are vague on their timekeeping, and make their own decisions largely based on intuition.

=== Allegations ===
On the April 17, 2011, broadcast of CBS News' 60 Minutes, correspondent Steve Kroft alleged inaccuracies in Three Cups of Tea and its sequel, Stones into Schools: Promoting Peace with Books, Not Bombs, in Afghanistan and Pakistan, as well as financial improprieties in the operation of the Central Asia Institute. The 60 Minutes report made the following allegations:

- Some of the events recounted in Three Cups of Tea, including Mortenson getting lost on the way down from K2, stumbling into Korphe, and promising to build a school, did not take place.
- The story recounted in Stones into Schools about Mortenson's capture by the Taliban did not occur. His purported kidnappers state he was a guest, and the Taliban did not exist in the country at that time.
- Schools that the Central Asia Institute claims to have built either have not been built, have been built and abandoned, are used for other purposes such as grain storage, or have not been supported by CAI after they were built.
- The amount of money Central Asia Institute spends on advertising Mortenson's books and paying the travel expenses of his speaking tours, including hiring private jets, is excessive relative to other comparable charitable institutions.

60 Minutes asked Mortenson for an interview before their broadcast, but he did not respond to their requests.

Jon Krakauer, a former financial supporter of CAI, questioned Mortenson's accounts separately and was interviewed for the 60 Minutes segment. The day after the broadcast, Krakauer published his allegations in a lengthy online article, Three Cups of Deceit — How Greg Mortenson, Humanitarian Hero, Lost His Way. In the article, Krakauer documents how he had been captivated by Mortenson's story and donated substantial sums to CAI, but subsequently heard stories of misconduct and began investigating. Krakauer stated that he invited Mortenson to address his allegations and scheduled an interview where Mortenson lives, but Mortenson canceled the interview.

=== Responses ===
Interviewed by the Bozeman Chronicle a few days after the 60 Minutes exposé, Mortenson told reporter Gail Schonztler: "I stand by the information conveyed in my book, and by the value of CAI's work in empowering local communities to build and operate schools that have educated more than 60,000 students." He further explained, "The time about our final days on K2 and ongoing journey to Korphe village and Skardu is a compressed version of events that took place in the fall of 1993..."

Scott Darsney, a respected mountaineer and friend of Greg Mortenson, sent an email, subsequently turned into an exclusive article for the online version of Outside magazine, as a response to the allegations against Mortenson. Darsney questioned the accuracy and fairness of both the Krakauer piece and the 60 Minutes report. Darsney had been interviewed by Krakauer, and maintained that Krakauer either misquoted or misunderstood what he said.

CAI responded to the various media reports with a public statement, saying the board had retained an attorney the previous year to investigate whether Mortenson received "excess benefits" for his work, and that counsel had concluded this was not the case. The statement concluded, "It would be truly tragic if the sensationalized allegations against him were to harm the future of this crucial work." In December 2011 CAI released a comprehensive list of projects completed over several years and currently in progress.

In April 2012, following a year of investigation by the Montana attorney general, Mortenson agreed to repay $1 million to the CAI. The Montana inquiry determined that he had misspent over $6 million of the organization's money, although no criminality was found. Montana Attorney General Steve Bullock said: "Mr Mortenson may not have intentionally deceived the board or his employees, but his disregard for and attitude about basic record-keeping and accounting for his activities essentially had the same effect." Under the terms of the settlement agreement, Mortenson was required to resign as executive director and could no longer serve as a voting member of CAI's board. However, he was allowed to remain with CAI as an employee. Mortenson broke all of his remaining ties to CAI by officially retiring from the organization in 2015.

=== Lawsuits ===
In May 2011, Jean Price and Michele Reinhart, Democratic Party representatives in Montana, along with Dan Donovan, a Great Falls attorney, filed a class-action lawsuit against Mortenson and asked a federal judge in Missoula to place all proceeds from the purchase of Mortenson's books into a trust to be used for humanitarian purposes. The total of Mortenson's book sales then stood near $5 million. In June 2011, Price dropped out of the suit because she had never bought the book. In Illinois, former school teacher Deborah Netter dropped her Illinois lawsuit against Mortenson in early July 2011, and joined the Montana lawsuit in mid-July. The Montana lawsuit was dismissed on April 30, 2012. In October 2013, an appeal of the dismissal of the class-action lawsuit claiming damages against Greg Mortenson over Three Cups of Tea was rejected by the 9th Circuit Court of Appeals.

== Awards ==
- Kiriyama Prize
- Time Magazine Asia Book of The Year
- Pacific Northwest Booksellers Association – Nonfiction Award
- Montana Honor Book Award
- Borders Bookstore Original Voices Selection
- Banff Mountain Festival Book Award Finalist
- 2007 Nonfiction Runner-Up for the Dayton Literary Peace Prize
- People Magazine – Critics Choice
- Publishers Weekly – Starred Review
- 2009 Italy: Premio Gambrinus “Giuseppe Mazzotti"
- Powell Book's Puddly Award (nonfiction), Portland
- 2010 The Christopher Award: "To affirm the highest values of the human spirit"
- 2010 The Mason Award - Extraordinary contribution in literature (George Mason University DC)

== Editions ==
- 2006, Three Cups of Tea: One Man's Mission to Fight Terrorism One School at a Time. 1st Edition. Viking Press. ISBN 978-0-670-03482-6. Hardcover.
- 2007, Three Cups of Tea: One Man's Mission to Promote Peace…One School at a Time. Tantor Media. ISBN 978-1-4001-5251-3. (Audio MP3 CD).
- 2007, Three Cups of Tea: One Man's Mission to Promote Peace…One School at a Time. Penguin Books Ltd. ISBN 978-0-14-303825-2. Paperback.
- 2009, Three Cups of Tea: One Man's Journey to Change The World…One Child at a Time (Young Adult Book). Mortenson, Greg; Relin, David Oliver; signature by Amira Mortenson, foreword by Jane Goodall. Puffin. ISBN 0-14-241412-3.
- 2009, Listen To The Wind: The Story of Dr. Greg and Three Cups of Tea, (Children's book). Mortenson, Greg; Roth, Susan – illustrator. Dial Books. ISBN 978-0-8037-3058-8.

== Sequel ==
A sequel to Three Cups of Tea, titled Stones into Schools: Promoting Peace With Books, Not Bombs, In Afghanistan and Pakistan , was released on December 1, 2009, by Viking Press. Stones Into Schools explores the progress of Mortenson's seventeen-year effort to promote female literacy and education, with an emphasis on the expansion of his efforts into Afghanistan and his expressed desire to help the U.S. military to promote peace and build relationships with the Afghan shura (leaders).
