= Yvette Greer-Albrecht =

American athlete

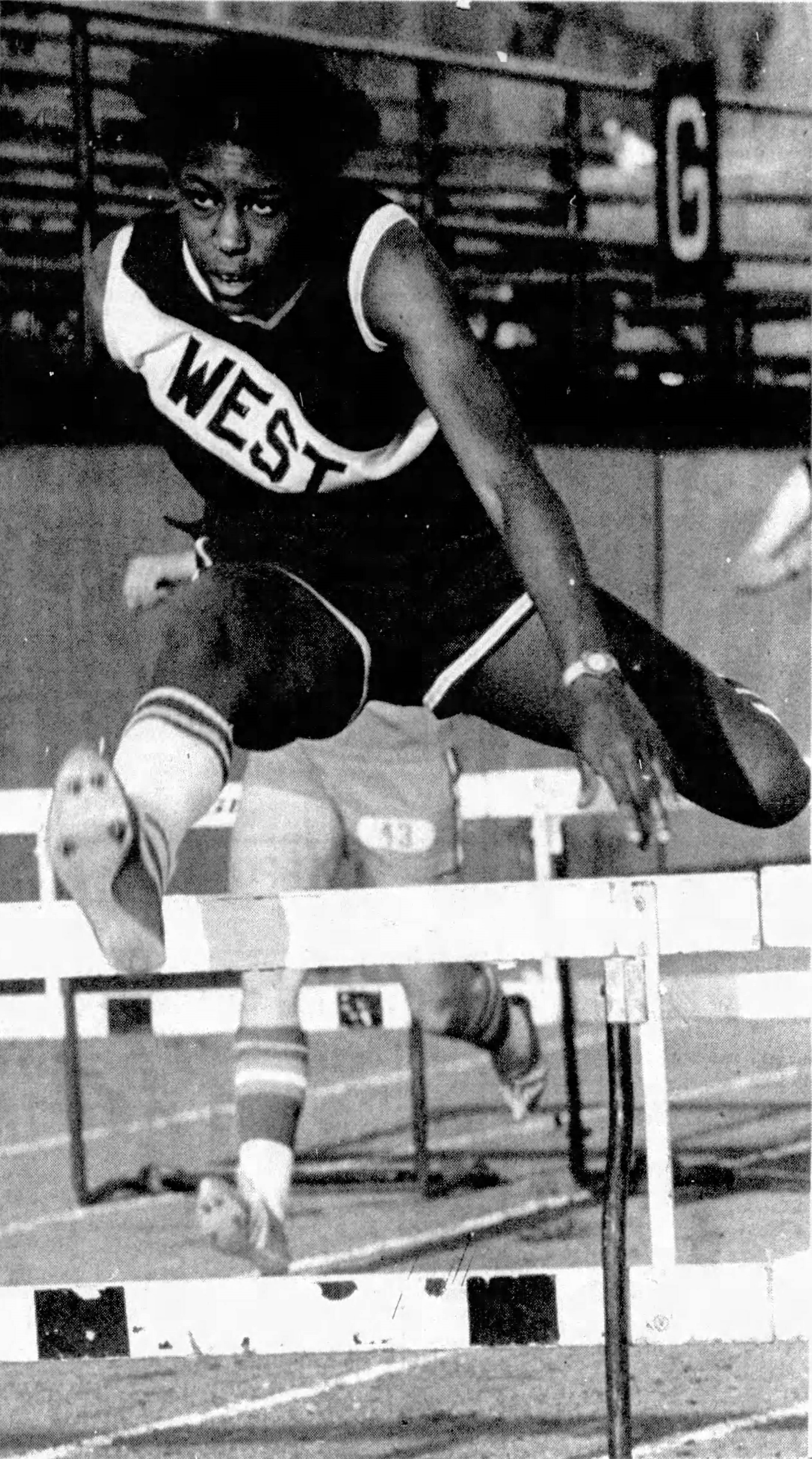
Greer-Albrecht hurdling in 1978

Yvette Greer-Albrecht is an American track and field athlete, hurdler, and track team coach. In 1979, she was named as the Female College Athlete of the Year by the South Dakota Sportswriters Association. In 1982, Greer-Albrecht became the first female track all-American at the University of South Dakota. She has been inducted into two halls of fame.

== Personal life ==
Greer-Albrecht was born in Sioux City, Iowa, to Wardell and Ruth Greer. She lives in Redfield, South Dakota, and has two children.

== Sports career ==
While attending West High School in Sioux City, Greer-Albrecht participated in the girls' state track meet during her senior year in 1978, when she won the 100 and 200 hurdles events. In 2005, it was reported by the Sioux City Journal that her records in both hurdles have never been beat, and the 200 hurdles was discontinued. The same article reported that she also held records for sprint medley and 4x400 relay teams. At the end of her time at West High School, Greer-Albrecht held 10 of 19 West High School records. She later attended the University of South Dakota. In 1979, she was named as the Female College Athlete of the Year by the South Dakota Sportswriters Association. In 1982, Greer-Albrecht became the first female track all-American at the University of South Dakota. In college, Greer-Albrecht specialized in sprints, hurdles, and long jumps. She was a seven-time North Central Conference champion.

Greer-Albrecht qualified for the NCAA Division II three times, and she held 21 of the college's indoor and outdoor school records. She won two North Central Conference outdoor championships in the 100-meter titles in 1979 and 1981, as well as winning three North Central Conference outdoor titles in the 100-meter titles in 1979, 1981, and 1982. During the 1982 North Central Conference indoor championships, Greer-Albrecht won in the indoor 55-meter hurdles, along with being part of the team that won the 800-meter relay. She was inducted into the South Dakota Coyote Sports Hall of Fame in 1995 after winning four 100 hurdles titles as part of the Dan Lennon Invitational. Greer-Albrecht was honored at the DakotaDome in Vermillion, South Dakota, in 2002, along with a special contributor.

Greer-Albrecht coached a high school girls track team in Redfield, and they entered the South Dakota championships in 2001 and 2003. In 2005, Greer-Albrecht and three other people were inducted into the Greater Siouxland Association Hall of Fame.
