= Vermillion Literary Project Magazine =

- Editor: Marcella Remund
- Categories: Literary magazine
- Frequency: Annual
- Publisher: University of South Dakota Press
- First issue: 1982; 43 years ago
- Country: United States
- Language: English
- Website: sites.usd.edu/projlit/home
- OCLC: 12664889

The Vermillion Literary Project Magazine is an American literary magazine distributed by the University of South Dakota. The student-produced journal has been in publication since 1982 and is the culmination of the Vermillion Literary Project.

The annual journal publishes art, essays and short stories that center on a regional theme, but make exceptions for distinguished work from world-wide submissions. The journal receives thousands of submissions annually and has an acceptance rate of 1%, with a large number of acceptances coming from work produced about experiences in South Dakota.

The literary magazine uses a blind review process and is affiliated with the National Writing Project.

The Vermillion Literary Project Magazine publishes works centered on a specific theme that changes each year, and the journal is edited entirely by USD students, while faculty advises the process.

== Bibliography ==
- Gannon, Michelle Rogge (May–June 2001). "Traveling with the E-Anthology: Arkansas Poem Finds Its Way to South Dakota Literary Magazine". The Voice. Vol. 6, no. 3. National Writing Project.
