= Pennies for Pakistan =

Pennies for Pakistan is a term several different organizations have used at different times for programs to raise humanitarian or educational aid for Pakistan.

== Organisations ==
These organizations include:

- Washington Homemakers Council, Washington State,1956
- In 1995, students and educators at Westside Elementary School in River Falls, Wisconsin, ran a Pennies for Pakistan campaign to buy materials for a school in Korphe, Pakistan; they collected about 62,000 pennies, and the school later received WEAC's 1997 Richard Lewandowski Memorial Award for Humanitarian Activities.
- Green Acres School, Hamilton Ontario, Canada, 2005
- Glenshaw Valley Presbyterian Church, Pittsburgh PA, 2006
- Central High School, Macon, GA 2008
- Quay Primary School, Bridlington, UK, 2010

== See also ==
Pennies for Peace
