= Central Asia Institute =

US-based non-profit organization

- Abbreviation: CAI
- Formation: June 1996; 29 years ago
- Founders: Greg Mortenson; Jean Hoerni
- Type: 501(c)(3)
- Legal status: Non-profit
- Purpose: Promotes literacy and education
- Headquarters: Bozeman, Montana
- Region served: Central Asia and South Asia
- Affiliations: Pennies for Peace
- Website: centralasiainstitute.org

Central Asia Institute (CAI) is an international non-profit organization co-founded by Greg Mortenson and Jean Hoerni in 1996. The organization is based in Bozeman, Montana, and works to promote and support community-based education in Pakistan, Afghanistan, and Tajikistan by building schools, supporting teacher-training programs, funding school scholarships, and supporting women's vocational training.

CAI's mission is to "to advance education and livelihood skills, especially for girls and women, in remote and mountainous regions of Afghanistan, Pakistan, and Tajikistan." The organization collaborates with communities to build schools in Pakistan, Afghanistan, and Tajikistan, with a particular emphasis on areas where there is little or no access to education. Pennies for Peace is an affiliated organization that partners with schools and clubs in the United States and around the world to raise pennies for CAI's educational efforts.

After a 60 Minutes segment aired questions about the organization's effectiveness, the Central Asia Institute has become a reference example for the limitations in evaluating charities based solely on financial ratios.

== History ==
CAI was registered as a 501(c)(3) non-profit organization in 1996. Greg Mortenson, co-founder of CAI, began his work in Pakistan in 1993. The organization was established with funds from co-founder Jean Hoerni, a Swiss physicist and Silicon Valley microchip pioneer. Mortenson's first visit to Pakistan was during his expedition to climb K2, the world's second-highest mountain. It was on this expedition that Mortenson met the Balti people, who inspired his humanitarian efforts.

For three years, from 1993-1996, Mortenson spent long periods of time in the Karakoram Mountain villages of Pakistan. His first project was a bridge over the Braldu River, which enabled the community and him to transport building materials to Korphe village, where he built his first school. Hoerni provided funding for these first two projects and subsequently established Central Asia Institute as a non-profit organization in the United States in 1996. Mortenson was appointed as its director. Hoerni died a year later from leukemia. CAI's first Board of Directors decided to focus the organization's efforts in the Karakoram Mountains of Pakistan in order to establish relationships to further community-based projects in the area.

By the late 1990s, CAI had begun to expand into other remote areas of Pakistan and Afghanistan. By 2008, CAI had set up 55 schools in Pakistan and nine schools in Afghanistan. Of those 63 schools, 43 were schools for girls. In 2011, the organization began working in the Gorno Badakhshan Autonomous Oblast, in eastern Tajikistan. CAI also completed various projects in Mongolia and Kyrgyzstan in the 1990s.

The organization's efforts are detailed on the CAI website, and the story of how CAI was founded is outlined in the 2006 New York Times best-selling book Three Cups of Tea by Mortenson and David Oliver Relin.

== Programs ==
CAI has several types of programs that help the organization carry out its mission to promote peace through education. Since 1996, CAI's programs have supported more than 300 community-initiated educational projects. The organization's programs and projects include the following:

School building, maintenance, equipment, and supplies: Projects in this category are related to the direct costs of building new schools, updating and/or maintaining existing schools, and providing necessary materials for the schools. This often includes ongoing support for uniforms, school equipment, and individual school supplies for students. Each of these projects includes local people.

Scholarships: CAI provides scholarships for advanced education.

Teacher support: CAI funds teacher training in some areas. CAI pays teachers' salaries when support is not provided by the government.

Public health: CAI provides funds for maternal healthcare, nutrition and hygiene awareness, disaster relief projects, and the installation of clean water systems. These efforts have included education for the victims of the 2005 Kashmir earthquake. The quake killed 74,000 people, including 18,000 students, and displaced 2.8 million people. CAI has rebuilt or re-established 16 schools destroyed in the earthquake.

Women's literacy & vocational centers: CAI supports literacy centers, where women of all ages get free lessons in reading, writing, and math, bringing them to about a 4th grade level of education. These centers also teach hygiene, sanitation, nutrition, and money management. CAI also supports vocational centers that train women in sewing, weaving, knitting, and provide equipment and materials.

Community support: CAI will occasionally fund small community projects when the community requests them. These projects include building bridges, establishing museums, providing porter training, among other projects.

Global outreach: CAI promotes the importance of education and literacy via the organization's website as well as other social media venues. The organization also publishes an annual magazine, "Journey of Hope," about its programs and projects. CAI created the Pennies for Peace curriculum to teach students about the importance of service learning.

== Controversy ==
On April 17, 2011, CBS' 60 Minutes aired an investigative story on CAI and Mortenson. The story alleged that CAI spent more money on 'domestic outreach' (book tours, speaking, travel) than on supporting schools overseas, and that Mortenson's accomplishments may have been exaggerated. CBS's story included an interview with Daniel Borochoff, president of the American Institute of Philanthropy, who alleged that CAI spent $1.7 million one year on "book related expenses" for books such as Three Cups of Tea. He further stated that CAI did not receive any proceeds from the sales of the book, but did receive a small income from Mortenson's speaking engagements. The 60 Minutes report featured best-selling author Jon Krakauer, who described what he called suspicious financial machinations within CAI. In 2002, the treasurer of the CAI had quit along with other board members.

On April 19, 2011, the Attorney General of Montana announced an inquiry into CAI's finances. After a year-long investigation, Mortenson agreed to repay $1 million to the CAI. The Montana inquiry found no criminality, stating “the Attorney General’s office did not find evidence of criminal activity that would warrant a criminal prosecution. Instead, the focus of the investigation was on governance and compliance under the Montana Nonprofit Corporation Act,” but required changes in CAI's governance, management, and financial controls going forward. Under the terms of the settlement agreement, Mortensen was required to resign as executive director and could no longer serve as a voting member of CAI's board. The Attorney General said the settlement would allow CAI to continue with what he described as a “worthwhile and important” mission.

In March 2013, Central Asia Institute hired David Starnes, as Executive Director, based on his years experience working with USAID in Iraq, Pakistan, Afghanistan and as an Executive Director with Outward Bound. But after 14 months, Starnes abruptly left Central Asia Institute after disagreements with the CAI board as to Mortenson's future role in the organization.

In August 2013 Krakauer wrote a follow-up article for The Daily Beast in which he stated that an audit of CAI's overseas projects indicated that the charity was still "beset by widespread corruption" and that Mortenson remaining as the public face of the charity was not "in the best interest of the charity or the people it serves". He concluded that "anyone thinking about donating to CAI should probably reconsider".

In 2014, Charity Navigator gave Central Asia Institute a four-star rating with high scores on both capacity and efficiency, but added a "Donor Advisory" with details of the claims made in the CBS report, and links to claims by critics and Mortenson's responses. The Better Business Bureau reviewed the organization's standing and updated its rating to include CAI as an accredited charity. GuideStar updated CAI's rating to three stars and the "Gold Participant" designation for its commitment to transparency.

In January 2014, Mortenson was interviewed on Today by Tom Brokaw. He apologized and acknowledged that he had let a lot of people down, and said "I failed in many ways, and it's an important lesson."

In May 2015, the Montana Attorney General stated that Central Asia Institute and Greg Mortenson had completed the terms of a three-year compliance monitoring period, and CAI stated that the IRS had completed its examination of the nonprofit. The organization reported that it was having a return in donors and rise in contributions.

Mortensen retired from CAI in November 2015. By 2018, CAI reported nearly $3 million in annual revenue, with thousands of donors contributing, underscoring a degree of financial recovery and ongoing public support.

As of 2025, CAI is listed as a Top-Rated Charity by Charity WatchDog. It maintains a “Platinum” transparency rating on GuideStar and four stars on Charity Navigator. Board members include the late Ambassador Richard Boucher, retired Ambassador Asif Chaudry, and retired Ambassador Christina Rocca. Media attention on CAI has subsided since the peak of its controversy, but case studies still cite the organization as both a cautionary tale and an example of nonprofit recovery through governance reforms, financial transparency, and recommitment to mission-driven work.

== Recognition ==
As a result of his work with CAI, co-founder Greg Mortenson received the Sitara-e-Pakistan (Star of Pakistan), Pakistan's third-highest civilian award in 2009.

== See also ==
- Pennies for Peace
