= Korphe =

Coordinates: 35°40′30″N 75°48′42″E

Korphe ཀོརྰེ་
- Interactive map of Korphe ཀོརྰེ་
- Country: Pakistan
- Province: Baltistan

Population (2006)
  - Total: 400 (estimate)
- Time zone: UTC+5 (PST)

Korphe (Balti: ཀོརྰེ་, Urdu: کورپھے) is a small subsistence farming village in northeastern Pakistan, situated at the foot of the Karakoram mountain range along the banks of the Braldu River.

Korphe has achieved international attention because of the work carried out by mountaineer Greg Mortenson and his Central Asia Institute (CAI) which specializes in raising money from all over the world in order to provide good quality schooling for the children of Korphe and similar villages throughout the region, including Afghanistan. How this came to pass has been extensively documented in the book Three Cups of Tea written by Mortenson and journalist David Oliver Relin and the Young Readers edition of Three Cups of Tea adapted by Sarah Thomson.
