= Sheila Gestring =

18th president of the University of South Dakota
- Incumbent
- Assumed office June 22, 2018
- Preceded by: Jim Abbott

Academic background
- Education: University of Sioux Falls (BA); University of South Dakota (MBA)

Academic work
- Discipline: Business Administration
- Institutions: University of South Dakota

Sheila K. Gestring is an American academic administrator serving as the 18th president of the University of South Dakota (USD) since 2018. She was previously its chief financial officer from 2010 to 2018. Gestring is the second female president of the university.

== Biography ==
Sheila Gestring was born in South Dakota. She has a bachelor’s degree in accounting and business administration from the University of Sioux Falls and an M.B.A. from the University of South Dakota. She worked in state government offices and was the chief financial officer at Flathead Valley Community College in Montana for three years.

Gestring began working as a financial director at USD in 2006. She became assistant vice president of finance and administration in 2008, and subsequently the chief financial officer and vice president of finance in 2010. In 2017, she served as president of the Vermillion Chamber and Development Corporation.

In 2018, the South Dakota Board of Regents voted unanimously in favor of appointing Gestring as USD's 18th president. She succeed the outgoing president, Jim Abbott. Gestring assumed office on June 22, 2018.

She welcomed Timothy O'Keefe as the university's dean of the Beacom School of Business in June 2023. In December 2023, she announced Jon Schemmel as the school's athletics director.

== Personal life ==
Gestring's husband Keith works for South Dakota Department of Environment and Natural Resources. They have two children.
