= Cankdeska Cikana Community College =

Tribal land-grant college in North Dakota, U.S.

Coordinates: 47°58′42″N 98°59′26″W

- Type: Public tribal land-grant community college
- Established: 1970; 56 years ago
- Academic affiliations: Space-grant
- President: Cynthia Lindquist Mala
- Students: 251
- Location: Fort Totten, North Dakota, United States
- Campus: Spirit Lake Reservation
- Website: www.littlehoop.edu

Cankdeska Cikana Community College is a public tribal land-grant community college in Fort Totten, North Dakota, on the Spirit Lake Reservation. The college is accredited by the Higher Learning Commission. The college is named after Paul "Little Hoop" Yankton, a Dakota man who fought and died in World War II; his Dakota name was Cankdeska Cikana.

== History ==
CCCC's origins can be traced back to a Lake Region State College program offering a class in Fort Totten in 1965. The program slowly expanded under tribal governance, and the tribe established Cankdeska Cikana Community College in the 1970s. CCCC was established to provide higher education opportunities for the people of the Spirit Lake Reservation, including classes to preserve Dakota culture and language.

CCCC was chartered by the Spirit Lake Dakota Nation in 1974. Its first graduating class consisted of 5 students in 1977. CCCC's graduating class of 2009 was 42 students. In 1994, the college was designated a land-grant college alongside 31 other tribal colleges.

As of 2011, it is one of seven tribal colleges in the U.S. to offer a degree related to tribal administration.

== Athletics ==
Undergraduate demographics as of Fall 2023
Race and ethnicity	Total
American Indian/Alaska Native	87%
White	9%
Hispanic	2%
Two or more races	2%
Economic diversity
Low-income (Note: The percentage of students who received an income-based federal Pell grant intended for low-income students.)	69%
Affluent (Note: The percentage of students who are a part of the American middle class at the bare minimum.)	31%

The school plays basketball in the Northern Intercollegiate Athletic Conference.
