= University of South Dakota =

Public university in Vermillion, South Dakota, US

- Former name: University of Dakota (1862–1891)
- Motto: Veritas (Latin)
- Motto in English: "Truth"
- Type: Public research university
- Established: 1862; 164 years ago
- Parent institution: South Dakota Board of Regents
- Accreditation: HLC
- Academic affiliations: Space-grant
- Endowment: $338.6 million (2025)
- President: Sheila Gestring
- Faculty: 453
- Students: 10,405
- Undergraduates: 7,515
- Postgraduates: 2,352
- Location: Vermillion, South Dakota, United States; 42°47′10″N 96°55′31″W
- Campus: 274 acres (1.11 km^{2}); Town
- Other campuses: Pierre; Rapid City; Sioux Falls; Yankton
- Newspaper: The Volante
- Colors: Coyote Red and white
- Nickname: Coyotes
- Sporting affiliations: NCAA Division I FCS – Summit League; MVFC
- Mascot: Charlie Coyote
- Website: www.usd.edu

The University of South Dakota (USD) is a public research university in Vermillion, South Dakota, United States. Established by the Dakota Territory legislature in 1862, 27 years before the establishment of the state of South Dakota, USD is the flagship university of South Dakota and the state's oldest public university. It occupies a 274 acres (1.11 km^{2}) campus located in southeastern South Dakota, approximately 63 miles (101 km) south of Sioux Falls, 39 miles (63 km) northwest of Sioux City, Iowa, and north of the Missouri River.

The university is home to South Dakota's only medical school and law school. It is also home to the National Music Museum, with over 15,000 American, European, and non-Western instruments. USD is governed by the South Dakota Board of Regents, and its president is Sheila Gestring. The university has been accredited by the North Central Association of College and Schools since 1913. It is classified among "R2: Doctoral Universities – High research activity".

University of South Dakota's alumni include a total of 17 Truman Scholars, 12 Rhodes Scholars, and 1 Nobel Laureate (Ernest Lawrence '1922, 1939 Nobel Prize in Physics). The athletic teams compete in the NCAA's Division I as members of The Summit League, except football, which competes in the Missouri Valley Football Conference.

== History ==
The University of South Dakota was founded in 1862 by the Dakota Territorial Legislature which authorized the establishment of the University at Vermillion. The authorization was unfunded, however, and classes did not begin until 20 years later under the auspices of the privately incorporated University of Dakota, created with support from the citizens of Clay County. Ephraim Epstein served as the first president and primary faculty member in the institution that opened in loaned space in downtown Vermillion. Before 1883 ended, the university had moved into Old Main, and the first public board was appointed to govern the institution.

Enrollment increased to 69 students by the end of 1883, and, by the time South Dakota became the 40th state in 1889, the university boasted an enrollment of 500 students. The school's name was updated in 1891 to reflect the division of the Dakota Territory, becoming the University of South Dakota. USD's first academic unit, the College of Arts and Sciences, was established in 1883. The School of Law began offering classes in 1901; the School of Medicine in 1907; Continuing Education in 1916; the Graduate School in 1927; and the College of Fine Arts in 1931. The School of Business began offering classes in 1927 and has been continuously accredited by the Association to Advance Collegiate Schools of Business (AACSB) since 1949.

It is the state's oldest public university and is one of six universities governed by the South Dakota Board of Regents. USD has been accredited by the Higher Learning Commission of the North Central Association of Colleges and Schools since 1913 and is a member of the Association of Public and Land-Grant Universities. The school houses the state's only law and medical schools and the lone College of Fine Arts.

== Campus ==
The University of South Dakota is based on a 216-acre (87 ha) campus along the bluffs near the Missouri River in the southeast corner of the state. The most prominent academic facility on campus, one of the school's symbols, is Old Main. It was built in 1883, burned down in 1893, and was fully restored in 1997. Along with several classrooms, it houses the Oscar Howe Gallery and the University Honors Program. Farber Hall, a 190-seat theater used mainly for speaking engagements, is also in Old Main.

=== Campus and academic buildings ===
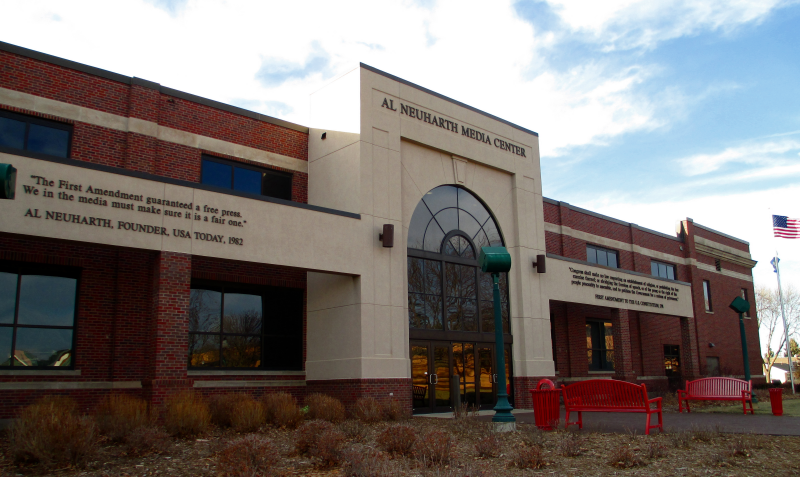
Al Neuharth Media Center, dedicated to Al Neuharth

USD opened the Theodore R. and Karen K. Muenster University Center (MUC) for student use on February 17, 2009. The MUC houses the Student Activities Center, a campus dining facility, coffee shop, bookstore, convenience store and a number of lounge and TV areas. It was expanded on January 13, 2014, to include more food and entertainment options.

One of the newest additions to the campus is the Al Neuharth Media Center, named for the founder of USA Today. Dedicated in September 2003, the Neuharth Center houses the news and media organizations on campus, including the Freedom Forum’s South Dakota operations, South Dakota Public Broadcasting, the Department of Contemporary Media and Journalism, the campus newspaper The Volante, campus radio station KAOR, and television station KYOT. Formerly an armory and athletic field house, the building was converted into a media center through donations made by Al Neuharth, a 1950 USD graduate.

In 2024, USD renovated and reopened the South Dakota Union building. Built in 1930, the South Dakota Union is home to USD’s Department of Psychology, Psychological Services Center, the Disaster Mental Health Institute, the Heimstra Human Factors Labs and the Advanced Visualization Laboratory. The historic building has been fully modernized to support USD’s Department of Psychology and its research labs. The renovation includes updated offices and classrooms, a private-entry clinic, enhanced neuroscience and behavioral research facilities, and improved building-wide accessibility and security.

The National Music Museum, founded in 1972 on the University of South Dakota campus, is known for its renowned collections that feature fine and historic instruments from many cultures and historical periods. Following a multi-year renovation and reinstallation project that began in 2019 and was completed in 2023. The National Music Museum's holdings range from priceless Italian violins to celebrity guitars, and is recognized as "A Landmark of American Music" by the National Music Council.

==== Galleries ====
The University of South Dakota has two main galleries: The John A. Day Gallery located in the Fine Arts building and the Oscar Howe Gallery located in Old Main. There are several other locations across campus that are designated gallery space, such as the hallway on the second floor of the Muenster University Center.

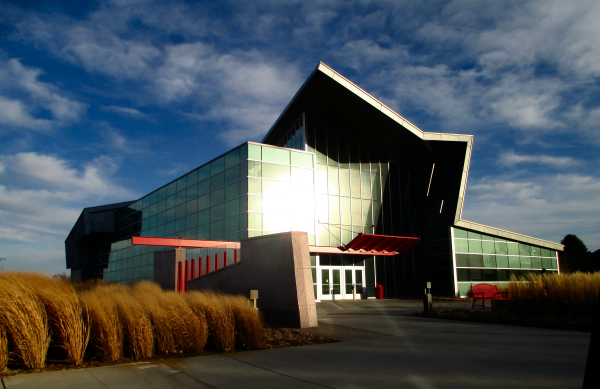
Student Wellness Center

=== Wellness Center, Dakota Dome & Sanford Coyote Sports Center ===
A $15 million, 61,000-square-foot (5,700 m^{2}) wellness center opened in the spring of 2011. Located just north of the Warren M. Lee Center for the Fine Arts, the center includes state-of-the-art workout equipment, a multi-story climbing wall, multiple courts for basketball and volleyball, racquetball courts, and a three-lane walking/jogging track. The Natatorium expansion opened in the spring of 2025 and is located on the south side of the original wellness center. The new pool addition added 45,800 feet of space to the facility and holds seating for 400 spectators for home USD swim meets.

The DakotaDome serves not only as the home venue for the school's football, softball, swimming, basketball, volleyball, and track and field teams, but also as a recreational center for the student body. It is South Dakota's only domed football stadium, hosting the state's high school football championships in November.

The Sanford Coyote Sports Center opened ahead of the 2016-17 athletic season. The facility hosts the men's and women's basketball teams in addition to the volleyball team. The facility is named after Sanford Health, a major supporter of USD Athletics.

The arena houses a main competition court surrounded by 6,000 spectator seats which includes an integrated club space. There are also two full-size practice courts, locker rooms, offices, a film room and meeting rooms. The facility contains a state-of-the-art sports medicine training room and a 7,500 square-foot weight room. The training room includes hydro therapy, a biomechanics lab and a physical therapy and rehabilitation center.

=== USD – Sioux Falls Campus ===
The university operates a non-residential satellite campus, USD – Sioux Falls, located at 4801 N. Career Avenue in Sioux Falls, the state's largest city. The three-building campus is home to nearly twenty academic programs with a focus on healthcare, business, and education, including four graduate programs. The campus is adjacent to the USD Discovery District, a corporate and academic research park. The USD – Sioux Falls campus formally became part of USD in 2022.

== Academics ==
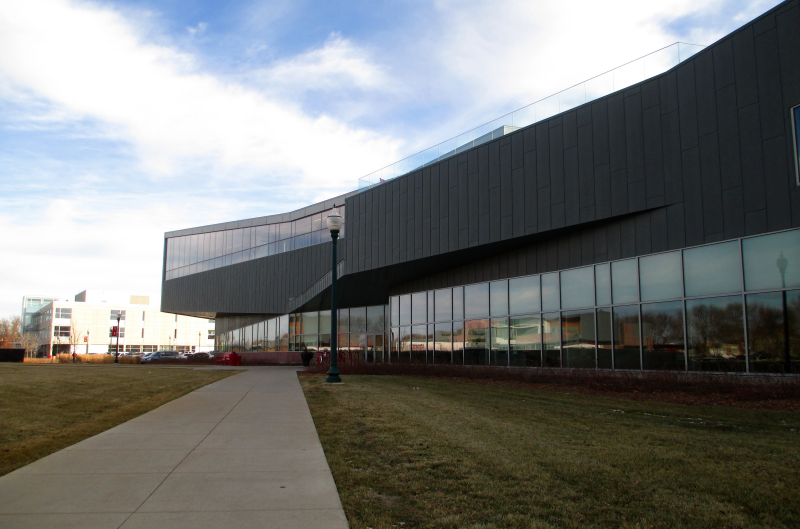
Beacom School of Business

Academic rankings

National
- Forbes: 493
- U.S. News & World Report: 273
- Washington Monthly: 284
- WSJ/College Pulse: > 600

Global
- THE: 601–800
- U.S. News & World Report: 1680

The University of South Dakota has the state's only law and medical schools. As of 2019, the university has seven colleges and universities offering 205 undergraduate and 75 graduate programs, including:

- College of Arts and Sciences
- Beacom School of Business
- School of Education
- College of Fine Arts
- School of Health Sciences
- School of Law
- School of Medicine

== Student life ==
Undergraduate demographics as of Fall 2023
Race and ethnicity	Total
White	80%
Hispanic	6%
Black	4%
International student	4%
Two or more races	3%
American Indian/Alaska Native	2%
Asian	1%
Unknown	1%
Economic diversity
Low-income (Note: The percentage of students who received an income-based federal Pell grant intended for low-income students.)	25%
Affluent (Note: The percentage of students who are a part of the American middle class at the bare minimum.)	75%

The University of South Dakota has over 200 student organizations.

=== Greek life ===
There are several fraternities and sororities on campus.

=== Homecoming – Dakota Days ===
The homecoming tradition of Dakota Days started in 1914 under President Robert L. Slagle. In 2014, USD celebrated its 100th Dakota Days.

== Media ==
=== Coyote News ===
In fall 2005, USD's Media & Journalism Department revived its weekly live 30-minute television newscast, Coyote News. It is entirely produced, directed & reported by USD students.

=== Coyote Radio ===
In 2011 KAOR FM was renamed Coyote Radio, following the University of South Dakota's decision to end the U. Campaign. The central on-campus headquarters for KAOR Radio is the Al Neuharth Media Center while the transmitter lies atop Slagle Hall on USD's campus.

=== The Volante ===
The Volante (Spanish for "steering wheel") has served as the campus newspaper since 1887. Managed entirely by a staff of about 20 students in 2025, The Volante prides itself on its editorial independence. The paper has won numerous awards, including a number of Best of Show and Pacemakers. In October 2011 it was awarded its 8th Pacemaker Award, sometimes called the Pulitzer Prize of college journalism, by the Associated Collegiate Press.

=== Department media ===
The Vermillion Literary Project Magazine is a literary journal published by the English Department of the University of South Dakota. It is staffed by undergraduate and graduate students.

=== South Dakota Public Broadcasting ===
The university is home to South Dakota Public Broadcasting. It is a network of Public Broadcasting Service (PBS) television and NPR radio stations serving the state of South Dakota.

== Athletics ==
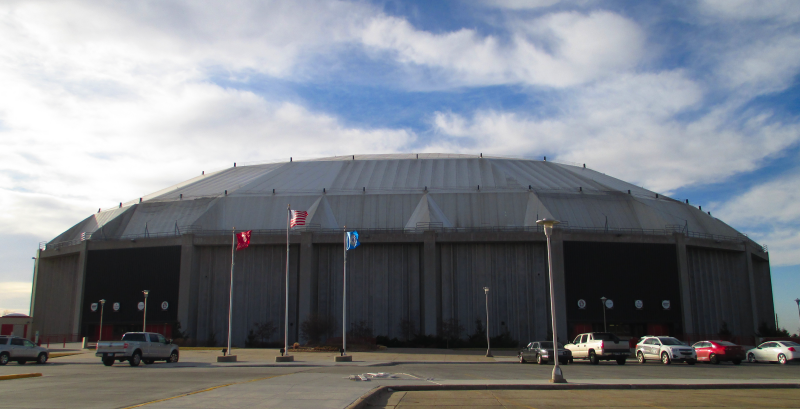
DakotaDome, home of USD football and other athletics

The University of South Dakota sponsors six sports for men (football, basketball, swimming & diving, cross country, track & field and golf) and nine sports for women (basketball, swimming & diving, cross country, track & field, golf, soccer, softball, tennis and volleyball). The school's athletic teams are called the "Coyotes" (pronounced Ki Yoat) and nicknamed the "Yotes" (Yoats). The school colors are red and white. USD competes at the NCAA Division I level (Football Championship Subdivision in football) and is a member of The Summit League for all sports except football. Its football team is a member of the Missouri Valley Football Conference. Athletic facilities include the DakotaDome, for football and indoor track, the Sanford Coyote Sports Center for volleyball and men's and women's basketball, First Bank & Trust Soccer Complex and Lillibridge Track Complex.

The long-time intrastate rivalry between the Coyotes and South Dakota State Jackrabbits ended in 2003 when SDSU moved to Division I athletics and the Coyotes remained in Division II. USD eventually moved up to Division I and in the 2011–2012 academic year, SDSU and USD resumed regularly scheduled contests in most sports when the Coyotes joined the athletics conferences in which SDSU was a member, the Summit League and the Missouri Valley Football Conference.

The University of South Dakota fight songs include South Dakota Victory, Hail South Dakota and Get Along Coyotes.

The University of South Dakota's mascot of Coyotes comes from a horse race in 1863 in which a Dakota horse outran a horse from Iowa, in which someone from Iowa stated, "look at the Kiote run."

== Notable alumni and faculty ==
Among the thousands of graduates from the University of South Dakota, notable alumni in the field of journalism include Al Neuharth, founder of the USA Today B.A., 1946; Greg Mortenson, author of Three Cups of Tea and Stones into Schools B.A., 1983; Tom Brokaw, American broadcaster and longtime NBC Nightly News anchor B.A., 1964.

The University is notable for its numerous alumni in the field of politics and government including former U.S. Senators James Abourezk, Tim Johnson, Larry Pressler; and current U.S. Representative Dusty Johnson as well current U.S. Senator John Thune.

Notable University of South Dakota alumni and faculty include:

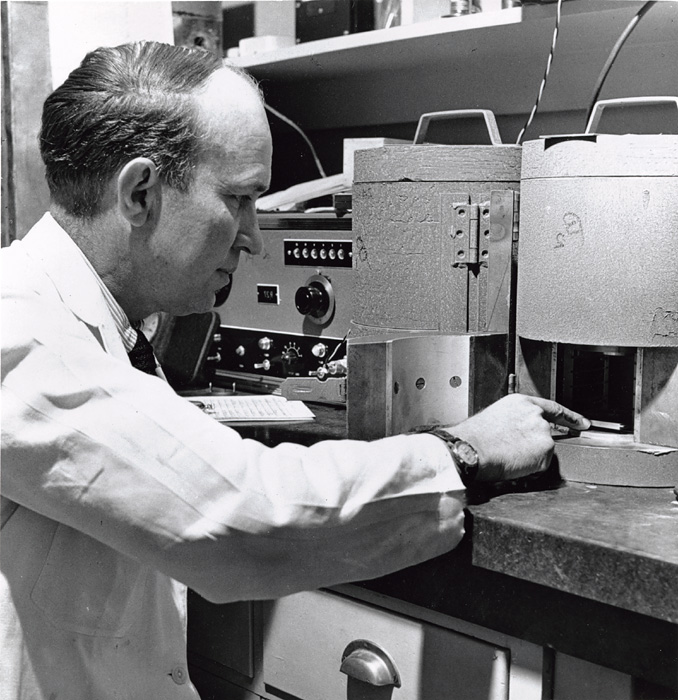
John H. Lawrence
American physicist and physician best known for pioneering the field of nuclear medicine.

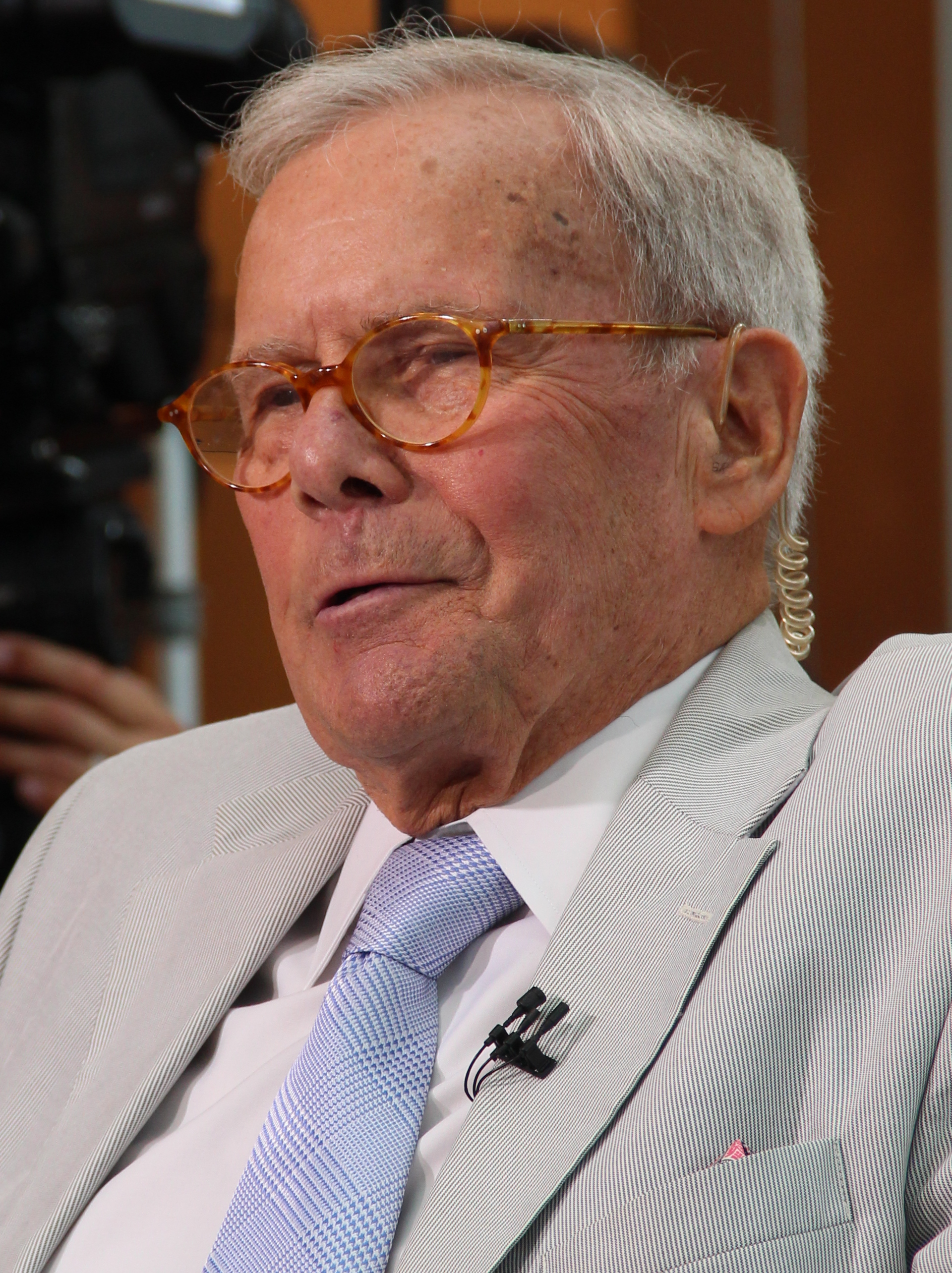
Tom Brokaw,
B.A. 1964
American broadcaster and longtime NBC Nightly News anchor

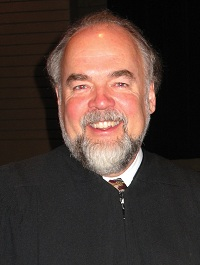
David Gilbertson,
J.D. 1975,
Former Chief Justice, South Dakota Supreme Court

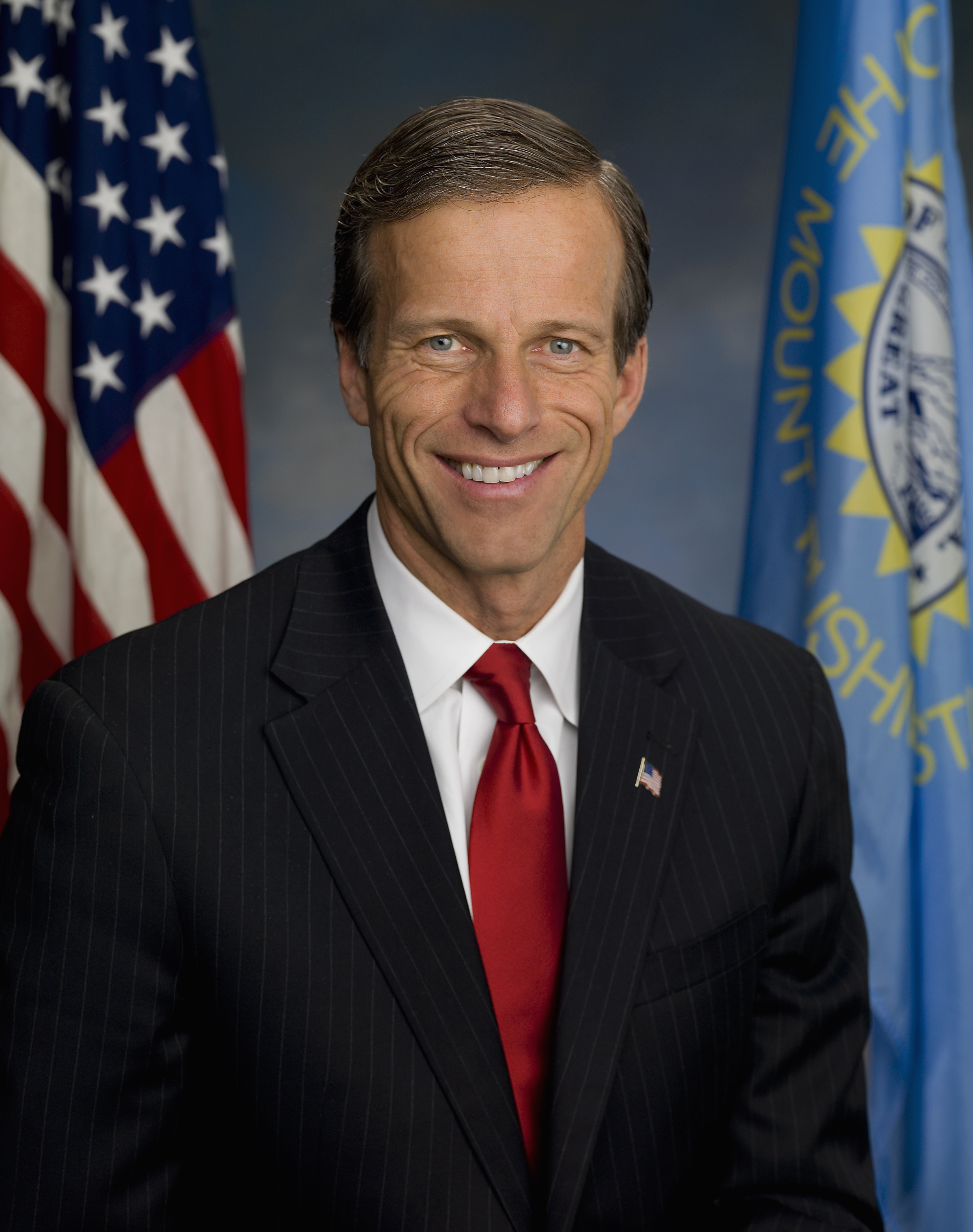
John Thune,
M.B.A. 1984
current Majority Leader of the U.S. Senate

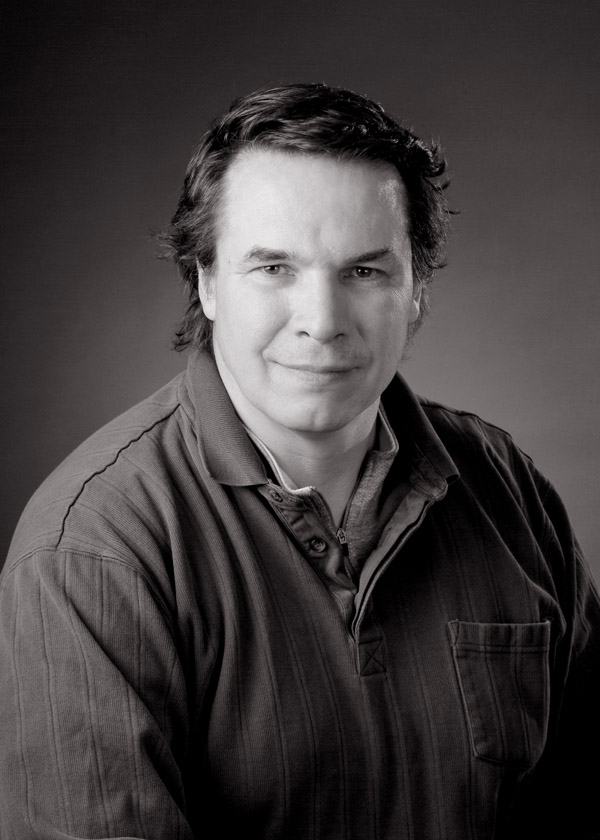
Greg Mortenson,
B.A. 1983
Author of Three Cups of Tea and Stones into Schools

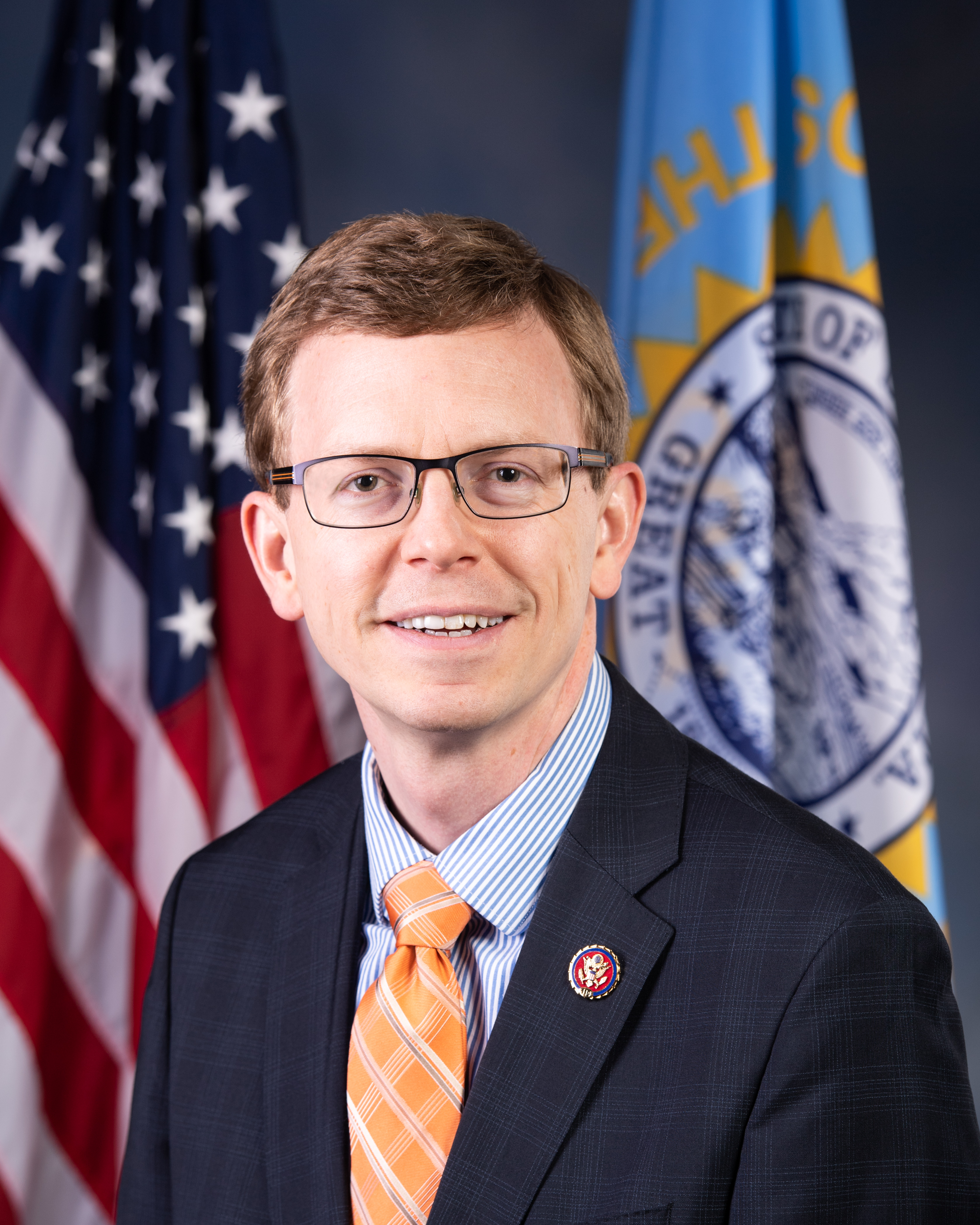
Dusty Johnson,
B.A. 1999
current U.S. Representative from South Dakota.

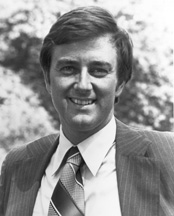
Larry Pressler, Senator and first Vietnam Veteran in Congress

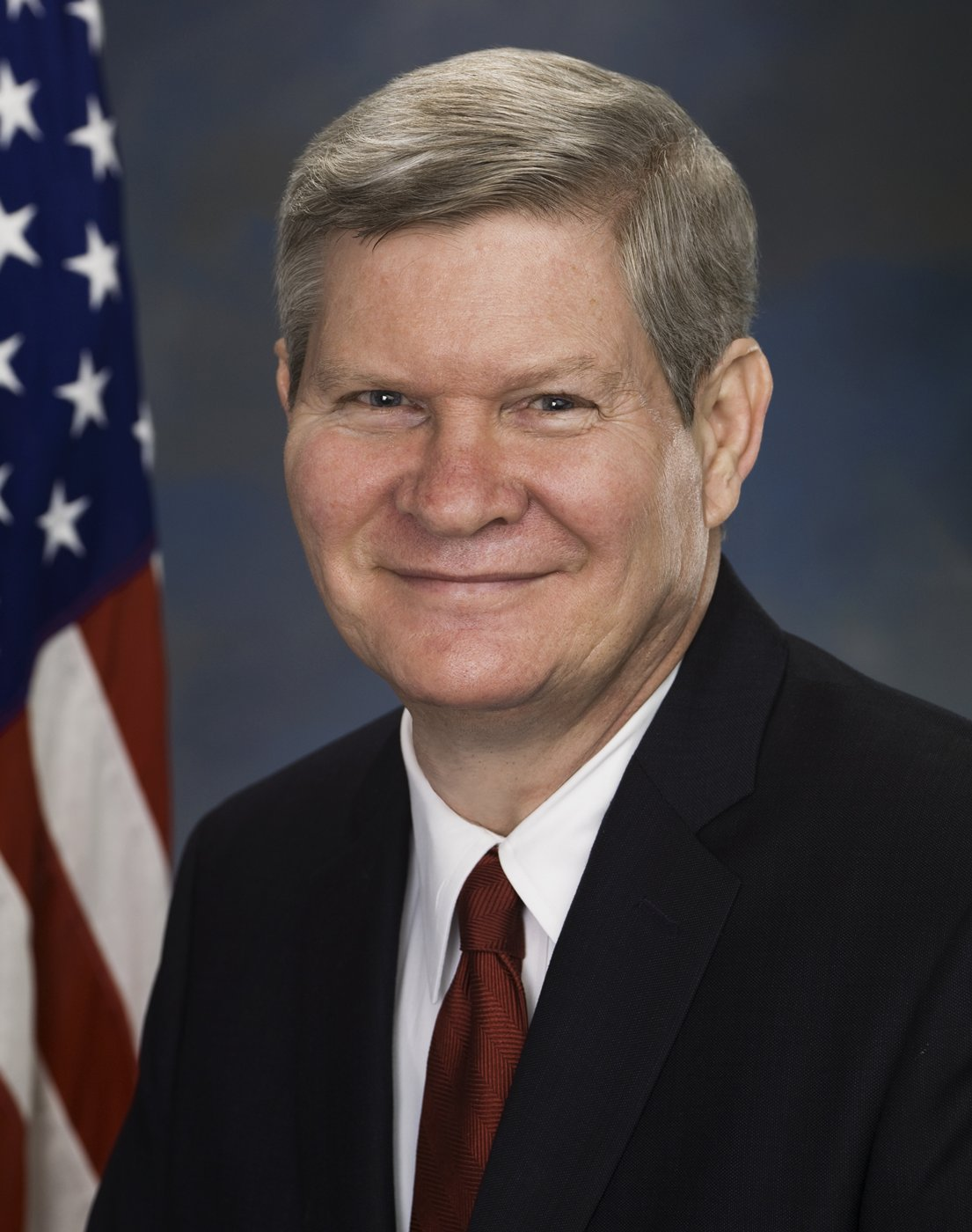
Senator Tim Johnson

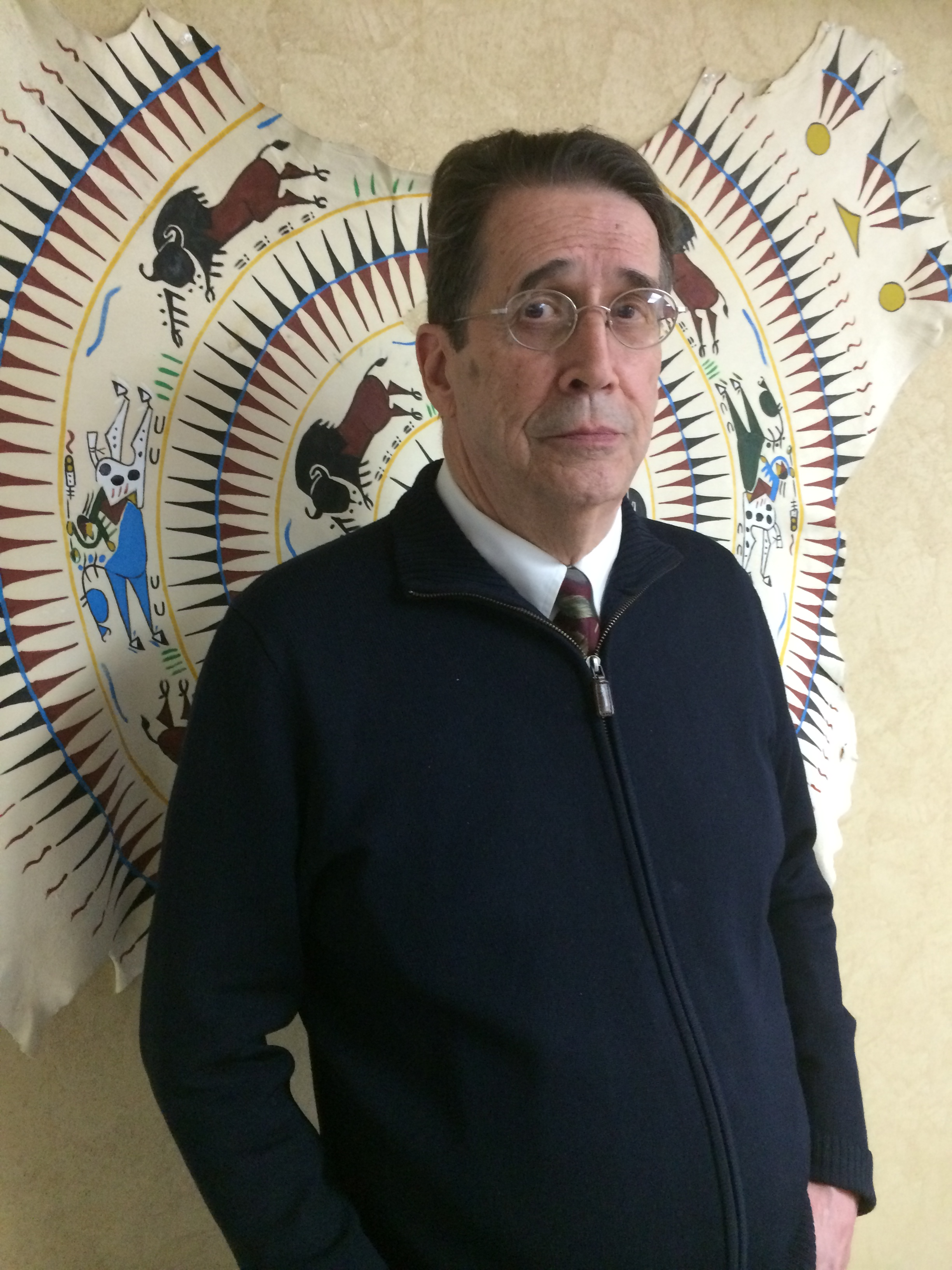
Frank Pommersheim, American-Indian law scholar

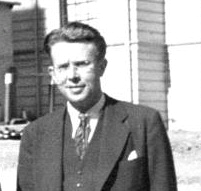
Ernest Lawrence, Nobel Laureate in Physics, 1922 graduate, Inventor of the cyclotron.
