= David Oliver Relin =

American writer

- Born: December 12, 1962; Rochester, New York, US
- Died: November 15, 2012 (aged 49); Multnomah County, Oregon, US
- Education: Vassar College '85
- Occupations: writer, magazine editor
- Known for: co-author of Three Cups of Tea
- Spouse: Dawn Relin
- Awards: Michener Fellowship; Kiriyama Prize

David Oliver Relin (December 12, 1962 – November 15, 2012) was an American journalist and the co-author of the New York Times best-selling book, Three Cups of Tea, published in 2006. Relin co-wrote the book with Greg Mortenson. The book gives Mortenson's account of his transition from registered nurse and mountain-climber to humanitarian committed to reducing poverty and promoting education for girls in Pakistan and Afghanistan.

In addition to Three Cups of Tea, Relin was a contributing editor for Parade and Skiing magazines. He won more than 40 national awards for his work as a writer and editor, including the Kiriyama Prize.

== Personal and professional life ==
Relin was born in Rochester, New York and graduated from Vassar College. After being awarded a Michener Fellowship to support a 1992 bicycle trip through Vietnam, he spent two years in Huế writing about the country opening itself up to the world economically and educationally. Relin traveled to and reported from numerous countries in East Asia.

A significant portion of Relin's writing focused on social issues and on children and along with being a contributing editor for Parade and Skiing magazines, Relin was a senior news editor for React, another newsmagazine publication of Parade. He also wrote investigative feature articles on school shootings, ecstasy abuse, and teenagers in prison for Teen People. His articles for Teen People enabled that publication to win the National Magazine Award for General Excellence.

Before his death, Relin had completed work on a new book, about two doctors working to cure cataract-related blindness in the developing world. Second Suns: Two Doctors and Their Amazing Quest to Restore Sight and Save Lives was published posthumously.

=== Death ===
According to his family, Relin had been diagnosed with depression. His obituary in The New York Times reported that he suffered emotionally and financially when basic facts in Three Cups of Tea were called into question. On November 15, 2012, at age 49, he died by suicide, stepping in front of a freight train outside Portland, Oregon.
