= Michele Reinhart =

American politician

Member of the Montana House of Representatives from the 97th district
- In office 2007–2013

Personal details
- Born: Livingston, Montana
- Party: Democratic Party
- Education: Carroll College, University of Montana
- Occupation: Land use planner

Michele Reinhart is an American politician and former member of the Montana House of Representatives who represented the 97th district from 2007 to 2013 as a member of the Democratic Party. Her political views as a representative included being Pro-choice, supporting tax credits for the use of biodiesel, and Country of origin labeling for food.

She was a community organizer and citizen lobbyist for the Northern Plains Resource Council, a Billings Montana environmental organization, from 2003 to 2005. She was the youngest woman serving in the Montana State Legislature upon her election.
