= Riley Creek (Middle Creek tributary) =

- Mouth of Riley Creek

Location
- Country: Canada
- Province: British Columbia
- District: Cassiar Land District

Physical characteristics
- Source: Level Mountain
  - location: Nahlin Plateau
  - coordinates: 58°10′21″N 131°0′24″W
  - elevation: 1,190 m (3,900 ft)
- Mouth: Middle Creek
  - coordinates: 58°5′47″N 131°4′19″W
  - elevation: 501 m (1,644 ft)
- Length: 10 km (6.2 mi)
- Basin size: 22.1 km^{2} (8.5 sq mi),
- Discharge
  - average: 0.192 m^{3}/s (6.8 cu ft/s)

Basin features
- Topo map: NTS 104J3 Tahltan River

Riley Creek is a tributary of Middle Creek, which in turn is a tributary of the Tahltan River, part of the Stikine River watershed in northwest part of the province of British Columbia, Canada. It flows generally south for roughly 10 km (6.2 mi) to join Middle Creek about 1.5 km (0.93 mi) north of Middle Creek's confluence with the Tahltan River. Riley Creek's watershed covers 22.1 km^{2} (8.5 sq mi), and its mean annual discharge is estimated at 0.192 m^{3}/s (6.8 cu ft/s). The mouth of Riley Creek is located about 22 km (14 mi) north of Telegraph Creek, British Columbia, about 74 km (46 mi) southwest of Dease Lake, British Columbia, and about 122 km (76 mi) east of Juneau, Alaska. Riley Creek's watershed's land cover is classified as 39.9% shrubland, 36.8% conifer forest, 20.3% mixed forest, and small amounts of other cover.

Riley Creek is in the traditional territory of the Tahltan First Nation, of the Tahltan people.

== Geography ==
Riley Creek originates on the southeast edge of the massive Level Mountain shield volcano, about 42 km (26 mi) southeast of Meszah Peak, the highest peak of the Level Mountain Range, a cluster of bare peaks on the summit of Level Mountain. From its source near Classy Creek, Mansfield Creek, and Hartz Creek, Riley creek flows generally south and through a forested gorge to Middle Creek, which in turn empties into the Tahltan River.

== See also ==
- List of rivers of British Columbia
