= Kakuchuya Creek =

Tributary river in the country of Canada

- Mouth of Kakuchuya Creek

Location
- Country: Canada
- Province: British Columbia
- District: Cassiar Land District

Physical characteristics
- Source: Level Mountain
  - location: Nahlin Plateau
  - coordinates: 58°24′45″N 131°25′17″W
  - elevation: 1,805 m (5,922 ft)
- Mouth: Dudidontu River
  - coordinates: 58°35′18″N 131°46′55″W
  - elevation: 933 m (3,061 ft)
- Length: 56 km (35 mi)
- Basin size: 362 km^{2} (140 sq mi)
- Discharge
  - average: 6.94 m^{3}/s (245 cu ft/s)

Basin features
- Tributaries
  - right: Matsatu Creek
- Topo map: NTS 104J12 Dudidontu River; NTS 104J5 Ketchum Lake; NTS 104J6 Beatty Creek

Kakuchuya Creek, historically called the Kakuchuya River, is a tributary of the Dudidontu River and part of the Taku River watershed in northwest part of the province of British Columbia, Canada.

From its source at Level Mountain, where the creek has cut a large gorge into its western escarpment, Kakuchuya Creek flows generally west then north for roughly 56 km (35 mi) to join the Dudidontu River, the main tributary of the Nahlin River, which in turn is a tributary of the Inklin River, which joins the Nakina River to form the Taku River.

Kakuchuya Creek's mean annual discharge is estimated at 6.94 m^{3}/s (245 cu ft/s). Its watershed covers 362 km^{2} (140 sq mi). The watershed's land cover is classified as 41.6% shrubland, 32.5% barren, 17.3% conifer forest, 3.8% herbaceous, and small amounts of other cover.

The mouth of Kakuchuya Creek is located about 85 km (53 mi) south of the community of Telegraph Creek, British Columbia, about 105 km (65 mi) west of Dease Lake, British Columbia, and about 155 km (96 mi) east of Juneau, Alaska.

Kakuchuya Creek's watershed is within the traditional territory of the Tahltan First Nation, of the Tahltan people, as well as the Tlingit Taku River Tlingit First Nation.

== Geography ==
Kakuchuya Creek originates in the Level Mountain Range, a cluster of bare peaks on the summit of the massive Level Mountain shield volcano, which forms the most voluminous and most persistent eruptive centre in the Northern Cordilleran Volcanic Province. The source of Kakuchuya Creek is about 7 km (4.3 mi) south of Meszah Peak, the highest peak of the Level Mountain Range, and is close to the sources of the Dudidontu River, the Little Tuya River, Beatty Creek, and Megatushon Creek.

From its source Kakuchuya Creek flows west through a large U-shaped valley glacial valley carved into Level Mountain's high and relatively barren lava plateau, then through the high the western escarpment of Level Mountain. As the creek continues flowing west through the Nahlin Plateau, it collects numerous unnamed tributary streams. About halfway along its total length, Kakuchuya Creek turns north. This portion of the creek's watershed is largely coniferous forests and contains a series of small lakes. After collecting several more unnamed tributaries, Kakuchuya Creek receives Matsatu Creek, which also flows from Level Mountain. From its confluence with Matsatu Creek, Kakuchuya Creek flows west for about 1 km (0.62 mi) to empty into the Dudidontu River, about 8 km (5.0 mi) southwest of Hatin Lake on the Koshin River, near the locality of Callison Ranch. The mouth of Kakuchuya Creek is about 10 km (6.2 mi) east of the summit of Heart Peaks.

The Dudidontu River flows north to the Nahlin River, which flows west for about 8 km (5.0 mi) to meet the Sheslay River, forming there the commencement of the Inklin River, the main southeast fork of the Taku River, which flows through the Taku Plateau before entering Alaska and emptying into the sea at Taku Inlet near Juneau.

The historic Yukon Telegraph Trail follows the lower, northern portion of Kakuchuya Creek. The trail and route of the old telegraph line leaves Kakuchuya Creek near Matsatu Creek and heads north to Callison Ranch, then north along the Koshin River and on to Atlin, British Columbia.

== See also ==
- List of rivers of British Columbia
