= Middle Creek (Tahltan River tributary) =

Tributary of the Tahitan River, BC, Canada

- Mouth of Middle Creek

Location
- Country: Canada
- Province: British Columbia
- District: Cassiar Land District

Physical characteristics
- Source: Level Mountain
  - location: Nahlin Plateau
  - coordinates: 58°11′42″N 131°7′4″W
  - elevation: 1,262 m (4,140 ft)
- Mouth: Tahltan River
  - coordinates: 58°4′52″N 131°4′50″W
  - elevation: 386 m (1,266 ft)
- Length: 15 km (9.3 mi)
- Basin size: 49.6 km^{2} (19.2 sq mi),
- Discharge
  - average: 0.449 m^{3}/s (15.9 cu ft/s)

Basin features
- Topo map: NTS 104J3 Tahltan River

Middle Creek is a tributary of the Tahltan River, part of the Stikine River watershed in northwest part of the province of British Columbia, Canada. It flows generally south for roughly 15 km (9.3 mi) to join the Tahltan River about 10 km (6.2 mi) north of Tahltan, British Columbia at the Tahltan River's confluence with the Stikine River. Middle Creek's watershed covers 49.6 km^{2} (19.2 sq mi), and its mean annual discharge is estimated at 0.449 m^{3}/s (15.9 cu ft/s). The mouth of Middle Creek is located about 20 km (12 mi) north of Telegraph Creek, British Columbia, about 75 km (47 mi) southwest of Dease Lake, British Columbia, and about 197 km (122 mi) east of Juneau, Alaska. Middle Creek's watershed's land cover is classified as 45.2% shrubland, 30.8% conifer forest, 21.4% mixed forest, and small amounts of other cover.

Middle Creek is in the traditional territory of the Tahltan First Nation, of the Tahltan people.

== Geography ==
Middle Creek originates on the southeast edge of the massive Level Mountain shield volcano, about 35 km (22 mi) south-southeast of Meszah Peak, the highest peak of the Level Mountain Range, a cluster of bare peaks on the summit of Level Mountain. From its source near Beatty Creek, Mansfield Creek, and the Little Tuya River, the creek flows generally south and through wetlands and a forested gorge to the Tahltan River. Middle Creek's main tributary, Riley Creek, joins near the mouth of Middle Creek.

== See also ==
- List of rivers of British Columbia
