= Level Mountain =

Volcanic complex in British Columbia, Canada

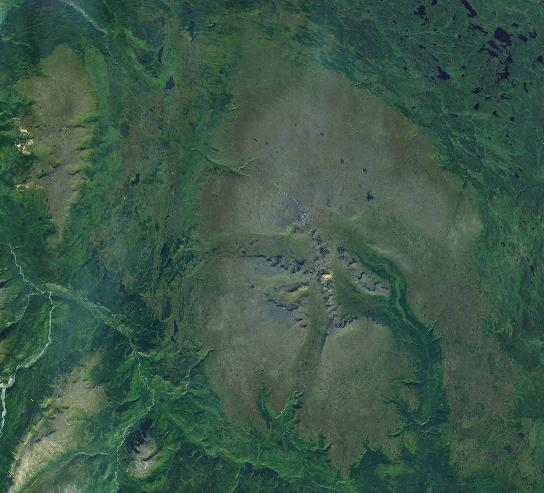
- Satellite image of Level Mountain (middle-right) and Heart Peaks (upper-left corner). This image is approximately 80 km (50 mi) east–west.

Highest point
- Peak: Meszah Peak
- Elevation: 2,164 m (7,100 ft)
- Listing: Mountains of British Columbia
- Coordinates: 58°28′43″N 131°26′14″W

Dimensions
- Length: 70 km (43 mi)
- Width: 45 km (28 mi)
- Area: 1,800 km^{2} (690 mi^{2})
- Volume: 860 km^{3} (210 mi^{3})

Geography
- Location in British Columbia
- Country: Canada
- Province: British Columbia
- District: Cassiar Land District
- Parent range: Nahlin Plateau
- Topo map(s): NTS 104J12 Dudidontu River; NTS 104J11 Granite Lake; NTS 104J6 Beatty Creek; NTS 104J5 Ketchum Lake; NTS 104J3 Tahltan River

Geology
- Formed by: Shield volcano (basal feature), stratovolcano, lava domes, spatter cones, tuyas (overlying features)
- Rock age: Less than 15 million years old
- Rock type(s): Alkali basalt, ankaramite, trachyte, rhyolite, phonolite
- Volcanic zone: Northern Cordilleran Province
- Last eruption: Unknown

Level Mountain is a large volcanic complex in the Northern Interior of British Columbia, Canada. It is located 50 kilometres (31 miles) north-northwest of Telegraph Creek and 60 km (37 mi) west of Dease Lake on the Nahlin Plateau. With a maximum elevation of 2,164 metres (7,100 feet), it is the second-highest of four large complexes in an extensive north–south trending volcanic region. Much of the mountain is gently sloping; when measured from its base, Level Mountain is about 1,100 m (3,600 ft) tall, slightly taller than its neighbour to the northwest, Heart Peaks. The lower, broader half of Level Mountain consists of a shield-like structure whereas its upper half has a more steep, jagged profile. Its broad summit is dominated by the Level Mountain Range, a small mountain range with prominent peaks cut by deep valleys. These valleys serve as a radial drainage for several small streams that flow from the mountain. Meszah Peak is the only named peak in the Level Mountain Range.

The mountain began forming about 15 million years ago and has experienced volcanism up until geologically recent times. There have been four stages of activity throughout the long volcanic history of Level Mountain. The first stage commenced 14.9 million years ago with the eruption of voluminous lava flows; these created a large shield volcano. The second stage began 7.1 million years ago to form a structurally complicated stratovolcano located centrally atop the shield. A series of lava domes was established during the third stage, which began 4.5 million years ago. This was followed by the fourth and final stage with the eruption of lava flows and small volcanic cones in the last 2.5 million years. A wide range of rock types were produced during these stages, namely ankaramites, alkali basalts, trachybasalts, mugearites, hawaiites, phonolites, trachytes and rhyolites. Alkali basalts and ankaramites are the most voluminous and form most of Level Mountain. The remaining rock types are less extensive and are largely restricted to the central region of the volcanic complex. Several types of volcanic eruptions produced these rocks.

Level Mountain lies in one of many ecoregions throughout British Columbia. It can be ecologically divided into three sections: lodgepole pine and white spruce forests at its base, bog birch and subalpine fir forests on its flanks, and an alpine climate at its summit. The extent and flatness of the alpine on Level Mountain have produced many Arctic affinities that are particularly noticeable in the local biota. Several animal species thrive in the area of Level Mountain, caribou being the most abundant. A trading post was established at Level Mountain in the 1890s, followed by geological studies of the mountain from the 1920s onwards. This remote area of Cassiar Land District has a relatively dry environment compared to the Coast Mountains in the west. Due to its remoteness, Level Mountain can only be accessed by air or by trekking great distances on foot. The closest communities are more than 30 km (19 mi) away from the mountain.

== Geography and geomorphology ==
=== Structure ===
Level Mountain has a volume of 860 km^{3} (210 mi^{3}) and an area of 1,800 km^{2} (690 mi^{2}), although at least one estimate of its areal extent is as much as 3,000 km^{2} (1,200 mi^{2}). Because of its great extent Level Mountain can be seen from outer space. This, coupled with snow and elevation, helps define the geology of the region. Level Mountain dominates the Nahlin Plateau, a subdivision of the larger Stikine Plateau.

Level Mountain consists of two principal components: a voluminous basal shield volcano and an overlying eroded stratovolcano. The lower, but more extensive basal shield volcano rises from an elevation of 900 to 1,400 m (3,000 to 4,600 ft) above the surrounding forested lowlands much like an inverted dishware plate. It is 70 km (43 mi) long and 45 km (28 mi) wide with a net altitudinal reach of only 750 m (2,460 ft). This part of the mountain forms a broad, oval-shaped, north–south trending lava plateau on which local streams flow. The south and west sides of the plateau are marked by a well-defined, but dissected escarpment. In contrast, the north and east plateau boundaries are less clear. V-shaped stream canyons occur along the lava plateau margin, exposing a section of Tertiary basalts along the Grand Canyon of the Stikine.

From an elevation of 1,400 m (4,600 ft) onwards the overlying stratovolcano is dominant. Ridges and peaks prevail at an elevation of 1,520 m (4,990 ft) and form the Level Mountain Range. These rise more steeply to 1,980 m (6,500 ft), eventually reaching the highest point of 2,164 m (7,100 ft) at Meszah Peak. Therefore, when viewed from a distance, Level Mountain appears unusually flat except for a number of black peaks on its summit which have the appearance of enormous volcanic cones.

=== Biogeography ===
Level Mountain is in the Stikine Plateau Ecosection, an area of partially dissected upland characterized by rounded ridges and wide valleys. It contains several small lakes, marshes, muskegs and streams, the latter of which drain into the Stikine, Taku and Liard watersheds. Boreal black and white spruce are present in valley bottoms, black spruce being commonly found around wetlands such as muskegs. Level Mountain has been described as the most impressive feature in the Stikine Plateau Ecosection; it is one of the few locations in this ecosection where alpine vegetation can be found. Although alpine vegetation of the Stikine Plateau Ecosection can be lush and grass-rich above the tree line, wetlands and muskegs are the dominant ecosystems on Level Mountain.

The Stikine Plateau Ecosection is one of seven ecosections composing the Boreal Mountains and Plateaus Ecoregion, a large ecological region of northwestern British Columbia encompassing high plateaus and rugged mountains with intervening lowlands. Boreal forests of black and white spruce occur in the lowlands and valley bottoms of this ecoregion whereas birch, spruce and willow form forests on the mid-slopes. Extensive alpine altai fescue covers the upper slopes, but barren rock is abundant at higher elevations. A cold, dry boreal mountain climate characterizes this ecoregion.

==== Plants ====
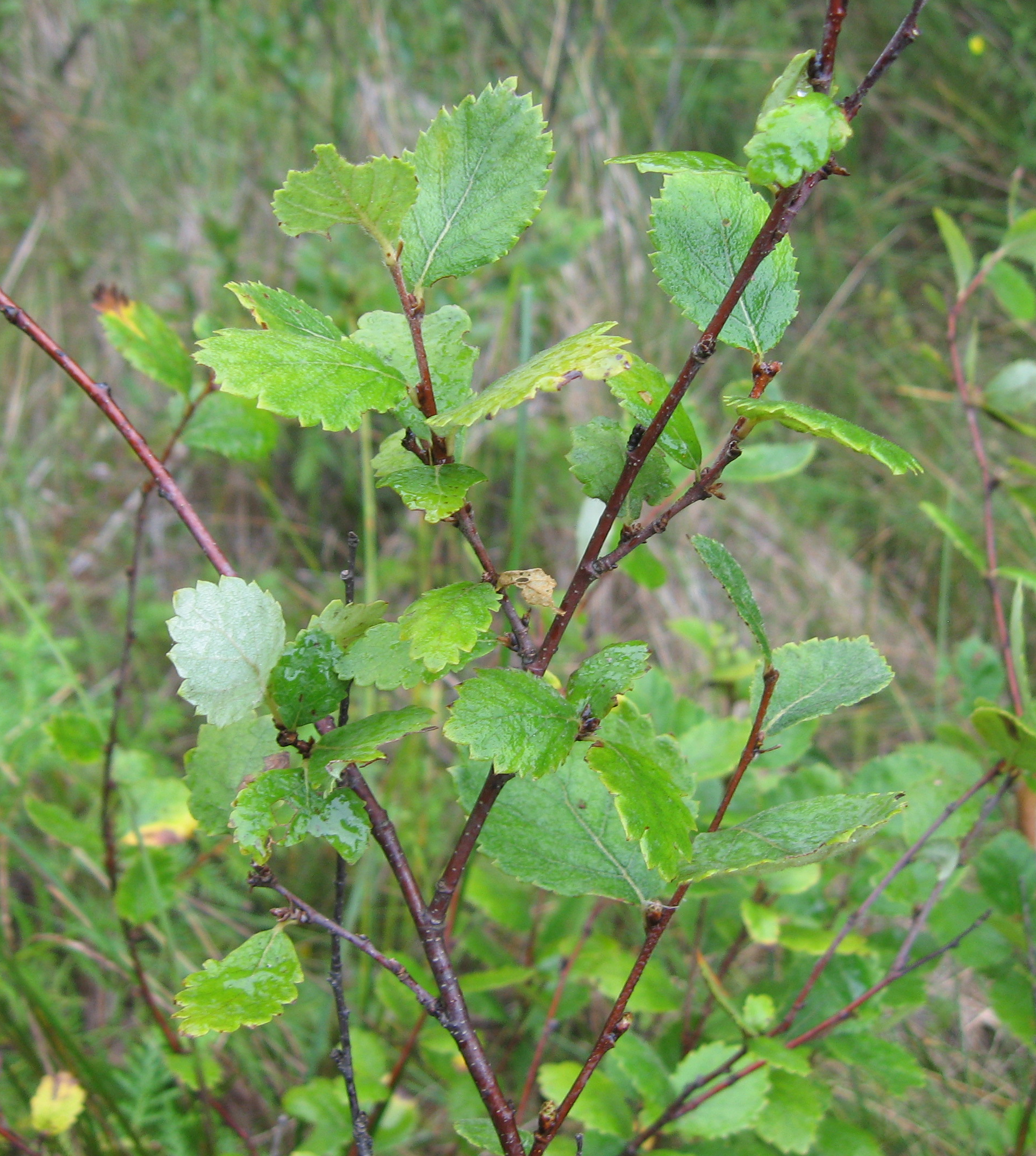
A pair of bog birch trees at Cedar Bog, Ohio. Such trees are present at Level Mountain.

Level Mountain is characterized by three biophysical zones. The first zone, below an elevation of 1,200 m (3,900 ft), is predominated by vegetation of the Pinaceae and Betulaceae families. lodgepole pine is associated with communities of kinnikinnick, bog birch, Altai fescue and moss. Mature white spruce and lodgepole pine forests dominate north of Level Mountain where bog birch occurs in river valley bottoms.

The second biophysical zone lies between elevations of 1,200 and 1,540 m (3,940 and 5,050 ft). It is characterized by a harsh climate with wind, cold temperatures, snow and short growing seasons. Bog birch is the dominant vegetation, forming extremely large areas of continuous cover. Mature subalpine fir forests have been extensively burned by large wildfires and are now limited only to the northern flank of Level Mountain.

The third biophysical zone consists largely of an alpine tundra above an elevation of 1,540 m (5,050 ft) on the upper lava plateau. As a result, this region lacks trees because of its high altitude. The most common vegetation is Arctic bluegrass, dwarf willows, louseworts, Altai fescue, boreal mugwort and alpine lichens and mosses. Bog birch less than 1 m (3.3 ft) in height form at lower elevations of this biophysical zone. Common plants on the sparsely vegetated slopes of the Level Mountain Range are sedges, prickly and alpine brook saxifrages, dwarf willows, moss campion, Arctic bluegrass and alpine lichens and mosses.

==== Animals ====
The area contains a caribou herd that is part of a larger population extending west of the Dease River and north of the Stikine River into Yukon. More than 400 caribou were identified at Level Mountain in 1978, although the Ministry of Environment and Parks considered the herd to be declining due to poor recruitment. By 1980, the caribou population was estimated to have been roughly 350. Level Mountain caribou is represented in the American Museum of Natural History as part of the Hall of North American Mammals. Grizzly bears are common in the alpine of Level Mountain and are potential predators of newborn caribou calves. Wolves occupy valleys and use the alpine areas for hunting and denning. Other animals in the area include long-tailed jaegers, mountain goats, ptarmigans, moose, long-tailed ducks and stone sheep.

=== Soils ===
A variety of soil types with differing physical properties are found at Level Mountain. Shallow, coarse, textured and steep to strongly sloping soils dominate peaks of the Level Mountain Range and owe their origin to weathering of volcanic rocks. These well-drained soils are strongly acidic and xeric in nature and show little or no horizon development. The gently undulating alpine portions of Level Mountain have been affected by cryoturbation, resulting in patterned ground in which coarse material has been separated from each other as patches or stripes. Surface horizons are strongly to very strongly acidic, becoming medium to slightly acidic approximately 50 centimetres (20 inches) in depth. At lower elevations, soils develop on fluvioglacial deposits. Many of these fluvioglacial materials contain a high percentage of fine materials whereas the soils which have developed from them contain a subsurface horizon enriched by clay accumulation. Very poorly drained organic soils are extensive on the southern portion of the lava plateau.

=== Climate ===
The climate of Level Mountain is influenced by the presence of the Coast Mountains to the west, which disrupt the flow of the prevailing westerly winds. This disruption causes the winds to drop most of their moisture onto the western slopes of the Coast Mountains before reaching the Nahlin Plateau, casting a rain shadow over Level Mountain. Because the mountain has a gently sloping and flat profile, it has subtle differences in climate, particularly at the low to upper-mid elevations. Therefore, a relatively homogeneous climate extends over Level Mountain; only gradual temperature and precipitation gradients occur altitudinally. As a result, the mountain lacks a wide diversity of local climates for large mammals.

Travel from high to low elevations below 1,700 m (5,600 ft) in the winter can be difficult for some mammals due to the accumulation of snow. Above 1,700 m (5,600 ft), exposure to local winds is improved and ridges of snow are cleared on steeper slopes. Wind speeds increase with elevation, but the distribution of wind over the area is fairly uniform. Level Mountain experiences relatively light snowfall unlike the Coast Mountains.

During the late May and early June calving season, winds predominate from a southerly quadrant. Calm conditions are infrequent and average monthly wind speeds are on the order of 3 to 4 m (9.8 to 13.1 ft) per second. At an elevation of 1,370 m (4,490 ft), there is a 15–20% chance that precipitation will occur as snow; that probability increases with altitude. Mixed rain and snow are common at that time of the year. Reduced air drainage, coupled with clear calm nights, lowers minimum temperatures in the summer, reducing the frost-free period.

=== Drainage ===
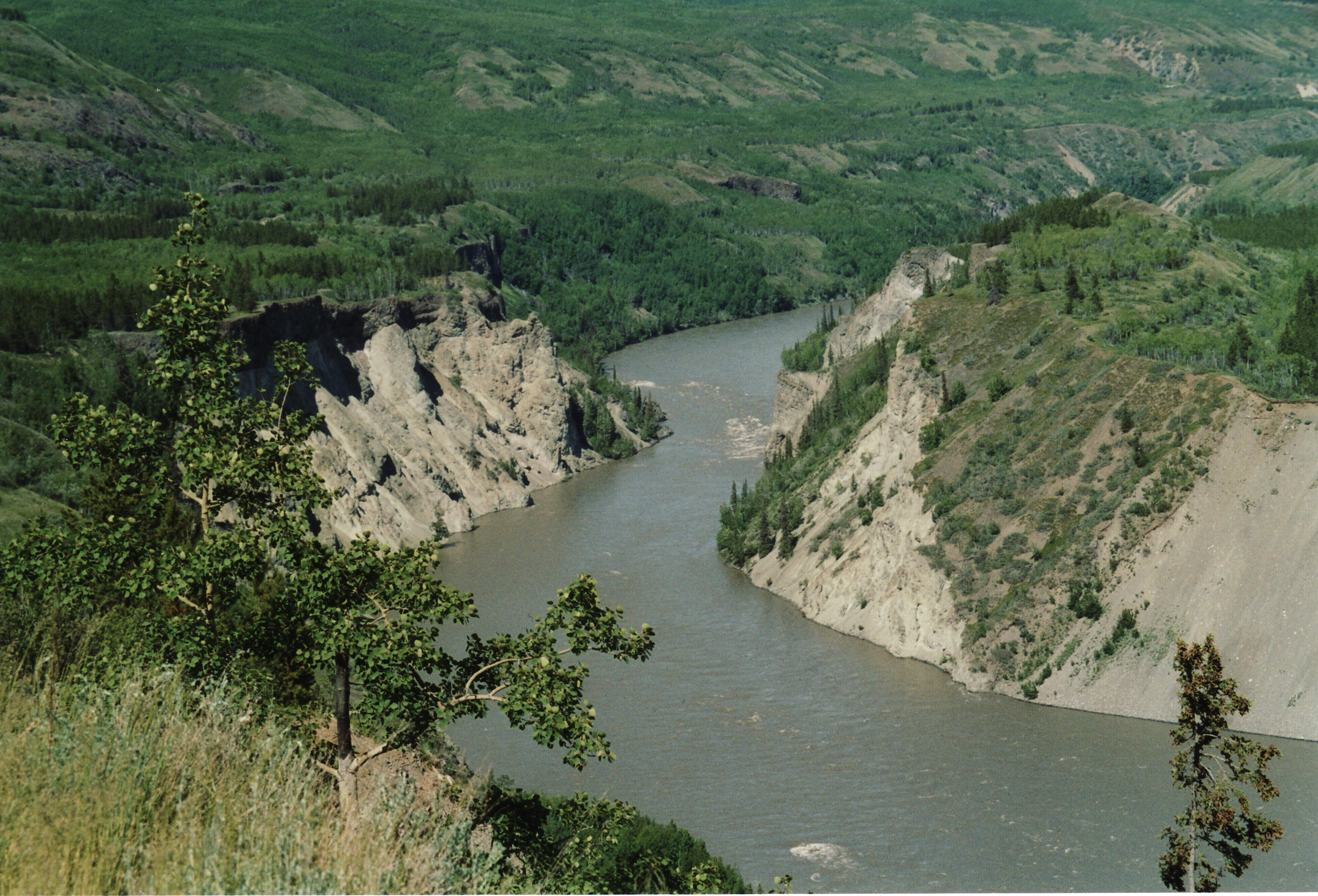
The Stikine River drains Level Mountain via tributaries that flow adjacent to the mountain.

The southern and eastern sides of Level Mountain are drained by streams within the Stikine River watershed. To the south, the Tahltan River gathers five named tributaries draining the southern side of Level Mountain. The first tributary is the Little Tahltan River which flows to the southeast. Bear Creek, the second tributary, flows to the south north of Glenora. The third tributary is Beatty Creek which flows to the south north of Telegraph Creek. Middle Creek, the fourth tributary, flows to the south near Beatty Creek. It contains one named tributary, Riley Creek, which flows to the southwest. The fifth named Tahltan River tributary draining the southern side of Level Mountain is Hartz Creek which flows to the south. To the east, the Tuya River gathers two named tributaries draining the eastern side of Level Mountain. The first tributary is the Little Tuya River which flows to the southeast. It contains one named tributary, Mansfield Creek, which flows to the east. The second named Tuya River tributary draining the eastern side of Level Mountain is Classy Creek which flows to the southeast.

The northern and western sides of Level Mountain are drained by streams within the Nahlin River watershed. To the west, the Dudidontu River flows to the northwest and gathers one named tributary draining the western side of Level Mountain. This tributary, Kakuchuya Creek, flows to the north and gathers Matsatu Creek which flows to the northwest from the western side of Level Mountain where it has cut a large steep-sided gorge into the western escarpment. The Koshin River flows to the north from the western side of Level Mountain and gathers two named tributaries. These two tributaries, Lost Creek and Kaha Creek, also drain the western side of Level Mountain and flow to the northwest and west, respectively. The only named stream draining the northern side of Level Mountain is Megatushon Creek which flows to the north.

The southwestern side of Level Mountain is drained by streams within the Sheslay River watershed. Egnell Creek is the only named stream in this watershed draining Level Mountain. It flows southwest into the mouth of the Hackett River just above the junction with the Shesley River.

=== Glaciology ===
Intense glaciation has taken place at Level Mountain in the last 5.33 million years, as shown by the presence of strongly developed glacial grooves reaching elevations greater than 1,675 m (5,495 ft). This evidence indicates that much of the mountain was covered by ice during past glacial periods; the latest glacial period ended approximately 12,000 years ago. Several U-shaped valleys have been carved into Level Mountain by radially directed alpine glaciers. They serve as a radial drainage for Kakuchuya Creek, Beatty Creek, Lost Creek, Kaha Creek, the Dudidontu River and the Little Tahltan River. The Kakuchuya and Beatty creek valleys have been eroded to a level below that of the plateau surface.

Periglacial processes, such as cryoturbation and stone striping, occur on Level Mountain at elevations greater than 1,250 m (4,100 ft). Cryoturbation takes place mainly on flat and gently sloping areas whereas stone striping happens primarily on gently sloping areas adjacent to peaks of the Level Mountain Range. Some of the steeper slopes of the Level Mountain Range are confined to nivation (Note: Nivation is erosion caused by freezing and thawing due to snow.) and solifluction. (Note: Solifluction is soil creep caused by waterlogged soil slowly moving downhill on top of an impermeable layer.) Snow avalanches are limited only to the Level Mountain Range and the steepest slopes.

== Geology ==
=== Background ===
Level Mountain is part of the Northern Cordilleran Volcanic Province (NCVP), a broad area of shield volcanoes, lava domes, cinder cones and stratovolcanoes extending from northwestern British Columbia northwards through Yukon into easternmost Alaska. The dominant rocks that make up these volcanoes are alkali basalts and hawaiites, but nephelinites, basanites and peralkaline (Note: Peralkaline rocks are magmatic rocks that have a higher ratio of sodium and potassium to aluminum.) phonolites, trachytes and comendites are locally abundant. These rocks were deposited by volcanic eruptions from 20 million years ago to as recently as a few hundred years ago. Volcanism in the Northern Cordilleran Volcanic Province is thought to be due to rifting of the North American Cordillera, driven by changes in relative plate motion between the North American and Pacific plates.

Level Mountain is part of a subdivision of the NCVP called the Stikine Subprovince. This subprovince, confined to the Stikine region of northwestern British Columbia, consists of three other volcanic complexes: Heart Peaks, Hoodoo Mountain and Mount Edziza. The four complexes differ petrologically and/or volumetrically from the rest of the NCVP. Heart Peaks, Level Mountain and Mount Edziza are the largest NCVP centres by volume, the latter two of which have experienced volcanism for a much longer timespan than any other NCVP centre. Level Mountain, Hoodoo Mountain and Mount Edziza are the only NCVP centres that contain volcanic rocks of both mafic (Note: Mafic pertains to magmatic rocks that are relatively rich in iron and magnesium, relative to silicon.) and intermediate to felsic (Note: Felsic pertains to magmatic rocks that are enriched with silicon, oxygen, aluminum, sodium and potassium.) composition. The highest of the four complexes is Mount Edziza at 2,786 m (9,140 ft), followed by Level Mountain at 2,164 m (7,100 ft), Heart Peaks at 2,012 m (6,601 ft) and Hoodoo Mountain at 1,850 m (6,070 ft).

=== Composition ===
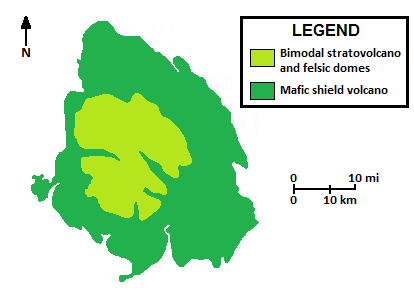
Geological map of Level Mountain showing the basal shield volcano and the overlying stratovolcano

Several rock types with varying chemical compositions make up Level Mountain. Ankaramites and alkali basalts are the main volcanic rocks composing the basal shield. Alkali basalts form columnar-jointed lava flows, vesicular lava flows, dikes (Note: A dike is a sheet-shaped intrusion of magma into pre-existing rock.) and scoria whereas ankaramites are present as dark-coloured lava flows with several columnar cooling units. Trachybasalts, phonolites, trachytes, peralkaline trachytes, rhyolites and peralkaline rhyolites (e.g. pantellerites and comendites) form the overlying stratovolcano and domes. They compose dikes, welded tuffs, (Note: Welded tuff is a volcanic deposit composed of consolidated ash that has been hardened by hot gases, the action of heat and pressure from overlying material.) pitchstones, volcanic plugs, laccoliths (Note: Laccoliths are subterranean magmatic bodies that have uplifted overlying rocks while in a molten state.) and flows. Trachybasalts are in the form of two textural types: phenocryst-rich lava flows and fragmental flow agglomerates. (Note: Agglomerate is a mass of angular volcanic fragments united by heat.) Phonolites are vesicular and pumiceous (Note: Pumiceous pertains to the texture of pumice, which is characterized by several small cavities that give it a spongy, frothy appearance.) in nature, although phonolites with trachytic (Note: Trachytic pertains to the texture of trachyte, which is characterized by crystals that show parallel alignment due to flow in the magma.) texture are also present. Trachytes and peralkaline trachytes are the main volcanic rocks in the Level Mountain Range. Rhyolites are in the form of stubby lava flows and domes. Comendites appear to have erupted more fluidly, forming lava tubes.

=== Basement and faulting ===
The basement of Level Mountain consists largely of felsic igneous rocks forming northern Stikinia, but sedimentary rocks are also present below the lava plateau escarpment. Two major northwest-trending faults straddle Level Mountain, both of which were active during the Mesozoic and Cenozoic eras. The King Salmon Fault forms a geological boundary between island arc rocks of Stikinia and seafloor rocks of the Cache Creek terrane. Paleozoic to Mesozoic rocks are exposed in the hanging wall of this thrust fault and are intensely cleaved, particularly near the sole of the thrust. The other planar fracture, Nahlin, is an east-dipping thrust fault extending several hundred kilometres from northern British Columbia into southern Yukon.

=== Tectonic uplift ===
Extensive tectonic uplift occurred at Level Mountain and elsewhere on the Stikine Plateau during the Neogene period. This resulted in dissection of the plateau surface by stream erosion which varies greatly across the region. The youthful V-shaped gorges along the lava plateau margin of Level Mountain are signs of continuing uplift, which may in part be caused by doming of the mountain during volcanism. Several outcrops of alkali basalt south of Kennicott Lake and the Tahltan River are comparable in age to the Level Mountain shield volcano and may represent erosional remnants of this structure.

=== Volcanic history ===
Level Mountain is the largest eruptive centre of the MEVC with respect to both volume and area covered. It has been the source of sporadic volcanic activity for the last 15 million years; this also makes it the most long-lived eruptive centre of the NCVP. Volcanism of the mountain has occurred throughout much of the existence of the NCVP, correlating with changes in the regional tectonics. Volcanic activity at first correlated with net compression across the North American and Pacific plates. However, new active plate motions between the two tectonic plates about 10 million years ago generated extensional stresses across the NCVP, resulting in lithospheric thinning and decompression melting of OIB-like mantle to produce alkaline Neogene magmatism. A return to net compression across the North American and Pacific plate boundaries commenced about four million years ago; magmatism since then has most likely resulted from a continuation of asthenospheric upwelling and local transtension along the two tectonic plates. The existence of olivine, orthopyroxene and spinel xenocrysts in Level Mountain basalt suggests that magmatic activity at Level Mountain originated from the upper mantle.

More than 20 eruptive centres are present on the summit and flanks of Level Mountain. These have produced mainly felsic and mafic lavas, a chemical composition range typical of bimodal volcanism. Like several other volcanic centres in northern British Columbia, Level Mountain was volcanically active during past glacial periods. Its involvement with glaciation resulted in several interactions between magma and ice, affording multiple examples of glaciovolcanic processes. Evidence for contemporaneous volcanism and glaciation is widespread throughout the mountain. This includes interlayered unconsolidated fluvioglacial and tuffaceous (Note: Tuffaceous pertains to sediments which contain up to 50% tuff.) deposits, tills and glacial erratics (Note: Glacial erratics are glacially deposited rocks differing from the size and type of rock native to the area in which they rest.) at the base of tuffs and lava flows, lahars composed of till and agglomerate, tuyas on the uppermost surface of the shield and as outliers, (Note: An outlier is an area of younger rock completely surrounded by older rocks.) till cemented by siliceous sinter, (Note: Siliceous sinter is a deposit of porous silica that forms around hot springs or geysers.) and the presence of freshwater pillow basalts and volcano-glacial tuff breccias. It is possible that geothermal outputs at Level Mountain had an influence on dynamics of past ice sheets much like the modern Grímsvötn caldera is an important heat source beneath Vatnajökull in Iceland. However, like other large volcanic centres in the NCVP, much of Level Mountain was formed prior to glaciation. Hiatuses of up to a million years or more can be expected between periods of volcanic activity at Level Mountain.

==== Mafic shield-building stage ====
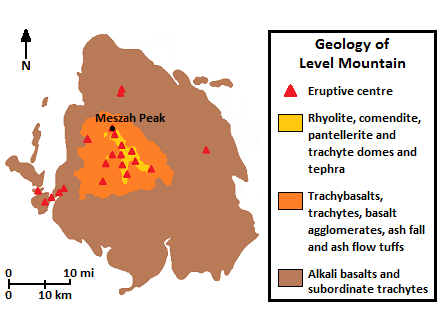
Geological map of Level Mountain showing eruptive products and eruptive centres

The mafic shield-building stage 14.9 to 6.9 million years ago began with the eruption of thin mafic lava flows over an erosion surface. Successive eruptions sent lava pouring in all directions from central vents, forming a broad, gently sloping volcano of flat, domical shape, with a profile much like that of a warrior's shield. Individual lava flows had an average thickness of 2 to 3 m (6.6 to 9.8 ft), but they ranged from less than 1 m (3.3 ft) to more than 10 m (33 ft) thick. Alkali basalts and ankaramites were the main lavas produced during this stage of activity which, due to their low silica content, were able to travel great distances away from their source. These lavas also erupted from vents on the flanks of the volcano. Blocky 'a'a and ropy pāhoehoe flows characterized the fluid and effusive nature of volcanism during this stage.

Lava flows of the mafic shield-building stage form four sub-horizontal units. Initial volcanism produced a 53 m (174 ft) thick sequence of columnar-jointed alkali basalt flows and altered grey-green vesicular basalts which make up the lowest unit. Subsequent activity deposited the overlying second 107 m (351 ft) thick unit. It contains up to seven 7.6 m (25 ft) thick columnar cooling units of alkali basalt that are separated by buff-weathered vesicular lava flows. Renewed volcanism deposited a 76 m (249 ft) thick sequence of massive ankaramite lava flows over the second unit. These lava flows, forming the third unit, are spheroidally weathered. (Note: Spheroidal weathering is a form of chemical weathering that results in the formation of concentric or spherical layers of decayed rock.) The mafic shield-building stage culminated with the emplacement of the fourth and highest unit. Eight to ten sequences of columnar-jointed alkali basalt flows compose this unit and have a total thickness of 122 m (400 ft). All four sub-horizontal units were deposited over a timespan of eight million years.

==== Bimodal stratovolcano stage ====
A second stage of volcanic activity 7.1 to 5.3 million years ago produced peralkaline, metaluminous, (Note: Metaluminous pertains to magmatic rocks that have a molar proportion of aluminum oxide lower than the combination of calcium oxide, sodium oxide and potassium oxide.) supersaturated and undersaturated lavas from several vents. This tremendous variation in the erupted magmas and influence of adjacent vents gave rise to a high and voluminous bimodal stratovolcano located centrally atop the shield. Mapping indicates that the headwaters of Kakuchuya Creek were the site of this large stratovolcano and that it grew greater than 2,500 m (8,200 ft) in elevation. Volcanic rocks of felsic composition, notably peralkaline trachyte and comendite, formed more than 80% of the stratovolcano. Explosive eruptions during this stage of activity deposited basalt agglomerates, ash fall and ash flow tuffs. Peralkaline felsic lava flows reached 7 km (4.3 mi) long and 3 to 8 m (9.8 to 26.2 ft) thick. The eruptive products of the bimodal stratovolcano stage were deposited over a timespan of 1.8 million years and cover an area roughly 20 km (12 mi) long and 20 km (12 mi) wide.

Peralkalinity had remarkable effects on lava morphology and mineralogy during the bimodal stratovolcano stage. A unique characteristic of the peralkaline felsic lava flows produced during this stage of activity is that although they were high in silica content, the flows were overly fluid in nature. This is because the peralkaline content decreased the viscosity of the flows a minimum of 10–30 times over that of calc-alkaline (Note: Calc-alkaline pertains to magmatic rocks consisting of 55–61% silica.) felsic flows. As a result of this fluidity, the peralkaline felsic lava flows were able to form small-scale folds and 1 to 2 m (3.3 to 6.6 ft) in diameter lava tubes. The liquidus temperatures of these flows were in excess of 1,200 degrees Celsius (2,190 degrees Fahrenheit) with viscosities as low as 100,000 poise. Glaciation and volcanism were contemporaneous during the bimodal stratovolcano stage as shown by the existence of volcano-glacial deposits in the volcanic edifice.

==== Felsic dome-forming stage ====
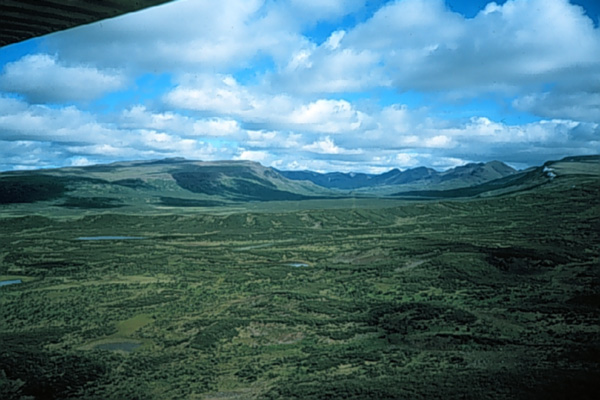
A U-shaped valley of Level Mountain with extensive elevated plateau in the foreground

By the Pliocene epoch, radially directed alpine glaciers had eroded away much of the bimodal stratovolcano, leaving behind a series of U-shaped valleys with intervening ridges that form the Level Mountain Range. This dissection of the bimodal stratovolcano was followed by the felsic dome-forming stage 4.5 million years ago. Eruptions of felsic magma were predominantly viscous during this stage of activity, resulting in the magma piling up around volcanic vents to create a series of lava domes. Individual domes grew up to 0.094 km^{3} (0.023 mi^{3}) in the glacially eroded core of the bimodal stratovolcano.

The felsic dome-forming stage extended over a timespan of two million years; Meszah Peak, the highest point of both Level Mountain and the Level Mountain Range, formed at the end of this stage 2.5 million years ago. Also emplaced at the end of this stage were comendite flows, ash flow tuffs and lava tubes.

==== Quaternary stage ====
A fourth and final stage of volcanism began on the summit of Level Mountain in the last 2.5 million years, depositing lava in and adjacent to the Level Mountain Range. This lava is indirectly dated as Pleistocene age, on the basis of the presence of intraglacial deposits. These deposits are in the form of pillow lavas, which were likely extruded into marginal glacial lakes high on the flanks of the mountain. More recent volcanic eruptions have been a topic of debate among scientists. Several small basaltic vents on the broad summit of Level Mountain were considered by T. S. Hamilton and C. M. Scafe (1977) to have formed during the Holocene epoch, although Holocene activity has been regarded as uncertain by B. R. Edwards and J. K. Russell (2000). These younger vents produced spatter cones, agglomerate and volcanic bombs, (Note: Volcanic bombs are rock fragments larger than 64 millimetres (2.5 inches) in diameter which form when a volcano ejects viscous fragments of lava during an eruption.) as well as trachybasalt, mugearite and hawaiite lava flows. This activity was concentrated on and near Meszah Peak and on ridges 14 km (8.7 mi) southeast and 10 km (6.2 mi) south-southwest of Meszah. Exposed on the south side of Level Mountain near Hatchau Lake is a rock outcrop consisting of boulders cemented together by calcareous sinter. This suggests an area of hot spring activity that may be related to volcanism at the mountain.

Two tephra deposits, collectively known as the Finlay tephras, occur in organic-rich mud in the Dease Lake and Finlay River areas. They both range in composition from phonolitic to trachytic and are 5 to 10 millimetres (0.20 to 0.39 inches) thick. Radiocarbon dating of terrestrial plant macrofossils 2 to 2.5 centimetres (0.79 to 0.98 inches) above the youngest tephra deposit suggest an early Holocene age for this volcanic material. Because Level Mountain has received little scientific study, it is a possible source for these tephra deposits along with Hoodoo Mountain, Heart Peaks and the Mount Edziza volcanic complex.

=== Hazards and monitoring ===
Like other volcanic centres in the NCVP, Level Mountain is not monitored closely enough by the Geological Survey of Canada to ascertain its activity level. The Canadian National Seismograph Network has been established to monitor earthquakes throughout Canada, but it is too far away to provide an accurate indication of activity under the mountain. It may sense an increase in seismic activity if Level Mountain becomes highly restless, but this may only provide a warning for a large eruption; the system might detect activity only once the mountain has started erupting. If Level Mountain were to erupt, mechanisms exist to orchestrate relief efforts. The Interagency Volcanic Event Notification Plan was created to outline the notification procedure of some of the main agencies that would respond to an erupting volcano in Canada, an eruption close to the Canada–United States border or any eruption that would affect Canada.

The lava plateau margins of Level Mountain are vulnerable to landslides. This is particularly true around the steep south and west plateau boundaries where relatively clay-rich, incompetent layers of agglomerates and tuffs are present between more competent basaltic lava flows. Remnants of a 60,000-cubic-metre (2,100,000-cubic-foot) mudflow are present on the eastern slope of the Little Tahltan canyon. Similar older scars, including those in Beatty Creek, are visible around much of the lava plateau parameter. Past eruptions of Level Mountain may have altered drainage patterns of local streams, but their actual effects remain unknown.

== Human history ==
=== Occupation ===
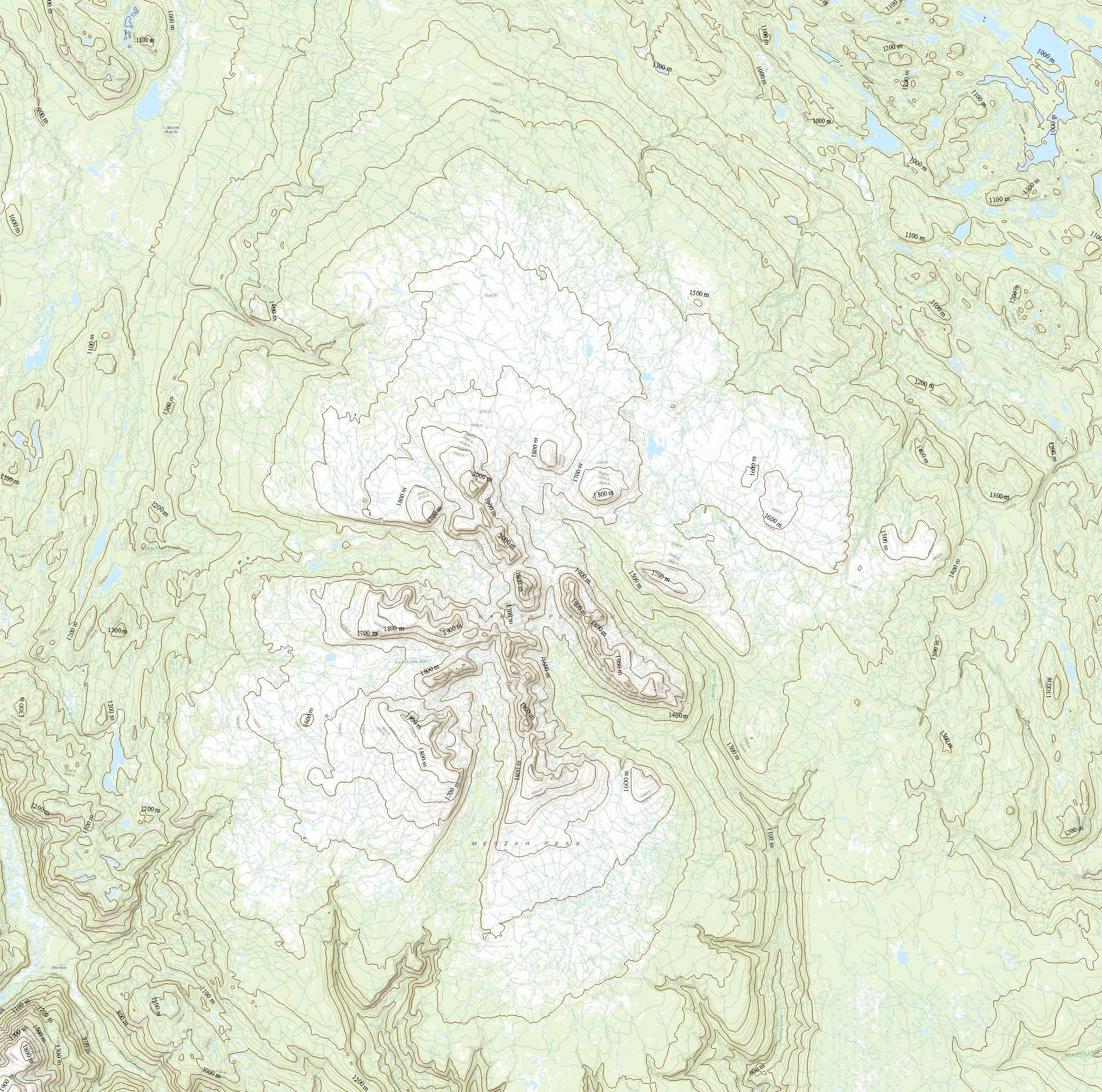
Topographic map of Level Mountain

In 1891–1892, the Hudson's Bay Company constructed a trail from the junction of the Sheslay and Hackett rivers to the southwestern slope of Level Mountain. Here, the company had built a trading post by 1898 named Egnell after its operator Albert Egnell. After spending one winter at the post, Egnell found that there was no trade to be done in the area and the post was subsequently abandoned. Egnell died on June 22, 1900, from an accidental gun shot to his leg by his son, McDonald, five days earlier and was buried at the Liard Post near the mouth of the Dease River.

In the early 1900s, the Egnell Post served as a repair station for the 3,100 km (1,900 mi) long Yukon Telegraph Line, which extended from Ashcroft, British Columbia, to Dawson City, Yukon. A small settlement consisting of a mission house and a number of other buildings had been established on the site by 1944. This settlement, named Sheslay, has since been abandoned. There is no human population within 30 kilometres (19 miles) of Level Mountain, but more than 630 people live within 100 km (62 mi).

Along the south side of Level Mountain are a number of other localities, including Hyland Ranch, Saloon, Salmon Creek Indian Reserve No. 3, Upper Tahltan Indian Reserve No. 4 and Tahltan Forks Indian Reserve No. 5. The northwestern side of Level Mountain is home to the Callison Ranch, which lies just east of Hatin Lake. Southeast of Level Mountain is the Days Ranch near the junction of the Tahltan and Stikine rivers. It was established by Ira Day in or before 1929 as a stopping place on the road from Dease Lake to Telegraph Creek. Day operated the ranch until he died around 1960, after which it remained abandoned for a time. In 2018, the Days Ranch was destroyed by a 30,000-hectare (74,000-acre) wildfire; more than 30 structures were burned.

=== Geological studies ===
The large size and remote location of Level Mountain has limited geological studies at this volcanic complex. Basalt and andesite flows were presented in the 1926 Canada Department of Mines Summary Report, 1925, Part A. The andesites were described as porphyritic (Note: Porphyritic pertains to the resemblance of porphyry which are magmatic rocks consisting of large crystals in a fine-grained matrix.) rocks with phenocrysts of feldspar of various size in a greyish or greenish matrix. (Note: The matrix is fine-grained background material in which large grains of a rock are embedded.) Both hornblende and augite andesites were noted to have been represented under a microscope. The basalts were described as black rocks with basic plagioclase with or without olivine and were noted in many cases to contain a considerable percentage of brownish glass. Although there was not sufficient time available to study these flows in detail, it was revealed at several points that the andesites formed the older and the basalts the younger flows. G. M. Dawson of the Geological Survey of Canada was able to demonstrate that on the Stikine River there were at least four flows of basalt. The basalts and andesites were considered to be younger than all the rocks they were observed in contact with, namely granitic intrusives, (Note: Intrusives are rocks forced while in a molten state into cracks or layers of other rocks.) porphyries and greenstones. More definitive evidence as to their age was obtained by W. A. Johnston and F. A. Kerr of the Geological Survey of Canada who placed them in the Tertiary. Some of the most recent lava flows of the Stikine valley were assigned as probably belonging to the Pleistocene.

A 3D model of Level Mountain

Level Mountain was demonstrated in the 1920s as a possible source for the extensive lavas in the neighbouring Tuya volcanic field. This field, consisting of flat-topped summits or benches, was considered to have formed as a result of block faulting or by erosion of a formerly much more extensive surface underlain by horizontally bedded volcanic rocks. The possibility of Level Mountain being a source for the Tuya field lavas would deteriorate in the 1940s when Canadian volcanologist Bill Mathews revealed that the flat-topped, steep-sided summits were not products of faulting or erosion, but were rather individual volcanoes formed by eruptions of lava into lakes thawed through an ice sheet. Mathews coined the term "tuya" for these subglacial volcanoes after Tuya Butte which is located in the Tuya volcanic field. The recognition of Level Mountain as a long-lived zone of volcanism in contrast to the small Tuya field volcanoes has given it status as a separate volcanic centre.

The mountain was identified by the mapping program of Operation Stikine in 1956. This program, masterminded by Canadian volcanologist Jack Souther, was carried out over the Stikine River area using a Bell helicopter. Reconnaissance mapping in 1962 by Jack Souther and Hu Gabrielse identified a sequence of lavas of late Tertiary to Quaternary age. Level Mountain was then studied by T. S. Hamilton in the 1970s who produced a detailed map and the first petrochemical study of the lavas. The andesites described in the 1920s were mapped as early Tertiary age, long before Level Mountain formed. Hamilton recognized the four distinctive stratigraphic units of the lava plateau, as well as the overlying bimodal package of alkali basalt and peralkaline lavas and tuffs.

In 1994, Carignnan et al. considered Level Mountain to be underlain by a mantle plume (Note: Mantle plumes are large columns of hot rock rising through the mantle.) or hotspot (Note: Hotspots are volcanic regions thought to be fed by underlying mantle that is anomalously hot compared with the surrounding mantle.) due to its proximity to a major continental divide between the Yukon, Arctic and Pacific watersheds. The high ^{206}Pb/^{204}Pb ratios in Level Mountain basalt were used as isotopic evidence to support this theory. However, P-wave studies conducted in 1998 by Frederikson et al. did not detect any geophysical anomalies near the mountain to justify the existence of a mantle plume or hotspot.

=== Naming ===
The name of the mountain is a reference to its plateau surface. It was adopted by the Geographical Names Board of Canada on December 21, 1944, as identified in the Canada Department of Mines Summary Report, 1925, Part A. The name appeared on National Topographic System (NTS) map 104/NE, but was replaced with the name Level Mountain Range on August 14, 1952, upon production of NTS map 104J. The reason for this name change was that cartographers were uncertain as to what the name Level Mountain referred to. They cited H. S. Bostock's 1948 report Physiography of the Canadian Cordillera, With Special Reference to the Area North of the Fifty-Fifth Parallel in which Bostock stated that Level Mountain was a small prominent mountain range on the Nahlin Plateau. Despite this misinterpretation, Level Mountain is still the local name for the entire volcanic edifice and the name Level Mountain Range for a group of steep peaks centered on the mountain's summit. Although the mountain appears level when viewed from a distance, it attains the shape of a large triangle when examined from the top of some of the high hills west of the bend of the Tuya River.

== Accessibility ==
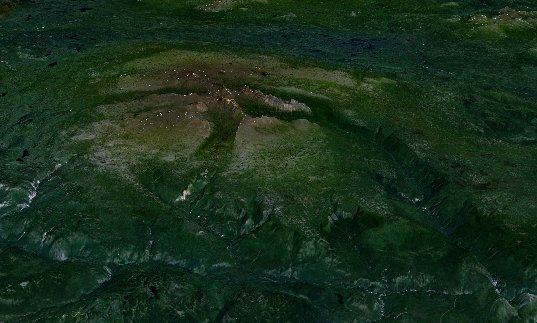
Satellite image of Level Mountain showing its gently sloping surface

Level Mountain lies in a remote location with no established road access. The closest route to this major volcanic complex is a graded road from Dease Lake to Telegraph Creek, which extends within 50 km (31 mi) of the mountain. From Telegraph Creek or Days Ranch the mountain may be reached by a 30 km (19 mi) long hike. Several small low-lying lakes surrounding Level Mountain provide float plane access, including Ketchum Lake, Hatin Lake and Granite Lake.

The Yukon Telegraph Trail, a historic pathway built in the 1890s, is still passable through Hatin Lake and provides an overland route to the shield volcano. Alternatively, fixed-wing aircraft landings can be made on a runway at Sheslay. Charter helicopter service in the small community of Dease Lake provides direct access to the Level Mountain Range. The alpine lava plateau of Level Mountain is easily travelled by horse or on foot during the snow-free period from June to September. Much of the area south of Level Mountain is impassable due to poorly drained fens.

== See also ==
- List of Northern Cordilleran volcanoes
- List of volcanoes in Canada
- Volcanism of Western Canada
