= Mansfield Creek =

- Mouth of Mansfield Creek

Location
- Country: Canada
- Province: British Columbia
- District: Cassiar Land District

Physical characteristics
- Source: Level Mountain
  - location: Nahlin Plateau
  - coordinates: 58°18′32″N 131°6′3″W
  - elevation: 1,310 m (4,300 ft)
- Mouth: Little Tuya River
  - coordinates: 58°15′14″N 130°47′15″W
  - elevation: 627 m (2,057 ft)
- Length: 35 km (22 mi)
- Basin size: 143 km^{2} (55 sq mi),
- Discharge
  - average: 1.46 m^{3}/s (52 cu ft/s)

Basin features
- Topo maps: NTS 104J2 Classy Creek; NTS 104J3 Tahltan River; NTS 104J6 Beatty Creek; NTS 104J7 Little Tuya River

Mansfield Creek is a tributary of the Little Tuya River, which in turn is a tributary of the Tuya River, part of the Stikine River watershed in northwest part of the province of British Columbia, Canada. It flows generally south and east for roughly 35 km (22 mi) to join the Little Tuya River about 4.5 km (2.8 mi) west-northwest of the Little Tuya's confluence with the Tuya River. Mansfield Creek's watershed covers 143 km^{2} (55 sq mi), and its mean annual discharge is estimated at 1.46 m^{3}/s (52 cu ft/s). The mouth of Mansfield Creek is located about 45 km (28 mi) northeast of Telegraph Creek, British Columbia, about 50 km (31 mi) west-southwest of Dease Lake, British Columbia, and about 210 km (130 mi) east of Juneau, Alaska. Mansfield Creek's watershed's land cover is classified as 40.5% shrubland, 35.3% conifer forest, 17.6% mixed forest, and small amounts of other cover.

Mansfield Creek is in the traditional territory of the Tahltan First Nation, of the Tahltan people.

== Geography ==
Mansfield Creek originates on the south flank of the massive Level Mountain shield volcano, about 27 km (17 mi) southeast of Meszah Peak, the highest peak of the Level Mountain Range, a cluster of bare peaks on the summit of Level Mountain. From its source near the large U-shaped valley through which Beatty Creek runs, Mansfield Creek flows generally south then east through wetlands, lakes, and barren lands atop Level Mountain's high lava plateau. From this high plateau Mansfield Creek enters a steep forested canyon carved into the escarpment on Level Mountain's southeastern edge, through which the creek flows east to empty into the Little Tuya River.

== See also ==
- List of rivers of British Columbia
