= Kaha Creek =

- Mouth of Kaha Creek

Location
- Country: Canada
- Province: British Columbia
- District: Cassiar Land District

Physical characteristics
- Source: Level Mountain
  - location: Nahlin Plateau
  - coordinates: 58°33′29″N 131°24′11″W
  - elevation: 1,645 m (5,397 ft)
- Mouth: Koshin River
  - coordinates: 58°41′15″N 131°41′24″W
  - elevation: 910 m (2,990 ft)
- Length: 30 km (19 mi)
- Basin size: 95.1 km^{2} (36.7 sq mi),
- Discharge
  - average: 1.19 m^{3}/s (42 cu ft/s)

Basin features
- Topo map: NTS 104J12 Dudidontu River; NTS 104J11 Granite Lake

Kaha Creek is a tributary of the Koshin River in northwest part of the province of British Columbia, Canada. It flows generally northwest for roughly 30 km (19 mi) to join the Koshin River about 3.8 km (2.4 mi) north of Hatin Lake, and about 6 km (3.7 mi) north of Callison Ranch. Kaha Creek's watershed covers 95.1 km^{2} (36.7 sq mi), and its mean annual discharge is estimated at 1.19 m^{3}/s (42 cu ft/s). The mouth of Kaha Creek is located about 93 km (58 mi) north of Telegraph Creek, British Columbia, about 165 km (103 mi) east of Juneau, Alaska, and about 103 km (64 mi) west of Dease Lake, British Columbia. Kaha Creek's watershed's land cover is classified as 41.1% conifer forest, 40.2% shrubland, 12.3% barren, and small amounts of other cover.

Kaha Creek is in the traditional territory of the Tlingit Taku River Tlingit First Nation and the Tahltan First Nation, of the Tahltan people.

== Geography ==
Kaha Creek originates on the north side of the massive Level Mountain shield volcano, near the headwaters of Lost Creek, Matsatu Creek, and Megatushon Creek, about 9 km (5.6 mi) north of Meszah Peak, the highest peak of the Level Mountain Range, a cluster of bare peaks on the summit of Level Mountain. The creek flows north and northwest, first through Level Mountain's high and relatively barren lava plateau, then through rugged forested terrain. In its final 2 km (1.2 mi) Kaha Creek enters the Koshin River's floodplain. It empties into the Koshin River in the wetlands along the river north of Hatin Lake. The historic Yukon Telegraph Trail, following the Koshin River, crosses Kaha Creek near its mouth.

== See also ==
- List of rivers of British Columbia
