= Bear Creek (Tahltan River tributary) =

- Mouth of Bear Creek

Location
- Country: Canada
- Province: British Columbia
- District: Cassiar Land District

Physical characteristics
- Source: Level Mountain Range
  - location: Level Mountain
  - coordinates: 58°18′20″N 131°24′41″W
  - elevation: 1,578 m (5,177 ft)
- Mouth: Tahltan River
  - coordinates: 58°7′15″N 131°18′2″W
  - elevation: 502 m (1,647 ft)
- Length: 28 km (17 mi)
- Basin size: 98.5 km^{2} (38.0 sq mi),
- Discharge
  - average: 1.17 m^{3}/s (41 cu ft/s)

Basin features
- Topo maps: NTS 104J6 Beatty Creek; NTS 104J3 Tahltan River

Bear Creek is a tributary of the Tahltan River in northwest part of the province of British Columbia, Canada. It flows generally south through the Nahlin Plateau about 28 km (17 mi) to join the Tahltan River just downstream from the Tahltan and Little Tahltan River confluence.

Bear Creek's watershed covers 98.5 km^{2} (38.0 sq mi), and its mean annual discharge is an estimated 1.17 m^{3}/s (41 cu ft/s). The mouth of the Bear Creek is located about 25 km (16 mi) north of Telegraph Creek, British Columbia, about 115 km (71 mi) east of Juneau, Alaska, and about 222 km (138 mi) southeast of Whitehorse, Yukon. Bear Creek's watershed's land cover is classified as 35.9% shrubland, 19.1% conifer forest, 16.5% herbaceous, 13.9% mixed forest, 13.3% barren, and small amounts of other cover.

Bear Creek is in the traditional territory of the Tahltan people.

== Geography ==
Bear Creek originates on the south flank of the massive Level Mountain shield volcano, about 15 km (9.3 mi) south of Meszah Peak, the highest peak of the Level Mountain Range, a cluster of bare peaks on the summit of Level Mountain. The creek flows south through Level Mountain's high and relatively barren lava plateau. After about 17 km (11 mi) Bear Creek enters a steep canyon carved into the escarpment on Level Mountain's southern edge. Shortly after this the creek is joined by several significant but unnamed tributaries that also flow south from Level Mountain's high lava plateau. These tributaries have also carved steep gorges into Level Mountain's southern escarpment. Below the escarpment the landscape is dominated by coniferous forests. Bear Creek continues south, collecting several more unnamed tributaries, until it reaches the Tahltan River about a kilometre east of the Little Tahltan confluence and the Indian reserve of "Tahltan Forks 5" of the Tahltan First Nation.

== See also ==
- List of rivers of British Columbia
