= Megatushon Creek =

- Mouth of Megatushon Creek

Location
- Country: Canada
- Province: British Columbia
- District: Cassiar Land District

Physical characteristics
- Source: Level Mountain
  - location: Nahlin Plateau
  - coordinates: 58°29′40″N 131°15′31″W
  - elevation: 1,555 m (5,102 ft)
- Mouth: Nahlin River
  - coordinates: 58°35′57″N 131°5′16″W
  - elevation: 995 m (3,264 ft)
- Length: 22 km (14 mi)
- Basin size: 52.7 km^{2} (20.3 sq mi),
- Discharge
  - average: 1.03 m^{3}/s (36 cu ft/s)

Basin features
- Topo map: NTS 104J11 Granite Lake

Megatushon Creek is a tributary of the Nahlin River, part of the Taku River watershed in northwest part of the province of British Columbia, Canada. It flows generally northeast and east for roughly 22 km (14 mi) to join the Nahlin River not far from the Nahlin's source south of Tachilta Lakes. Megatushon Creek's watershed covers 52.7 km^{2} (20.3 sq mi), and its mean annual discharge is estimated at 1.03 m^{3}/s (36 cu ft/s). The mouth of Megatushon Creek is located about 65 km (40 mi) west of Dease Lake, British Columbia, about 78 km (48 mi) north of Telegraph Creek, British Columbia, and about 120 km (75 mi) east of Juneau, Alaska. Megatushon Creek's watershed's land cover is classified as 34.8% barren, 32.3% shrubland, 24.8% conifer forest, and small amounts of other cover.

Megatushon Creek is in the traditional territory of the Tlingit Taku River Tlingit First Nation and the Tahltan First Nation, of the Tahltan people.

== Geography ==
Megatushon Creek originates on the east side of the massive Level Mountain shield volcano, near the headwaters of the Little Tuya River, Kaha Creek, Lost Creek, and Beatty Creek, and about 10 km (6.2 mi) east of Meszah Peak, the highest peak of the Level Mountain Range, a cluster of bare peaks on the summit of Level Mountain. The creek flows north, northwest, and east, first through Level Mountain's high and relatively barren lava plateau, then through rugged forested terrain, before emptying into the Nahlin River.

== See also ==
- List of rivers of British Columbia
