= Hartz Creek =

Tribuatary river in the country of Canada

- Mouth of Hartz Creek

Location
- Country: Canada
- Province: British Columbia
- District: Cassiar Land District

Physical characteristics
- Source: Level Mountain
  - location: Nahlin Plateau
  - coordinates: 58°9′41″N 130°56′39″W
  - elevation: 1,120 m (3,670 ft)
- Mouth: Tahltan River
  - coordinates: 58°2′57″N 130°59′59″W
  - elevation: 295 m (968 ft)
- Length: 14 km (8.7 mi)
- Basin size: 39.1 km^{2} (15.1 sq mi),
- Discharge
  - average: 0.315 m^{3}/s (11.1 cu ft/s)

Basin features
- Topo map: NTS 104J2 Classy Creek

Hartz Creek is a tributary of the Tahltan River, part of the Stikine River watershed in northwest part of the province of British Columbia, Canada. It flows generally south and southwest for roughly 14 km (8.7 mi) to join the Tahltan River about 4.5 km (2.8 mi) north of Tahltan, British Columbia at the Tahltan River's confluence with the Stikine River. Hartz Creek's watershed covers 39.1 km^{2} (15.1 sq mi), and its mean annual discharge is estimated at 0.315 m^{3}/s (11.1 cu ft/s). The mouth of Hartz Creek is located about 18 km (11 mi) northeast of Telegraph Creek, British Columbia, about 73 km (45 mi) southwest of Dease Lake, British Columbia, and about 200 km (120 mi) east of Juneau, Alaska. Hartz Creek's watershed's land cover is classified as 44.2% shrubland, 30.7% mixed forest, 20.8% conifer forest, and small amounts of other cover.

Hartz Creek is in the traditional territory of the Tahltan First Nation, of the Tahltan people.

== Geography ==
Hartz Creek originates on the southeast edge of the massive Level Mountain shield volcano, about 45 km (28 mi) southeast of Meszah Peak, the highest peak of the Level Mountain Range, a cluster of bare peaks on the summit of Level Mountain. The creek flows generally south and southwest through wetlands and a forested gorge to the Tahltan River a few kilometres west of Hiusta Lake, the locality of Hiusta Meadow, and the Tahltan Indian reserve "Hiusta's Meadow 2".

== See also ==
- List of rivers of British Columbia
