= Matsatu Creek =

River in British Columbia, Canada

- Mouth of Matsatu Creek

Location
- Country: Canada
- Province: British Columbia
- District: Cassiar Land District

Physical characteristics
- Source: Level Mountain
  - location: Nahlin Plateau
  - coordinates: 58°29′56″N 131°25′16″W
  - elevation: 1,700 m (5,600 ft)
- Mouth: Kakuchuya Creek
  - coordinates: 58°35′20″N 131°46′2″W
  - elevation: 940 m (3,080 ft)
- Length: 35 km (22 mi)
- Basin size: 912 km^{2} (352 sq mi)
- Discharge
  - average: 3.02 m^{3}/s (107 cu ft/s)

Basin features
- Topo map: NTS 104J11 Granite Lake; NTS 104J12 Dudidontu River

Matsatu Creek, historically called the Matsatu River, is a tributary of Kakuchuya Creek and part of the Taku River watershed in northwest part of the province of British Columbia, Canada. It is located 40 km (25 mi) north of the abandoned settlement of Sheslay in Cassiar Land District.

From its source at Level Mountain, where it has cut a large gorge into its western escarpment, Matsatu Creek flows generally north and west for roughly 35 km (22 mi) to join Kakuchuya Creek, the main tributary of the Dudidontu River. The Dudidontu River in turn flows into the Nahlin River, a tributary of the Inklin River, which flows into the Taku River.

Matsatu Creek's mean annual discharge is estimated at 3.02 m^{3}/s (107 cu ft/s). Its watershed covers 912 km^{2} (352 sq mi). The watershed's land cover is classified as 52.7% barren, 28.6% shrubland, 10.1% conifer forest, 5.0% herbaceous, and small amounts of other cover.

The mouth of Matsatu Creek is located about 85 km (53 mi) north of Telegraph Creek, British Columbia, about 105 km (65 mi) west of Dease Lake, British Columbia, and about 158 km (98 mi) east of Juneau, Alaska.

Matsatu Creek's watershed is within the traditional territory of the Tahltan First Nation, of the Tahltan people.

== Geography ==
Matsatu Creek originates on the slopes of Meszah Peak, the highest peak of the Level Mountain Range, a cluster of bare peaks on the summit of the massive Level Mountain shield volcano, which forms the most voluminous and most persistent eruptive centre in the Northern Cordilleran Volcanic Province. The source of Matsatu Creek is close to the upper reach of the Koshin River and near the sources of the Little Tuya River, Kakuchuya Creek, and Beatty Creek.

From its source Matsatu Creek flows north and west through a large gorge in the western escarpment of Level Mountain. As it continues flowing through the Nahlin Plateau, it collects numerous unnamed tributary streams. It flows just south of the headwaters of Lost Creek. Matsatu Creek joins Kakuchuya Creek about 1 km (0.62 mi) east from Kakuchuya Creek's confluence with the Dudidontu River.

== See also ==
- List of rivers of British Columbia
