= Little Tuya River =

- Mouth of Little Tuya River

Location
- Country: Canada
- Province: British Columbia
- District: Cassiar Land District

Physical characteristics
- Source: Level Mountain
  - location: Nahlin Plateau
  - coordinates: 58°29′31″N 131°22′4″W
  - elevation: 1,820 m (5,970 ft)
- Mouth: Tuya River
  - coordinates: 58°14′21″N 130°43′3″W
  - elevation: 500 m (1,600 ft)
- Length: 71 km (44 mi)
- Basin size: 569 km^{2} (220 sq mi),
- Discharge
  - average: 6.69 m^{3}/s (236 cu ft/s)

Basin features
- Topo maps: NTS 104J6 Beatty Creek; NTS 104J7 Little Tuya River

The Little Tuya River is a tributary of the Tuya River in northwest part of the province of British Columbia, Canada. It flows generally south and east about 71 km (44 mi) to join the Tuya River near Cariboo Meadows. The Little Tuya River's watershed covers 569 km^{2} (220 sq mi), and its mean annual discharge is an estimated 6.69 m^{3}/s (236 cu ft/s).

The mouth of the Little Tuya River is located about 45 km (28 mi) northeast of Telegraph Creek, British Columbia, about 48 km (30 mi) west-southwest of Dease Lake, British Columbia, and about 215 km (134 mi) east of Juneau, Alaska. The river's watershed's land cover is classified as 37.8% shrubland, 28.8% conifer forest, 14.6% mixed forest, 9.2% barren, and small amounts of other cover.

The Little Tuya River was named in association with the Tuya RIver. A tuya is a geologic term for a flat-topped, steep-sided volcano formed when lava erupts through a thick glacier or ice sheet. The geologic term comes from Tuya Butte, which was named in association with Tuya Lake. The term may come from the Tahltan language.

The Little Tuya River is in the traditional territory of the Tahltan First Nation, of the Tahltan people.

== Geography ==
The Little Tuya River originates on the east side of the massive Level Mountain shield volcano, near the headwaters of the Koshin River, Beatty Creek, and Matsatu Creek, and about 4.5 km (2.8 mi) east of Meszah Peak, the highest peak of the Level Mountain Range, a cluster of bare peaks on the summit of Level Mountain.

The river flows south and east, first through Level Mountain's high and relatively barren lava plateau, then through rugged forested terrain. Its lower course flows through rugged forested terrain, where it is joined by its main tributary, Mansfield Creek. The Little Tuya RIver empties into the Tuya River near the abandoned settlement of Cariboo Meadows.

== Geology ==
Coal has been found in rocks exposed in the drainage of the Little Tuya River and Mansfield Creek between the communities of Dease Lake and Telegraph Creek in northwestern BC. The coal was first discovered in 1904, but the main exploration of its economic potential occurred in the 1980s to 1990s.

== See also ==
- List of rivers of British Columbia
