= Classy Creek =

- Mouth of Classy Creek

Location
- Country: Canada
- Province: British Columbia
- District: Cassiar Land District

Physical characteristics
- Source: Level Mountain
  - location: Nahlin Plateau
  - coordinates: 58°10′58″N 131°0′36″W
  - elevation: 1,218 m (3,996 ft)
- Mouth: Tuya River
  - coordinates: 58°6′50″N 130°47′22″W
  - elevation: 529 m (1,736 ft)
- Length: 20 km (12 mi)
- Basin size: 108 km^{2} (42 sq mi),
- Discharge
  - average: 0.808 m^{3}/s (28.5 cu ft/s)

Basin features
- Topo map: NTS 104J2 Classy Creek

Classy Creek is a tributary of the Tuya River in northwest part of the province of British Columbia, Canada. It flows generally southeast and south roughly 20 km (12 mi) to join the Tuya River about 10 km (6.2 mi) north of the Tuya River's confluence with the Stikine River in the Grand Canyon of the Stikine, near Telegraph Creek Road, unofficially called Highway 51, a spur of the Stewart–Cassiar Highway.

Classy Creek's watershed covers 108 km^{2} (42 sq mi), and its mean annual discharge is estimated at 0.808 m^{3}/s (28.5 cu ft/s). The mouth of Classy Creek is located about 32 km (20 mi) northeast of Telegraph Creek, British Columbia, about 130 km (81 mi) east of Juneau, Alaska, and about 375 km (233 mi) southeast of Whitehorse, Yukon. Classy Creek's watershed's land cover is classified as 46.8% shrubland, 23.3% mixed forest, 20.3% conifer forest, and small amounts of other cover.

Classy Creek is in the traditional territory of the Tahltan people.

== Geography ==
Classy Creek originates among unnamed lakes on the south flank of the massive Level Mountain shield volcano, near the headwaters of Hartz Creek, Riley Creek, and Mansfield Creek, and about 55 km (34 mi) southeast of Meszah Peak, the highest peak of the Level Mountain Range, a cluster of bare peaks on the summit of Level Mountain. The creek flows first southwest then south through Level Mountain's high and relatively barren lava plateau. The Indian reserve "Classy Creek 8", of the Tahltan First Nation, is located about halfway along the creek's course where it turns south, just south of Mincho Lake. Near its mouth Classy Creek descends into the canyon of the Tuya River.

== See also ==
- List of rivers of British Columbia
