= Tahltan (disambiguation) =

Tahltan is the name of a Northern Athabaskan people in northwestern British Columbia, and also the name of their language. It may also refer to:

- the Tahltan Nation, a tribal council
- the Tahltan First Nation, one of the two member band governments of that tribal council
- the Tahltan River
  - the Upper Tahltan River
- Tahltan, British Columbia, at the confluence of the Stikine and Tahltan Rivers.
  - Tahltan Indian Reserve No. 1, at Tahltan, BC
  - Tahltan Forks Indian Reserve No. 5, at Tahltan, BC
  - Upper Tahltan Indian Reserve No. 4, near Tahltan, BC
  - Tahltan Indian Reserve No. 10, NE of Tahltan BC at the confluence of the Stikine and Klastline Rivers.
- the Tahltan Highland, a landform in the region
