= List of plateaus in British Columbia =

This is a list of plateaus and plateau-like landforms in British Columbia, Canada.

Plateau	Name status	NTS map	Coordinates	Region (or parent plateau/range)
Adams Plateau	Official	82M4 Adams Plateau	51°02′59″N 119°33′04″W	Shuswap
Alberta Plateau	Unofficial (rescinded)	94I Fontas River	57°59′59″N 122°00′05″W	Fort Nelson-Peace
Arctic Lake Plateau	Official	104G7 Mess Lake	57°17′59″N 130°46′06″W	Stikine
Big Raven Plateau	Official	104G10 Mount Edziza	57°42′59″N 130°45′06″W	Stikine
Bonaparte Plateau	Official	92P3 Loon Lake	51°08′59″N 121°17′04″W	Thompson-South Cariboo
Cariboo Plateau	Official	92L15 Broughton Island	50°48′59″N 118°49′04″W	Shuswap
Clayoquot Plateau	Official (park name is official)	92F3 Effingham River	49°13′29″N 125°25′50″W	Clayoquot Sound
Coutlee Plateau	Unofficial (rescinded)	92I2 Merritt	50°03′59″N 120°56′04″W	Nicola
Dease Plateau	Official	104P11 Dot Lake	59°34′59″N 129°30′06″W	Northern Interior
Dil-Dil Plateau	Official	92O3 Warner Pass	51°12′59″N 123°10′04″W	Chilcotin
Douglas Plateau	Official	92I8 Stump Lake	50°16′59″N 120°15′04″W	Nicola Country
Etsho Plateau	Official	94P6 Thetlaandoa Creek	59°14′59″N 121°30′05″W	Fort Nelson-Liard
Forbidden Plateau	Official	92F11 Forbidden Plateau	49°40′59″N 125°19′04″W	Mid-Vancouver Island
Fraser Plateau	Official	93B3 Alexis Creek	51°59′59″N 123°00′04″W	Central Interior
Green Timber Plateau	Official	92P6 Green Lake	51°14′59″N 121°30′04″W	South Cariboo
Interior Plateau	Official	93B3 Alexis Creek	51°59′59″N 123°00′04″W	BC Interior
Kawdy Plateau	Official	104O3 Nazcha Creek	59°14′59″N 131°30′07″W	Cassiar-Teslin
Kimberley Plateau	Official	82E2 Greenwood	49°11′59″N 118°51′04″W	East Kootenay
Kitsu Plateau	Official	104G7 Mess Lake	57°27′59″N 130°45′06″W	Stikine
Klastline Plateau	Official	104G16 Klastline River	57°56′59″N 130°05′06″W	Stikine
Kukwaus Plateau	Official	92P2 Criss Creek	51°14′59″N 120°45′04″W	Bonaparte Plateau
Level Mountain	Unofficial	104J6 Beatty Creek	58°23′45″N 131°24′06″W	Nahlin Plateau
Liard Plateau	Official	94N12 Vizer Creek	59°39′59″N 125°30′06″W	Northern Interior
McGregor Plateau	Official	93I6 Spakwaniko Creek	54°19′59″N 121°00′04″W	Central Interior-Rockies
Nahlin Plateau	Official	104J6 Beatty Creek	58°26′59″N 131°25′06″W	Cassiar-Teslin
Nechako Plateau	Official	93L Smithers	54°29′59″N 126°00′05″W	Central Interior
Nicoamen Plateau	Official	92I3 Prospect Creek	50°11′59″N 121°14′04″W	Lower Thompson-Cascades
Nicola Plateau	Official	92I7 Mamit Lake	50°19′59″N 120°37′04″W	Thompson-Nicola
Nipple Plateau	Unofficial (rescinded)	92H13 Scuzzy Mountain	49°50′59″N 121°38′04″W	Lillooet Ranges-Fraser Canyon
Nisutlin Plateau	Official	104N16 Gladys River	59°49′59″N 132°00′07″W	Atlin
Rabbit Plateau	Official	94M3 Scoop Lake	59°07′59″N 127°05′06″W	Northern Rockies-Liard
Red Plateau	Unofficial (rescinded)	92I15 Tranquille River	50°46′59″N 120°36′04″W	Bonaparte Plateau
Silwhoiakun Plateau	Official	92I15 Tranquille River	50°58′59″N 120°33′04″W	Bonaparte Plateau
Sitkum Plateau	Official	82L8 Mount Fosthall	50°24′19″N 118°15′30″W	East Kootenay
Skidegate Plateau	Unofficial (rescinded)	103F7 Rennell Sound	53°29′58″N 132°30′06″W	Haida Gwaii
Snowshoe Plateau	Official	93A14 Cariboo Lake	52°52′59″N 121°23′04″W	
Spatsizi Plateau	Official	104H16 Diamond Creek	57°49′59″N 128°29′06″W	Stikine
Stikine Plateau	Official	104I5 Tanzilla Butte	58°22′59″N 129°53′06″W	Stikine
Taku Plateau	Official	104K9 (untitled)	58°41′59″N 132°30′07″W	Taku-Teslin
Tanzilla Plateau	Official	104J8 Dease Lake	58°21′59″N 130°22′06″W	Stikine-Cassiar
Teslin Plateau	Official	104N10 Eva Lake	59°39′59″N 132°55′07″W	Teslin
Thompson Plateau	Official	92I1 Douglas Lake	50°14′59″N 120°30′04″W	Thompson-Okanagan-South Cariboo
Tranquille Plateau	Official	92I15 Tranquille River	50°53′59″N 120°35′04″W	Bonaparte-Kamloops
Trepanege Plateau	Official	92H16 Paradise Lake	49°50′59″N 120°08′04″W	Thompson Plateau
Yukon Plateau	Unofficial	104N11 Surprise Lake	59°39′59″N 133°05′07″W	Far Northern Interior
