= Dease Lake (disambiguation) =

Dease Lake is a community in northern British Columbia.

Dease Lake may also refer to:

- Dease Lake (British Columbia), a lake in northern British Columbia
- Dease Lake (ship, 1934), a boat of the Mackenzie River watershed
- Dease Lake Airport, British Columbia
