= Koshin River =

- Mouth of Koshin River

Location
- Country: Canada
- Province: British Columbia
- District: Cassiar Land District

Physical characteristics
- Source: Level Mountain
  - location: Nahlin Plateau
  - coordinates: 58°33′57″N 131°35′2″W
  - elevation: 1,465 m (4,806 ft)
- Mouth: Nahlin River
  - coordinates: 58°52′27″N 131°48′6″W
  - elevation: 614 m (2,014 ft)
- Length: 58 km (36 mi)
- Basin size: 437 km^{2} (169 sq mi),
- Discharge
  - average: 4.89 m^{3}/s (173 cu ft/s)

Basin features
- Topo maps: NTS 104J12 Dudidontu River; NTS 104J13 Prairie Lake

The Koshin River is a tributary of the Nahlin River in northwest part of the province of British Columbia, Canada. It flows generally north about 58 km (36 mi) to join the Nahlin River, which forms the Inklin River, one of the main tributaries of the Taku River. The Koshin River flows through the Nahlin Plateau. It joins the Nahlin River at the boundary between the Nahlin and Kawdy plateaus. Both plateaus are part of the larger Stikine Plateau region.

The Koshin River's watershed covers 437 km^{2} (169 sq mi), and its mean annual discharge is 4.89 m^{3}/s (173 cu ft/s). The mouth of the Koshin River is located about 165 km (103 mi) northeast of Juneau, Alaska and about 115 km (71 mi) north of Telegraph Creek, British Columbia. The Koshin River's watershed's land cover is classified as 43.0% conifer forest, 36.3% shrubland, 8.8% mixed forest, 5.4% barren, 2.5% wetland, and small amounts of other cover.

The Koshin River is in the traditional territories of the Taku River Tlingit First Nation, part of the Tlingit people, and the Tahltan First Nation, of the Tahltan people.

== Geography ==
The Koshin River originates on the north side of Level Mountain on the Nahlin Plateau. From its source the river flows generally north for about 58 km (36 mi). From its source it first flows northwest to Hatin Lake, just west of Callison Ranch. This headwater reach of the Koshin River lies just north of Matsatu Creek. From Hatin Lake the Koshin River flows north along a meandering course with many wetlands. Lost Creek joins the Koshin, flowing northwest from Level Mountain. A few kilometres downriver Kaha Creek joins the Koshin, also flowing northwest from Level Mountain. Continuing north the Koshin River passes by a number of lakes, including Tedideech Lake, before emptying into the Nahlin River at Nahlin Crossing.

The historic Yukon Telegraph Trail follows much of the Koshin River, passing through Callison Ranch and running north along the river to Nahlin Crossing.

== See also ==
- List of rivers of British Columbia
