= Boreal Mountains and Plateaus Ecoregion =

The Boreal Mountains and Plateaus Ecoregion is a large biogeoclimatic region in northwestern British Columbia, Canada. It is characterized by a complex of rugged mountains and intervening lowlands, and rolling, high plateaus. The ecoregion is bounded on the south by the Sub-Boreal Interior Ecoprovince, on the north by the upper Yukon River drainage basin, on the west by the Yukon-Stikine Highlands Ecoregion, and on the east by the Canadian Rockies. The Boreal Mountains and Plateaus Ecoregion is part of the Northern Boreal Mountains Ecoprovince.

The Boreal Mountains and Plateaus Ecoregion is unique among other British Columbia ecoregions in that it contains several volcanoes of late Tertiary and Pleistocene age. Level Mountain and Mount Edziza are the most prominent volcanoes of this ecoregion which reach elevations of 2,134 m (7,001 ft) and 2,787 m (9,144 ft), respectively. Level Mountain is a large, low-relief shield volcano while Mount Edziza is a complex volcanic cone.

== Ecosections ==
The Boreal Mountains and Plateaus Ecoregion contains seven ecosections; areas within the ecoregion with minor variations in physiography and macroclimate:

- Cassiar Ranges Ecosection
- Finlay River Trench Ecosection
- Kechika Mountains Ecosection
- Kechika River Trench Ecosection
- Northern Omineca Mountains Ecosection
- Southern Boreal Plateau Ecosection
- Stikine Plateau Ecosection
