= Eddontenajon =

Coordinates: 57.813°N 129.959°W

Location of Eddontenajon in British Columbia

Eddontenajon is an unincorporated settlement in the Stikine Country of the northwestern British Columbia Interior in Canada. It is located along the Stewart-Cassiar Highway on the northeast side of Eddontenajon Lake and comprises a small commercial centre as well as the community. It should not be confused with the original Eddontenajon Post Office, now renamed Iskut which is a few miles farther north at the north end of the lake.

The name means "child walking in the water" in the Tahltan language.

== See also ==
- Eddontenajon/Iskut Village Airport (CBU2)
