= Beatty Creek (Tahltan River tributary) =

- Mouth of Beatty Creek

Location
- Country: Canada
- Province: British Columbia
- District: Cassiar Land District

Physical characteristics
- Source: Level Mountain Range
  - location: Level Mountain
  - coordinates: 58°29′9″N 131°25′51″W
  - elevation: 1,808 m (5,932 ft)
- Mouth: Tahltan River
  - coordinates: 58°6′7″N 131°11′25″W
  - elevation: 431 m (1,414 ft)
- Length: 62 km (39 mi)
- Basin size: 438 km^{2} (169 sq mi)
- Discharge
  - average: 5.73 m^{3}/s (202 cu ft/s)

Basin features
- Topo maps: NTS 104J6 Beatty Creek; NTS 104J3 Tahltan River

Beatty Creek is a tributary of the Tahltan River in northwest part of the province of British Columbia, Canada. It flows generally south about 62 km (39 mi) to join the Tahltan River a few kilometres downstream from the Little Tahltan River confluence. The Tahltan River is one of the main tributaries of the Stikine River.

Beatty Creek's watershed covers 438 km^{2} (169 sq mi), and its mean annual discharge is 5.73 m^{3}/s (202 cu ft/s). The mouth of the Beatty Creek is located about 14 km (8.7 mi) north of Telegraph Creek, British Columbia, about 190 km (120 mi) east of Juneau, Alaska, and about 360 km (220 mi) southeast of Whitehorse, Yukon. Beatty Creek's watershed's land cover is classified as 32.3% shrubland, 22.4% conifer forest, 17.8% barren, 15.8% mixed forest, 10.3% herbaceous, and small amounts of other cover.

Beatty Creek is in the traditional territory of the Tahltan people.

== Geography ==
Beatty Creek originates on the slopes of Meszah Peak, the highest peak of the Level Mountain Range, a cluster of bare peaks on the summit of the massive Level Mountain shield volcano, which forms the most voluminous and most persistent eruptive centre in the Northern Cordilleran Volcanic Province. Beatty Creek flows south by Nalachaga Mountain and through a large forested U-shaped valley that was glacially carved into Level Mountain.

Other streams that originate near the source of Beatty Creek include Kakuchuya Creek, Matsatu Creek, Lost Creek, Kaha Creek, Megatushon Creek, and the Little Tuya River, all of which are upper headwater tributaries of the Stikine River and Taku River systems.

As Beatty Creek flows south through Level Mountain and the Nahlin Plateau it collects numerous unnamed tributary streams, some of which also flow through deep valleys carved into Level Mountain. Beatty Creek joins the Tahltan River about 8 km (5.0 mi) downstream from the Little Tahltan River confluence, and about 18 km (11 mi) upstream from the mouth of the Tahltan River where it joins the Stikine River.

== Ecology ==
Beatty Creek supports runs of Chinook salmon and other salmonids.

== See also ==
- List of rivers of British Columbia
