= Tuya River =

- Mouth of Tuya River

Location
- Country: Canada
- Province: British Columbia
- District: Cassiar Land District

Physical characteristics
- Source: High Tuya Lake
  - location: Tuya Range
  - coordinates: 59°13′42″N 130°31′25″W
  - elevation: 1,480 m (4,860 ft)
- Mouth: Stikine River
  - coordinates: 58°2′25″N 130°51′4″W
  - elevation: 236 m (774 ft)
- Length: 200 km (120 mi)
- Basin size: 3,575 km^{2} (1,380 sq mi),
- Discharge
  - average: 36.9 m^{3}/s (1,300 cu ft/s)

Basin features
- Topo maps: NTS 104J Dease Lake; NTS 104O Jennings River

The Tuya River is a major tributary of the Stikine River in northwest part of the province of British Columbia, Canada. From its source at High Tuya Lake in Tuya Mountains Provincial Park just south of Ash Mountain, the highest peak of the Tuya Range, the Tuya River flows south about 200 km (120 mi) to meet the Stikine River in the Grand Canyon of the Stikine. The Tuya River's main tributary is the Little Tuya River. The Tuya River divides the Tanzilla Plateau on the east from the Kawdy Plateau, to the northwest, and the Nahlin Plateau, to the southwest. All three are considered sub-plateaus of the Stikine Plateau. The Tuya River's watershed covers 3,575 km^{2} (1,380 sq mi), and its mean annual discharge is estimated at 36.9 m^{3}/s (1,300 cu ft/s). The mouth of the Tuya River is located about 24 km (15 mi) northeast of Telegraph Creek, British Columbia, about 67 km (42 mi) southwest of Dease Lake, British Columbia, and about 210 km (130 mi) east of Juneau, Alaska. The Tuya River's watershed's land cover is classified as 35.7% shrubland, 31.4% conifer forest, 14.0% mixed forest, 7.2% herbaceous, and small amounts of other cover.

A tuya is a geologic term for a flat-topped, steep-sided volcano formed when lava erupts through a thick glacier or ice sheet. The geologic term comes from Tuya Butte, which was named in association with Tuya Lake. The term may come from the Tahltan language.

The Tuya River is in the traditional territory of the Tahltan First Nation, of the Tahltan people, the Kaska Dena First Nation, and the Teslin Tlingit First Nation.

== Geography ==
The Tuya River originates at High Tuya Lake in Tuya Mountains Provincial Park, just south of Ash Mountain, the highest peak of the Tuya Range. It flows south to Tuya Lake, southeast of Tuya Butte and east of Mount Josephine. The tributary Butte Creek, flowing south from Butte Lake in Tuya Mountains Provincial Park, empties into Tuya Lake. From the southern end of Tuya Lake the Tuya River continues south. It is joined by Josephine Creek and numerous unnamed tributaries.

Continuing south the Tuya River flows east of Tachilta Lakes, collecting more tributaries including Cody Creek, Tachilta Creek, Mckessock Creek, and Ross Creek. A few kilometres west of Cariboo Meadows the Tuya River is joined by its main tributary, the Little Tuya River. As the river nears the Stikine River it is joined by Classy Creek, then flows under Telegraph Creek Road. The Tuya River empties into the Stikine River near Days Ranch, the mouth of the Klastline River, and the Tahltan Indian reserve of "Tahltan 10", of the Tahltan First Nation,

== Geology ==
Coal has been found in rocks exposed in the drainage of the Tuya River and its tributaries the Little Tuya River and Mansfield Creek, between the communities of Dease Lake and Telegraph Creek in northwestern BC. This coal field is called the Tuya River Coal Basin. The coal was first discovered in 1904, but the main exploration of its economic potential occurred in the late 1970s to 1990s by PetroCanada.

== Natural history ==
The Tuya River drainage provides very high quality salmon spawning habitat, but fish passage is blocked by several barriers including an 11 m (36 ft) waterfall located about 3 km (1.9 mi) above the mouth of the Tuya and another significant barrier about 51 km (32 mi) upriver. In addition, a 2006 landslide created a barrier to fish passage near the mouth of the Tuya River. Chinook salmon spawn in the lowermost portion of the river, below the blockage.

In the 1950s the Alaska Department of Fish and Game assessed the Tuya River as having the highest level of potential salmon spawning habitat of any transboundary river, possibly capable of supporting more sockeye salmon than the entire Stikine River.

The Pacific Salmon Commission, a joint US-Canada transboundary river salmon protection regulatory body, has made the Tuya River a major component of its efforts to improve fish stocks in the Stikine River watershed.

In 2008 explosives were used to blast through the fish barrier created by the 2006 landslide. Field studies in 2009 indicated that the landslide barrier had been successfully breached. Salmonid species found in the Tuya River in 2009 included Chinook salmon, sockeye salmon, coho salmon, pink salmon, rainbow trout, and bull trout.

== See also ==
- List of rivers of British Columbia
