= Dease Lake Airport =

- IATA: YDL; ICAO: CYDL

Summary
- Airport type: Public
- Operator: Stikine Airport Society
- Location: Dease Lake, British Columbia
- Time zone: PST (UTC−08:00)
  - Summer (DST): PDT (UTC−07:00)
- Elevation AMSL: 2,634 ft (803 m)
- Coordinates: 58°25′20″N 130°01′53″W

Map
- Location in British Columbia

Runways
| Direction | Length | | Surface |
| Direction | ft | m | Surface |
|---|---|---|---|
| 02/20 | 6,003 | 1,830 | Asphalt |
- Source: Canada Flight Supplement

Dease Lake Airport (IATA: YDL, ICAO: CYDL) is located 1.5 nautical miles (2.8 km; 1.7 mi) south of Dease Lake, British Columbia, Canada.

== Airlines and destinations ==
| Airlines | Destinations |
|---|---|
| Central Mountain Air | Charter: Prince George, Smithers, Terrace |
