= King Salmon Fault =

Geologic fault in British Columbia, Canada

The King Salmon Fault is a northwest-trending thrust fault in the Northern Interior of British Columbia, Canada. It takes its name from King Salmon Lake which lies at the headwaters of King Salmon Creek.
