= Hatin Lake =

Natural lake in British Columbia, Canada

- Location within British Columbia
- Location: British Columbia, Canada
- Coordinates: 58°38′57″N 131°43′20″W
- Primary inflows: Koshin River
- Primary outflows: Koshin River
- Basin countries: Canada

Hatin Lake is a small low-lying lake on the Nahlin Plateau in Cassiar Land District of the Northern Interior of British Columbia, Canada. It is an expansion of the Koshin River, which flows north from nearby Level Mountain into the Nahlin River. The Callison Ranch lies on the eastern side of Hatin Lake.

Hatin Lake is one of three lakes most commonly used to gain access to the Level Mountain shield volcano by float plane, the other two being Granite Lake and Ketchum Lake.

== See also ==
- List of lakes of British Columbia
