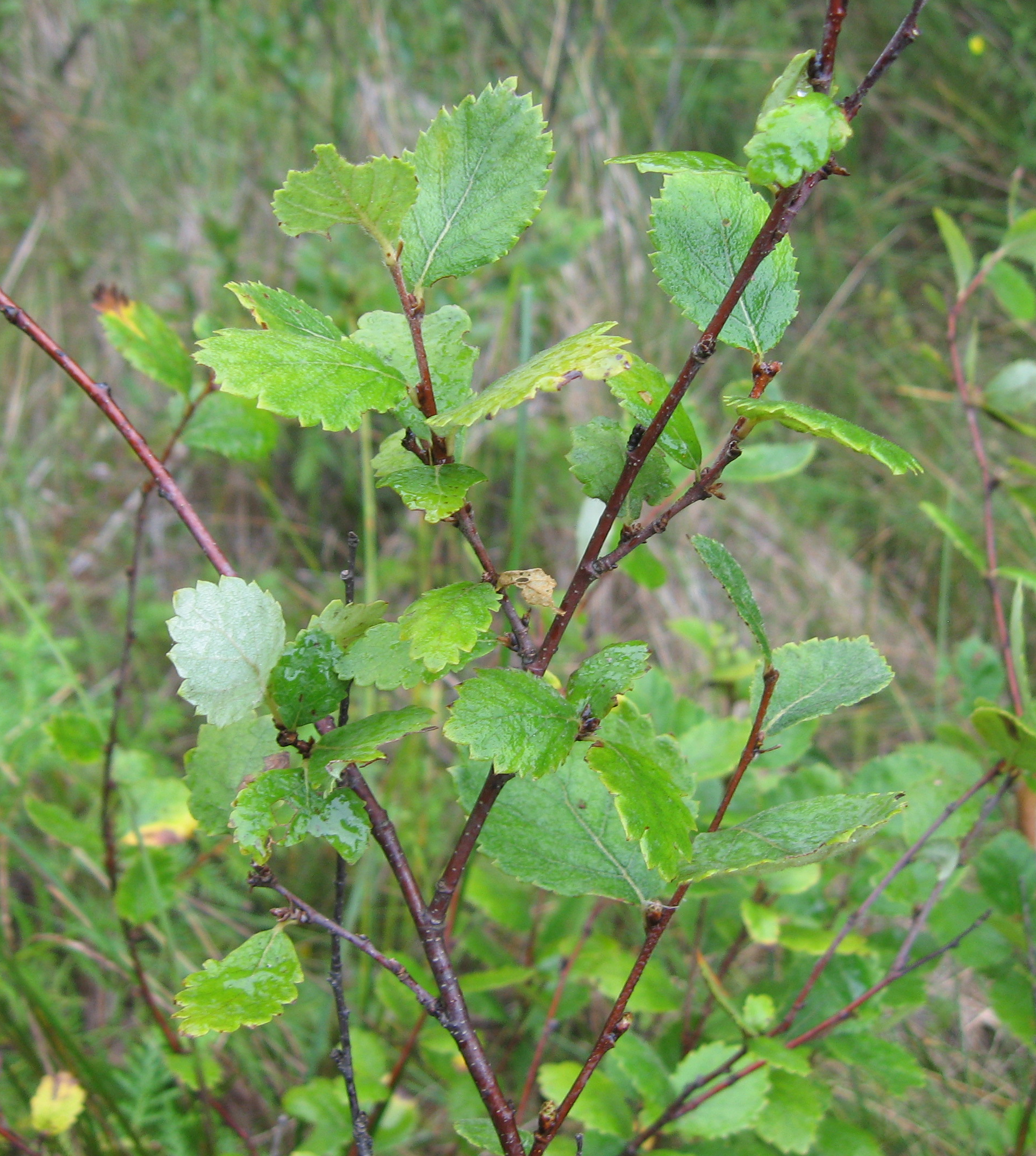

Conservation status
- Least Concern (IUCN 3.1)

- Secure (NatureServe)

Scientific classification
- Kingdom: Plantae
- Clade: Embryophytes
- Clade: Tracheophytes
- Clade: Angiosperms
- Clade: Eudicots
- Clade: Rosids
- Order: Fagales
- Family: Betulaceae
- Genus: Betula
- Subgenus: Betula subg. Chamaebetula
- Species: B. pumila

Binomial name
- Betula pumila L.

= Betula pumila =

Species of birch

Betula pumila (dwarf birch or bog birch) is a deciduous shrub native to North America. Bog birch occurs over a vast area of northern North America, from Yukon in the west to New England in the east and all the way to Washington and Oregon, inhabiting swamps and riparian zones in the boreal forests.

== Description ==
It reaches 1–4 m (3–13 ft) in height. Like other birches, it is monoecious and its reproductive structures are catkins. Leaves are alternate but close together, especially on slow growing individuals. Leaves are coarsely dentate and rounded at the base.
