= Tahltan, British Columbia =

Tahltan
- Location of Tahltan in British Columbia
- Coordinates: 58°01′00″N 131°00′00″W
- Country: Canada
- Province: British Columbia
- Area codes: 250, 778

Tahltan, or Goon-da-chagga or Goon-tdar-shaga ("where the spring water stops" in the Tahltan language,) is an unincorporated locality and Indian reserve community of the Tahltan people located east of Telegraph Creek in northern British Columbia, Canada, near the confluence of the Stikine and Tahltan Rivers. The local First Nations government is the Tahltan Band Council. The specific name of the Indian Reserve is Tahltan Indian Reserve No. 1. Other reserves in the immediate vicinity, also governed by this band, are Tahltan Forks Indian Reserve No. 5, Upper Tahltan Indian Reserve No. 4 and Hiusta's Meadow Indian Reserve No. 2.

Tahltan is overlooked by a succession of three flat-lying alkali basalt lava flows of Pleistocene age which may be extensions of the Level Mountain shield volcano. The upper and lower surfaces of the succession contain well-developed columnar joints.

The name of the locality is from the Tlingit language and means "something heavy in the water", referring to salmon. It was extended from this locality's name to apply to the Tahltan people.

== See also ==
- Iskut, British Columbia
- Eddontenajon, British Columbia
- Tahltan Indian Reserve No. 10
