= Heart Peaks =

Massif in British Columbia, Canada

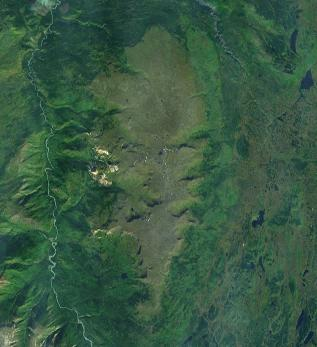
- Satellite photo of Heart Peaks (middle)

Highest point
- Elevation: 2,012 m (6,601 ft)
- Prominence: 1,012 m (3,320 ft)
- Coordinates: 58°35′56″N 131°57′48″W

Geography
- Location within British Columbia
- Location: British Columbia, Canada
- Parent range: Nahlin Plateau
- Topo map: NTS 104J12 Dudidontu River

Geology
- Rock age: Neogene-to-Quaternary
- Mountain type: Shield volcano
- Volcanic zone: Northern Cordilleran Volcanic Province
- Last eruption: Unknown

Heart Peaks, originally known as the Heart Mountains, is a mountain massif in the Northern Interior of British Columbia, Canada. It is 90 km (56 mi) northwest of the small community of Telegraph Creek and just southwest of Callison Ranch. With a maximum elevation of 2,012 m (6,601 ft), it rises above the surrounding landscape on the Nahlin Plateau, which is part of the western Stikine Plateau. Heart Peaks has been an area of prospecting since the 1980s with the discovery of precious metals.

Situated in a large area of volcanic activity, Heart Peaks consists of a large shield volcano. It was formed in the past 23 million years by repeated eruptions of lava and rock. However, present day eruptions have not been observed. A number of related volcanoes are adjacent to Heart Peaks and form an extensive volcanic zone over 1,000 km (620 mi) long. The knowledge of Heart Peaks is limited, especially its eruptive history.

== Geology and geography ==
=== Setting ===
Heart Peaks is part of the Northern Cordilleran Volcanic Province, a long volcanic chain extending from just north of the city of Prince Rupert in British Columbia through Yukon to the Alaska border. Along this line, the North American Plate has been rupturing. Earth's lithosphere consists of several large tectonic plates, which slowly move towards and away from one another, either converging and subducting or diverging and rifting; volcanoes and earthquakes are generated by these activities. The west coast of North America is the site of plate margins between the large Pacific and North American plates, and also between the smaller Juan de Fuca and Cocos plates.

Tectonic activity along the North Coast of British Columbia and Southeast Alaska is characterized by transform movements of the Queen Charlotte Fault, a plate boundary where the Pacific Plate skids by the North American Plate. As the Pacific Plate moves northward to the Aleutian subduction zone, it generates rifting in the North American continent. Magma rises along cracks created by the rifting, and eventually erupts on the surface to form a volcano. This geological process has, over time, created the Northern Cordilleran Volcanic Province, which is the most volcanically active area in Canada. However, most of the volcanoes have not been directly dated or have not been dated in sufficient detail to recognize how active they are, making the prediction of volcanic events difficult and volcanic hazards uncertain.

=== Structure ===
The nearly oval-shaped Heart Peaks shield volcano is made of basalt and trachybasalt with a composite thickness up to 430 m (1,410 ft); pyroclastic rocks are also present. It lies just west of the much larger Level Mountain shield and southwest of the Kawdy volcanoes. A series of steep-sided lava domes composed of porphyritic rhyolite and minor trachyte are situated on the western flank of Heart Peaks and display colours such as light green and pink. Rhyolitic lava domes are also present on its summit. The shield is surrounded by tributaries of the Inklin River, which flows northwest into the Taku River.

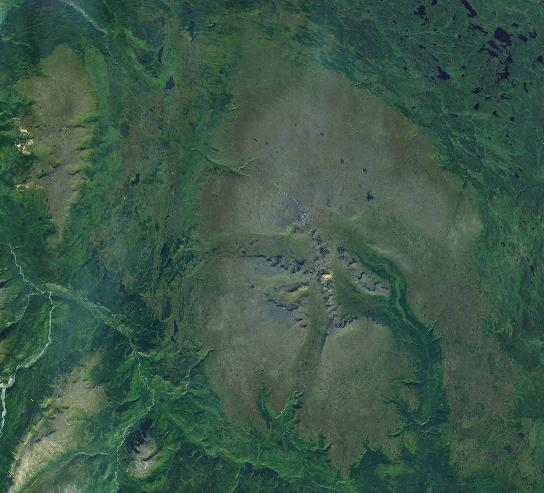
A satellite photo of Heart Peaks (upper-left corner) and nearby Level Mountain (middle). This image clearly shows the large contrast in size between the two volcanoes.

Heart Peaks is at least 33 km (21 mi) long and no more than 19 km (12 mi) wide at its base. The west and east flanks of the volcano are dissected, giving it a rugged appearance. However, its north flank is rounded and relatively smooth while its south flank is rather pointed. The highest elevation of Heart Peaks is 2,012 m (6,601 ft) at a small peak roughly in the middle of its summit plateau while the regional elevation of the Nahlin Plateau is 1,000 m (3,300 ft). This indicates that Heart Peaks has a topographic prominence of at least 1,012 m (3,320 ft). More than 20 unnamed creeks flow from the volcano, which drain into the nearby Dudidontu and Sheslay rivers.

With an area of about 275 km^{2} (106 mi^{2}) and a volume of less than 160 km^{3} (38 mi^{3}), Heart Peaks is the third-largest volcano in the Northern Cordilleran Volcanic Province, exceeded by the Mount Edziza and Level Mountain shields, which cover more than 1,000 km^{2} (390 mi^{2}). Heart Peaks is over five times larger than the Mount Meager massif in southwestern British Columbia, the largest stratovolcano by volume in the Garibaldi Volcanic Belt.

The area surrounding Heart Peaks is largely undeveloped, with Callison Ranch being the only locality. Vegetation at the volcano is present mainly on its flanks as its broad summit consists of a rocky plateau. Because of its remote location, Heart Peaks is accessed by helicopter from the small communities of Atlin and Dease Lake.

== Eruptive history ==
=== Background ===
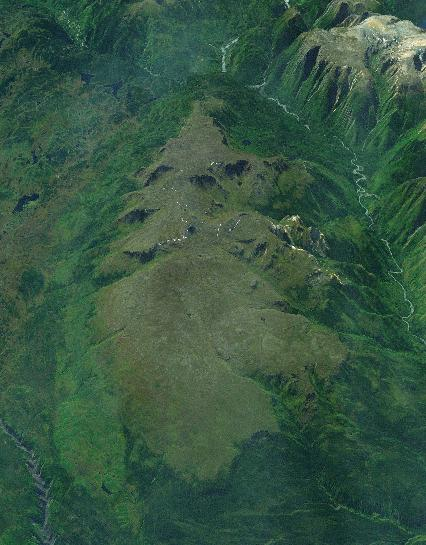
Heart Peaks from the north. The Dudidontu River is in the lower-left corner and the Sheslay River is in the upper-right corner along the Coast Mountains.

Little is known about the eruptive history of Heart Peaks because it has not been studied in detail by scientists. The exact age of Heart Peaks is not known, but its first volcanic phase occurred during the Neogene period (between 23 and 2.5 million years ago). The variety of volcanic deposits at Heart Peaks indicates that it has a history of producing not only fluid and passive basaltic lava flows, but also more silica-rich trachyte and rhyolitic lavas and explosive eruptions. Phreatic breccias are found at the volcano, providing evidence that phreatic eruptions have occurred at least once throughout its eruptive history. Features created by subglacial eruptions are also present. The latest volcanic phase at Heart Peaks is largely Pleistocene (between 2.5 million and 10,000 years ago) in age and late-stage Holocene (10,000 years ago to present) activity is uncertain. This is partly because it is unknown whether Holocene volcanic rocks exist at the volcano. Nevertheless, the last eruption at Heart Peaks is unknown.

=== Finlay tephras ===
Heart Peaks is one of the four volcanoes in the Northern Cordilleran Volcanic Province suggested to have erupted the Finlay tephras. These are situated throughout northwestern British Columbia and likely extend east into the Canadian Rockies. In the Finlay River and Dease Lake areas, two tephra deposits are situated between sand, silt, mud and gravel. They are both phonolitic to trachytic in composition and high in iron(II) oxide, indicating that the tephras were possibly erupted from a single volcano. Regional plant macrofossils immediately overlying the youngest Finlay tephra deposit are 8960 ± 80 and 9180 ± 80 radiocarbon years old. This indicates that the Finlay tephras are Early Holocene in age and were deposited shortly after the regional Fraser Glaciation retreated.

The Finlay tephras are largely composed of elements most similar to those of Hoodoo Mountain, a flat-topped volcano that formed subglacially at least 100,000 years ago. Two phonolitic lava flows on its south flank were erupted between 10,000 and 9,000 years ago and remain unglaciated. They have a similar chemistry to the glass composition of the Finlay tephras. However, no tephras or pyroclastic rocks have been found at Hoodoo Mountain that were erupted the same time as these lava flows. Therefore, other possible sources have been proposed. At the Mount Edziza volcanic complex, basalts of probable Late Pleistocene to Early Holocene age have been found, but their exact ages and chemical compositions are not well known. Because Heart Peaks and nearby Level Mountain have been poorly studied and it is unknown if they contain Holocene age volcanic rocks, they are also possible sources for the Finlay tephras.

== Human history ==
=== Naming ===
The name Heart Mountains was adopted in the BC Gazetteer of 1930 with coordinates placing the massif at 58°38′N 131°57′W. Subsequently, it was renamed to Heart Peaks on May 6, 1947 and coordinates improved to 58°36′N 132°00′W. The name origins are unknown as they have not been recorded. A number of other mountain features in British Columbia also had their name changed in 1947, such as the Rainbow Range, which was originally named Rainbow Mountains. The name Heart Peaks officially refers to two small peaks situated on top of the shield volcano, located at 58°35′56″N 131°57′48″W. Because the shield volcano consists of a single landmass and the name Heart Peaks was officially given for two peaks on its summit, it is sometimes known as Heart Peak to avoid confusion. Heart Peaks is also known as HP in scientific documents and on geological maps.

=== Mineral explorations ===
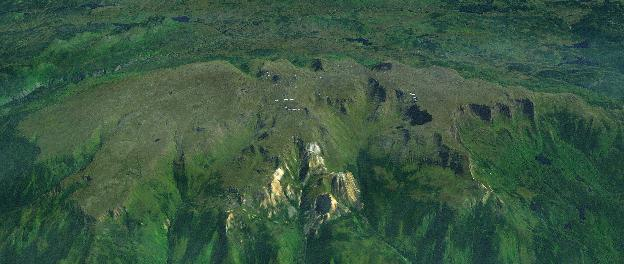
Heart Peaks seen from the west. Mineral explorations have occurred at the circular feature at the bottom centre of this image.

The western flank of Heart Peaks has been an area of mineral exploration since 1980. A series of gold-bearing quartz veins were discovered in 1980 within a zone of argillic alteration covering an area of more than 3 km^{2} (1.2 mi^{2}). In 1982, a number of geochemical soil surveys were carried out, as well as insufficient hand trenching and scree and rock sampling. In 1983, very low frequency electromagnetic surveys completed 49 km (30 mi) of surveying in the area. Exploration diamond drilling in 1984 resulted in the creation of eight widely spaced drill holes while an undocumented diamond drill program created two holes in 1987. Explorations did not resume until 1996 when the United States Diamond Corporation carried out heavy mineral silt sampling and a test induced polarization survey; two diamond drill holes were also created. All of these mineral explorations took place in the Heart Peaks property, which covers an area of 2,867 ha (7,080 acres). It consists of seven mineral claims entirely owned by Colorado Resources Ltd. A north trending graben structure 5 km (3.1 mi) long and 3 km (1.9 mi) wide intersects the property.

=== Monitoring ===
Like other volcanoes in the Northern Cordilleran Volcanic Province, Heart Peaks is not monitored closely enough by the Geological Survey of Canada to ascertain how active its magma system is. This is partly because it is located in a remote region and no major eruptions have taken place in Canada in the past few hundred years. As a result, volcano monitoring is less important than dealing with other natural processes, including tsunamis, earthquakes and landslides. No recent earthquakes are known to have occurred at Heart Peaks. If it were to erupt there would likely be weeks, months or years of warning signs, such as clusters of minor earthquakes that would likely originate less than 15 km (9.3 mi) below the surface. They are generally too small to be felt by people, but the existing network of seismographs has been established to monitor tectonic earthquakes. However, the seismograph network is too far away to provide a good indication of what is happening under the mountain. It may sense an increase in seismic activity if the volcano becomes very restless, but this may only provide a warning for a significant eruption. It might detect activity only once the volcano has started erupting.

== See also ==
- List of Northern Cordilleran volcanoes
- List of volcanoes in Canada
- Volcanology of Western Canada
