= Nahlin Fault =

The Nahlin Fault is a northeast-dipping thrust fault in the Northern Interior of British Columbia, Canada. It forms a western boundary of the Cache Creek terrane.
