= Tahltan River =

Tributary river in the country of Canada

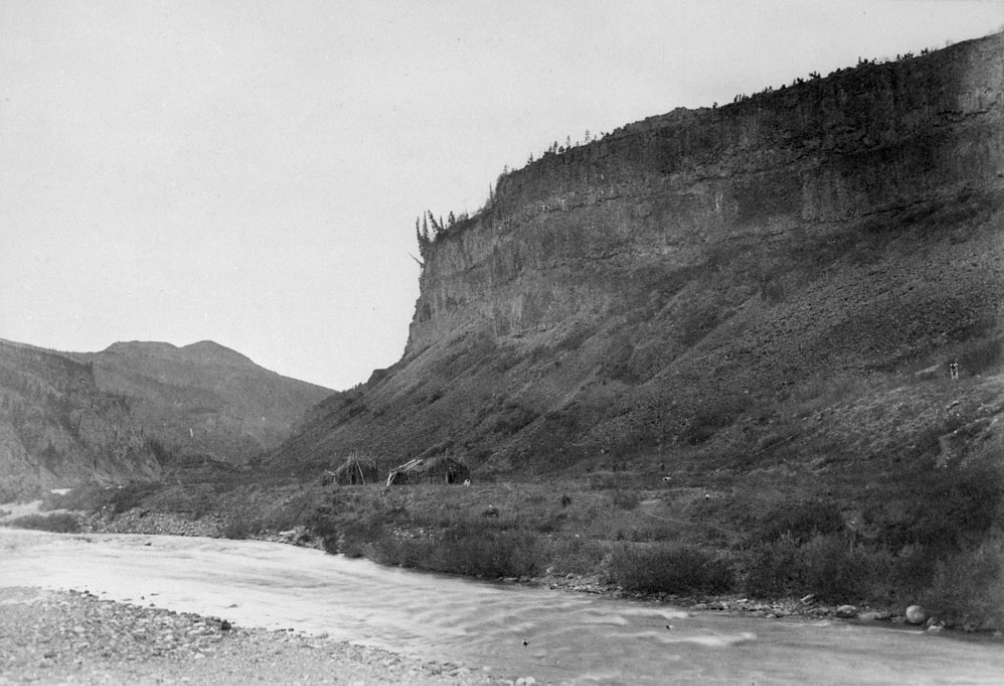
- Mouth of the Tahltan River in 1887

- Mouth of Tahltan River

Location
- Country: Canada
- Province: British Columbia
- District: Cassiar Land District

Physical characteristics
- Source: Tahltan Highland
  - coordinates: 58°2′39″N 131°55′52″W
  - elevation: 2,197 m (7,208 ft)
- Mouth: Stikine River
  - location: Near Telegraph Creek
  - coordinates: 58°0′35″N 130°58′51″W
  - elevation: 243 m (797 ft)
- Length: 95 km (59 mi)
- Basin size: 1,851 km^{2} (715 sq mi),
- Discharge
  - average: 21.5 m^{3}/s (760 cu ft/s)

The Tahltan River is a tributary of the Stikine River in northwest part of the province of British Columbia, Canada. It flows generally east and southeast about 95 km (59 mi) to join the Stikine River at Tahltan, British Columbia. The lower Tahltan River marks the boundary between the Tahltan Highland and the Nahlin Plateau, both of which are part of the larger Stikine Plateau region.

The Tahltan River's watershed covers 1,851 km^{2} (715 sq mi), and its mean annual discharge is 21.5 m^{3}/s (760 cu ft/s). The mouth of the Tahltan River is located about 15 km (9.3 mi) northeast of Telegraph Creek, British Columbia, about 200 km (120 mi) east of Juneau, Alaska, and about 375 km (233 mi) southeast of Whitehorse, Yukon. The Tahltan River's watershed's land cover is classified as 35.0% conifer forest, 29.6% shrubland, 14.0% barren, 9.1% herbaceous, 8.5% mixed forest, and small amounts of other cover.

The Tahltan River is named for the Tahltan people and is in their traditional territory.

== Geography ==
The Tahltan River originates in high glaciated peaks on the east edge of the Boundary Ranges and the west edge of the Tahltan Highland. It first flows south and southeast then east and northeast, gathering many unnamed tributary streams. After passing north of Tahltan Lake it is joined by Johnny Tashoots Creeks, which flows from Tahltan Lake. The Tahltan River is then joined by Harper Reed Creek and Lovell Creek, both flowing from the north, then Tutesheta Creek, flowing from the south. After flowing north briefly the Tahltan River is joined by its main tributary, the Little Tahltan River near the Indian reserve of Tahltan Forks 5, of the Tahltan First Nation.

Turning east and southeast, the Tahltan River is joined by numerous tributaries including Bear Creek, Beatty Creek, Newell Creek, Middle Creek, and Hartz Creek. In its last few kilometres the Tahltan River flows south to join the Stikine River in the Grand Canyon of the Stikine, at the locality of Tahltan and the Tahltan Indian Reserve Tahltan 1.

== History ==
The historic Yukon Telegraph Trail runs through the Tahltan River's watershed, following the Tutesheta Creek tributary and crossing the Tahltan River near the Little Tahltan River confluence.

== Ecology ==
The Tahltan River is a major contributor to the Stikine River's salmon runs and the most significant contributor of Chinook salmon, sockeye salmon, and other salmonids like steelhead trout. Spawning habitat is found throughout the Tahltan's watershed. Decheeka Falls, located about 3 km (1.9 mi) upstream of the Little Tahltan confluence, sometimes acts as a barrier to fish migration.

In 2014 a large rock slide partially filled in the Tahltan River about 1.1 km (0.68 mi) above the Stikine River confluence. This slide created a partial barrier to salmon migration. In 2018 large scale remediation efforts were completed, widening the river's channel and distributing rock debris downstream. This has improved fish migration although the slide debris may still be a significant barrier under certain flow conditions.

== See also ==
- List of rivers of British Columbia
