= Ecosection =

An ecosection is a biogeographic unit smaller than an ecoregion that contains minor physiographic, macroclimatic or oceanographic variations. They are a virtual ecological zone in the Canadian province of British Columbia, which contains 139 ecosections that vary from pure terrestrial units to pure marine units.

== See also ==
- Bioregion
- Ecological classification
