= Tahltan Indian Reserve No. 10 =

Coordinates: 58°04′00″N 130°47′00″W

Tahltan Indian Reserve No. 10, referred to by Statistics Canada for census purposes as Tahtlan 10, is an Indian reserve of the Tahltan First Nation. It is located one mile north of the confluence of the Klastline River with the Stikine in the Stikine Country of the northwestern British Columbia Interior of Canada.

== See also ==
- Tahltan, British Columbia (Tahltan IR No. 1)
- List of Indian reserves in British Columbia
