= Granite Lake (Kawdy Plateau) =

Lake in British Columbia, Canada

- Location within British Columbia
- Location: British Columbia
- Coordinates: 58°41′52″N 131°07′21″W
- Basin countries: Canada

Granite Lake is a lake on the Kawdy Plateau of the Northern Interior of British Columbia, Canada. It is located northwest of the junction of the Nahlin and Tuya rivers in Cassiar Land District.

A roughly equidimensional granodiorite pluton outcrops adjacent to Granite Lake. This intrusion, called the Granite Lake Pluton, is of Middle to Late Jurassic age and is about 50 km^{2} (19 mi^{2}) in area.

Granite Lake is one of three lakes most commonly used to gain access to the Level Mountain shield volcano by float plane, the other two being Hatin Lake and Ketchum Lake.

== See also ==
- List of lakes of British Columbia
