= Little Tahltan River =

Stream in the country of Canada

Coordinates: 58°07′14″N 131°19′12″W

The Little Tahltan River is a stream in the Northern Interior of British Columbia, Canada. It drains a significant section of the southwest quadrant of Level Mountain, from which it flows 40 km (25 mi) southeast into the Tahltan River. The Little Tahltan River watershed covers an area of approximately 214 km^{2} (83 sq mi).
