= Tahltan language =

Endangered Athabaskan language of Canada

Tahltan
- Tałtan ẕāke, dah dẕāhge, didene keh
- Native to: Canada
- Region: Northern British Columbia
- Ethnicity: 2,460 Tahltan people (2014, FPCC)
- Native speakers: 180 (2021 census)
- Language family: Na-Dené: Athabaskan; Northern Athabaskan; Central Cordillera; Tahltan

Language codes
- ISO 639-3: tht
- Glottolog: tahl1239
- ELP: Tāłtān (Tahltan)
- Tahltan is classified as Critically Endangered by the UNESCO Atlas of the World's Languages in Danger.

Tahltan, Tāłtān, also called Tałtan ẕāke ("Tahltan people language"), dah dẕāhge ("our language") or didene keh ("this people's way") is a poorly documented and endangered Northern Athabaskan language spoken by 235 of the Tahltan people (also "Nahanni") who live in northern British Columbia around Telegraph Creek, Dease Lake, and Iskut. Tahltan is a critically endangered language. Several linguists classify Tahltan as a dialect of the same language as Tagish and Kaska (Krauss and Golla 1981, Mithun 1999).

== Language revitalization ==
As of May 2013, language researcher Dr. Judy Thompson estimated that there are 30 Tahltan speakers. A new Language and Culture office is exploring evening "language immersion" classes, a Mentor-Apprentice program, and creating a "language nest" for teaching the language to young children. Scholarships are planned for part-time language learners.

As of May 2014, the Dzimēs Chō T’oh/Iskut Language Nest has opened to teach children the language, and two more have been opened since. The Mentor-Apprentice program has also begun, through the First Peoples' Cultural Council.

Lacking written documentation, it was unclear to the language revitalization coordinator how to teach the language, and how to explain the grammar. "After a year of study, Oscar Dennis says he, along with Reginald and Ryan Dennis, have finally cracked the code on Tahltan language's fundamental patterns." As a Dene language, like Navajo, Tahltan has "encoded" patterns in which small pieces are added to words to create meaning. "Dr. Gregory Anderson from the Living Tongues Institute visited our territory, and was so impressed with the team's work that he said he 'couldn't improve upon it.'"

A digital archive of Tahltan recordings, located "at the Tahltan Language Revitalization Offices in Dease Lake, Iskut and Telegraph Creek" can be used on iPods. An English-Tahltan dictionary is also available through their website.

== Phonology ==
=== Consonants ===
There are 47 consonant phonemes:

		Labial	Dental/Alveolar				Palatal (-alveolar)	Velar		Uvular (Note: For many present-day speakers the uvular consonants have merged with the corresponding velars, and velar and uvular articulations are now essentially in free variation; uvular pronunciations are more characteristic of older speakers, and the Tahltan uvulars may themselves derive from contact with Tlingit.)	Glottal
		Labial	plain	inter. (Note: The interdental series ⟨s̱, ts̱, ts̱’, ẕ, dẕ⟩ is articulated at a place between the alveolar sibilants and interdental fricatives of English. Listeners accustomed to English may therefore perceive the voiceless sounds sometimes as closer to [s] and at other times as closer to the [θ] of thin, and likewise the voiced sounds as closer to [z] or to the [ð] of then; speakers also vary between more sibilant-like and more interdental-like realizations, so that a word such as ẕas 'snow' may be heard with two perceptibly different pronunciations. Alderete & Blenkiron (2014) suggest that the interdentals (now non-sibilants) arose from what were once dental/alveolar sibilants, and the dental/alveolar sibilants from what were once postalveolar sibilants ("shibilants").)	sibilant	lateral	Palatal (-alveolar)	plain	labial	Uvular	Glottal
Nasal	plain	m ⟨m⟩	n ⟨n⟩								
Nasal	voiceless		n̥ (Note: A distinct glottalized [n̥ˀ] phoneme might also exist: Alderete & Blenkiron (2014) include it among their phonetic symbols but not in their phoneme chart, but the same inventory in Alderete's companion presentation lists it alongside the other nasals.) ⟨nh⟩								
Nasal	glottalized		nˀ								
Plosive/ Affricate	unaspirated	b (Note: Alderete & Blenkiron (2014) note that ⟨b⟩ is phonetically more like a true voiced stop than ⟨d, g⟩ are, and likewise patterns differently. Bob (1999) suggests that the non-labial stops use a different laryngeal mechanism than voicing for contrast, as is typical for many Athabaskan languages.) ⟨b⟩	t ⟨d⟩	tθ ⟨dẕ⟩	ts ⟨dz⟩	tɬ ⟨dl⟩	tʃ ⟨j⟩	k ⟨g⟩	kʷ ⟨gw⟩	q	ʔ ⟨’⟩
Plosive/ Affricate	aspirated		tʰ ⟨t⟩	tθʰ ⟨ts̱⟩	tsʰ ⟨ts⟩	tɬʰ ⟨tl⟩	tʃʰ ⟨ch⟩	kʰ ⟨k⟩	kʷʰ ⟨kw⟩	qʰ	ʔ ⟨’⟩
Plosive/ Affricate	ejective		tʼ ⟨t’⟩	tθʼ ⟨ts̱’⟩	tsʼ ⟨ts’⟩	tɬʼ ⟨tl’⟩	tʃʼ ⟨ch’⟩	kʼ ⟨k’⟩	kʷʼ ⟨k’w⟩	qʼ	ʔ ⟨’⟩
Fricative	voiceless			θ ⟨s̱⟩	s ⟨s⟩	ɬ ⟨ł⟩	(ʃ) (Note: The postalveolar fricatives /ʃ, ʒ/ are very limited in use and may not be phonemes.) ⟨sh⟩	x ⟨kh⟩	xʷ ⟨khw⟩	χ ⟨yh⟩	h ⟨h⟩
Fricative	voiced			ð ⟨ẕ⟩	z ⟨z⟩	l (Note: The voiced alveolar lateral /l/ is phonetically more approximant-like [l], though it patterns with the fricative /ɬ/ in voicing alternations.) ⟨l⟩	(ʒ)	ɣ ⟨gh⟩	ɣʷ ⟨ghw⟩	ʁ	
Approximant						l ⟨l⟩	j (Note: Nater (1989) additionally posits a voiceless counterpart of /j/ (that is, [ȷ̊]), transcribed ⟨yh⟩, separate from /χ/. It is not included in the inventory of Alderete & Blenkiron (2014), who use ⟨yh⟩ for /χ/; however, they do note that like /l/, /j/ is phonetically more approximant-like, but patterns as a fricative in voicing alternations.) ⟨y⟩		w ⟨w⟩		

=== Vowels ===
There are 9 vowels:

	Front	Central	Back
Close	i ⟨ī⟩		u ⟨ū⟩
Near-close	ɪ ⟨i⟩		ʊ ⟨u⟩
Mid	ɛ ⟨ē⟩	ə ⟨e⟩	o ⟨o, ō⟩
Near-open		ʌ ⟨a⟩	
Open			ɑ ⟨ā⟩

=== Phonological processes ===
- Vowel flattening
- Consonant harmony
- Vowel nasalization
- Vowel laxing
