= Meszah Peak =

Mountain in British Columbia, Canada

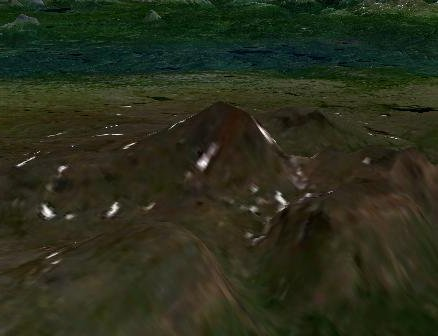

Highest point
- Elevation: 2,164 m (7,100 ft)
- Prominence: 1,101 m (3,612 ft)
- Coordinates: 58°28′43.0″N 131°26′13.9″W

Geography
- Location within British Columbia
- Location: British Columbia, Canada
- District: Cassiar Land District
- Parent range: Level Mountain Range, Nahlin Plateau (western Stikine Plateau)
- Topo map: NTS 104J6 Beatty Creek

Geology
- Mountain type: Volcanic cone
- Volcanic zone: Northern Cordilleran Volcanic Province
- Last eruption: Pleistocene

Meszah Peak is a volcanic cone located 66 km (41 mi) north of Telegraph Creek and 136 km (85 mi) southwest of Zus Mountain in British Columbia, Canada. It is the highest peak of the Level Mountain Range, a cluster of bare peaks on the summit of the massive Level Mountain shield volcano, which forms the most voluminous and most persistent eruptive centre in the Northern Cordilleran Volcanic Province.

== See also ==
- List of volcanoes in Canada
- List of Northern Cordilleran volcanoes
- Volcanology of Western Canada
- Geography of British Columbia
- Geology of the Pacific Northwest
- Heart Peaks
- Atsutla Range
