= Tahltan First Nation =

Band government of the Tahltan people in British Columbia, Canada

Tahltan First Nation, also known as the Tahltan Indian Band, is a band government of the Tahltan people. The main community and reserves are located at Telegraph Creek, British Columbia. Their language is the Tahltan language, which is an Athabaskan language also known as Nahanni, closely related to Kaska and Dunneza. Their Indian and Northern Affairs Canada band number is 682. The Tahltan First Nation is joined with the Iskut First Nation in a combined tribal council-type organization known as the Tahltan Nation.

== Population ==
Registered band population is 1,668.

== Indian Reserves ==
Indian Reserves under the administration of the Tahltan First Nation are:

- Classy Creek IR No.8, 1 mile south of Mincho Lake, 5 miles north of the confluence of Classy Creek and the Tuya River, 259 ha. 58°11′00″N 130°48′00″W
- Dease Lake IR No.9, near south end of Dease Lake, opposite the settlement of Dease Lake, 129.50 ha. 58°28′00″N 130°02′00″W
- Guhthe Tah IR No.12, 30.40 ha. 57°54′14″N 131°10′35″W
- Hiusta's Meadow IR No.2, 3 miles north of the confluence of the Tahltan and Stikine Rivers, 16.20 ha.58°03′00″N 130°56′00″W
- Salmon Creek IR No.3, 1 mile west of Hatchau Lake on the Hackett River, 129.50 ha. 58°11′00″N 131°38′00″W
- Tahtlan IR No.1, on the right bank of the Stikine River at the mouth of the Tahltan River. 151.70 ha. 58°01′00″N 130°59′00″W
- Tahtlan IR No.10, 1 mile north of the confluence of the Klastline and Stikine rivers, 259.40 58°04′00″N 130°47′00″W
- Tahltan Forks IR No.5, at the confluence of the Tahltan and Little Tahltan rivers, near Bear Creek, 3 miles east of Saloon Lake, 19.30 ha. 58°07′00″N 131°20′00″W
- Tatcho Creek IR. No.11, on the right bank of the Tanzilla River, at the mouth of Tatsho Creek, 7 miles SW of Dease Lake (settlement, 222.20 ha.
- Telegraph Creek IR No.6, right bank of the Stikine River near the settlement of Telegraph Creek, 24.20 ha. 57°54′00″N 131°10′00″W
- Telegraph Creek IR No.6A, right bank of the Stikine River, adjoins Telegraph Creek IR No.6, 32.30 ha.57°54′00″N 131°10′00″W
- Upper Tahltan IR No.4, on the Little Tahltan River, 2 miles north of Saloon Lake, 64.70 ha. 58°09′00″N 131°22′00″W

== See also ==
- Iskut First Nation
- Liard First Nation
- Dease River First Nation
