= Level Mountain Range =

Mountain range in British Columbia, Canada

- Location within British Columbia

Highest point
- Peak: Meszah Peak
- Elevation: 2,164 m (7,100 ft)
- Coordinates: 58°28′43″N 131°26′14″W

Geography
- Country: Canada
- Province: British Columbia
- District: Cassiar Land District
- Range coordinates: 58°23′26″N 131°24′06″W
- Topo map: NTS 104J6 Beatty Creek

Geology
- Formed by: Stratovolcano, lava domes
- Rock age: Neogene-to-Quaternary

The Level Mountain Range is a small but prominent mountain range occupying the broad summit of Level Mountain in northern British Columbia, Canada. Located between the Tuya River in the east and the Sheslay River in the west, it represents a high point on the Nahlin Plateau. The range is geologically younger than the main mass of Level Mountain, having formed in the last 7.1 million years. An eroded stratovolcano and several lava domes of Miocene-to-Pleistocene age comprise the Level Mountain Range. The highest point is Meszah Peak at the north end of the range with an elevation of 2,164 m (7,100 ft).

== See also ==
- List of volcanoes in Canada
