= Mixed conifer forest =

Mixed conifer forest is a vegetation type dominated by a mixture of broadleaf trees and conifers. It is generally located in mountains, below the upper montane vegetation type.

== Sierra Nevada range ==
In the Sierra Nevada mountain range of the western United States, the mixed conifer forest is found at elevations of 1,200–5,500 feet (370–1,680 m) in the north, 2,000–6,500 feet (610–1,980 m) in central areas, and 2,500–9,000 feet (760–2,740 m) in the south. Characteristic conifers include Ponderosa Pine (Pinus ponderosa), Sugar Pine (Pinus lambertiana), Incense Cedar (Calocedrus decurrens), White Fir (Abies concolor), Douglas Fir (Pseudotsuga menziesii), and Giant Sequoias (Sequoiadendron giganteum) in pockets. Characteristic broadleaved trees include Black Oak (Quercus kelloggii), and understory trees and shrubs, including Canyon Live Oak (Quercus chrysolepis), Dogwood (Cornus spp.), Mountain Misery (Chamaebatia foliolosa), and Manzanitas (Arctostaphylos spp.). Precipitation in areas of this vegetation type is 25–80 inches (640–2,030 mm), much of this falling as snow. Growing season is about seven months, in areas with summer high temperatures of 80–90 °F (27–32 °C), and winter lows of 22–34 °F (−6–1 °C).

== See also ==
- Temperate broadleaf and mixed forest
- Cedar hemlock douglas-fir forest

== See also ==
- USFS Joint Fire Science Program: Defining Mixed Conifer forest — in the Southwestern plateaus and uplands; the Central and Southern Rocky Mountains; the Sierra Nevada; and the Transverse and Peninsular Ranges in Southern California.
- USDA Forest Service: Mixed Conifer Forest
- NPS.gov: Mixed Conifer Forest in Bandelier National Monument — New Mexico.
- Colorado State Forest Service: Mixed Conifer Forest
- Minnesota Department of Natural Resources: Mixed coniferous-deciduous forest
- U.S. Forest Service: Cascade Mixed Forest--Coniferous Forest--Alpine Meadow Province — Pacific Northwest.
- The Forest Foundation: Restoring mixed-conifer forests
- Las Pilitas Native Plant Nursery Database: Info on California mixed evergreen forest
- Plant Communities of Mount Diablo - Mixed Evergreen Forest
