= Dease Lake =

Community in British Columbia

- Unincorporated community
- Location within British Columbia Location within Canada
- Coordinates: 58°26′00″N 130°01′27″W
- Country: Canada
- Province: British Columbia
- Regional district: Kitimat–Stikine

Area
  - Total: 8.49 km^{2} (3.28 sq mi)

Population (2021)
  - Total: 229
  - Density: 27.0/km^{2} (69.9/sq mi)
- Time zone: UTC−07:00 (PT)
- Area code: 250 / 778 / 236
- Highways: Highway 37

Dease Lake /ˈdiːs/ is a small community in the Cassiar Country of the Northern Interior of British Columbia, Canada. It is 230 km south of the Yukon border on Stewart–Cassiar Highway (Highway 37) at the south end of the lake of the same name. Dease Lake is the last major centre before the Alaska Highway while driving northbound, and also the junction to Telegraph Creek and the Grand Canyon of the Stikine. Dease Lake Indian Reserve No. 9 is nearby and is under the governance of the Tahltan First Nation band government.

The town sits astride a drainage divide separating the basins of the Dease River (to the north) from that of the Tanzilla (to the south), a tributary of the Stikine. As this is a division point between drainage to the Pacific Ocean, via the Stikine, and the Arctic Ocean, via the Liard and Mackenzie Rivers, this is part of the Continental Divide.

The town has a school, various stores, a fuel and service station, hotel, and a Northern Lights College access centre. It used to have a restaurant and a pub, but both have closed. On the reservation there is a local candy shop known as Jeans candy shop, run by and elderly lady that has been selling candy and other similar items for years. The town also has two local restaurants, 1 being a burger and fries place known as the Shack, 2 being a Filipino restaurant known as Nimpha’s Asian Food Eatery. Dease Lake also has a local gym at Service BC open Monday-Friday at 5-9, with amenities as various gym equipment, bathrooms and showers, and free wifi. The town sees a large influx of visitors during the summer months from tourists on their way to the Alaska Highway, Yukon, and Alaska. A majority of these tourists are from Canada or the United States. Dease Lake is also a destination for hunting and other wilderness activities, and the local economy benefits from local gold, copper, and jade mining and exploration activities.

== History ==
In 1837 a Hudson's Bay Company post, known as Lake House, was created by Robert Campbell on the shore of Dease Lake about 50 km (31 mi) north of the Stikine River and 150 km (93 mi) south of where the present day Alaska Highway passes. The Lake had been named in 1834 for Chief Factor Peter Warren Dease, and would become a major junction for miners travelling to the gold rush in Cassiar (later an asbestos mine). Although the fort was abandoned soon after, the town based around the fort lived on, and was renamed Dease Lake in 1934 by then-Chief Trader John McLeod.

During the 1960s and 1970s, BC Rail started to build an extension of their line towards Dease Lake, but construction was halted. Grading was completed all the way, and can still be seen from the air at 58°03′N 129°49′W.

== Geography and climate ==
North of Dease Lake is Good Hope Lake (138 km [86 mi]) and the Alaska Highway (235 km [146 mi]). South of Dease Lake is Iskut (65 km [40 mi]), Stewart (398 km [247 mi]), and Kitwanga (489 km [304 mi]).

Dease Lake has a subarctic climate (Köppen Dfc), typical of northern British Columbia. Summers are mild, coupled with chilly nights while winters are severely cold and snowy, with annual snowfall averaging 212.8 cm (83.78 in). Autumn typically begins by early September and lasts into October when winter begins. Winter can last into late March or sometimes early April. Spring usually lasts until late May or early June, after when summer begins. Due to Dease Lake's high elevation, snowfall is possible during any month of the year.

Climate data for Dease Lake (Dease Lake Airport) WMO ID: 71958; coordinates 58°25′42″N 130°00′38″W; elevation: 806.6 m (2,646 ft); 1991–2020 normals, extremes 1944−present
Month	Jan	Feb	Mar	Apr	May	Jun	Jul	Aug	Sep	Oct	Nov	Dec	Year
Record high humidex	7.8	10.2	13.7	21.2	33.6	31.4	33.3	34.5	29.8	20.0	11.7	6.8	34.5
Record high °C (°F)	8.9 (48.0)	11.7 (53.1)	17.9 (64.2)	22.2 (72.0)	35.3 (95.5)	33.9 (93.0)	33.3 (91.9)	32.2 (90.0)	28.9 (84.0)	20.6 (69.1)	14.4 (57.9)	7.9 (46.2)	35.3 (95.5)
Mean daily maximum °C (°F)	−11.2 (11.8)	−5.7 (21.7)	0.2 (32.4)	7.5 (45.5)	14.5 (58.1)	18.1 (64.6)	19.3 (66.7)	18.2 (64.8)	12.9 (55.2)	5.0 (41.0)	−4.4 (24.1)	−10.2 (13.6)	5.3 (41.5)
Daily mean °C (°F)	−15.9 (3.4)	−11.8 (10.8)	−6.7 (19.9)	1.3 (34.3)	7.3 (45.1)	11.4 (52.5)	13.2 (55.8)	12.0 (53.6)	7.4 (45.3)	0.6 (33.1)	−8.5 (16.7)	−14.9 (5.2)	−0.4 (31.3)
Mean daily minimum °C (°F)	−19.7 (−3.5)	−17.1 (1.2)	−13.1 (8.4)	−4.9 (23.2)	0.1 (32.2)	4.5 (40.1)	6.7 (44.1)	5.6 (42.1)	1.8 (35.2)	−3.5 (25.7)	−12.3 (9.9)	−18.1 (−0.6)	−5.8 (21.6)
Record low °C (°F)	−51.2 (−60.2)	−48.3 (−54.9)	−42.8 (−45.0)	−31.7 (−25.1)	−14.2 (6.4)	−5.6 (21.9)	−2.2 (28.0)	−6.1 (21.0)	−15.0 (5.0)	−27.3 (−17.1)	−42.5 (−44.5)	−46.1 (−51.0)	−51.2 (−60.2)
Record low wind chill	−58.2	−56.4	−53.7	−35.6	−12.8	−5.9	−2.8	−4.1	−15.4	−33.0	−51.6	−58.9	−58.9
Average precipitation mm (inches)	34.3 (1.35)	17.1 (0.67)	20.4 (0.80)	12.4 (0.49)	27.8 (1.09)	52.2 (2.06)	60.3 (2.37)	60.1 (2.37)	49.9 (1.96)	31.1 (1.22)	32.4 (1.28)	26.4 (1.04)	424.5 (16.71)
Average rainfall mm (inches)	0.4 (0.02)	0.1 (0.00)	1.0 (0.04)	2.9 (0.11)	29.0 (1.14)	49.9 (1.96)	66.6 (2.62)	59.2 (2.33)	50.5 (1.99)	17.6 (0.69)	2.0 (0.08)	0.9 (0.04)	280.0 (11.02)
Average snowfall cm (inches)	45.0 (17.7)	25.6 (10.1)	26.0 (10.2)	12.5 (4.9)	5.2 (2.0)	0.1 (0.0)	0.0 (0.0)	0.1 (0.0)	2.1 (0.8)	19.3 (7.6)	39.7 (15.6)	37.1 (14.6)	212.8 (83.8)
Average precipitation days (≥ 0.2 mm)	13.1	8.7	11.4	7.0	10.7	15.4	17.4	17.1	16.4	14.9	15.1	12.2	159.5
Average rainy days (≥ 0.2 mm)	0.2	0.2	0.8	2.3	9.8	15.0	17.6	17.2	15.8	8.4	1.1	0.4	88.8
Average snowy days (≥ 0.2 cm)	13.0	9.8	10.2	6.2	3.2	0.2	0.1	0.1	1.2	8.5	13.8	12.4	78.7
Average relative humidity (%) (at 1300 LST)	81	78	66	53	46	49	56	60	63	71	82	82	66
Average dew point °C (°F)	−19.8 (−3.6)	−13.5 (7.7)	−9.1 (15.6)	−4.8 (23.4)	−1.5 (29.3)	3.5 (38.3)	7.0 (44.6)	7.1 (44.8)	3.5 (38.3)	−1.3 (29.7)	−8.8 (16.2)	−16.5 (2.3)	−4.5 (23.9)
Mean monthly sunshine hours	58.2	97.3	142.8	189.5	211.1	220.4	212.5	188.2	117.5	74.1	50.7	38.0	1,600.3
Percentage possible sunshine	26.2	37.2	39.1	43.9	40.6	40.4	39.1	39.4	30.4	23.2	21.4	18.9	33.3
Source: Environment and Climate Change Canada (rain/rain days, snow/snow days, humidex, wind chill 1981–2010) Canadian Climate Normals 1981–2010 (dew point, humidity 1951–1980) Canadian Climate Normals 1951–1980
