= Nahlin Plateau =

Geographic region in British Columbia, Canada

- Plateau
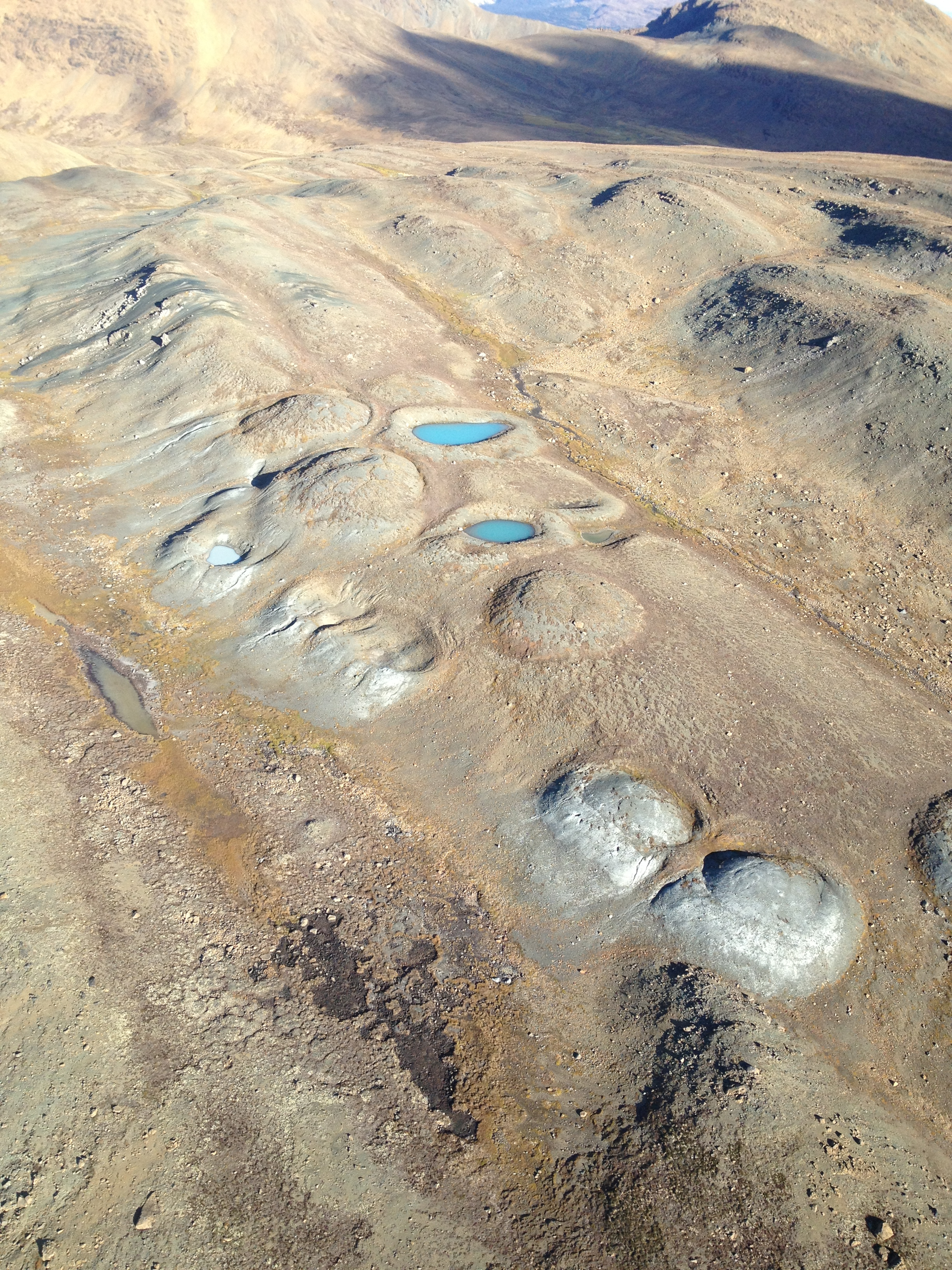
- A series of mud volcanoes on the Nahlin Plateau

- Location within British Columbia
- Coordinates: 58°27′00″N 131°25′00″W
- Location: British Columbia
- Part of: Stikine Plateau

The Nahlin Plateau is a plateau in northwestern British Columbia, Canada, located between the Sheslay River and Tuya River on the west and east and the Nahlin River and the Stikine River to the north and south. It is a subplateau of the Stikine Plateau; adjoining parts of the same larger plateau are the Taku Plateau to the northwest, the Tahltan Highland to the southwest and south, the Kawdy Plateau to the north, and the Spatsizi Plateau to the southeast. The Nahlin Plateau is the location of the Level Mountain Range and Heart Peaks, two small mountain ranges forming parts of large shield volcanoes.

== See also ==
- List of plateaus in British Columbia
