= Caribou Tuya =

Mountain in British Columbia, Canada

- Location within British Columbia
- Interactive map of Caribou Tuya

Highest point
- Elevation: 1,770 m (5,810 ft)
- Coordinates: 59°14′11″N 130°33′45″W

Geography
- Location: British Columbia, Canada
- District: Cassiar Land District
- Parent range: Tuya Range
- Topo map: NTS 104O2 Tuya Lake

Geology
- Mountain type: Subglacial mound
- Volcanic zone: Northern Cordilleran Volcanic Province
- Volcanic field: Tuya volcanic field
- Last eruption: Pleistocene

Caribou Tuya is a basaltic subglacial mound in far northwestern British Columbia that began eruptive activity under glacial ice during the Fraser glaciation (25 to 10 ka). Like Ash Mountain and South Tuya, sections of the subglacial mound reveal a consistent stratigraphic progression from pillow lavas to hyaloclastite deposits from the base upward. Locally the sections are capped by subaerial basaltic lava flows. Samples of the glassy pillow basalts and hyaloclastites along with crystalline basalt flows were collected at Caribou Tuya. The volcano is believed to have formed and last erupted during the Pleistocene Epoch.

== See also ==
- List of volcanoes in Canada
- List of Northern Cordilleran volcanoes
- Volcanism of Canada
- Volcanism of Western Canada
- Volcanic history of the Northern Cordilleran Volcanic Province
