= Tuya (disambiguation) =

A tuya is a distinctive, flat-topped, steep-sided volcano.

Tuya may refer to:

== Places in northern British Columbia, Canada ==
- Tuya Butte, a flat-topped volcano; the source of the name tuya for that type of volcano
- Tuya Range, a mountain range
- Tuya Lake
- Tuya River
  - Little Tuya River, a tributary of the Tuya River

== Other uses ==
- Tuya (queen), an ancient Egyptian queen
- Thuya, an ancient Egyptian noblewoman
- "Tuya" (Jennifer Peña song), 2007
- "Tuya" (Rosalía song), 2023
- Tuya Inc., a Chinese software company focused on the development of IoT solutions
