= Ash Mountain (British Columbia) =

Mountain in British Columbia, Canada

- Location within British Columbia
- Interactive map of Ash Mountain

Highest point
- Elevation: 2,118 m (6,949 ft)
- Prominence: 757 m (2,484 ft)
- Listing: Mountains of British Columbia
- Coordinates: 59°16′28″N 130°30′32″W

Geography
- Location: British Columbia, Canada
- District: Cassiar Land District
- Parent range: Tuya Range (Stikine Ranges, Cassiar Mountains)
- Topo map: NTS 104O7 Ash Creek

Geology
- Rock age: Pleistocene
- Mountain type: Subglacial mound
- Volcanic field: Tuya volcanic field
- Last eruption: Pleistocene

Ash Mountain is the highest summit in the Tuya Range of the Stikine Ranges in northcentral British Columbia, Canada, located immediately north of High Tuya Lake at the north end of Tuya Mountains Provincial Park. It is one of the six tuyas clustered close to Tuya Lake. The base of the volcano comprises pillow lava and hyaloclastite indicating that the volcano formed beneath ice or under a large lake. The volcano comprises loose debris as well as dikes of basaltic rock that intruded into the volcanic pile. Other tuyas in the area include Tuya Butte, South Tuya and Mathews Tuya, although most of the group of tuyas are unnamed.

== See also ==
- List of subglacial volcanoes
- Volcanism of Western Canada
- Volcanic history of the Northern Cordilleran Volcanic Province
