= Tuya Butte =

Mountain in Canada

- Location within British Columbia
- Interactive map of Tuya Butte

Highest point
- Elevation: 1,685 m (5,528 ft)
- Prominence: 355 m (1,165 ft)
- Coordinates: 59°07′58.1″N 130°34′04.1″W

Geography
- Location: British Columbia, Canada
- District: Cassiar Land District
- Parent range: Tuya Range
- Topo map: NTS 104O2 Tuya Lake

Geology
- Rock age: Pleistocene
- Mountain type: Tuya
- Volcanic zone: Northern Cordilleran Volcanic Province
- Volcanic field: Tuya volcanic field
- Last eruption: Pleistocene

Tuya Butte is a tuya in the Tuya Range of north-central British Columbia, Canada. It is a bit less isolated from other ranges than neighbouring Mount Josephine. Some of the other volcanoes in the area include South Tuya, Ash Mountain, and Mathews Tuya.

Tuya Butte was the first tuya analyzed in the geological literature, and its name has since become standard worldwide among volcanologists in referring to and writing about tuyas. The Tuya Mountains Provincial Park was recently established to protect this unusual landscape, which lies north of Tuya Lake and south of the Jennings River near the boundary with the Yukon Territory. Tuya Butte is regarded as among the best examples of this landform outside Iceland and Antarctica.

Tuya Butte was named by Canadian volcanologist Bill Mathews in association with adjacent Tuya Lake and Butte Lake. The term tuya may be derived from a Tahltan word.

== Geology ==
Tuya Butte is part of the Tuya Volcanic Field, a volcanic field that includes tuyas, postglacial lapilli cones and lava flows and several small shield volcanoes formed during the Pleistocene and Holocene. This in turn is part of the Northern Cordilleran Volcanic Province from Prince Rupert, into the Yukon and the Alaska border caused by rifting of the North American Plate as the Pacific Plate slides northward along the Queen Charlotte Fault.

Tuya Butte formed when magma intruded into and melted a vertical pipe in the overlying Cordilleran Ice Sheet. The partially molten mass cooled as a large block, forming the highly developed hyaloclastite and pillow lava with gravity flattening its upper surface. Horizontal columns occur at numerous locations along the periphery of the mass. The absence of glacial erosion of the tuya suggests that it erupted during the Pleistocene. The volcano has no summit crater or obvious vent, suggesting the volcano was fed by a fissure, although several indictions suggest a vent location near a large cirque on the north face. Other subglacial volcanoes can be found in the Wells Gray-Clearwater volcanic field and the Garibaldi Volcanic Belt.

== See also ==
- List of volcanoes in Canada
- List of Northern Cordilleran volcanoes
- Volcanism of Canada
- Volcanism of Western Canada
- Tuya Mountains Provincial Park
