= Mathews Tuya =

Mountain in British Columbia, Canada

- Location within British Columbia
- Interactive map of Mathews Tuya

Highest point
- Elevation: 1,775 m (5,823 ft)
- Coordinates: 59°11′43″N 130°25′58″W

Geography
- Location: British Columbia, Canada
- District: Cassiar Land District
- Parent range: Tuya Range

Geology
- Rock age: Pleistocene
- Mountain type: Subglacial mound
- Volcanic field: Tuya volcanic field
- Last eruption: Pleistocene

Mathews Tuya is a tuya in northcentral British Columbia. It is one of the six tuyas close to Tuya Lake. It has been partly glaciated and Ar-Ar geochronology shows that is it about 730,000 years old. It mainly comprises palagonitized tephra (tuff, lapilli tuff, tuff breccia) but also has a few dykes and jointed lava flows on its flanks. The top still has flat-lying lava flows erupted after the tephra pile grew above the surface of the enclosing lake. The other volcanoes in the area include Tuya Butte, South Tuya and Ash Mountain. The volcanoes in the region form part of the Northern Cordilleran Volcanic Province.

== See also ==
- List of volcanoes in Canada
- List of Northern Cordilleran volcanoes
- Volcanism of Canada
- Volcanism of Western Canada
