= Bill Mathews =

Canadian geologist and volcanologist

- Born: February 2, 1919; Vancouver, British Columbia
- Died: March 3, 2003 (aged 84)
- Education: University of British Columbia, 1935–1941; University of California, Berkeley, 1946–1948
- Known for: Studying subglacial eruptions and volcano-ice interactions
- Awards: Willet G. Miller Medal, Royal Society of Canada, 1989; Career Achievement Award, Geological Association of Canada, 1994
- Scientific career
- Fields: Geology, Volcanology
- Workplaces: University of California, Berkeley, 1948–1951; University of British Columbia, 1951–2003

William Henry Mathews (1919–2003) was a Canadian geologist, volcanologist, engineer, and professor. He is considered a pioneer in the study of subglacial eruptions and volcano-ice interactions in North America. Many of his publications continue to be regarded as classics in their field.

== Biography ==
Bill Mathews was born in Vancouver, British Columbia in 1919. His mother and a brother died when he was two; his father, Vancouver pioneer Thomas Mathews, died when he was 13.

Mathews attended King George Secondary School before entering the University of British Columbia in 1935, earning a Bachelor of Applied Science in geological engineering in 1940, followed by a Master of Applied Science with a major in petrology and a minor in physics in 1941. During college, he served as a student assistant for the Geological Survey of Canada from 1938 to 1941, and was also an instructor in the mountain infantry school of the Alpine Club of Canada, training personnel for the Canadian armed forces. After graduation, he worked as a mining engineer for the British Columbia Department of Mines from 1942 to 1946.

He then moved to the University of California, Berkeley, completing his Ph.D. in June 1948 with a dissertation titled Geology of the Mount Garibaldi map-area, southwestern British Columbia. While at Berkeley he met and married his wife, Laura Lu Mathews, served on the Berkeley faculty as an assistant professor from 1948 to 1951, and then returned to Canada to accept an associate professorship in the Department of Geography and Geology at the University of British Columbia. He was promoted to full professor in 1959, served as department chairman from 1964 to 1971, and continued teaching until his retirement to professor emeritus status in 1984.

Mathews is credited with proposing the name of Tetrahedron Peak, which he climbed as a member of the Alpine Club of Canada. The name, which describes the shape of the mountain with the four faces, was adopted on 5 April 1956.

Mathews received the Willet G. Miller Medal for "outstanding research in any branch of the earth sciences" from the Royal Society of Canada in 1989. After his retirement from teaching duties, he maintained an active research program and began writing a book on the geology of southern British Columbia, working part-time on the project until his death in 2003. The book was published posthumously in 2005 as Roadside Geology of Southern British Columbia.

== Scientific research ==
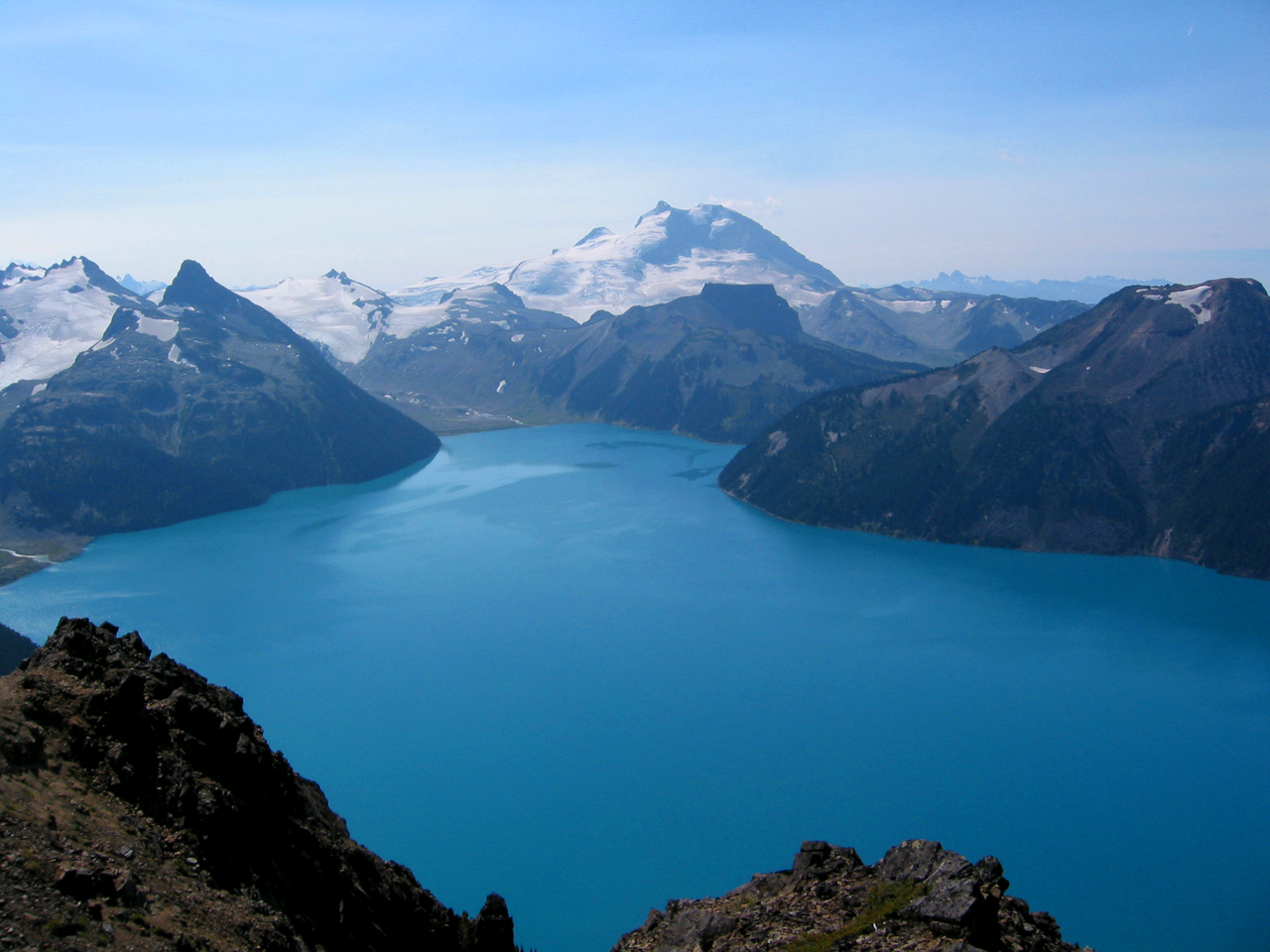
Garibaldi Provincial Park was a major focus of Bill Mathews' scientific career. Garibaldi Lake (foreground), The Table (behind lake), and Mount Garibaldi (background) were each among the subjects of his numerous publications.

Mathews' scientific work embraced a broad spectrum of topics, including volcanoes, glaciers, regional geomorphology, landslides, hydrogeology, stratigraphy, coal geology, and mineral deposits. But his most influential work was in the fields of subglacial eruptions and volcano-ice interactions. He discovered several ideal field laboratories for this research in his home province of British Columbia, including the numerous volcanoes in Garibaldi Provincial Park just north of Vancouver and the remote Tuya Volcanic Field in far northern British Columbia. While still in graduate school at Berkeley in 1947, he published a paper, "Tuyas, Flat-Topped Volcanoes in Northern British Columbia", in which he coined the term "tuya" to refer to the distinctive, flat-topped, steep-sided volcanoes formed when lava erupts through a thick glacier or ice sheet. He took the name from Tuya Butte, a near-ideal specimen of the type, and this name has since become standard worldwide among volcanologists in referring to and writing about these volcanic formations. Late in his career, other scientists named a previously unnamed tuya in the Tuya Volcanic Field in honor of him as Mathews Tuya.

Mathews published his first article, titled "Geology of the Garibaldi Lake area", in the Canadian Alpine Journal in 1938 when he was only 19 years old. He would go on to author more than 100 published scientific papers and reports over the next six decades. A large portion of this body of work is devoted to the numerous fascinating volcanic, glacial, and limnological features of Garibaldi Provincial Park, which he examines, analyzes, and interprets in meticulous detail and with far-reaching insight.

== Bibliography ==
=== Books and theses ===
- Mathews, Bill; Monger, Jim (2005). Roadside Geology of Southern British Columbia. Mountain Press Publishing Company. ISBN 0-87842-503-9. (includes biographical sketch)
- Mathews, William H. (1975). Garibaldi Geology: A popular guide to the geology of the Garibaldi Lake area. Geological Association of Canada.
- Mathews, William Henry (1948). Geology of the Mount Garibaldi map-area, southwestern British Columbia. Thesis (Ph.D.)--University of California, Berkeley. pp. 229 pp.
- Mathews, William Henry (1941). Geology of the Ironmask Batholith. Thesis (Master's)--University of British Columbia, Vancouver, BC.

=== Selected significant articles ===
- Mathews, W. H. (1938). "Geology of the Garibaldi Lake area [British Columbia]". Canadian Alpine Journal. 25: 107–112.
- Mathews, W. H. (September 1, 1947). "Tuyas, flat-topped volcanoes in northern British Columbia". American Journal of Science. 245 (9): 560–570. Bibcode:1947AmJS..245..560M. doi:10.2475/ajs.245.9.560. Archived from the original on September 29, 2011.
- Mathews, W. H. (November 1, 1951). "The Table, a flat-topped volcano in southern British Columbia". American Journal of Science. 249 (11): 830–841. Bibcode:1951AmJS..249..830M. doi:10.2475/ajs.249.11.830. (see The Table)
- Mathews, W. H. (1951). "Historic and prehistoric fluctuations of alpine glaciers in the Mount Garibaldi map-area, southwestern British Columbia". Journal of Geology. 59 (4): 357–380. Bibcode:1951JG.....59..357M. doi:10.1086/625873. S2CID 128970582.
- Mathews, W. H. (February 1, 1952). "Mount Garibaldi, a supraglacial Pleistocene volcano in southwestern British Columbia". American Journal of Science. 250 (2): 81–103. Bibcode:1952AmJS..250...81M. doi:10.2475/ajs.250.2.81.
- Mathews, W. H. (August 1, 1952). "Ice-dammed lavas from Clinker Mountain, southwestern British Columbia". American Journal of Science. 250 (8): 553–565. Bibcode:1952AmJS..250..553M. doi:10.2475/ajs.250.8.553.
- Mathews, W. H. (1953). "Glacier study for the mountaineer". Canadian Alpine Journal. 36: 161–167.
- Mathews, W. H. (1955). "Permafrost and its occurrence in the southern Coast Mountains of British Columbia". Canadian Alpine Journal. 38: 94–98.
- Mathews, W. H. (1956). "Physical limnology and sedimentation in a glacial lake [Garibaldi Lake]". Geological Society of America Bulletin. 67 (5): 537–552. Bibcode:1956GSAB...67..537M. doi:10.1130/0016-7606(1956)67[537:PLASIA]2.0.CO;2. Archived from the original on 2012-02-17.
- Mathews, W. H. (June 1, 1957). "Petrology of Quaternary volcanics of the Mount Garibaldi map-area, southwestern British Columbia". American Journal of Science. 255 (6): 400–415. Bibcode:1957AmJS..255..400M. doi:10.2475/ajs.255.6.400.
- Mathews, W. H. (1958). "Geology of the Mount Garibaldi map-area, southwestern British Columbia, Canada; Part 1, Igneous and metamorphic rocks". Geological Society of America Bulletin. 69 (2): 161–178. Bibcode:1958GSAB...69..161M. doi:10.1130/0016-7606(1958)69[161:GOTMGM]2.0.CO;2.
- Mathews, W. H. (1958). "Geology of the Mount Garibaldi map-area, southwestern British Columbia, Canada; Part 2, Geomorphology and Quaternary volcanic rocks". Geological Society of America Bulletin. 69 (2): 179–198. Bibcode:1958GSAB...69..179M. doi:10.1130/0016-7606(1958)69[179:GOTMGM]2.0.CO;2.
- Williams, P. M.; Mathews, W. H.; Pickard, G. L. (1961). "A lake in British Columbia containing old sea-water". Nature. 191 (4790): 830–832. Bibcode:1961Natur.191..830W. doi:10.1038/191830b0. S2CID 4256946.
- Mathews, W. H. (1965). "Two Self-Dumping Ice-Dammed Lakes in British Columbia". Geographical Review. 55 (1): 46–52. Bibcode:1965GeoRv..55...46M. doi:10.2307/212854. JSTOR 212854.
- Nasmith, H.; Mathews, W. H.; Rouse, G. E. (1967). "Bridge River ash and some other Recent ash beds in British Columbia". Canadian Journal of Earth Sciences. 4 (1): 163–170. Bibcode:1967CaJES...4..163N. doi:10.1139/e67-007.
- Mackay, J. R.; Mathews, W. H. (1974). "Needle ice striped ground". Arctic and Alpine Research. 6 (1): 79–84. doi:10.2307/1550372. JSTOR 1550372.
- Mackay, J. R.; Mathews, W. H. (1974). "Movement of sorted stripes, The Cinder Cone, Garibaldi Park, B. C., Canada". Arctic and Alpine Research. 6 (4): 347–359. doi:10.2307/1550330. JSTOR 1550330.
- Mackay, J. R.; Mathews, W. H. (1975). "Orientation of soil stripes caused by needle ice". Journal of Glaciology. 14 (71): 329–331. Bibcode:1975JGlac..14..329M. doi:10.1017/S002214300002181X.
- Moore, D. P.; Mathews, W. H. (1978). "The Rubble Creek landslide, southwestern British Columbia". Canadian Journal of Earth Sciences. 15 (7): 1039–1052. Bibcode:1978CaJES..15.1039M. doi:10.1139/e78-112.
- Mathews, W. H.; Bustin, R. M. (1984). "Why do the Smoking Hills smoke?". Canadian Journal of Earth Sciences. 21 (7): 737–742. Bibcode:1984CaJES..21..737M. doi:10.1139/e84-080.
- Mathews, W. H.; Clague, J. J. (1993). "The record of jokulhlaups from Summit Lake, northwestern British Columbia". Canadian Journal of Earth Sciences. 30 (3): 499–508. Bibcode:1993CaJES..30..499M. doi:10.1139/e93-039.

== Honors and memberships ==
- Willet G. Miller Medal, Royal Society of Canada, 1989
- Career Achievement Award, Geological Association of Canada, 1995
- Fellow of the Royal Society of Canada
- Fellow of the Geological Society of America
- American Geophysical Union
- Geological Association of Canada
- Phi Beta Kappa
- Sigma Xi
- Alpine Club of Canada
- British Glaciological Society
- Arctic Institute of North America
- Natural History Society of British Columbia
