= Ingólfsfjall =

Volcano in Iceland

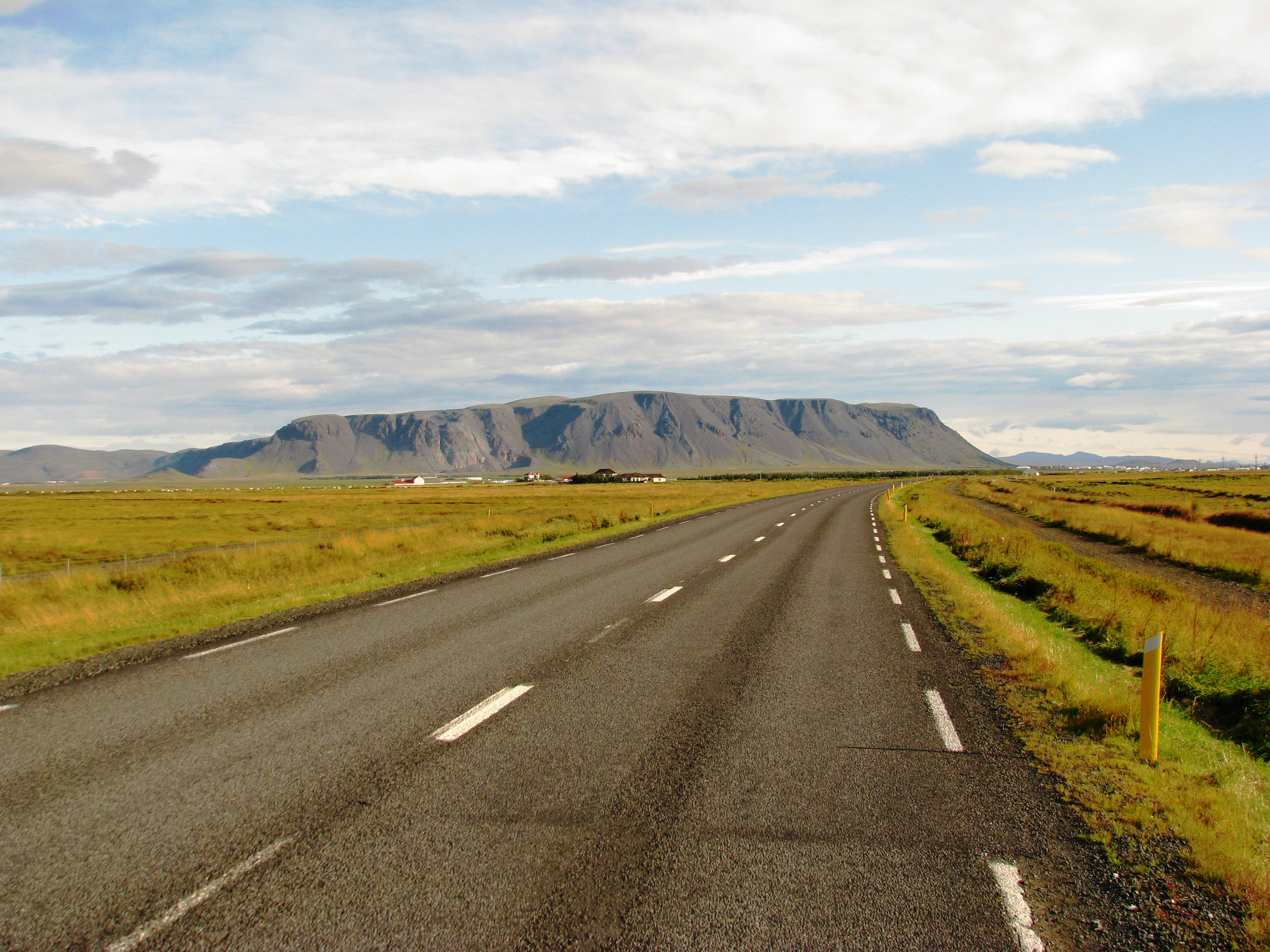

Highest point
- Elevation: Mountain: 551 m (1,808 ft)
- Coordinates: 63°59′56″N 21°04′14″W

Geography
- Location within Iceland

Geology
- Mountain type: Tuya

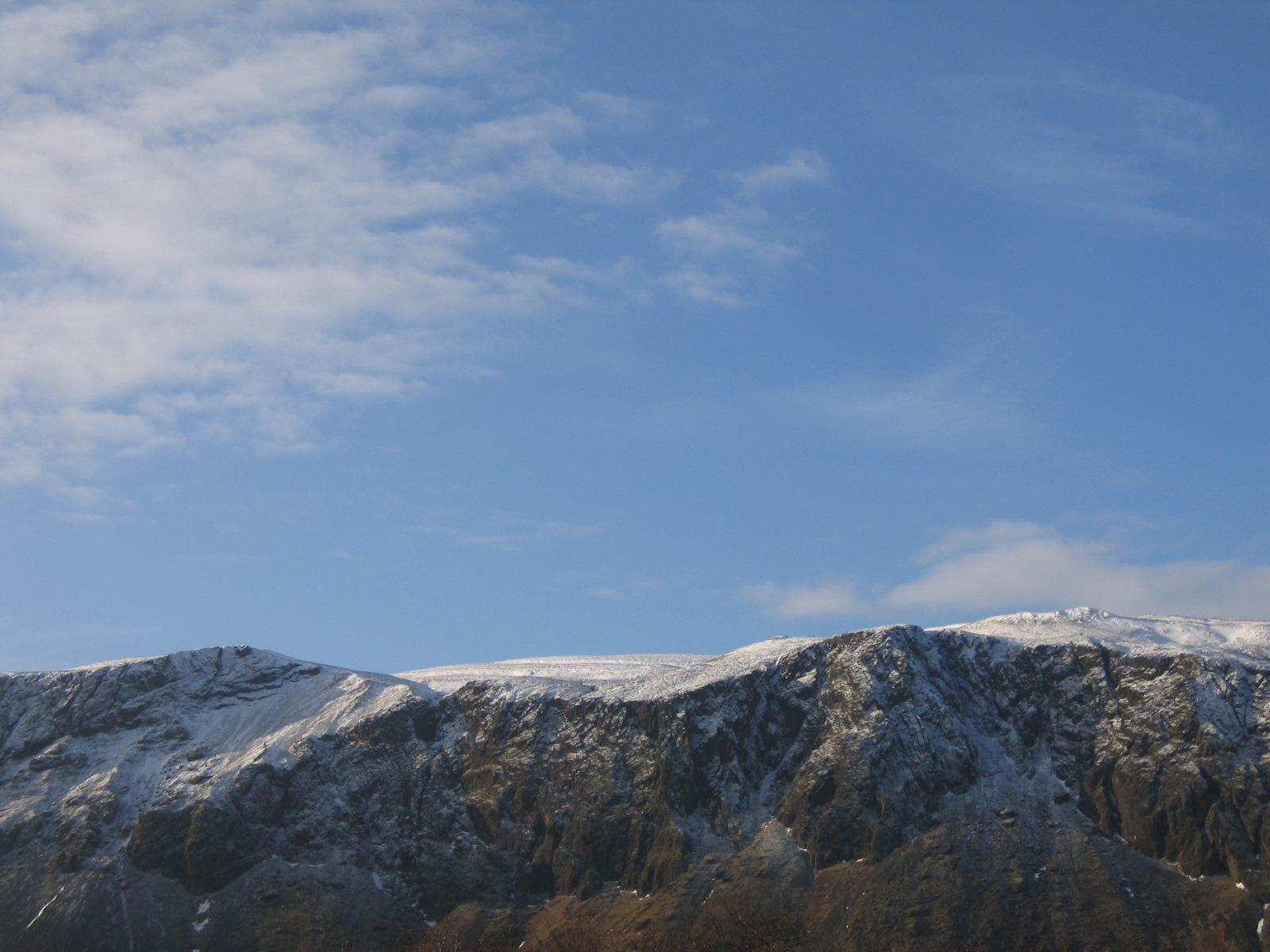
The top of Ingólfsfjall with a small lava hill from subaerial eruptions

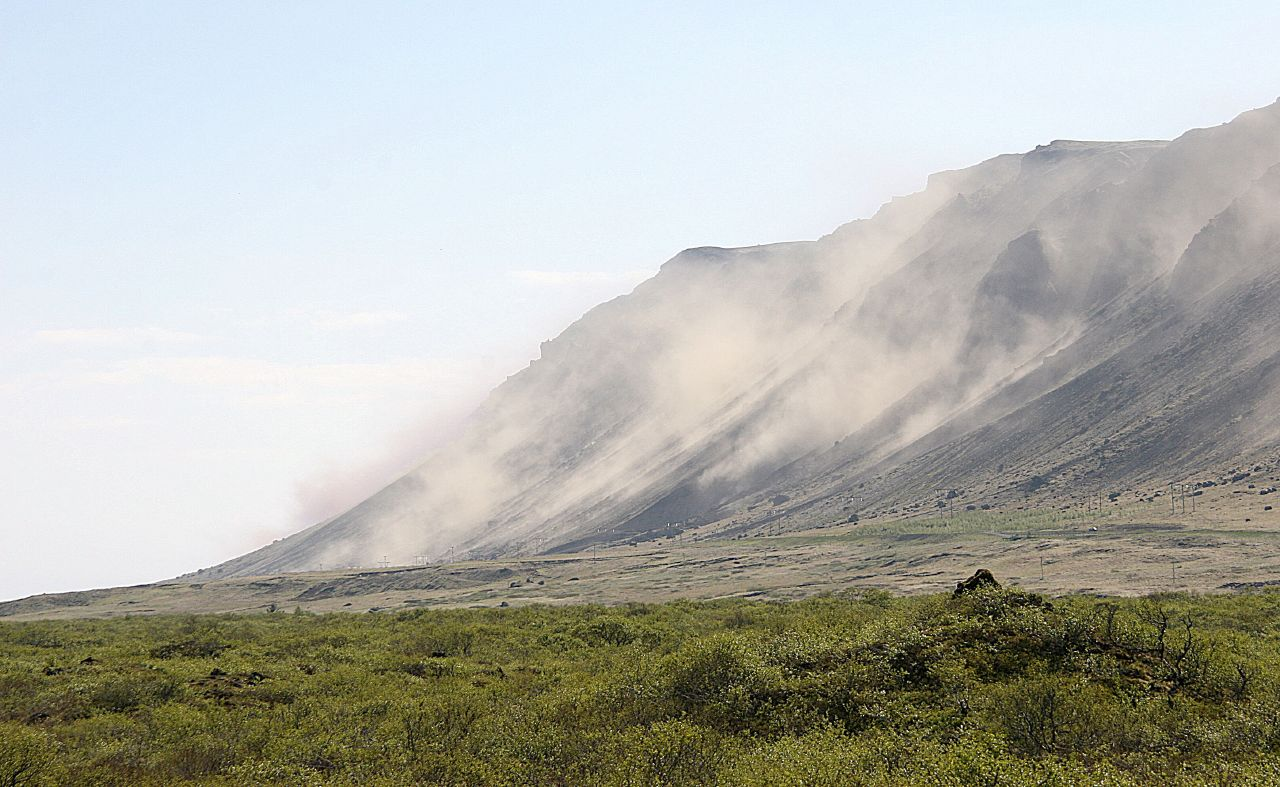
Landslides at Ingólfsfjall during the 6.3 quake in 2008

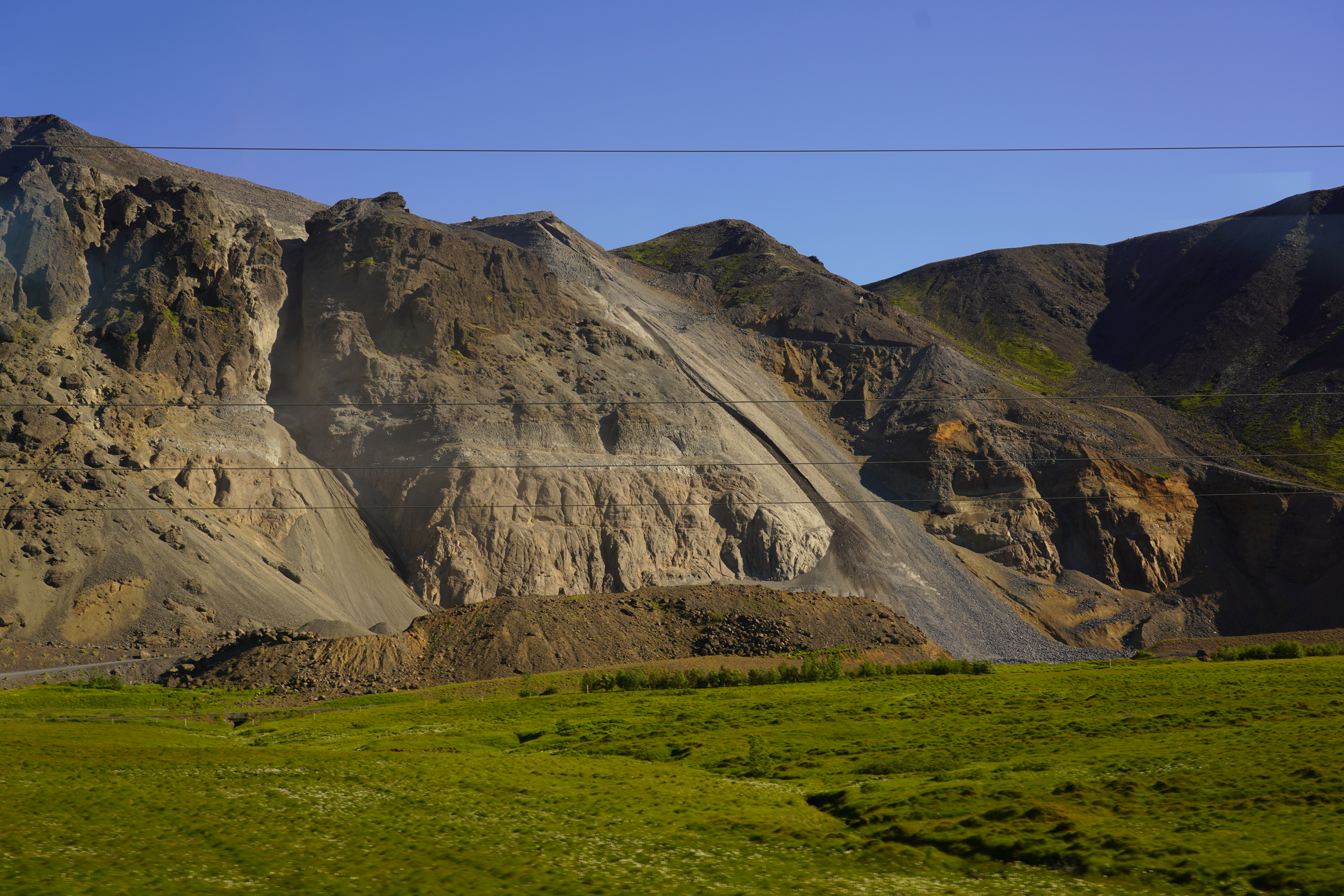
The quarry at Ingólfsfjall

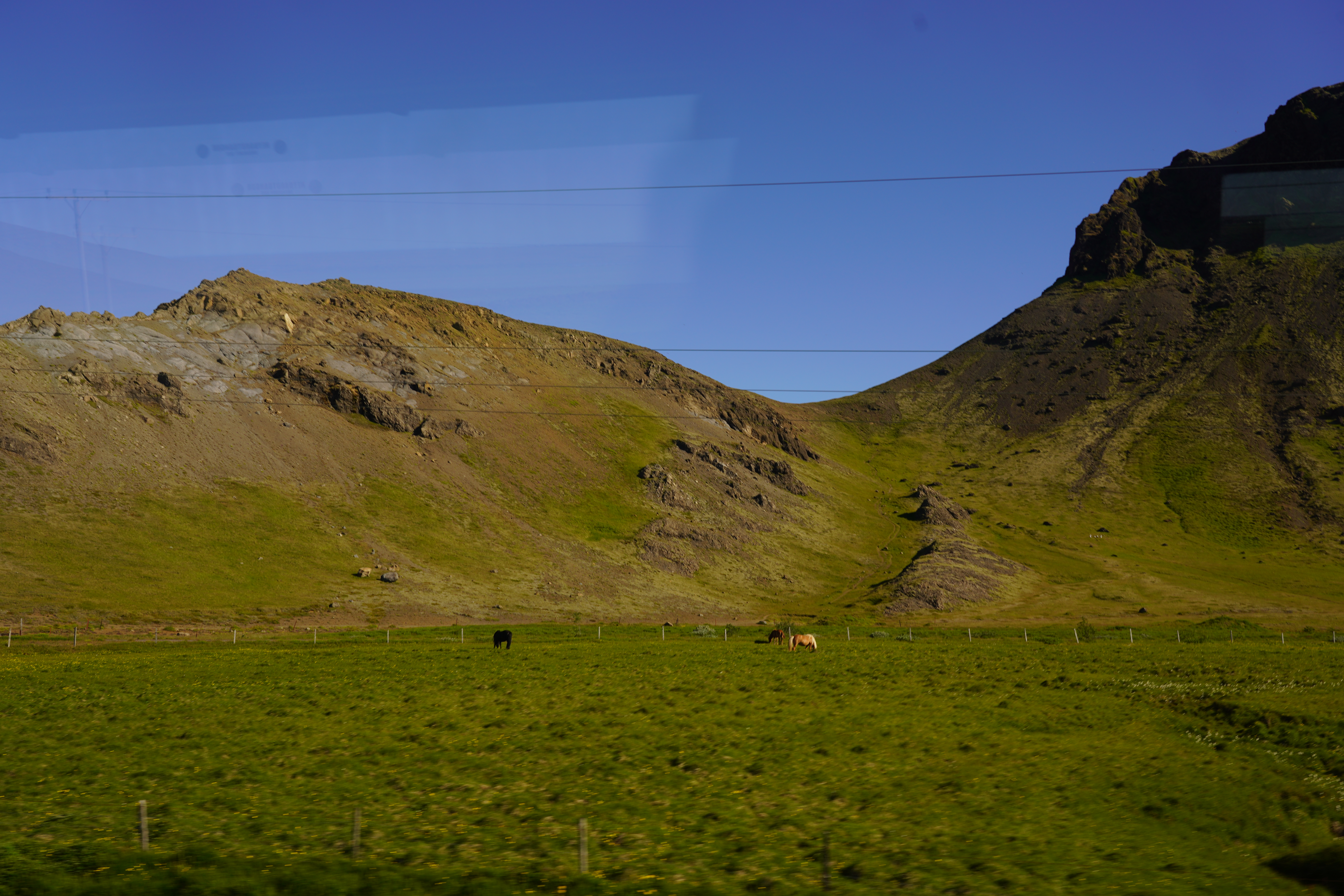
Silfurberg

Ingólfsfjall (Icelandic pronunciation: [ˈiŋkoul(f)sˌfjatl̥]) is a 551-metre-high (1,808 ft) tuya in Iceland in the vicinity of Hveragerði.

== Name ==
The name is derived from Iceland's official first settler, Ingólfur Arnarson. The Medieval Landnámabók says that he passed here his third winter in Iceland after his arrival from Norway with his clan, and before his slaves found the columns of his high seat and he went to the region of Reykjavík to settle there. The source also states that the chief was buried within the small mound on top of Ingólfsfjall.

== Geology ==
Ingólfsfjall consists mostly of basalt and palagonite and has its origin in subglacial eruptions which turned in the end subaerial and produced some lava at its top.

A quarry at the southern side of the mountain near the National Road no. 1 (Hringvegur/Suðurlandsvegur) shows some of these layers which consist mostly of igneous as well as sedimentary rocks. The oldest of these rocks have an age of around 800 000 years. The main volcanic bulk is about 400-500 000 years old.

By the end of the last Ice Age (Pleistocene), the mountain formed a small peninsula, because the sea level had risen after many glaciers had thawed. The uplift of the land itself followed not until much later.

=== The 2008 earthquake ===
The mountain is situated in a tectonically very active zone, the South Iceland Seismic Zone. In 2008, the hypocentre of a 6.3 earthquake was situated just under Ingólfsfjall so that many landslides happened at its flanks.

=== Silfurberg ===
On the southwestern side of the mountain in the direction of the Hringvegur, there is a small truncated spur. It is interesting, because the rocks have a color different of all the other layers of Ingólfsfjall. This color reminds of silver, and so it was called Silfurberg.

In reality, this is palagonite which has been hydrothermally altered by a basaltic dike.
