= South Tuya =

Mountain in British Columbia, Canada

- Location within British Columbia
- Interactive map of South Tuya

Highest point
- Elevation: 1,850 m (6,070 ft)
- Coordinates: 59°12′31″N 130°30′19″W

Geography
- Location: British Columbia, Canada
- District: Cassiar Land District
- Parent range: Tuya Range

Geology
- Rock age: Pleistocene
- Mountain type: Tuya
- Volcanic field: Tuya volcanic field
- Last eruption: Pleistocene

South Tuya, also called Southern Tuya, is a tuya clustered around Tuya Lake in the Northern Cordilleran Volcanic Province in British Columbia, Canada. The base of South Tuya comprises hyaloclastite and pillow lava indicating that the volcano formed beneath a large lake or beneath ice.

== See also ==
- List of volcanoes in Canada
- List of Northern Cordilleran volcanoes
- Volcanism of Canada
- Volcanism of Western Canada
