= Tuya Range =

Mountain range in British Columbia, Canada

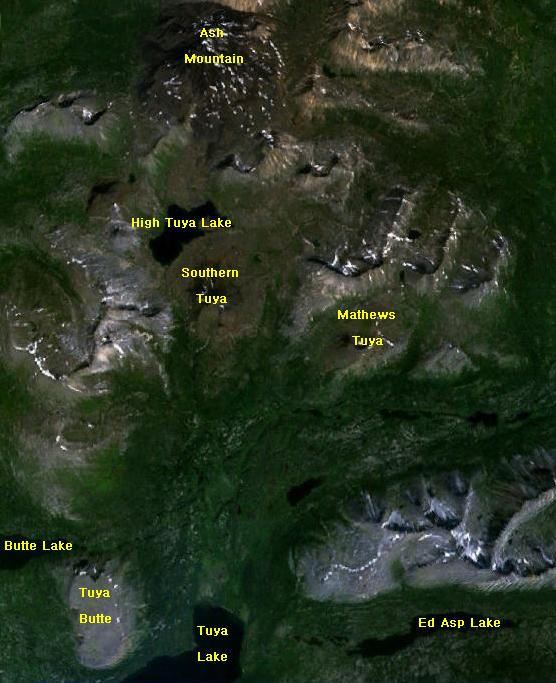
- Map of some features in the Tuya Volcanic Field, which is part of the Tuya Range

Highest point
- Peak: Ash Mountain
- Elevation: 2,118 m (6,949 ft)
- Coordinates: 59°20′39.8″N 130°30′31″W

Geography
- Location within British Columbia Location within Canada
- Country: Canada
- Province: British Columbia
- Range coordinates: 59°17′59″N 130°32′06″W
- Parent range: Stikine Ranges

Geology
- Orogeny: Volcanism
- Rock age: Pleistocene
- Rock type: Tuyas

The Tuya Range is a mountain range in the Stikine Ranges of the Cassiar Mountains in the far north of the Canadian province of British Columbia, near its border with the Yukon Territory and to the southwest of Watson Lake, Yukon, which is the nearest major settlement.

== Boundaries and landforms ==
The northern and northwest side of the range is drained by tributaries of the Cottonwood River; the southern and southwestern flank is formed by Tuya Lake and its tributary, Butte Creek, while the southeast flank is formed by the Cottonwood River and its tributaries (the Cottonwood is a tributary of the Dease River, the Tuya of the Stikine). The range's northern boundary is formed by the upper Jennings River, a tributary of the Teslin River system which is part of the Yukon River drainage. Thus, the triple divide between the Mackenzie, Stikine, and Yukon River basins lies within the range. The Continental Divide transits the eastern side of the range, though does not touch on its highest summit, Ash Mountain, which is at the north end of the range and is within the basin of the Jennings. The range has an area of 777 km^{2} (300 sq mi) and, other than Ash Mountain, includes Tuya Butte, Mathews Tuya, Caribou Tuya, and South Tuya. All of these are part of the Tuya Volcanic Field, which includes other volcanic features north and west of the range

Ash Mountain 2,118 m (6,949 ft) is the highest tuya in the range. The nearby Kawdy Plateau to the west, to the southwest of Kawdy Mountain, is near-entirely formed by the spectacular shield volcano of Level Mountain.

Tuya Butte 1,685 m (5,528 ft) was the first tuya analyzed in the geological literature, and its name has since become standard worldwide among volcanologists in referring to and writing about tuyas. The Tuya Mountains Provincial Park was recently established to protect this unusual landscape, which lies north of Tuya Lake and south of the Jennings River near the boundary with the Yukon Territory.

Black Spruce is a dominant tree in this area; this species is near the western limit of its range.

== See also ==
- Volcanism of Canada
- Volcanism of Western Canada
- List of volcanoes in Canada
