= Tetrahedron Provincial Park =

Provincial park in British Columbia

- IUCN category II (national park)
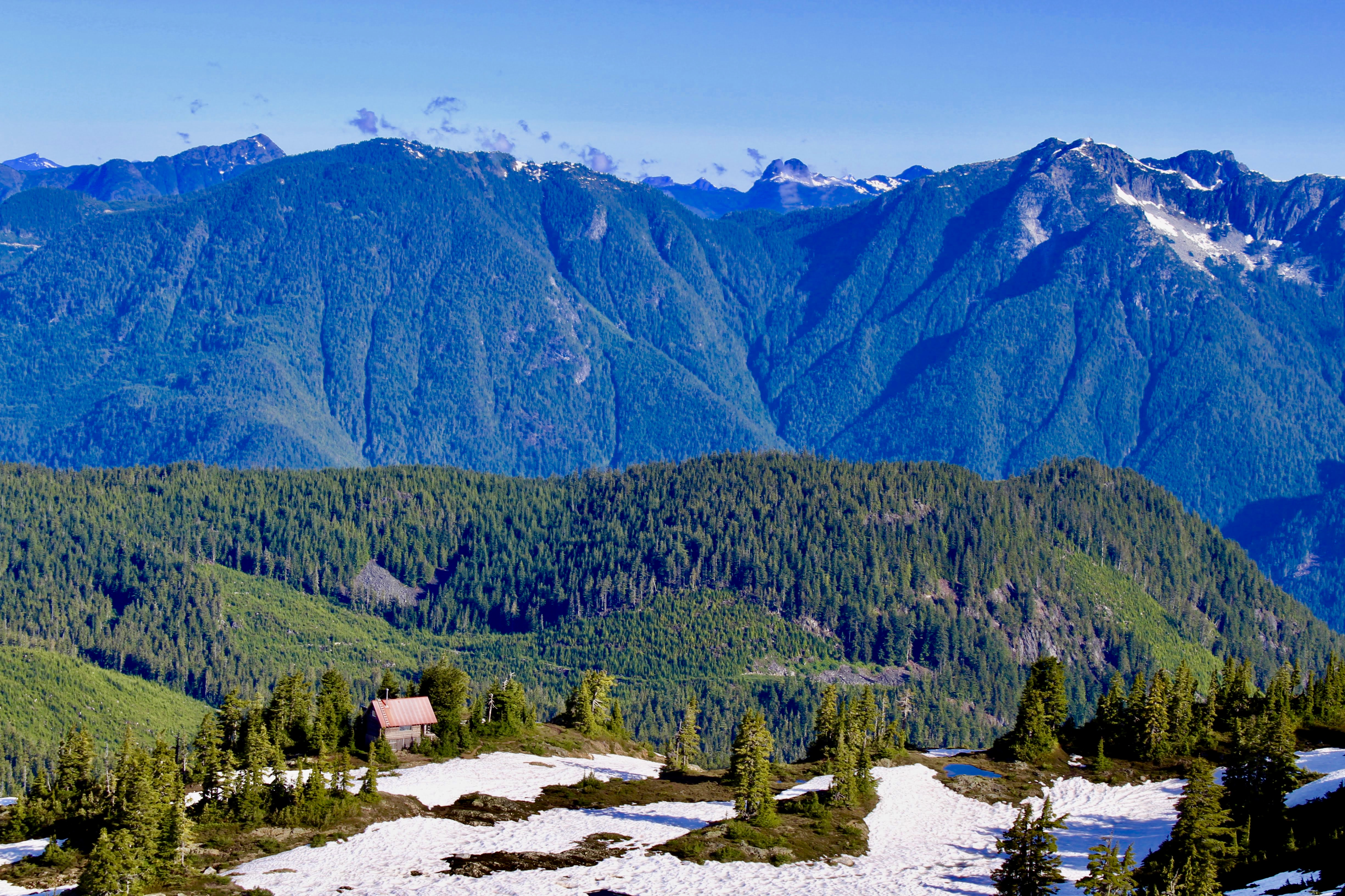
- Panoramic view with Mount Steele in the background

- Location within British Columbia
- Interactive map of Tetrahedron Provincial Park
- Location: British Columbia, Canada
- Nearest city: Sechelt
- Coordinates: 49°35′40″N 123°35′36″W
- Area: 60 km^{2} (23 sq mi)
- Established: July 13, 1995
- Governing body: BC Parks

Tetrahedron Provincial Park is a provincial park located within the territory of the shíshálh Nation on the southern Sunshine Coast, in British Columbia, Canada. The park was created in 1995 thanks to the efforts of a collective of NGOs who came together to protect the headwaters of the Chapman Creek and Gray Creek Community Watersheds from commercial logging activities. It is named for Tetrahedron Peak, which itself is named for its four faces.

== Geography ==
The park's highest point is Tetrahedron Peak, at an elevation of 1727 metres. It also contains Panther Peak (1681m), and Mt. Steele (1651m).

== See also ==
- BC Parks
