= Hlöðufell =

Volcano in Iceland

Coordinates: 64°25′N 20°32′W

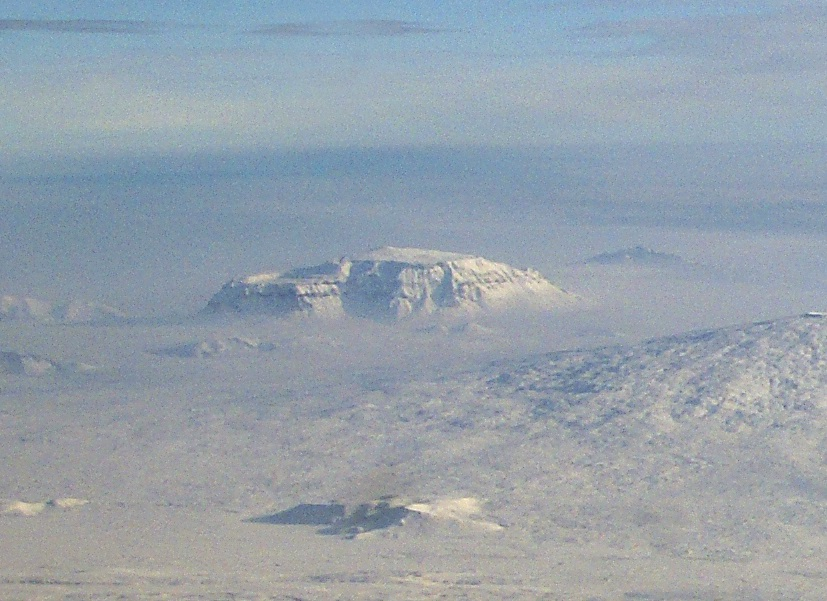
Aerial photograph of Hlöðufell

Hlöðufell (Icelandic pronunciation: [ˈl̥œːðʏˌfɛtl̥]) is a tuya volcano, located about 10 km southwest of Langjökull, Iceland. Hlöðufell is 1188 metres above sea level, and was formed when lava erupted through Langjökull (which was larger during the last ice age) during the Pleistocene. The tuya also has the characteristics of a composite volcano.

== See also ==
- Volcanism of Iceland
- List of volcanoes in Iceland
