= Tetrahedron Peak =

Mountain in British Columbia, Canada

Coordinates: 49°36′28″N 123°34′02″W

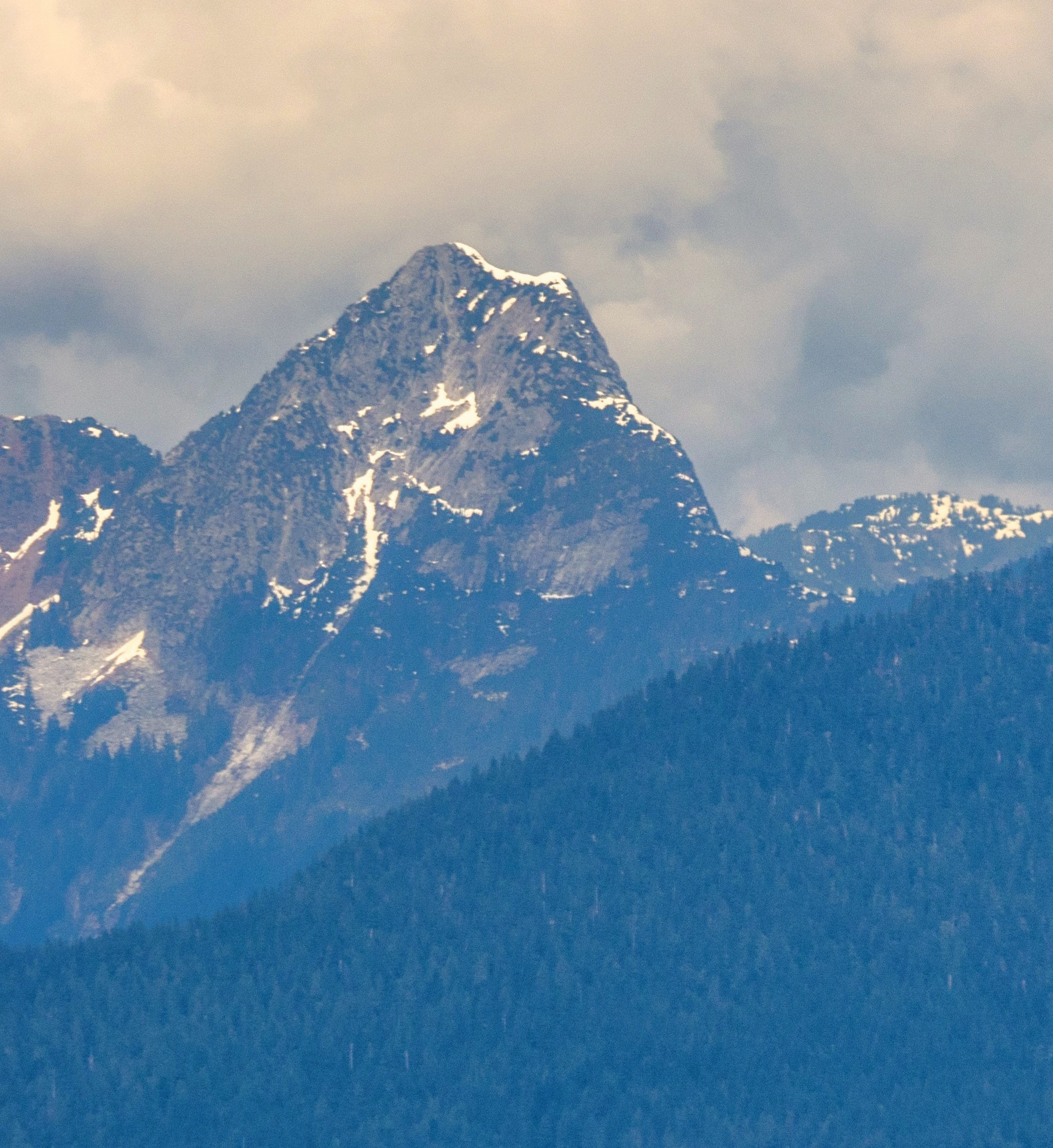
- Southeast aspect

Highest point
- Elevation: 1,739 m (5,705 ft)
- Prominence: 1,164 m (3,819 ft)

Geography
- Location within British Columbia
- Interactive map of Tetrahedron Peak
- Location: British Columbia, Canada
- District: New Westminster Land District
- Parent range: Coast Mountains
- Topo map: NTS 92G12 Sechelt Inlet

Tetrahedron Peak is a mountain in British Columbia, Canada. One of the highest peaks on the Sunshine Coast, it rises to an elevation of 1739 metres (5705 ft), with a prominence of 1164 metres (3819 ft). It is located in the Tetrahedron Provincial Park. The name of the peak describes the shape of the mountain, which has four faces, and was proposed by Bill Mathews, a University of British Columbia geology professor who climbed the mountain in the 1950s.

== Climate ==
Based on the Köppen climate classification, Tetrahedron Peak is located in the marine west coast climate zone of western North America. Most weather fronts originate in the Pacific Ocean, and travel east toward the Coast Mountains where they are forced upward by the range (orographic lift), causing them to drop their moisture in the form of rain or snowfall. As a result, the Coast Mountains experience high precipitation, especially during the winter months in the form of snowfall. Winter temperatures can drop below 0 °C with wind chill factors below −10 °C.
