= Underwater volcano =

Underwater volcano may refer to:

- Subaqueous volcano, a volcano that forms under water
- Submarine volcano, a volcano that forms under an ocean

== See also ==
- Subglacial volcano
