= Subglacial eruption =

Eruption of an ice-covered volcano

Subglacial eruption: 1 water vapor cloud, 2 lake, 3 ice, 4 layers of lava and ash, 5 strata, 6 pillow lava, 7 magma conduit, 8 magma chamber, 9 dike

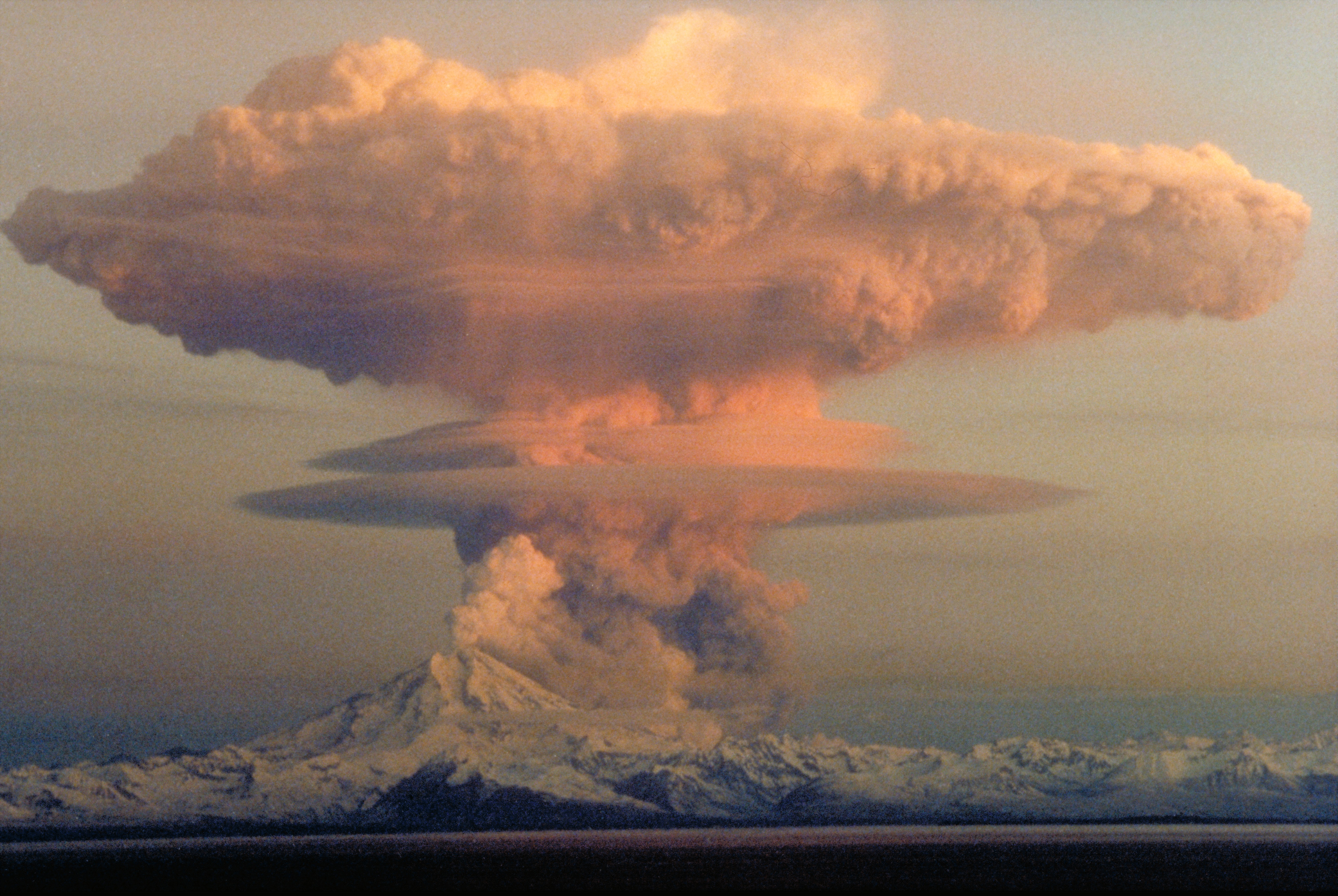
Explosive subglacial eruption of Mount Redoubt, Alaska

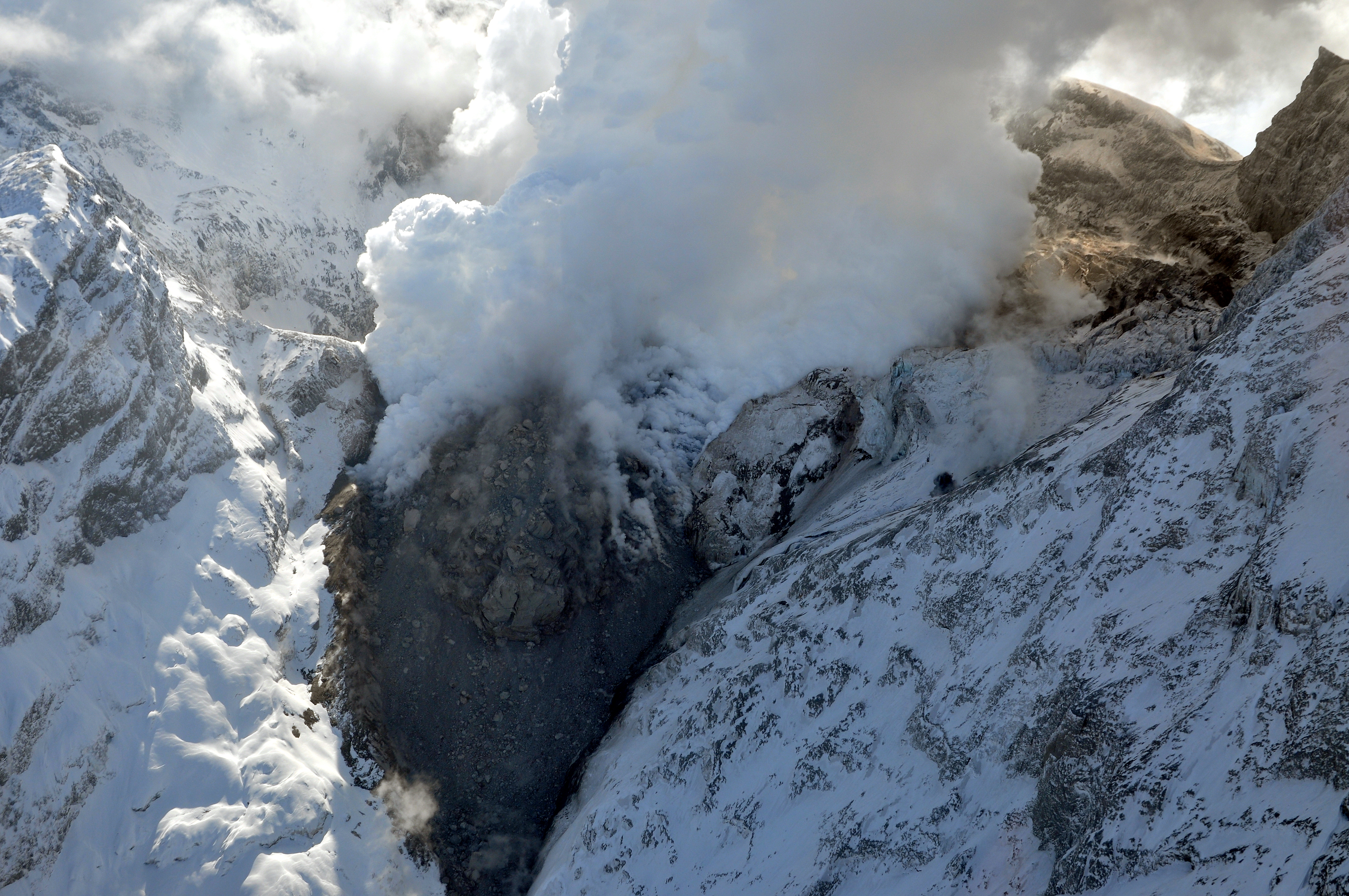
Subglacial lava dome extrusion at Mount Redoubt, Alaska

Subglacial eruptions, those of ice-covered volcanoes, result in the interaction of magma with ice and snow, leading to meltwater formation, jökulhlaups, and lahars. Flooding associated with meltwater is a significant hazard in some volcanic areas, including Iceland, Alaska, and parts of the Andes. Jökulhlaups (glacial outburst floods) have been identified as the most frequently occurring volcanic hazard in Iceland, with major events where peak discharges of meltwater can reach 10,000 – 100,000 m^{3}/s occurring when there are large eruptions beneath glaciers. It is important to explore volcano-ice interactions to improve the effectiveness of monitoring these events and to undertake hazard assessments. This is particularly relevant given that subglacial eruptions have demonstrated their ability to cause widespread impact, with the ash cloud associated with Iceland's Eyjafjallajökull eruption in 2010 resulting in significant impacts to aviation across Europe.

== Examples ==
=== Deception Island, Antarctica (1969) ===
Given that subglacial eruptions occur in often sparsely populated regions, they are not commonly observed or monitored; thus timings and sequences of events for an eruption of this type are poorly constrained. Research of the 1969 Deception Island eruption demonstrates that the impact of a subglacial eruption is not limited purely by glacier thickness, but that the pre-volcanic ice structure and densification (proportion of impermeable ice) play a role as well. In this case, even though the glacier was thin, a large jökulhlaup was observed as the glacier was largely made up of impermeable (unfractured) ice with a sudden supraglacial flood once the cavity has reached capacity. The resulting flood severely damaged buildings on the island, with complete destruction of a British scientific station.

=== Grímsvötn, Iceland (1996) ===
Over a period of 13 days in 1996, 3 km^{2} of ice was melted with erupted magma fracturing into glass to form a 7 km long and 300 m high hyaloclastite ridge under 750 m of ice at Gjalp fissure vent of Grímsvötn volcano in Iceland. Meltwater flowed along a narrow basal glacier bed into a subglacial lake for five weeks, before being released as a sudden flood, or jökulhlaup. Although it has been proposed that subglacial volcanism may play a role in the dynamics of West Antarctic ice streams by supplying water to their base, for the Gjalp eruption, no rapid basal sliding was observed at the regional scale, with the formation of ice cauldrons over eruptive fissures due to the sudden removal of mass at the base.

Research demonstrated that for warm-based glaciers, the effects of subglacial volcanic eruptions are localised, with eruptions forming deep depressions and causing jökulhlaups. For there to be significant changes in the extent and shape of an ice sheet, extensive subglacial volcanism would be required, melting a considerable fraction of the total ice volume over a short period of time.

=== Eyjafjallajökull, Iceland (2010) ===
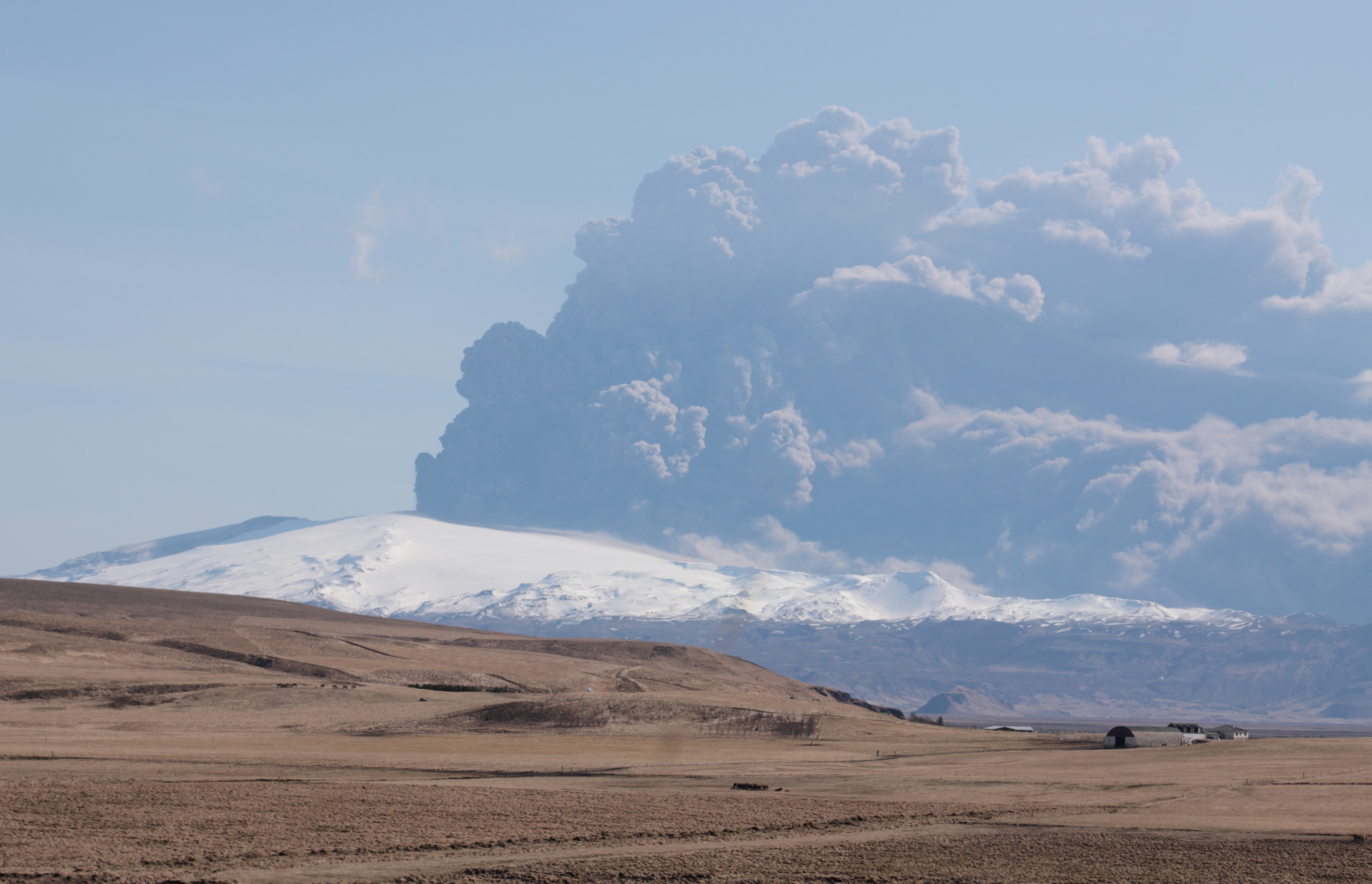
Explosive subglacial eruption at Eyjafjallajökull, Iceland, in 2010

In the first two days of the eruption, ice cauldrons were formed over the volcanic vents. Radar images reveal the development of these cauldrons in a 200 m thick ice cover within the summit caldera. They can also be used to document the subglacial and supraglacial passage of meltwater away from the eruption site. Research shows the eruption breached the ice surface four hours after the initial eruption onset, whilst meltwater release was characterised by accumulation and subsequent drainage, with most of the volcanic material in the ice cauldrons being drained in hyperconcentrated floods.

== See also ==
- Pillow lava
- Subaqueous volcano
- Subglacial mound
- Subglacial volcano
- Submarine volcano
- Tuya
- Types of volcanic eruptions
