= Tuya Mountains Provincial Park =

Provincial park in the Stikine Region of British Columbia, Canada

- IUCN category II (national park)
- Location within British Columbia
- Interactive map of Tuya Mountains Provincial Park
- Location: British Columbia, Canada
- Nearest city: Cassiar
- Coordinates: 59°10′19″N 130°29′59″W
- Area: 180.01 km^{2} (69.50 sq mi)
- Established: April 11, 2001
- Governing body: BC Parks

Tuya Mountains Provincial Park is a provincial park in British Columbia, Canada, protecting the Tuya Range, a volcanic region at the head of the Tuya River. The park is located on the north side of Tuya Lake. The park is named for nearby tuyas, steep-sided, flat-topped types of volcano.
