= Tuya =

Flat-topped, steep-sided volcano

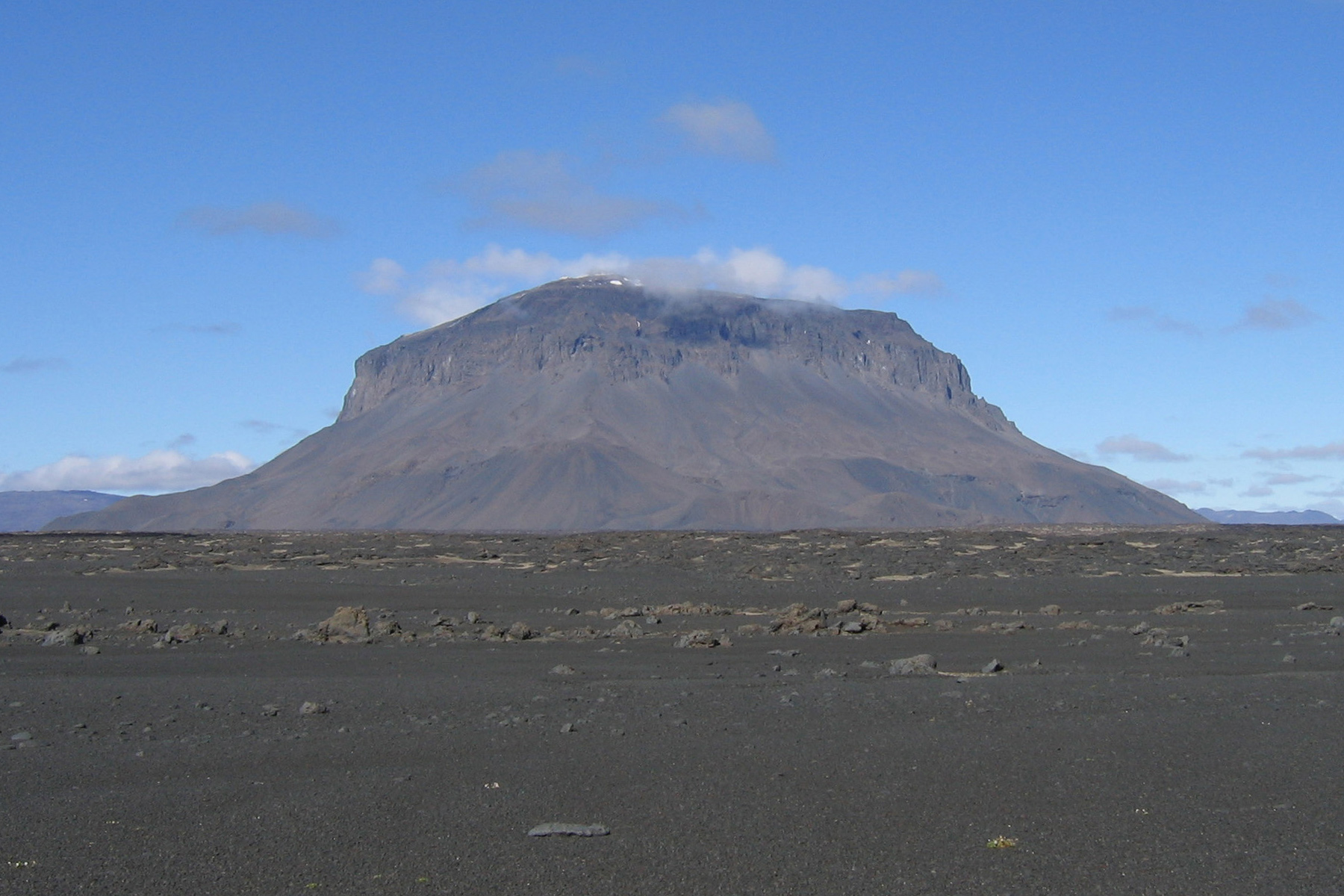
Herðubreið, a tuya in Iceland

A tuya is a flat-topped, steep-sided volcano formed when lava erupts through a thick glacier or ice sheet. They are rare worldwide, being confined to regions which were covered by glaciers and had active volcanism during the same period.

As lava that erupts under a glacier cools very quickly and cannot travel far, it piles up into a steep-sided hill. If the eruption continues long enough, it either melts all the ice or emerges through the top of the ice and then creates normal-looking lava flows that make a flat cap on top of the hill. Discovering and dating the lava flows in a tuya has proven useful in reconstructing past glacial ice extents and thicknesses.

== Formation ==
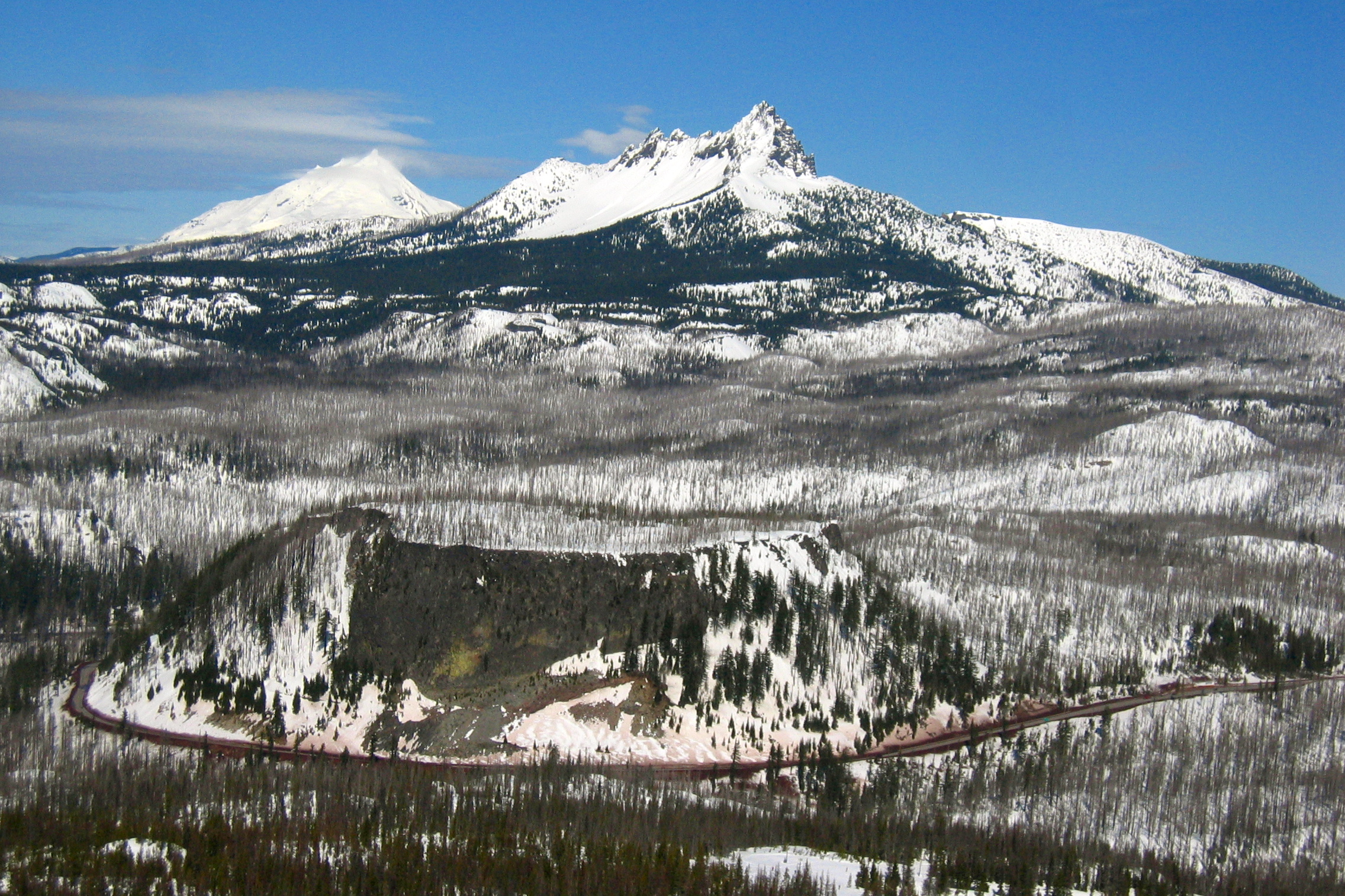
Hogg Rock (foreground), Oregon

Tuyas are a type of subglacial volcano that consists of nearly horizontal beds of lava capping outward-dipping beds of fragmental volcanic rocks, and they often rise in isolation above a surrounding plateau. Tuyas are found in Iceland, British Columbia, the Santiam Pass region in Oregon, the Tyva Republic in eastern Russia, the Antarctic Peninsula and beneath the West Antarctic Ice Sheet. Tuyas in Iceland are sometimes called table mountains because of their flat tops.

S. Holland, a geographer for the British Columbia government, described tuyas in the following way:

They have a most interesting origin ... [they were] formed by volcanic eruptions which had been thawed through the Pleistocene ice-sheet by underlying volcanic heat. The lavas capping the mountains were extruded after the volcanoes were built above lake-level, and the outward-dipping beds were formed by the chilling of the lava when it reached the water's edge.

Because they erupt under ice and water, tuyas have phreatomagmatic eruptions creating layers of breccia and hyaloclastite above pillow lavas. If the volcano breaches the surface of the glacier it will be topped by a subaerially erupted lava plateau.

== Etymology ==
The origin of the term comes from Tuya Butte, one of many tuyas in the area of the Tuya River and Tuya Range in far northern British Columbia, Canada. While still in graduate school in 1947, Canadian geologist Bill Mathews published a paper titled, "Tuyas, Flat-Topped Volcanoes in Northern British Columbia", in which he coined the term "tuya" to refer to these distinctive volcanic formations. Tuya Butte is a near-ideal specimen of the type, the first such landform analyzed in the geological literature, and this name has since become standard worldwide among volcanologists in referring to and writing about these formations. Tuya Mountains Provincial Park was recently established to protect this unusual landscape, which lies north of Tuya Lake and south of the Jennings River near the boundary with Yukon. Around the same time that Mathews published his paper, the Icelandic geologist Guðmundur Kjartansson had distinguished between "móberg" ridges and tuyas in Iceland and proposed the hypothesis that they were formed during subglacial and intraglacial eruptions.

The term tuya may be derived from a Tahltan word.

== Examples ==
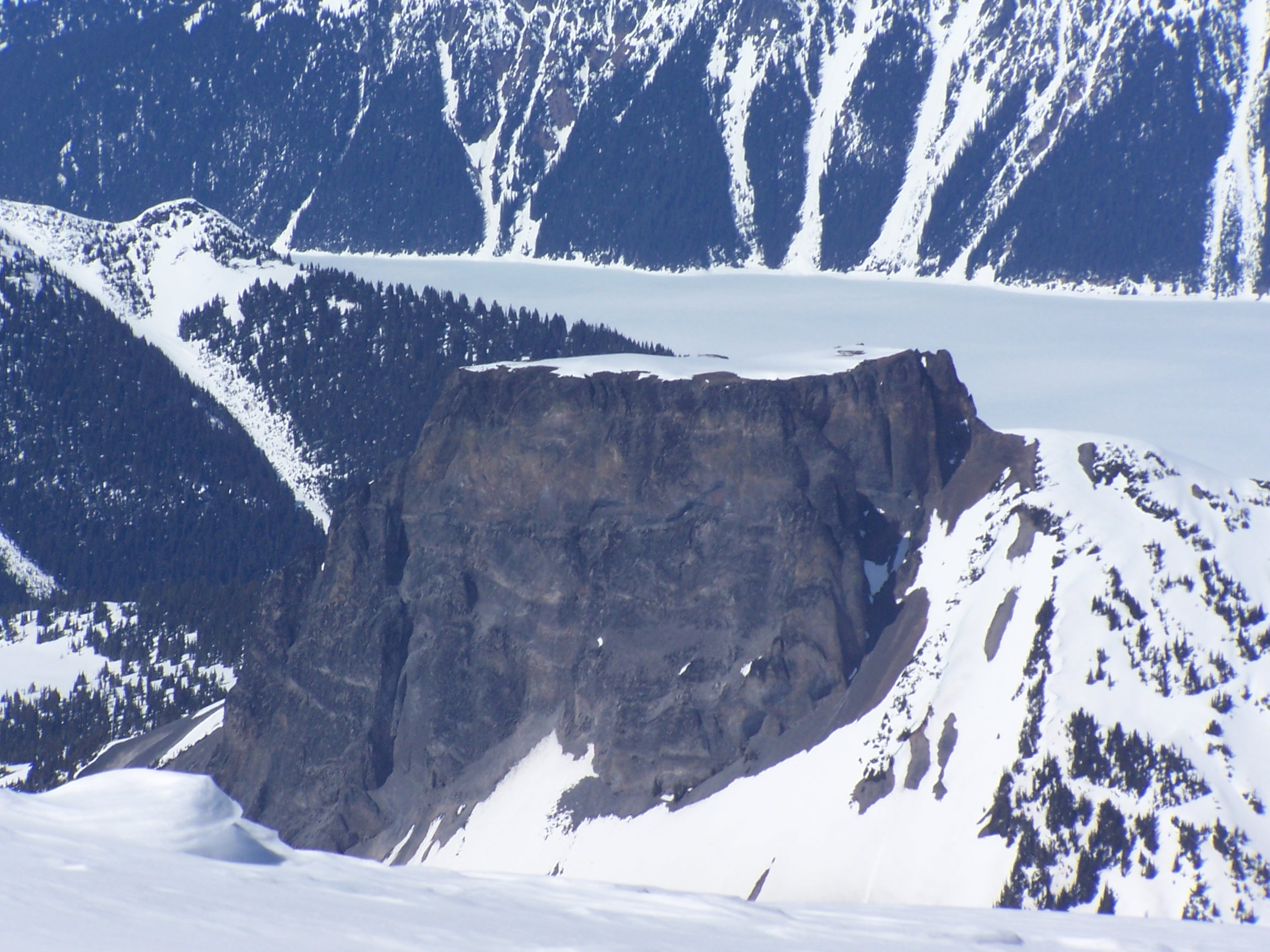
The Table, British Columbia

Antarctica:

- Brown Bluff
- Cape Purvis
- Dobson Dome

Canada:

- Tuya Butte
- Tuya Volcanic Field
- The Table

United States:

- Hayrick Butte
- Hogg Rock
- Togiak Tuya

Iceland:

- Bláfjall
- Bláfjallsgardur
- Búrfell
- Eíriksjökull
- Fagradalsfjall
- Gaesafjöll
- Hagafell
- Herðubreið
- Hlöðufell
- Hrútfell
- Ingólfsfjall
- Kistufell
- Lambafjöll
- Loðmundur
- Sellandafjall
- Strútur

Tuva Republic:

- Azas Plateau:
  - Sorug-Chushku-Uzu
  - Shivit-Taiga
  - Kokhemskii
  - Priozernyi
  - Ulug-Arginskii

== See also ==
- Butte – Isolated hill with steep, often vertical sides and a small, relatively flat top
- Glaciovolcanism – Volcanism related to glacial phenomena
- Mesa – Elevated area of land with a flat top and sides, usually much wider than buttes
- Table Mountain (disambiguation)
