= Hyaloclastite =

Volcanic rock consisting of glass fragments

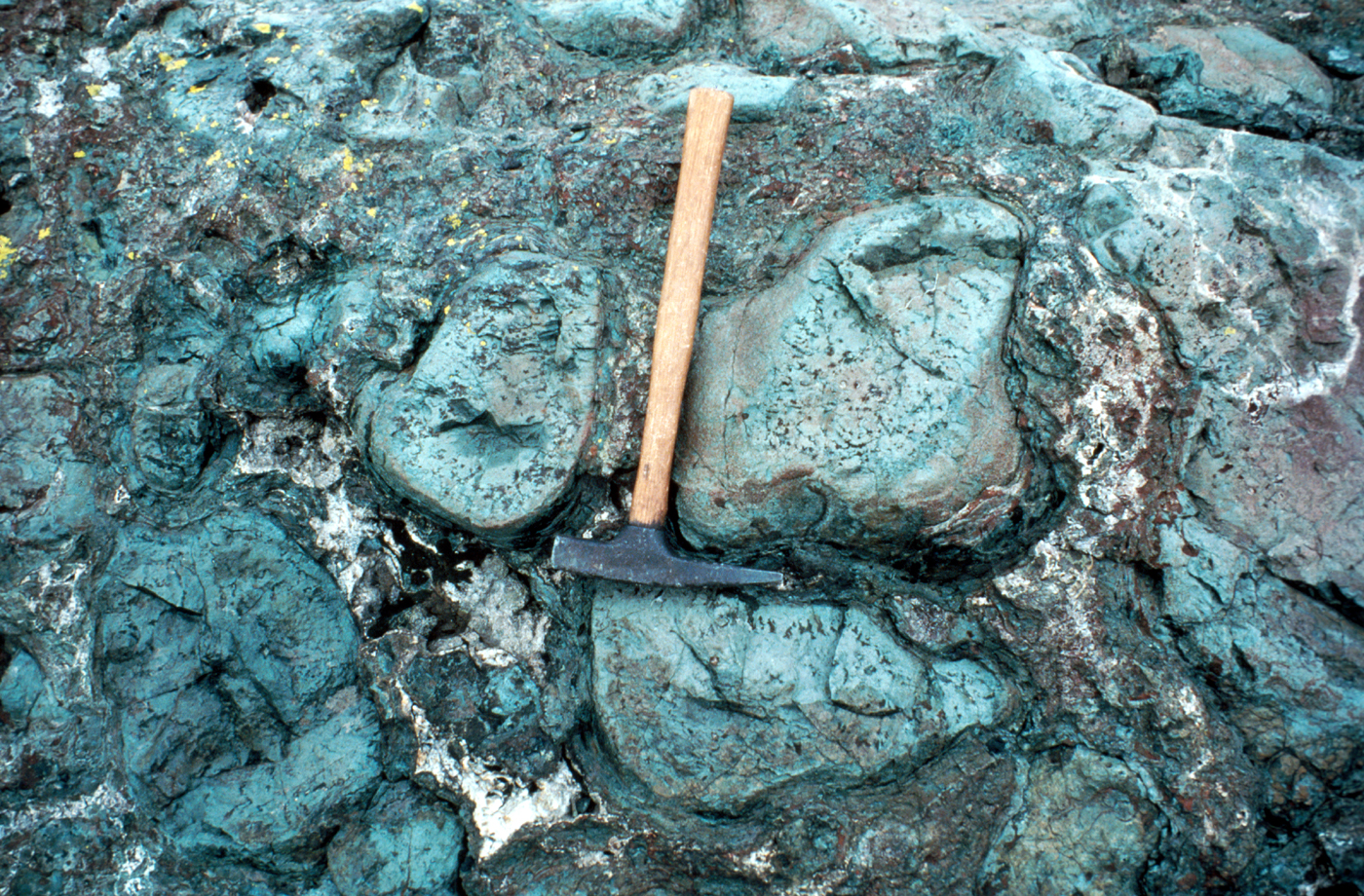
Hyaloclastite between pillows of lava in Montana

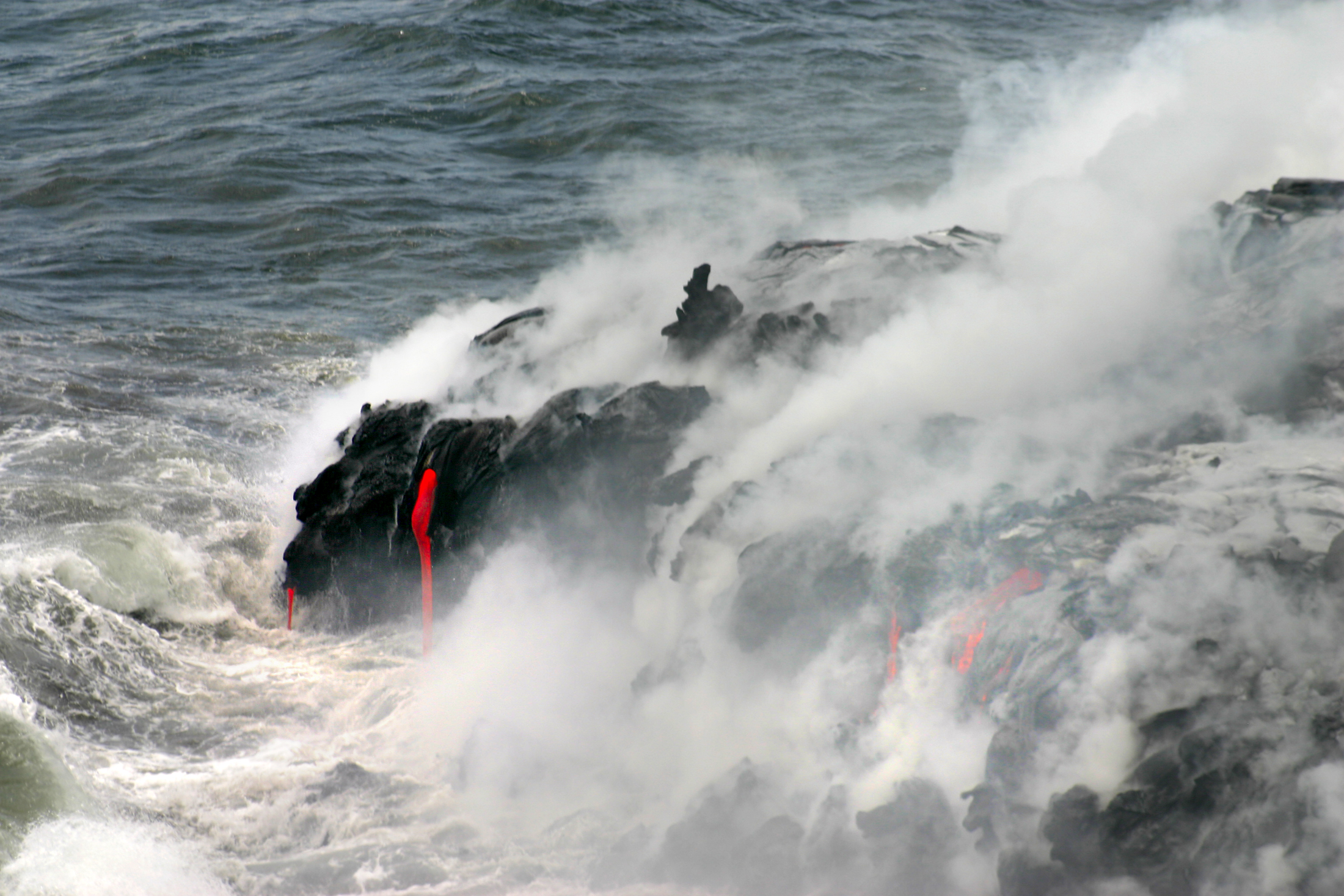
Pahoehoe lava enters the Pacific at Hawaii Volcanoes National Park, the Big Island of Hawaii

Hyaloclastite is a volcanoclastic accumulation or breccia consisting of glass (from the Greek hyalus) fragments (clasts) formed by quench fragmentation of lava flow surfaces during submarine or subglacial extrusion. It occurs as thin margins on the lava flow surfaces and between pillow lavas as well as in thicker deposits, more commonly associated with explosive, volatile-rich eruptions as well as steeper topography. Hyaloclastites form during volcanic eruptions under water, under ice or where subaerial flows reach the sea or other bodies of water. It commonly has the appearance of angular flat fragments sized between a millimeter to few centimeters. The fragmentation occurs by the force of the volcanic explosion, or by thermal shock and spallation during rapid cooling.

Several mineraloids are found in hyaloclastite masses. Sideromelane is a basalt glass rapidly quenched in water. It is transparent and pure, lacking the iron oxide crystals dispersed in the more commonly occurring tachylite. Fragments of these glasses are usually surrounded by a yellow waxy layer of palagonite, formed by reaction of sideromelane with water.

Hyaloclastite ridges, formed by subglacial eruptions during the last glacial period, are a prominent landscape feature of Iceland and the Canadian province of British Columbia. Hyaloclastite is usually found at subglacial volcanoes, such as tuyas, which is a type of distinctive, flat-topped, steep-sided volcano formed when lava erupts through a thick glacier or ice sheet.

In lava deltas, hyaloclastites form the main constituent of foresets formed ahead of the expanding delta. The foresets fill in the seabed topography, eventually building up to sea level, allowing the subaerial flow to move forwards until it reaches the sea again.

== See also ==
- Hyalotuff
