= Pillow lava =

Lava formed due to subaqueous extrusion

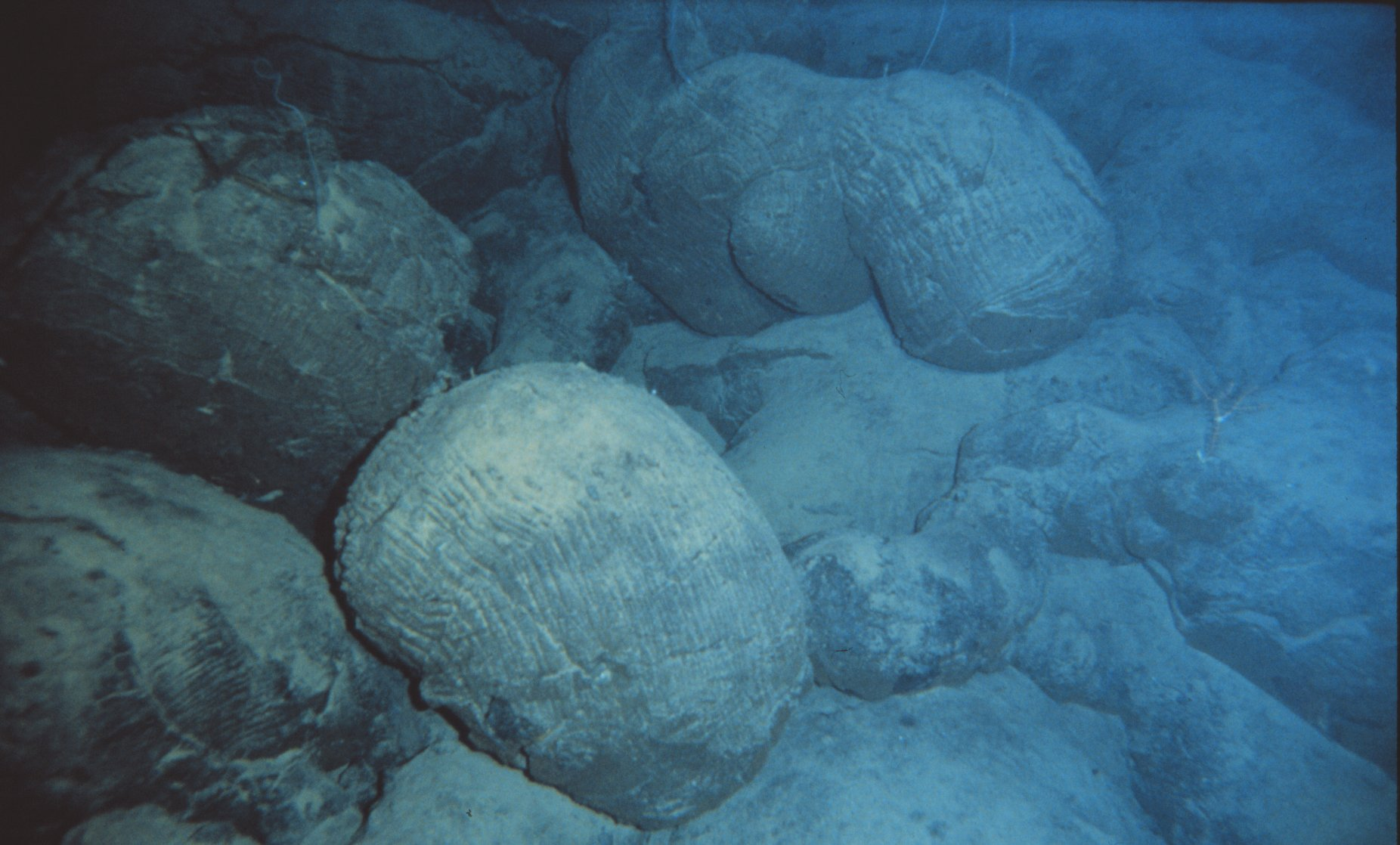
Pillow lava on the ocean floor of Hawaii

Pillow lavas are lavas that contain characteristic pillow-shaped structures that are attributed to the extrusion of the lava underwater, or subaqueous extrusion. Pillow lavas in volcanic rock are characterized by thick sequences of discontinuous pillow-shaped masses, commonly up to one meter in diameter. They form the upper part of Layer 2 of normal oceanic crust.

== Composition ==
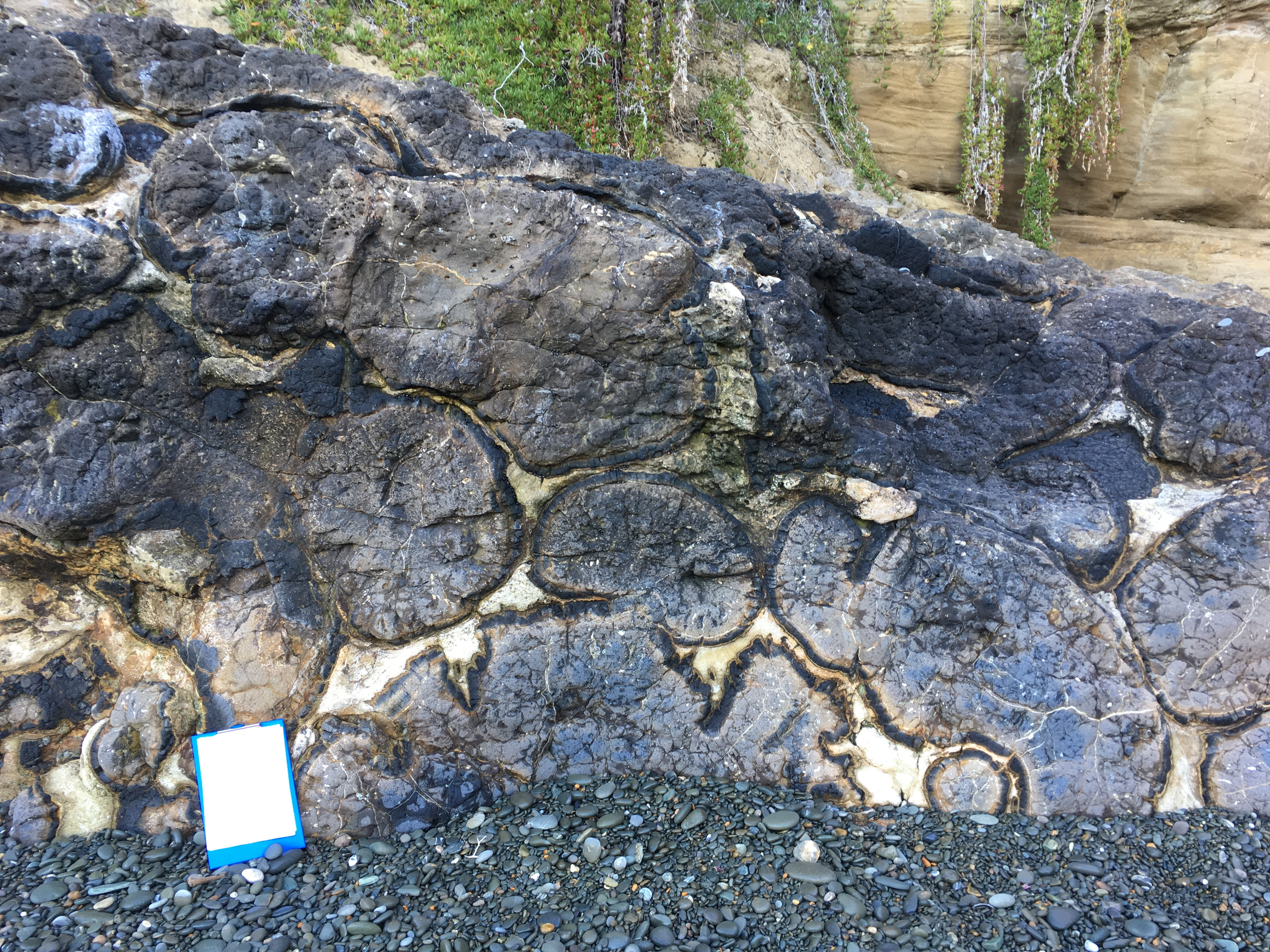
Pillow lava at Boatman's Harbour. Oamaru, New Zealand.

Pillow lavas are commonly of basaltic composition, although pillows formed of komatiite, picrite, boninite, basaltic andesite, andesite, dacite or even rhyolite are known. In general, the more felsic the composition (richer in silica - resulting in an Intermediate composition), the larger the pillows, due to the increase in viscosity of the erupting lava.

== Occurrence ==
They occur wherever lava is extruded underwater, such as along marine hotspot volcano chains and the constructive plate boundaries of mid-ocean ridges. As new oceanic crust is formed, thick sequences of pillow lavas are erupted at the spreading center fed by dykes from the underlying magma chamber. Pillow lavas and the related sheeted dyke complexes form part of a classic ophiolite sequence (when a segment of oceanic crust is thrust over the continental crust, thus exposing the oceanic segment above sea level).

The presence of pillow lavas in the oldest preserved volcanic sequences on the planet, the Isua and Barberton greenstone belts, confirms the presence of large bodies of water on the Earth's surface early in the Archean Eon. Pillow lavas are used generally to confirm subaqueous volcanism in metamorphic belts.

Pillow lavas are also found associated with some subglacial volcanoes at an early stage of an eruption.

== Formation ==
They are created when magma reaches the surface but, as there is a large difference in temperature between the lava and the water, the surface of the emergent tongue cools very quickly, forming a skin. The tongue continues to lengthen and inflate with more lava, forming a lobe, until the pressure of the magma becomes sufficient to rupture the skin and start the formation of a new eruption point nearer the vent. This process produces a series of interconnecting lobate shapes that are pillow-like in cross-section. The skin cools much faster than the inside of the pillow, so it is very fine-grained, with a glassy texture. The magma inside the pillow cools slowly, so it is slightly coarser-grained than the skin, but it is still classified as fine grained.

== Use as a way-up criterion ==
Pillow lavas can be used as a way-up indicator in geology; that is, study of their shape reveals the attitude, or position, in which they were originally formed. Pillow lava shows it is still in its original orientation when:

1. Vesicles are found towards the top of a pillow (because the gas trapped as part of the rock is less dense than its solid surroundings).
2. The pillow structures show a convex (rounded) upper surface.
3. The pillows might have a tapered base downwards, as they may have molded themselves to any underlying pillows during their formation.

== Gallery ==
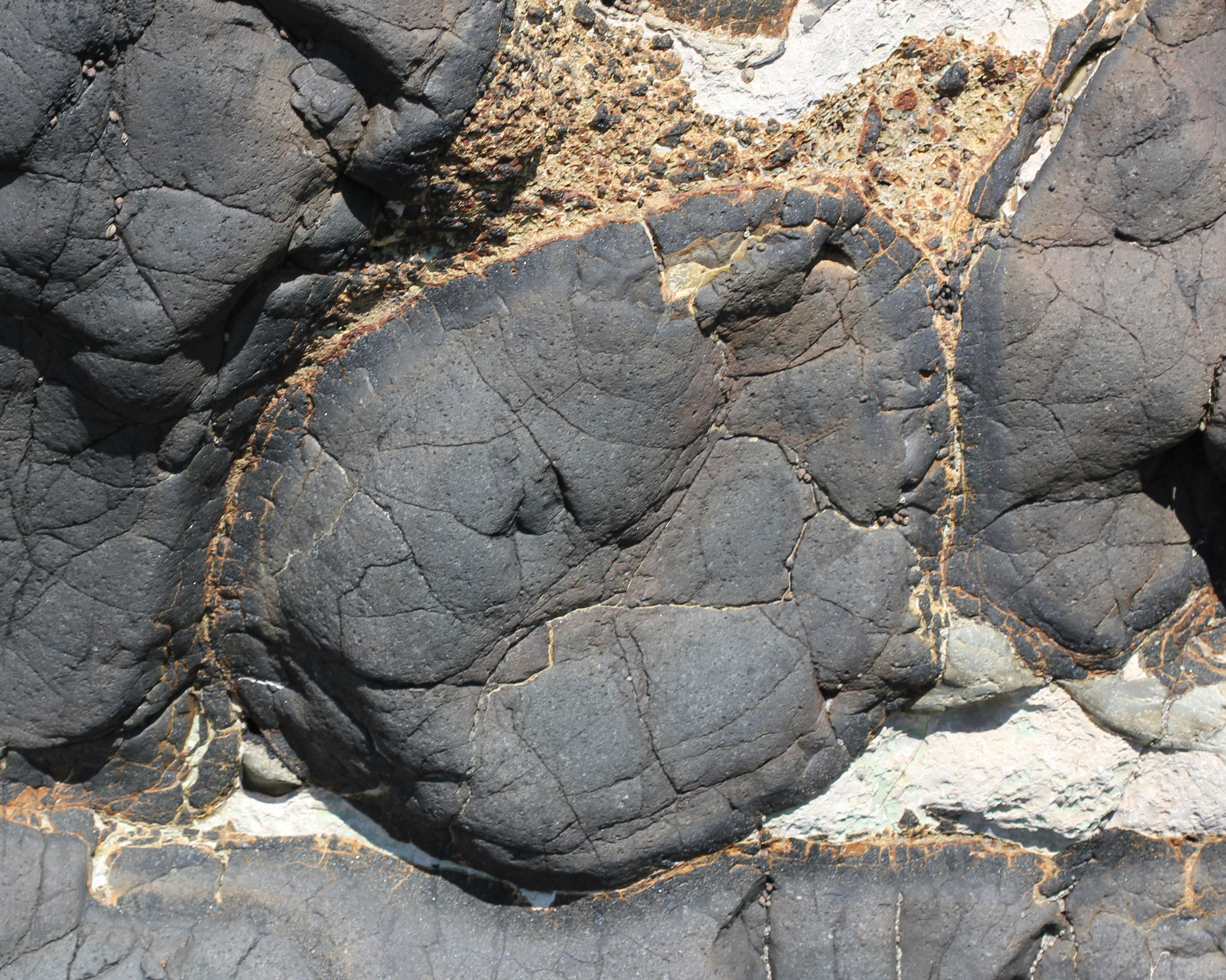
Pillow lava near Oamaru, New Zealand

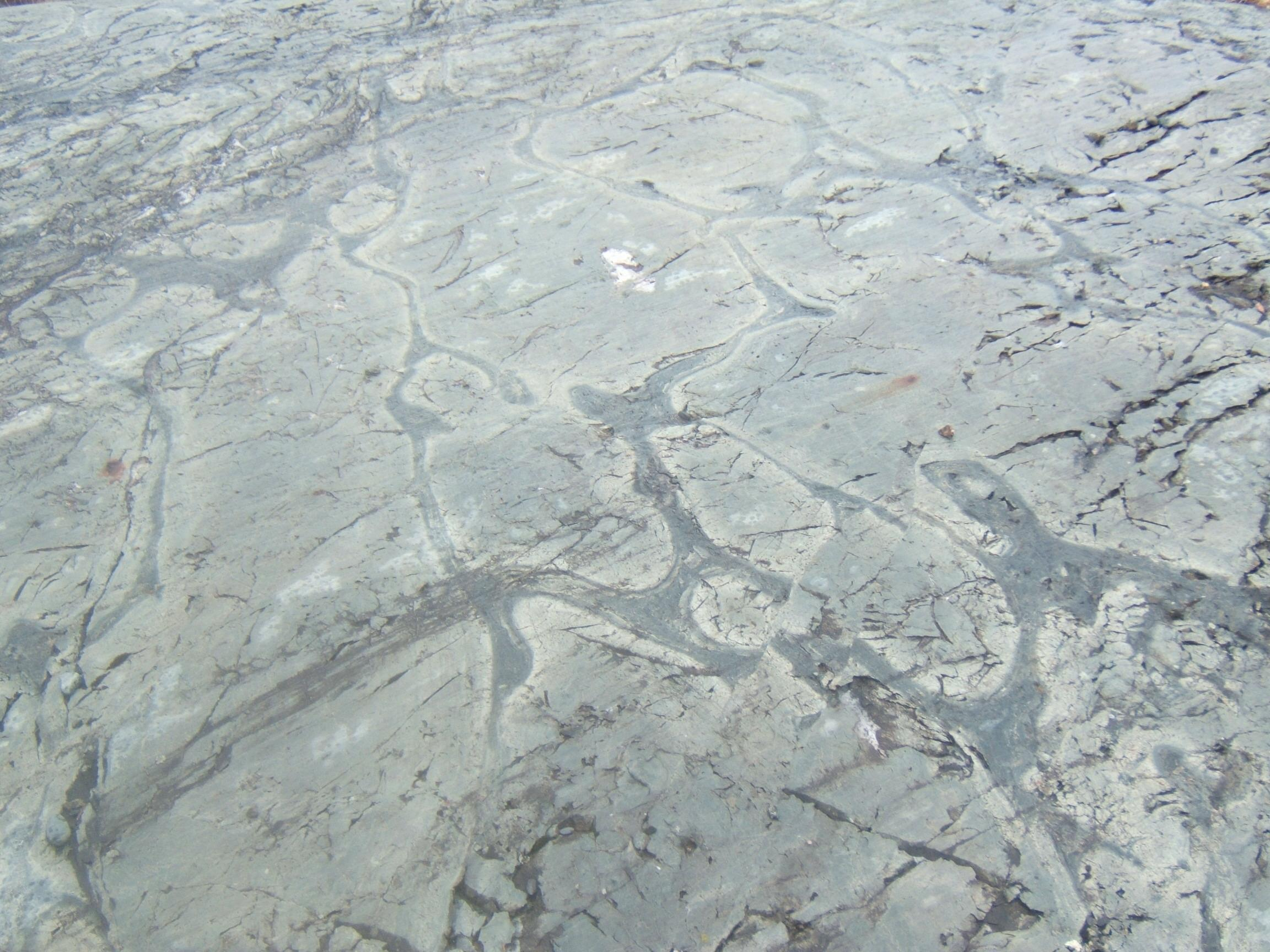
Weathered Archean pillow lava in the Temagami Greenstone Belt of the Canadian Shield

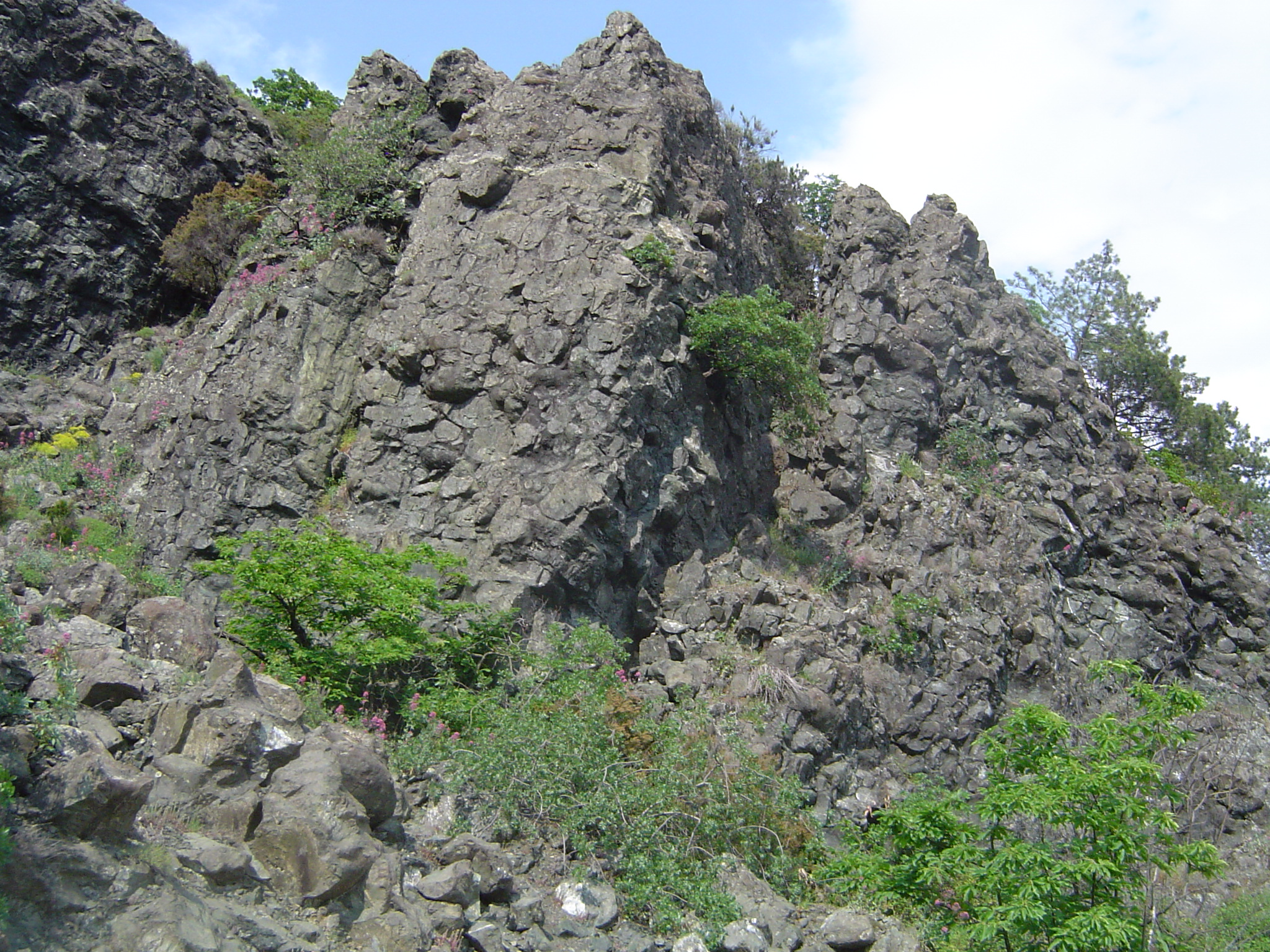
Pillow lava formations from an ophiolite sequence, Northern Apennines, Italy

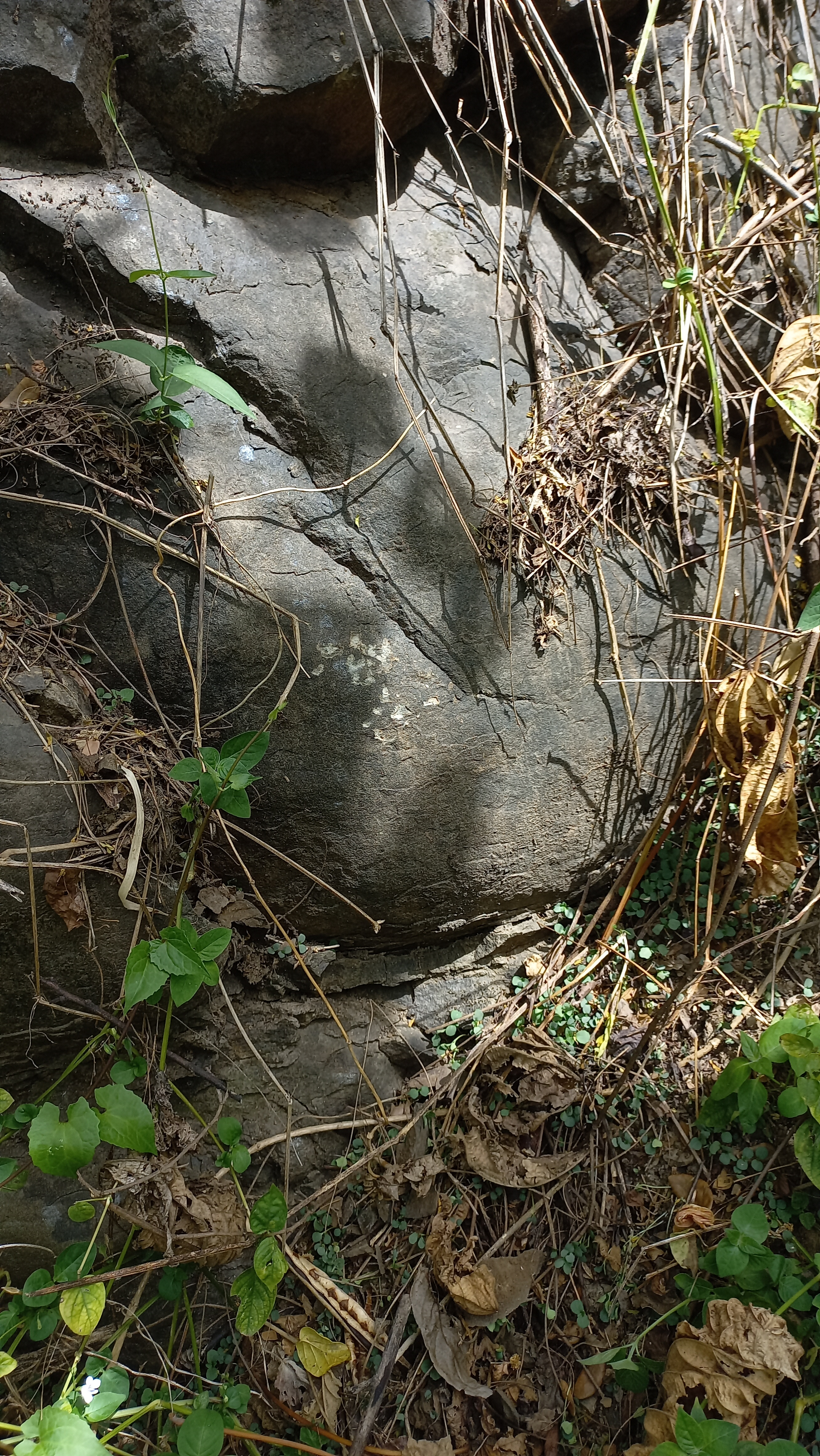
Pillow basalt from Baras, Rizal Province, Philippines

== See also ==
- Pillow basalt
- Spilite, a fine-grained igneous rock, resulting particularly from the alteration of oceanic basalt
