= Tuya Lake =

Lake in British Columbia, Canada

- Location within British Columbia
- Location: British Columbia
- Coordinates: 59°04′00″N 130°35′00″W
- Type: oligotrophic
- Primary inflows: Butte Creek, Tuya River
- Primary outflows: Tuya River
- Basin countries: Canada
- Max. length: 13 km (8.1 mi)
- Max. width: 3 km (1.9 mi)
- Average depth: 20 m (66 ft)
- Max. depth: 54 m (177 ft)
- Surface elevation: 1,117 m (3,665 ft)

Tuya Lake, located in northwestern British Columbia, Canada, presumably derives its name from the presence of nearby steep-sided, flat-topped volcanoes, known as tuyas. The lake is situated just south of Tuya Butte at a latitude of about 59 degrees North and a longitude of about 131 degrees West.

== Fish species ==
The fish species that are native to Tuya Lake include Arctic grayling (Thymalus arcticus), bull trout (Salvelinus confluentus), longnose sucker (Catostomus catostomus), burbot (Lota lota), prickly sculpin (Cottus asper), and slimy sculpin (Cottus cognatus). While it is not a native species, sockeye salmon (Oncorhynchus nerka) can also be found in Tuya Lake.

=== Impact of the Pacific Salmon Treaty ===
The Pacific Salmon Treaty was created in 1985 and it is an agreement between the United States and Canada aimed at conserving salmon populations and maintaining equity in the area of salmon fishing. As a part of this treaty, the amount of sockeye salmon was increased by 100,000 in the Stikine Water Shed, which Tuya Lake is a part of.

== Surrounding areas ==
Much of the area surrounding Tuya Lake consists of undeveloped wilderness. The human activity around Tuya Lake is limited mainly to hunting and other outdoor activities. Common animals that attract hunters include caribou, grizzly bear, moose, mountain goat, black bear, wolf, and wolverine. The types of waterfowl in the area include northern pintail, lesser scaup, and red-throated loon.

=== Landforms and vegetation ===
The Tuya Lake region is in close proximity to many mountains, plateaus, tuyas, and valleys. In lowland areas, wetlands are common. Forests of white spruce, willow, birch, and fir are present.

== Tributaries ==
Tuya Lake empties into Tuya River which flows in a South or Southwest direction until it enters the Stikine River. It is fed by numerous tributaries, most notably Butte Creek, as well as several others that are not named.

== See also ==
- List of lakes of British Columbia
