= Taku River/T'aḵú Téiú' Conservancy =

- IUCN category II (national park)
- Location within British Columbia
- Location: Stikine Region, British Columbia, Canada
- Nearest city: Juneau
- Coordinates: 58°46′48″N 133°16′59″W
- Area: 80,465 ha (310.68 sq mi)
- Designation: Conservancy
- Established: June 22, 2012
- Governing body: BC Parks, Taku River Tlingit First Nation

Taku River/T'aḵú Téiú' Conservancy is a conservancy located in the Stikine Region of British Columbia, Canada. It was established on June 22, 2012, as a result of the Wóoshtin Wudidaa Atlin Taku Land Use Plan and Taku River Tlingit First Nation Strategic Engagement Agreement. The conservancy protects a large region of pristine wilderness along the Taku River from its confluence with the Nakina and Inklin Rivers to the Canada–United States border] with Alaska.

== Name origin ==
The Tlingit name T'aḵú Téiú' means “Heart of the Taku”.

== Geography ==
Taku River Conservancy covers 80,465 ha (198,830 acres) of pristine wilderness along the entire length of the Taku River Valley, excluding a large area around the unincorporated locality of Tulsequah. The conservancy borders the Nakina – Inklin Rivers/Yáwu Yaa Conservancy to the northeast and Tongass National Forest of Alaska to the southwest.

Bishop Falls, one of the highest waterfalls in Canada, is a prominent feature along the southeastern slope valley.

The conservancy also protects King Salmon Lake, a small lake located at the headwaters of King Salmon Creek. The creek the longest tributary of the Taku River protected by the conservancy.

== See also ==
- Atlin/Áa Tlein Téix'i Provincial Park
