= Michael Eugene Oros =

Canadian fugitive and criminal

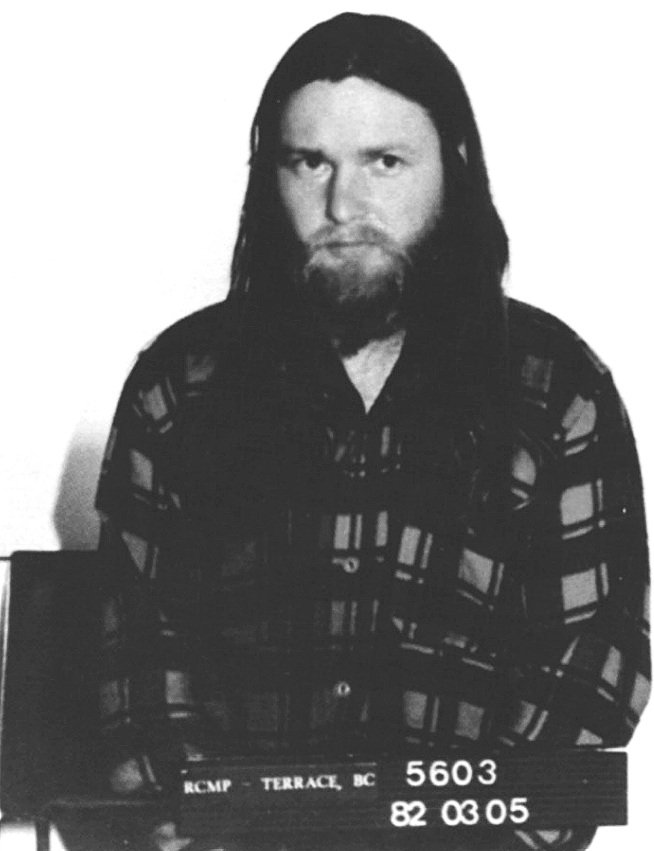
- Mugshot taken from his initial arrest while at the Terrace RCMP detachment
- Born: 1952 (Note: one source says 1951); Portland, Oregon, USA
- Died: March 19, 1985; Teslin Lake, British Columbia, Canada
- Cause of death: Gunshot
- Other names: Sheslay Free Mike, Crazy Mike, The Other Mad Trapper
- Time at large: 1979-1982; March 18–19, 1985

Details
- Killed: 2
- Weapon: .303 rifle (Note: sources vary on what calibre and type of rifle he used to kill Lischy, including .22 calibre, .44 calibre, .303 calibre, and .38 calibre. The rifle he used in the ambush against the RCMP was a .303 calibre.)

Michael Eugene Oros (1952-1985), better known by the name Sheslay Free Mike was a murderer and bushman known for the murders of Gunther Lischy and Cpl. Michael Buday in 1982 and 1985. He has been called "one of the most infamous and mysterious criminals to ever roam the north country" and was the subject of the book Descent into Madness by author Vernon Frolick. The murder of Cpl. Michael Buday led to changes in communication and transportation of RCMP Emergency Response Teams. Many newspapers drew comparisons between Michael Oros and the Mad Trapper of Rat River, who Oros was said to have idolized.

== Early life ==
Michael Oros was born in 1952 in Portland, Oregon to 39 year old single mother Margaret Oros who worked in the field of Chemistry and Geology. They moved often for jobs, leaving Oregon for North Dakota before settling down in Lawrence, Kansas where Margaret got a job at the Kansas Geological Survey. Lawrence would be where Michael spent the majority of his childhood. Michael was described as a shy and quiet boy, who was often picked on in school. He was a good student, but at age 15 his grades started dropping and he struggled to complete Grade 10. Soon after, his mother had him involuntarily committed to a psychiatric hospital after he had some sort of nervous fit. Psychiatrists at the ward gave no formal diagnosis, but said that he suffered from paranoid delusions, and he believed that people were poisoning him. When he was released from the psych ward he was sent to a guest ranch by his mother where he worked with horses. Michael was deeply affected by the ongoing Vietnam War, and the student protests, and began to develop deeply anti-government views. When he left the ranch at 19, he travelled to a commune in New Mexico, where he developed a heroin addiction. In 1971, he travelled to Fairbanks, Alaska where he lived with hippies, and purchased his first gun. In 1972, he immigrated to Canada, possibly to draft dodge, and he ended up in the Stikine Region of northwestern British Columbia.

== Life in Canada ==
Oros moved in to an abandoned cabin on the banks of the Sheslay River, 50 kilometres (31 mi) from the community of Telegraph Creek. (Note: one source says that he built the cabin, however Oros's pattern of behaviour makes this very unlikely) It was here that he gave himself the name Sheslay Free Mike, which he would be known as by locals up until his death. Michael believed that the region belonged to him, and he would raid any cabin or camp he found, stealing food as well as any other valuable items, often marking cabins and trees with various symbols, including Greek crosses, swastikas, and his name. This, along with the notes he left detailing his anti-government beliefs including that government agents were flying over the wilderness in planes spraying drugs to castrate him, quickly made him infamous in the local community. His looting of camps and cabins made him unpopular, and he was driven out of the area by people from Telegraph Creek. From here he moved to the area around Dease Lake. He moved frequently, and often travelled great distances, being seen as far south as the town of Smithers.

=== Crimes and arrest (1979-1982) ===
==== Conflicts with the Alaska Department of Fish and Game ====
During his time in the bush, he encountered the Alaska Department of Fish and Game, who were conducting research led by Paul Kisser on fish in the region annually from April to October. In 1979, upon returning to their research camp on the Nakina River, the biologists found their camp ransacked and their river boat stolen. Kisser, discovering a note at the site, and aware of Oros's reputation, suspected him in the theft and reported it to the RCMP. The RCMP, who already suspected him in many other thefts, put a warrant out for Oros's arrest. However, due to his lack of known permanent residence and his knowledge of the surrounding area, searches proved unsuccessful in locating him. A few months later during the fall, Kisser was working on the Taku River, when a man knocked on his cabin's door during the night. When Kisser's wife responded from inside the cabin, the man demanded to be let inside, eventually banging on the door angrily until they phoned the police. The next day when an Alaska State Trooper arrived, all that was found was semen left on the window next to the door. When shown a photo of Oros, Kisser's wife said that it was likely him.

==== Murder of Gunther Lischy ====
On July 31, 1981, pilot Dave Wiebe was chartered by a trapper known as Gunther Hans Lischy to drop him off on Hutsigola Lake, with a return flight 41 days later. Lischy was a German immigrant, who after fighting for the Nazis during WWII and surviving a prison camp in Siberia, became disillusioned with society and travelled to Canada in 1953 to live off the grid, living in Northern British Columbia for 30 years. Lischy planned to build a cabin on Hutsigola Lake and had the building materials and food carried in by plane. This cabin was only 100 metres (330 ft) from a cabin being occupied by Michael Oros. Whether Lischy was friends with Oros, didn't know he had a cabin there, or was planning to take over Oros's illegal trap lines isn't clear. Oros was known to Lischy, as proven by a photo of Oros taken by Lischy, one of three photos found taped in Lischy's cabin, the other two being of his friends. On September 10, pilot Dave Wiebe returned to Hutsigola Lake in his plane, but did not see Lischy, finding his cabin unfinished, with building materials and food still remaining. Wiebe, who had been chartered by Lischy many times before, knew this was unusual for Lischy, who was typically a very fast worker, and was always on time for being picked up. While waiting for Lischy, Wiebe was approached instead by Oros, wearing Lischy's clothes. When asked if he'd seen Lischy, Oros told Wiebe that he hadn't and doesn't know who Lischy is. Upon returning, Wiebe reported Lischy missing to the RCMP. When the RCMP flew to the lake with Wiebe, neither Lischy nor Oros were found, and Lischy's building material and food were missing as well. A search lasting one week was unsuccessful in locating Oros but resulted in discovering Oros's cabin and a hiding spot where Oros kept his journals. The journals spoke of the government poisoning the food and water, and also said that the Canadian police were the Nazis and that they plan to have people imprisoned in cities. In August 1985, RCMP officers discovered Lischy's skeletonized body near the shore of Hutsigola Lake, being scavenged on by animals. The body was wrapped in plastic, and was believed to have been buried underwater in the wet sand of Hutsigola Lake, explaining why it wasn't initially found. Lischy was shot in the back. In August 1986, a coroner's jury concluded the Oros had killed Gunther.

==== Arrest and trial ====
In March 1982, RCMP returned to the lake to arrest Michael, who had travelled back to his cabin for the winter. Two plainclothes officers arrested Michael at the door of his cabin, being watched by a hidden sharpshooter. Inside the cabin, items belonging to Gunther were found including Gunther's .357 Magnum revolver, camera, and building material. Oros was flown to the RCMP detachment in Atlin, where he was charged with the theft of the boat from 1979. He was then flown to the RCMP detachment in Terrace, where an undercover officer posed as a criminal to try to get Oros to admit to Lischy's murder, but this was unsuccessful in getting Oros to admit anything other than that he did know Lischy. After a brief hearing, Oros was ordered to be sent to Vancouver for a psychiatric evaluation, much to his dismay. He became very uncooperative, spitting in the face of an officer and destroying his cell, having to be physically restrained by Cpl. Michael Buday. During his psychiatric evaluation in Vancouver, Oros was diagnosed with Paranoid schizophrenia, but was found fit to stand trial. In August 1982, the judge acquitted him of all charges and he was released.

=== Life after jail ===
Upon released, Oros discovered that the RCMP had destroyed two of his dogs upon recommendation from Conservation officers. This, along with being arrested, enraged him and made him hate the Canadian police even more. After being acquitted, Michael stayed in the Terrace area for a while, getting in trouble for threatening a police officer, but avoiding jail. In 1983, Oros travelled to Eastern Canada for unknown reasons, but soon returned to the Stikine area, continuing his life of raiding cabins and illegal trapping. During this time, his journals spoke of elite paratroopers being dropped into the forest to hunt and kill him because they didn't like his ideals and length of hair. He also wrote stories where he saved young girls from society. He was reported to chase off hunters at gun point, and walk into campsites at night and speak of how the CIA was trying to poison him.

=== Teslin Lake incident ===
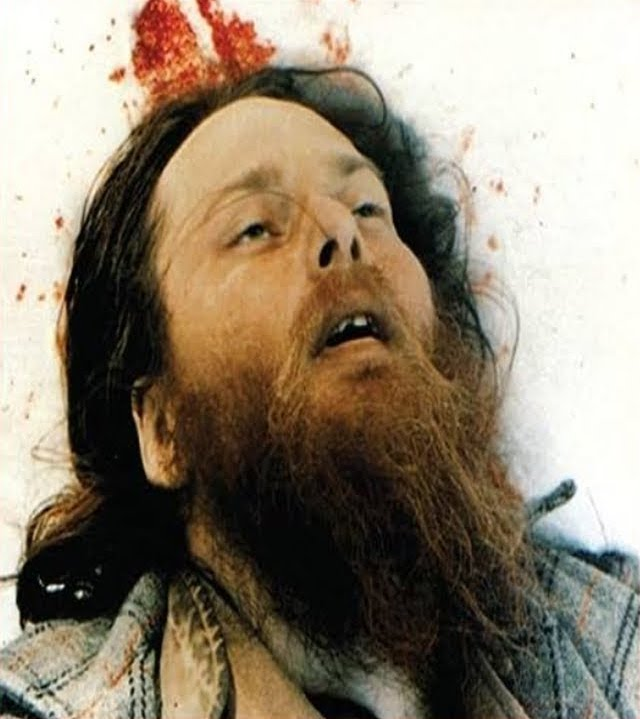
RCMP photograph of the deceased Michael Oros

On March 17, 1985, Frank and Eileen Hase travelled on snowmobile from Whitehorse to their remote cabin on Teslin Lake near the Yukon-British Columbia border, after having been away since the fall. When they reached their cabin they discovered it ransacked, with their fishing gear, wedding rings, guns, and canoe all gone, and their shed having been used to butcher a moose. The missing items were estimated to be worth $7000. In the distance, Frank Hase spotted Michael Oros walking along the shore. The Hase's travelled to Teslin to report the theft to the RCMP. A reconnaissance plane was sent by the Yukon RCMP to search for Oros, who upon seeing the plane fired at it, missing. The Yukon RCMP then contacted the Northern BC Emergency Response Team, who sent 13 officers from the Terrace and Prince Rupert detachments to Whitehorse to plan their next course of action. The next day on March 19, the team travelled to the Village of Teslin to prepare for the helicopters. A reconnaissance plane found Oros camped on Big Island, an island in Teslin Lake, and a plan was formed to drop two teams on either end of the island to hopefully surround Oros before he could flee into the treeline. However, due to equipment issues and radio transmission problems, the helicopters were delayed, and when the team arrived at Oros's location at 11:00 AM, he had already moved, but the plan was executed anyways. Set up to the south of the island was Cpl. Michael Buday with his police dog Trooper, Cst. Garry Rodgers, and Cst. Paul Hougan. Cpl. Buday and Cst. Rodgers were armed with M16 rifles while Cst. Hougan was armed with a long-range sniper rifle. They spotted Oros about 500 metres (1,600 ft) north carrying his sled when he appeared to see them. He then disappeared into the treeline before returning with a rifle and then disappearing again. He was spotted through the trees twice, each time being closer before disappearing. 10 minutes later Oros fatally shot Cpl. Buday in the back of his neck, before reloading and pointing at Cst. Rodgers who then shot Oros once in the forehead, killing him. It was later found that Oros had already pulled the trigger when he was shot, and that his gun had malfunctioned and the bullet was not fired.

== Memorials and tributes ==
Cpl. Michael Buday's funeral was held in the city of Brooks, Alberta, 20 kilometres (12 mi) southwest of his hometown of Tilley. His funeral procession had RCMP officers and dog handlers from all over the country attending. A cairn was erected in memorial at the location of his murder in 1986, and a proposal was made to dedicate the small section of land featuring the cairn as a provincial park, although no progress has been made in this since 2015. Another park in Terrace was named after him in 2015 and features another memorial. A plaque on a bench outside the RCMP depot in Burnaby was unveiled in his honour in 2017.

== See also ==
- List of law enforcement officers killed in the line of duty in Canada
- Mad Trapper of Rat River
- Joseph Schwab
