= Yukon Telegraph Trail =

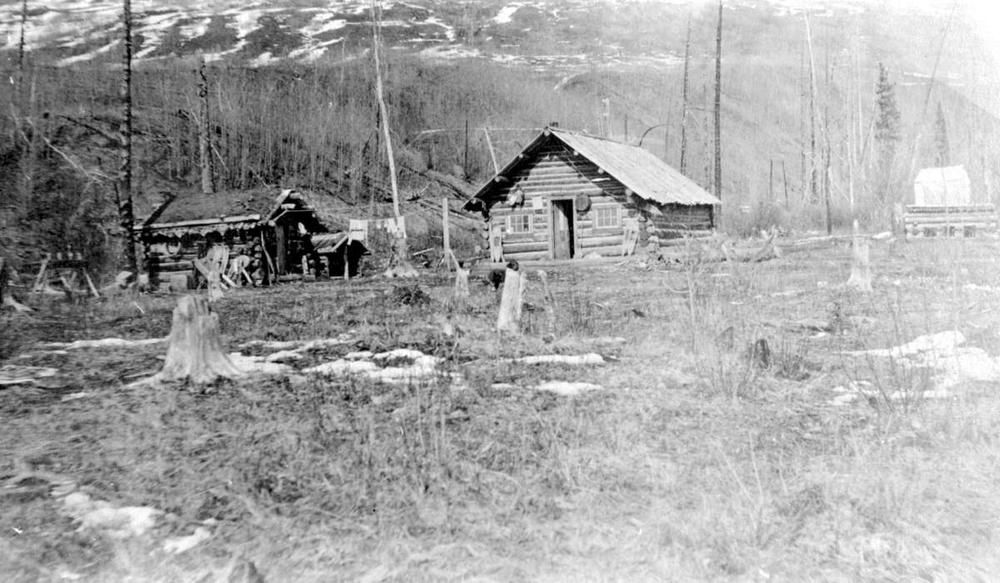
- Raspberry Station (c. 1936)

National Historic Site of Canada
- Designated: January 22, 2010
- Reference no.: 17944
- Length: 3,000 km (1,900 mi)
- Location: British Columbia and Yukon, Canada
- Established: 1866; 1901
- Began construction: 1864
- Completed: 1901

The Yukon Telegraph Trail, also known simply as the Telegraph Trail, is a historic pathway in the Canadian province of British Columbia that extends from the village of Ashcroft in the south to the community of Atlin in the north. It was used for servicing the Yukon Telegraph Line which ran from Ashcroft in the south to Dawson City, Yukon in the north. The telegraph line was constructed by the Dominion Government Telegraph Service from 1898 to 1901. It was abandoned in 1936 with the advent of radio communication. Along the length of the trail are remains of telegraph cabins, telegraph cable and other artifacts that were used during the construction of the telegraph line.

== History ==
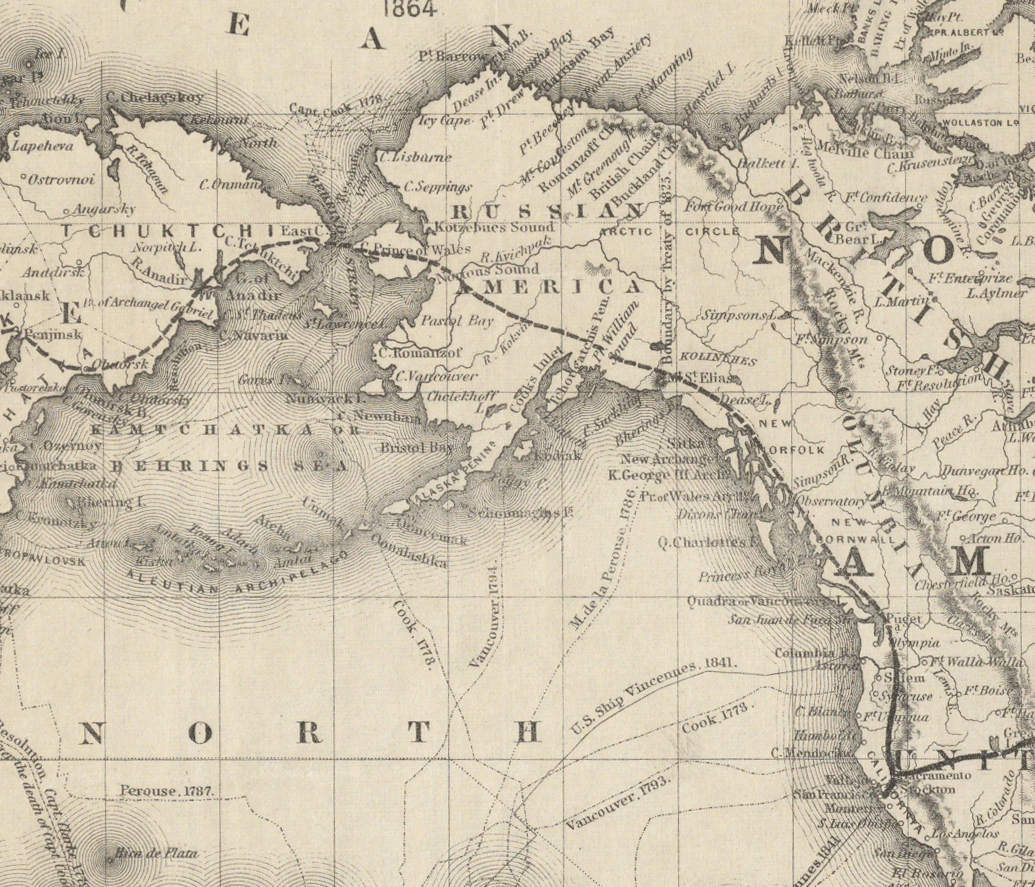
Proposed route of the Collins Overland Telegraph in North America and Russia

Perry Collins proposed a telegraph line to link San Francisco and Moscow, Russia; the line would run north into Alaska and span the Bering Strait. He negotiated contracts in the United States, Canada, and Russia starting in 1858 and was appointed managing director of the Western Union Russian Extension, later known as the Collins Overland Line, in 1864. The route was planned originally to follow the Fraser River north from Quesnel to Fort George, but the river proved to be unnavigable during spring thaws, so an alternate route was chosen, following a trail used by the Dakelh First Nations people, who also were serving as guides for the surveying crews. The line was abandoned in February 1867 after it had been built from New Westminster to Fort Stager (present-day Kispiox at the confluence of the Kispiox and Skeena Rivers, just north of Hazelton), as Cyrus W. Field's Atlantic Telegraph Company had succeeded in laying a Transatlantic telegraph cable in 1866. The telegraph station at Fort Stager was abandoned in 1869.

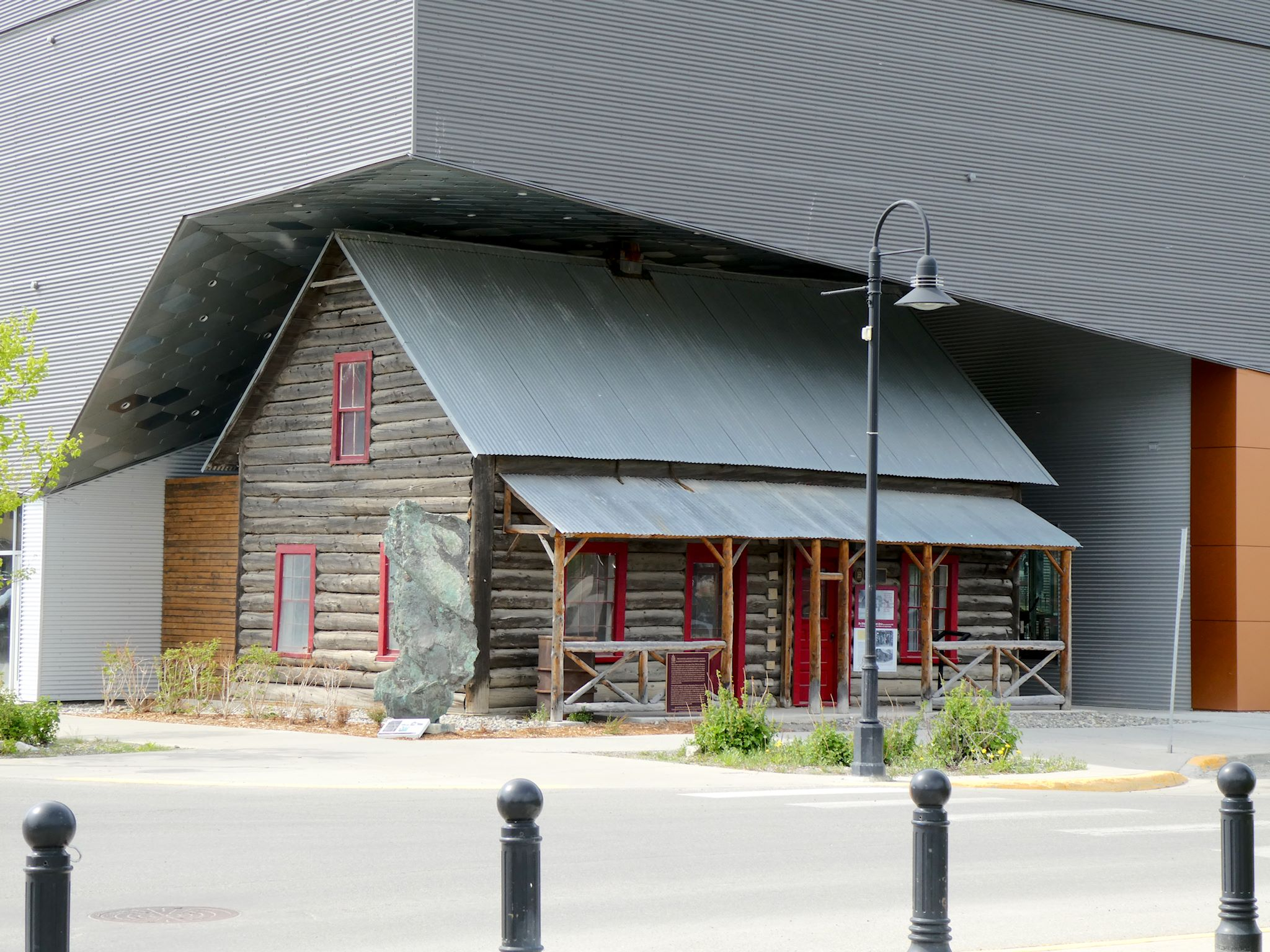
The Whitehorse telegraph office is incorporated into the MacBride Museum of Yukon History

Although the rest of the Collins Line remained active to Quesnel and even was extended east to Barkerville, the trail eclipsed its utility as the primary overland route from Quesnel for supplies and the thousands of prospectors eager to join the Omineca, Cassiar, and Klondike Gold Rushes. A new telegraph line was authorized in 1899 to improve communications with the Klondike following the migration of an estimated 100,000 prospectors; the first segment of this Yukon Telegraph Line was completed between Dawson City and Bennett at the end of September that year. A branch was added to Atlin that year, which had grown as a result of its own gold rush. The primary route for messages was through Bennett and Skagway, where they were transcribed and shipped to Victoria or Vancouver. The Bennett–Dawson segment had fourteen stations, spaced 30 to 40 mi (48 to 64 km) apart; smaller refuge cabins were spaced at 10 mi (16 km) to provide emergency shelter.

The Yukon Telegraph Line continued construction in 1900, working south from Atlin and north from Quesnel simultaneously; that year, a short extension was built from Eagle, Alaska to Dawson City, linking the remote Alaskan territory, although a project led by Billy Mitchell would move American communications to an alternate line by 1903. Work on the Atlin–Quesnel segment had to pause with the onset of snow in fall 1900, leaving what the planners estimated to be a 30–50 mi (48–80 km) gap in the line south of Telegraph Creek. Two cabins were built at the termini and it was proposed to relay messages across the gap via dogsled during the ensuing winter, but this plan was abandoned as the gap proved to be significantly larger than estimated. When the gap was closed on September 24, 1901, it was discovered to be 121 mi (195 km). There are thirteen cabins between Hazelton and Telegraph Creek, spaced approximately 20–30 mi (32–48 km) apart. From Telegraph Creek to Whitehorse, there are seven cabins, spaced 20–50 mi (32–80 km) apart.

The Yukon Telegraph operated until 1936, when it was wiped out by floods and replaced by radio communications. As the trail was used by heavily-laden animals to bring supplies north, continuing from the terminus of the Cariboo Wagon Road in Quesnel, soil compaction has continued to preserve the trail by discouraging tree growth.

== Route ==
Settlements along the Yukon Telegraph

North of Kispiox, the Telegraph Trail that likely was scouted as part of the Collins Line ran north along the Skeena River to its headwaters, then crossed into the watershed of the Stikine, following the Klappan River partially.

In Cassiar Land District, the Yukon Telegraph Trail crosses from the Stikine River watershed to the Taku River watershed between the Little Tahltan River and the Hackett River. It passes through the abandoned settlement of Sheslay at the mouth of Egnell Creek and the confluence of the Hackett and Sheslay Rivers. Continuing north it passes through Callison Ranch then follows the Koshin River to its confluence with the Nahlin River, a locality called Nahlin Crossing.

Proceeding north from Quesnel, the cabins and settlements (noted in italic text) on the Yukon Telegraph were:

- Quesnel
- Blackwater
- Bobtail Lake
- Stoney Creek
- Fraser Lake
- Burns Lake
- South Bulkley
- Tyee Lake
- Hazelton
- Cabin 1
- Cabin 2
- Cabin 3
- Cabin 4
- Cabin 5
- Cabin 6
- Cabin 7
- Cabin 8
- Cabin 9
- Echo Lake
- Iskoot
- Raspberry
- Telegraph Creek
- Shesley
- Nahlin
- Nakina
- Pike River
- Atlin

== Significance ==
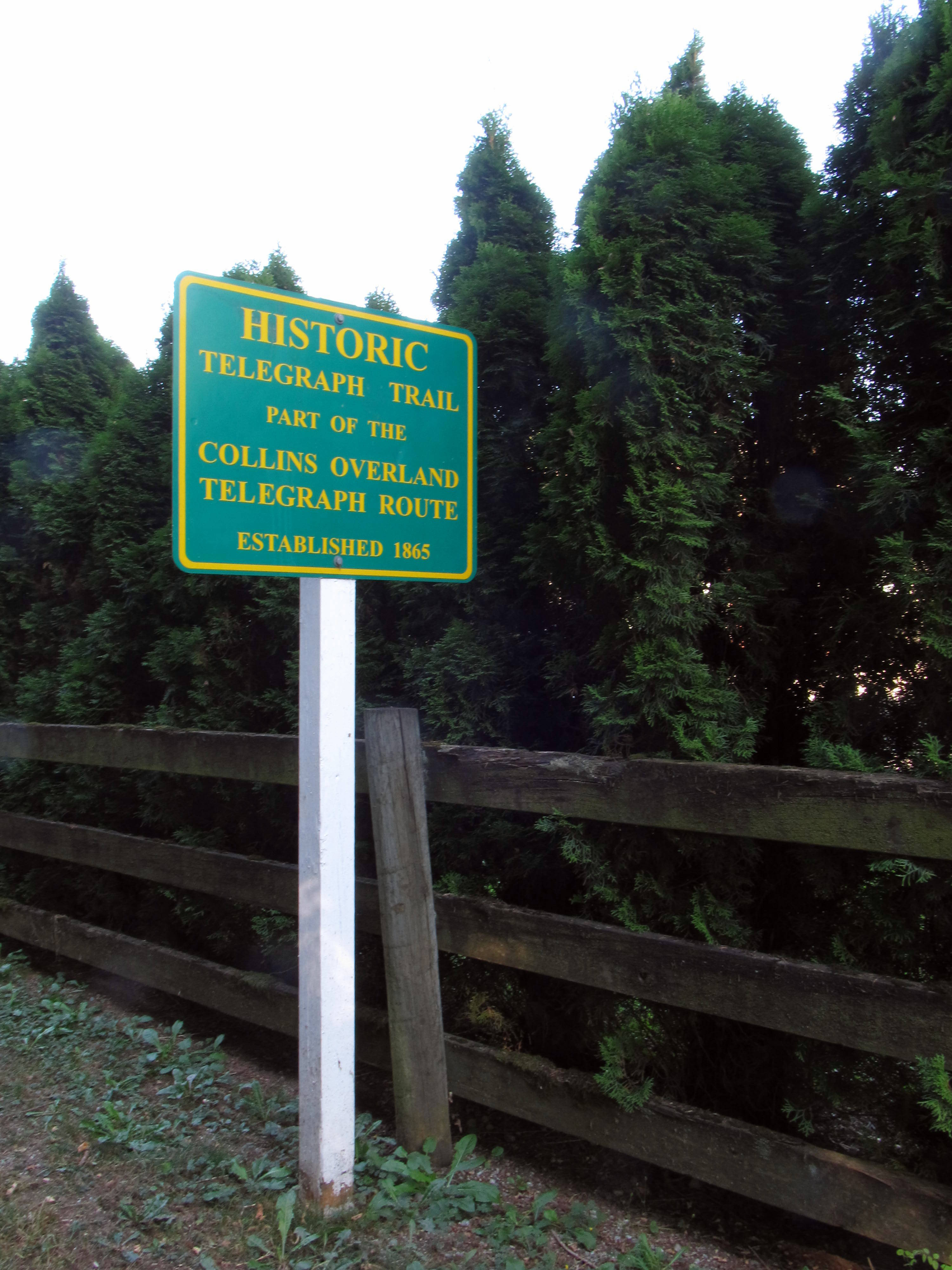
Telegraph Trail marker

The Yukon Telegraph Trail was formally recognized by the Canadian Register of Historic Places on January 22, 2010, as one of many historic sites in Canada due to its historical association with the Collins Overland and Yukon Telegraph lines. It was also recognized for its role in communications and transportation, as well as its scientific association with the changes in communications technology, its current use by guide outfitters, its cultural association with First Nations and telegraph operators, its potential as a recreational resource, and its location within the pristine natural environment of Kitimat-Stikine Regional District.
