= Blackfly Tuya =

- Location within British Columbia
- Interactive map of Blackfly Tuya

Highest point
- Elevation: 1,373 m (4,505 ft)
- Coordinates: 59°6′28.6″N 130°51′49.5″W

Geography
- Location: British Columbia, Canada

Geology
- Mountain type: Tuya
- Volcanic zone: Northern Cordilleran Volcanic Province
- Volcanic field: Tuya volcanic field
- Last eruption: Pleistocene

Blackfly Tuya is a tuya in northern British Columbia, Canada. It is one of several volcanoes in the Tuya volcanic field and is adjacent to West Vent, Volcano Vent and Grizzly Butte which comprise the West Tuya lava field. Blackfly Tuya has an elevation of 1,373 m (4,505 ft).

== See also ==
- List of volcanoes in Canada
- Volcanism of Western Canada
