= Simpson Peak (Canada) =

Mountain in British Columbia, Canada

Coordinates: 59°43′24″N 131°26′53″W

Simpson Peak 2170 m (7119 ft) is the northernmost officially-named summit in the Stikine Ranges of the Cassiar Mountains system in northernmost British Columbia, Canada. It stands on the north side of the lower reaches of the Jennings River, just east of the south end of Teslin Lake, and is to the south of Swan Lake, which is an expansion of the Swift River. The mountain is named for Scott Simpson, an early explorer in the area. The next-highest summit in the unnamed subrange of the Cassiars to the north of the Jennings River is Toozaza Peak (its name is unofficial and based on that of Toozaza Creek).
