= Hayes River (British Columbia) =

Coordinates: 59°35′33″N 132°10′55″W

The Hayes River is a river in far northern British Columbia, Canada, flowing into Teslin Lake from the west, just to the west of the entry into that lake of the Teslin River. Other rivers feeding Teslin Lake include the Jennings River and the Swift River.

== See also ==
- List of rivers of British Columbia
