= Egnell Creek =

- Mouth of Egnell Creek

Location
- Country: Canada
- Province: British Columbia
- District: Cassiar Land District

Physical characteristics
- Source: Level Mountain
  - location: Nahlin Plateau
  - coordinates: 58°21′5″N 131°32′48″W
  - elevation: 1,620 m (5,310 ft)
- Mouth: Hackett River
  - coordinates: 58°15′37″N 131°48′9″W
  - elevation: 529 m (1,736 ft)
- Length: 24 km (15 mi)
- Basin size: 121 km^{2} (47 sq mi),
- Discharge
  - average: 1.95 m^{3}/s (69 cu ft/s)

Basin features
- Topo map: NTS 104J5 Ketchum Lake

Egnell Creek is a tributary of the Hackett River in northwest part of the province of British Columbia, Canada. It flows generally southwest about 24 km (15 mi) to join the Hackett River near the Hackett's confluence with the Sheslay River, which in turn is a tributary of the Inklin River, the main southeast fork of the Taku River. Mount Egnell is located near the creek's mouth, as is the historic locality known as Egnell or Sheslay, once a telegraph station on the Yukon Telegraph Line.

Egnell Creek's watershed covers 121 km^{2} (47 sq mi), and its mean annual discharge is estimated at 1.95 m^{3}/s (69 cu ft/s). The mouth of Egnell Creek is located about 55 km (34 mi) northwest of Telegraph Creek, British Columbia, about 153 km (95 mi) east of Juneau, Alaska, and about 330 km (210 mi) southeast of Whitehorse, Yukon. Egnell Creek's watershed's land cover is classified as 46.1% shrubland, 32.4% barren, 24.5% conifer forest, 12.8% mixed forest, and small amounts of other cover.

Egnell Creek is in the traditional territory of the Tlingit Taku River Tlingit First Nation and the Tahltan people.

== Geography ==
Egnell Creek originates on the west flank of the massive Level Mountain shield volcano, near the headwaters of the Little Tahltan River and Dudidontu River, and about 15 km (9.3 mi) south of Meszah Peak, the highest peak of the Level Mountain Range, a cluster of bare peaks on the summit of Level Mountain. The creek flows southwest through Level Mountain's high and relatively barren lava plateau. After about 8 km (5.0 mi) Egnell Creek enters a steep canyon carved into the escarpment on Level Mountain's western side. Below the escarpment the landscape is dominated by coniferous forests. Egnell Creek continues southwest until it reaches the Hackett River at the former settlement of Sheslay, south of Mount Egnell and about 500 m (1,600 ft) east of the Hackett and Sheslay River confluence.

== History ==
Egnell Creek is named for Albert Egnell, a miner, fur trader, and Hudson's Bay Company (HBC) employee. In the 1880s Egnell was an employee of Rufus Sylvester, who had come to the region during the Omineca Gold Rush. In 1888 the HBC bought from Sylvester the trading post that became known as Liard Post or Lower Post, located about 265 km (165 mi) northeast of Egnell Creek. At this time Egnell joined the HBC and managed Liard Post. During the 1890s Egnell conducted various operations in northwestern British Columbia, sometimes for the HBC, sometimes independently.

Albert Egnell was prospecting in the area near Egnell Creek in the 1880s. It was probably around this time that Egnell Creek and Mount Egnell were named. The HBC built a trading post sometime before 1898 near the mouth of Egnell Creek. This post, first known as Tackoo, then Egnell or Egnell Post, was abandoned by the HBC in the late 1890s. In the early 1900s its cabin served as a repair station for the 3,100 km (1,900 mi) long Yukon Telegraph Line, which extended from Ashcroft, British Columbia to Dawson City, Yukon. Subsequently, a number of buildings and a mission house were constructed and the name changed to Sheslay. This settlement has since been abandoned. Today the Yukon Telegraph Trail follows the historic route of the Yukon Telegraph Line.

After spending one winter at Egnell Post, Albert Egnell found that there was no trade to be done in the area and the post was subsequently abandoned. Egnell died on 22 June 1900, from an accidental gun shot to his leg five days earlier. He was buried at Liard Post.

In 1891–1892, the HBC constructed a trail from the mouth of Egnell Creek, near the junction of the Sheslay and Hackett rivers to the southwestern slope of Level Mountain.

== See also ==
- List of rivers of British Columbia
