= Nahlin =

Nahlin may refer to:

- the Nahlin River in far northwestern British Columbia, Canada
- Nahlin Mountain, a mountain on the north side of the Nahlin River in far northwestern British Columbia, Canada
- Nahlin Plateau in northwestern British Columbia, Canada
- Peter Nahlin (born 1968), Swedish former speedway rider
- Nahlin, a luxury yacht owned by Sir James Dyson
