= Gabrielse Cone =

Postglacial monogenetic cinder cone

- Location within British Columbia
- Interactive map of Gabrielse Cone

Highest point
- Elevation: 1,600 m (5,200 ft)
- Coordinates: 59°25′07″N 130°23′50″W

Geography
- Location: British Columbia, Canada
- District: Cassiar Land District
- Parent range: Stikine Ranges
- Topo map: NTS 104O8 Maria Lake

Geology
- Rock age: Holocene
- Mountain type: Cinder cone
- Volcanic zone: Northern Cordilleran Volcanic Province
- Volcanic field: Tuya volcanic field
- Last eruption: Holocene

Gabrielse Cone is a remarkably fresh, clearly postglacial monogenetic cinder cone, located in the Tuya Volcanic Field in British Columbia, Canada. It is about 400 m (1,312 ft) in diameter and has a central crater about 30 m (98 ft) deep. It is Holocene in age and to its northeast appears to be breached with the remnants of a lava flow. The cone is near the headwaters of Iverson Creek.

Gabrielse Cone is named after Hu Gabrielse, a Canadian geologist who first identified the cone.

== See also ==
- List of volcanoes in Canada
- List of Northern Cordilleran volcanoes
- Volcanism of Western Canada
- Toozaza Peak
