= Swift River =

Swift River is the name of a Yukon town and several rivers:

Canada

- Swift River (Cottonwood River), British Columbia
- Swift River (Teslin Lake), British Columbia

Jamaica

- Swift River (Jamaica)

New Zealand

- Swift River, New Zealand

United Kingdom

- River Swift, a tributary of the River Avon (Warwickshire)

United States

- Swift River (Alaska)
- Swift River (Bearcamp River), a tributary of the Bearcamp River, New Hampshire
- Swift River (Maine), a tributary of the Androscoggin River
- Swift River (Minnesota)
- Swift River (Saco River), a tributary of the Saco River, New Hampshire
- Swift River (Ware River), a tributary of the Ware River, Massachusetts
- Swift River (Westfield River), a tributary of the Westfield River, Massachusetts

== Other ==
- SwiftRiver (software)
