= Lost Creek (Koshin River tributary) =

- Mouth of Lost Creek

Location
- Country: Canada
- Province: British Columbia
- District: Cassiar Land District

Physical characteristics
- Source: Level Mountain
  - location: Nahlin Plateau
  - coordinates: 58°33′8″N 131°24′55″W
  - elevation: 1,687 m (5,535 ft)
- Mouth: Koshin River
  - coordinates: 58°39′53″N 131°42′11″W
  - elevation: 937 m (3,074 ft)
- Length: 26 km (16 mi)
- Basin size: 70.0 km^{2} (27.0 sq mi),
- Discharge
  - average: 1.07 m^{3}/s (38 cu ft/s)

Basin features
- Topo map: NTS 104J12 Dudidontu River; NTS 104J11 Granite Lake

Lost Creek is a tributary of the Koshin River in northwest part of the province of British Columbia, Canada. It flows generally northwest for roughly 26 km (16 mi) to join the Koshin River just north of Hatin Lake, and about 4 km (2.5 mi) north of Callison Ranch. Lost Creek's watershed covers 70.0 km^{2} (27.0 sq mi), and its mean annual discharge is estimated at 1.07 m^{3}/s (38 cu ft/s). The mouth of Lost Creek is located about 90 km (56 mi) north of Telegraph Creek, British Columbia, about 102 km (63 mi) west of Dease Lake, British Columbia, and about 163 km (101 mi) east of Juneau, Alaska. Lost Creek's watershed's land cover is classified as 46.3% shrubland, 31.5% conifer forest, 12.2% barren, and small amounts of other cover.

Lost Creek is in the traditional territory of the Tlingit Taku River Tlingit First Nation and the Tahltan First Nation, of the Tahltan people.

== Geography ==
Lost Creek originates on the north side of the massive Level Mountain shield volcano, near the headwaters of Kaha Creek and Matsatu Creek, about 8 km (5.0 mi) north of Meszah Peak, the highest peak of the Level Mountain Range, a cluster of bare peaks on the summit of Level Mountain. The creek flows north and northwest, first through Level Mountain's high and relatively barren lava plateau, then through rugged forested terrain. In its final 2 km (1.2 mi) Lost Creek enters the Koshin River's floodplain. It empties into the Koshin River in the wetlands along the river north of Hatin Lake. The historic Yukon Telegraph Trail, following the Koshin River, crosses Lost Creek near its mouth.

== See also ==
- List of rivers of British Columbia
