= Hackett River =

- Mouth of Hackett River

Location
- Country: Canada
- Province: British Columbia
- District: Cassiar Land District

Physical characteristics
- Source: Kennicott Lake
  - location: Nahlin Plateau
  - coordinates: 58°10′26″N 131°33′8″W
  - elevation: 620 m (2,030 ft)
- Mouth: Sheslay River
  - coordinates: 58°15′50″N 131°48′44″W
  - elevation: 532 m (1,745 ft)
- Length: 33 km (21 mi)
- Basin size: 528 km^{2} (204 sq mi),
- Discharge
  - average: 7.28 m^{3}/s (257 cu ft/s)

Basin features
- Topo maps: NTS 104J4 Kennicott Lake; NTS 104J5 Ketchum Lake

The Hackett River is a tributary of the Sheslay River in northwest part of the province of British Columbia, Canada. It flows generally northwest about 33 km (21 mi), through two lakes, a wetland, and a gorge, to join the Sheslay River, which in turn is a tributary of the Inklin River, the main southeast fork of the Taku River.

The Hackett River's watershed covers 528 km^{2} (204 sq mi), and its estimated mean annual discharge is 7.28 m^{3}/s (257 cu ft/s). The mouth of the Hackett River is located about 55 km (34 mi) northwest of Telegraph Creek, British Columbia, about 150 km (93 mi) east of Juneau, Alaska, and about 330 km (210 mi) southeast of Whitehorse, Yukon. The Hackett River's watershed's land cover is classified as 35.2% conifer forest, 30.5% shrubland, 11.8% mixed forest, 11.6% barren, 5.4% herbaceous, and small amounts of other cover.

The Hackett River is in the traditional territory of the Tahltan people.

== Geography ==
The Hackett River originates with several small streams flowing into Kennicott Lake, on the south side of Level Mountain on the Nahlin Plateau. From its source, near Hyland Ranch, the river flows northwest through the Tahltan Highland for about 33 km (21 mi). It first flows to Hatchau Lake, then through the Salmon Creek 3 Indian reserve, of the Tahltan First Nation, part of the Tahltan people.

Continuing northwest between Level Mountain and Kaketsa Mountain, the Hackett River flows through a wetland then through a gorge. Along the way it is joined by Stone Creek, Copper Creek, Pyrrhotite Creek, and Egnell Creek, before joining the Sheslay River. The Egnell telegraph station was located at the mouth of Egnell Creek, not far from the mouth of the Hackett River. The locality of Sheslay is located at its confluence with the river of that name.

== History ==
The historic Yukon Telegraph Trail follows the Hackett River, running northwest from Saloon on the upper Little Tahltan River to Hyland Ranch on the upper Hackett, and on to Egnell and Sheslay near the mouth of the Hackett River.

== See also ==
- List of rivers of British Columbia
