= Dudidontu River =

- Mouth of Dudidontu River

Location
- Country: Canada
- Province: British Columbia
- District: Cassiar Land District

Physical characteristics
- Source: Level Mountain Range
  - location: Nahlin Plateau
  - coordinates: 58°24′12″N 131°26′54″W
  - elevation: 1,710 m (5,610 ft)
- Mouth: Nahlin River
  - coordinates: 58°47′22″N 131°59′5″W
  - elevation: 387 m (1,270 ft)
- Length: 112 km (70 mi)
- Basin size: 964 km^{2} (372 sq mi),
- Discharge
  - average: 15.4 m^{3}/s (540 cu ft/s)

Basin features
- Topo maps: NTS 104J5 Ketchum Lake; NTS 104J6 Beatty Creek; NTS 104J13 Prairie Lake; NTS 104J12 Dudidontu River

The Dudidontu River is a tributary of the Nahlin River in northwest part of the province of British Columbia, Canada. It joins the Nahlin River, which forms the Inklin River, one of the main tributaries of the Taku River. The Dudidontu River's watershed covers 964 km^{2} (372 sq mi), and its mean annual discharge is 15.4 m^{3}/s (540 cu ft/s). Almost half of the Dudidontu's flow comes from its main tributary, Kakuchuya Creek, and Kakuchuya Creek's main tributary, Matsatu Creek. The mouth of the Dudidontu River is located about 150 km (93 mi) northeast of Juneau, Alaska and about 110 km (68 mi) northwest of Telegraph Creek, British Columbia.

The Dudidontu River is in the traditional territory of the Taku River Tlingit First Nation, part of the Tlingit people.

== Geography ==
The Dudidontu River originates near the headwaters of the Little Tahltan River and Egnell Creek, in the Level Mountain Range on the Nahlin Plateau. From its source the river flows west in a U-shaped valley of Level Mountain, then south, then by Ketchum Lake, where the Dudidontu turns and flows generally north for the rest of its length, about 112 km (70 mi) in total. It flows by Camp Island Lake and between Level Mountain and the Heart Peaks. It is joined by its main tributary, Kakuchuya Creek, and Kakuchuya Creek's main tributary Matsatu Creek, both of which flow from Level Mountain.

The middle Dudidontu River, from Camp Island Lake to 6.4 km (4.0 mi) below Kakuchuya Creek, meanders through a wide floodplain, providing excellent spawning habitat for Chinook salmon. Below this section the lower Dudidontu flows through a 19.2 km (11.9 mi) long canyon with steep slopes of mud, boulders, and shale, with no vegetation. This section of the river is a series of almost continuous heavy rapids.

The Dudidontu River's watershed's land cover is classified as 37.9% shrubland, 25.3% conifer forest, 22.6% barren, and small amounts of other cover.

== See also ==
- List of rivers of British Columbia
