= Hu Gabrielse =

Canadian geologist (1926–2024)

Hubert Gabrielse (March 1, 1926 – March 11, 2024) was a Canadian geologist who worked for the Geological Survey of Canada. He devoted much of his more than 50 years in geosciences to regional geological mapping in the American Cordillera of British Columbia, southeast Yukon and southwest District of Mackenzie. His work has led to syntheses of the geological evolution of the northern Cordillera range.

Gabrielse published several papers with Stewart Blusson in the late 1960s. He was a contributor to Lithoprobe.

Gabrielse died in West Vancouver on March 11, 2024, at the age of 98.

One of the volcanoes found in the Tuya Volcanic Field is named after him, Gabrielse Cone.

== Awards ==
- 1990, awarded the Ambrose Medal by the Geological Association of Canada
- 2000, awarded the Logan Medal by the Geological Association of Canada

== See also ==
- Rocky Mountain Trench
