= Tuya volcanic field =

Volcanic field in Canada

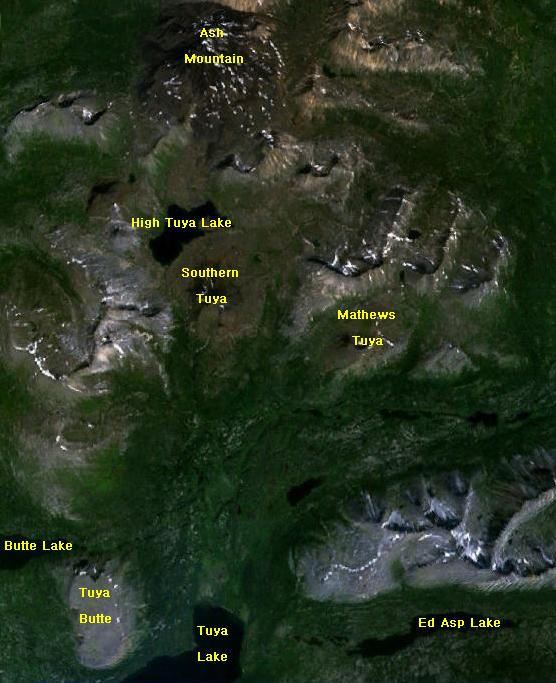
- Map of some features in the Tuya Volcanic Field

Highest point
- Elevation: 2,123 m (6,965 ft)
- Coordinates: 59°13′N 130°57′W

Geography
- Location: British Columbia, Canada

Geology
- Rock age: Quaternary
- Mountain type: Volcanic field
- Volcanic zone: Northern Cordilleran Volcanic Province
- Last eruption: Holocene

The Tuya volcanic field is a volcanic field of tuyas located in far northern British Columbia, Canada, near the border with the Yukon Territory and focused on the area of the Tuya Range, a subrange of the Stikine Ranges of the Cassiar Mountains, though some vents are in the Kawdy Plateau, the northernmost part of the Stikine Plateau. Several small shield volcanoes, and postglacial lapilli cones and lava flows have been reported in this area. The only nonglacial volcanoes in the field are Gabrielse Cone and the West Tuya lava field.

== Volcanoes ==
Volcanoes within the field include:

- Ash Mountain
- Blackfly Tuya
- Caribou Tuya
- Cottonwood Peak
- Gabrielse Cone
- Grizzly Butte
- Mount Josephine
- Klinkit Creek Peak
- Mathews Tuya
- Nome Lake South
- South Tuya
- Toozaza Peak
- Tuya Butte
- Volcano Vent
- West Vent

== See also ==
- List of volcanoes in Canada
- List of volcanic fields
- Northern Cordilleran Volcanic Province
- Volcanism in Canada
