= Rivers Without Borders =

American nonprofit

Coordinates: 48°6′54.6″N 122°45′27.4″W

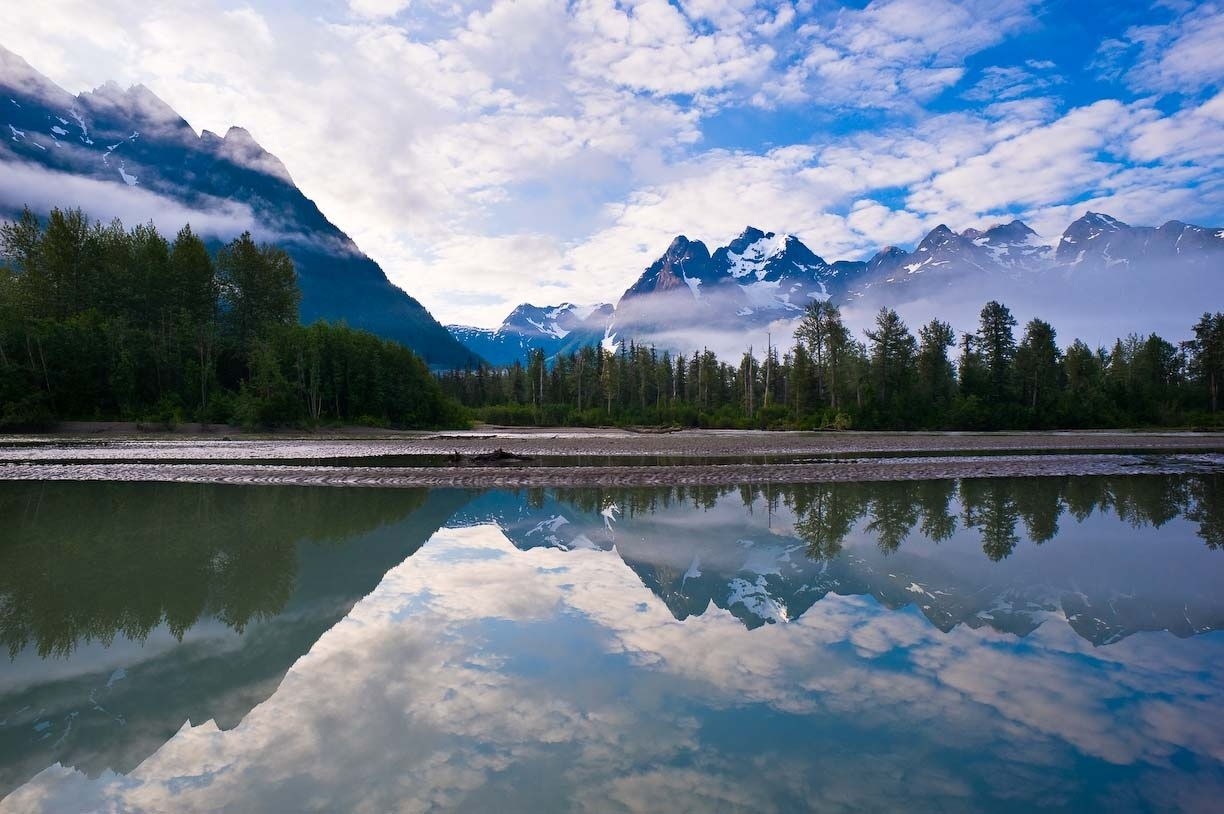
The Taku River in the Transboundary Watershed Region.

Rivers Without Borders is a nonprofit organization fiscally sponsored by the Tides Center in the United States. Rivers Without Borders works as a project of Tides Canada Initiatives in Canada. Tides Canada's mission is to provide uncommon solutions for the common good by leading and supporting actions that foster a healthy environment and just Canadian society.

Rivers Without Borders promotes a watershed-based conservation vision for the Transboundary Watershed Region of Southeast Alaska and northwest British Columbia. In a time of declining wild salmon populations, diminishing biodiversity, and climate change pressures, Rivers Without Borders promotes and protects the extraordinary ecological, wildlife habitat, and cultural values of the Transboundary Watershed Region. Rivers Without Borders has staff in U.S. offices in Juneau, Alaska, and Washington, as well as contract staff in British Columbia. Rivers Without Borders collaborates with First Nations, community leaders, commercial fishermen, scientists, local businesses, and other environmental organizations to keep the Transboundary Watershed Region one of North America's most valuable conservation assets.

== History ==
Rivers Without Borders began in 1999 as a network of Canadian and U.S. member organizations called the "Transboundary Watershed Alliance," coordinating efforts on regional environmental, indigenous rights and sustainability issues. The effort was intended to continue coordinated work that had begun in the Taku River watershed in 1995 and extend the model of transboundary collaborative work to the Stikine and other transboundary watersheds. The organization took as its major goals ensuring permanent protection of large, interconnected expanses of wilderness and supporting regional communities in developing alternative economies. While maintaining its original organizational ties and creating new alliances with commercial fishermen, biologists, guides, community leaders and others, Transboundary Watershed Alliance officially became Rivers Without Borders in 2007 and now functions as a distinct organization.

== River systems of focus ==
Rivers Without Borders focuses on seven watershed systems within the Transboundary Watershed Region that support abundant wildlife and all five species of Pacific salmon, which are critical to regional economies.

=== The Taku River Watershed ===
A pristine river basin in Southeast Alaska and northwest British Columbia, it covers 7,250 square miles (18,800 km^{2}). More than twice as large as Yellowstone National Park, it is the largest unprotected and basically undeveloped watershed on the Pacific Coast of North America. The Taku is the top salmon-producing river in Southeast Alaska and routinely ranks in Alaska's top five salmon producing rivers. According to the Alaska Department of Fish and Game, the river sees nearly 2 million wild salmon annually, including up to 100,000 Chinook salmon (king salmon), 350,000 sockeye salmon (red salmon) and 400,000 coho salmon (silver salmon), 50,000 chum salmon(dog salmon), and 1 million pink salmon (humpy salmon). Beyond its bounty of salmon, the Taku is home to eight other fish species, including steelhead, bull trout, Dolly Varden char, rainbow trout, lake trout, Arctic grayling, whitefish and Southeast Alaska's largest population of cutthroat trout. In addition, hooligans (eulachon), crab, shrimp and halibut are harvested at or near the river's mouth. That marine wealth supports major sport, commercial and tribal fisheries in Alaska and British Columbia. A 2004 report estimated "the annual economic impact from all activities on the Taku River to be $26.7 million." Commercial fishing generated about $6 million, sport fishing about $2 million, and commercial air activity generated $18 million with $13 million of that directly related to tourism. The Alaska Department of Fish and Game periodically updates the commercial salmon statistics.

=== The Iskut River-Stikine River Watershed ===
One of North America's largest and most intact wild salmon watersheds, the Stikine River is 400 miles/640 km long from its headwaters in British Columbia's Spatsizi Plateau to its estuary near Wrangell, Alaska. The Iskut River, the largest tributary of the Stikine, flows for 145 miles/236 km from Kluachon Lake near Iskut, British Columbia, to its confluence with the lower Stikine River near the US/Canada border.

=== The Unuk River Watershed ===
The Unuk is 80 miles/130 km) long and drains some 1500 square miles/3885 square km. It supports the largest runs of king (Chinook) salmon in southern Southeast Alaska.

=== The Whiting River Watershed ===
The wildest and most remote watershed in the British Columbia-Alaska transboundary region, the Whiting measures 50 miles/80 km long and lies between the Iskut-Stikine and Taku watersheds. The Canadian drainage area of the Whiting is 915 square miles/2,375 square km.

== Rivers Without Borders Taku River protection efforts ==
An effort by a Canadian company, Redfern Resources Ltd., to reopen the Tulsequah Chief Mine located on the Tulsequah River in British Columbia about 40 miles (64 km) northeast of Juneau, Alaska, ended early in 2009 when Redfern filed for protection under Canada's Companies' Creditors Arrangement Act (Part of Canada’s bankruptcy law). Prior to that, Rivers Without Borders had been providing information to the public about a proposed Redfern plan to use hoverbarges to haul mine ore to the sea on the Alaska side of the border, a transportation scheme that came to be eyed skeptically by Alaska state officials and Taku River residents. The hoverbarge proposal was dropped because of Redfern's bankruptcy in early 2009.

The mine, however, continues to pose a threat to the Taku River environment. In September 2010, a new company, Chieftain Metals, purchased the Tulsequah Chief Project, and currently plans to develop it.

Though the Tulsequah Chief Mine and the related Big Bull mine have not operated for decades, they have been leaking toxic acids into the Tulsequah River, a tributary to the Taku River. Since 1989, the Canadian government has monitored the Tulsequah Chief mine site, issuing several cleanup orders in the interim,. In a letter sent July 2009, former Alaska Governor Sarah Palin urged British Columbia Premier Gordon Campbell to cooperate with Alaska to find a way to mitigate the mine leakage and protect the Tulsequah and Taku Rivers. Late in 2011, Chieftain Metals installed an interim water treatment plant which is a short term solution to the historical acid mine drainage issue.

Rivers Without Borders is now seeking Alaska action to add stiffer environmental protection measures to the American end of the Taku River.

In June 2010, Rivers Without Borders launched the Taku Wild Salmon Stronghold campaign with a presentation to the board of the Salmon Stronghold Partnership in Portland, Oregon, asserting that the Taku watershed would be a natural and ideal addition to the Strongholds thus far designated in California, Oregon, Washington, and southern British Columbia. The 4,500,000-acre (18,000 km^{2}) watershed hosts robust populations of all five Pacific salmon species, is the top salmon producer for southeast Alaska, and is one of Canada’s most steady and significant salmon systems. For these reasons, Rivers Without Borders’ Wild Salmon Stronghold campaign has worked to secure the Taku as North America’s first International Wild Salmon Stronghold. Formal recognition would ensure that the Taku’s salmon values are properly prioritized and that indigenous, federal, provincial, and state government biologists and managers, as well as stakeholders, are coordinated in management, monitoring, and safeguarding fisheries resources.

Rivers Without Borders and the Rivers Institute at the British Columbia Institute of Technology prepared A Taku Salmon Stronghold report to assess the Taku’s suitability to join the North American Salmon Stronghold partnership: A Taku Salmon Stronghold: Initial Assessment of an Exceptional International Watershed.

== News ==
- Juneau Empire, (July 12, 2009) story: "Palin urges Canadians to address mine's acid drainage"
- Globe Mail, (July 28, 2009) column: Palin's parting words to B.C.: "Don't spill baby, don't spill"
- Yukon News, (July 31, 2009, story: "Redcorp's bankruptcy threatens salmon-rich Taku"
