= Cottonwood Peak =

Mountain in British Columbia, Canada

- Location within British Columbia
- Interactive map of Cottonwood Peak

Highest point
- Elevation: 1,640 m (5,380 ft)
- Coordinates: 59.40°N 130.25°W

Geography
- Location: British Columbia, Canada

Geology
- Rock age: Pleistocene
- Volcanic zone: Northern Cordilleran Volcanic Province
- Volcanic field: Tuya volcanic field
- Last eruption: Pleistocene

Cottonwood Peak is a mountain in northwestern British Columbia, Canada, located in the Iverson Creek area. It is a volcanic feature of the Northern Cordilleran Volcanic Province that formed in the past 1.6 million years during the Pleistocene Epoch.

== See also ==
- List of volcanoes in Canada
- List of Northern Cordilleran volcanoes
- Volcanic history of the Northern Cordilleran Volcanic Province
- Volcanism of Canada
- Volcanism of Western Canada
