= Sheslay River =

- Mouth of Sheslay River

Location
- Country: Canada
- Province: British Columbia
- District: Cassiar Land District

Physical characteristics
- Source: Boundary Ranges
  - location: Coast Mountains
  - coordinates: 57°54′58″N 132°19′4″W
  - elevation: 1,352 m (4,436 ft)
- Mouth: Inklin River
  - location: Stikine Plateau
  - coordinates: 58°46′34″N 132°5′38″W
  - elevation: 337 m (1,106 ft)
- Length: 150 km (93 mi)
- Basin size: 3,342 km^{2} (1,290 sq mi),
- Discharge
  - average: 65.3 m^{3}/s (2,310 cu ft/s)

Basin features
- Topo maps: NTS 104J4 Kennicott Lake; NTS 104J5 Ketchum Lake; NTS 104J16 Porter Landing

The Sheslay River is a tributary of the Inklin River in northwest part of the province of British Columbia, Canada. It joins the Nahlin River to form the Inklin River, one of the main tributaries of the Taku River. The lower Sheslay River marks the boundary between the Taku Plateau and the Nahlin Plateau. Its mouth at the Nahlin River marks the junction of the Taku, Nahlin, and Kawdy Plateaus. All three of these are part of the larger Stikine Plateau region.

The Sheslay River is in the traditional territory of the Taku River Tlingit First Nation, part of the Tlingit people.

The Sheslay River originates in the Cheja Range of the Boundary Ranges, close to the headwaters of the Chutine River and the Stikine Icecap. It flows generally north about 150 km (93 mi) to join the Nahlin River. The confluence of the Sheslay and Nahlin Rivers marks the beginning of the Inklin River. The mouth of the Sheslay River is located about 145 km (90 mi) northeast of Juneau, Alaska and about 110 km (68 mi) northwest of Telegraph Creek, British Columbia.

The Sheslay River's watershed covers 3,342 km^{2} (1,290 sq mi), and its mean annual discharge is 65.3 m^{3}/s (2,310 cu ft/s).

Major tributaries of the Sheslay River include Shearer Creek, Moosehorn Creek, Hackett River and Egnell Creek, Samotua River, and Tatsatua Creek. The middle Sheslay River, above the Samotua River, lies between the Chechidla Range and Level Mountain. The small settlement of Sheslay is located at the confluence of the Sheslay and Hackett Rivers. The lower Sheslay River, below the mouth of the Samotua River, flows just south and west of Heart Peaks, part of the Nahlin Plateau. The lowermost Sheslay River flows between the Taku and Nahlin Plateaus. Its confluence with the Nahlin River forms the Inklin River.

The Sheslay River supports a number salmonids, including Chinook salmon, coho salmon, sockeye salmon, steelhead trout, rainbow trout, lake trout, Dolly Varden trout, bull trout, and round whitefish. It also supports populations of coastrange sculpin and slimy sculpin.

== See also ==
- List of rivers of British Columbia
