= Simpson Peak =

Simpson Peak may refer to:

- Simpson Peak (Canada) in British Columbia, Canada
- Simpson Peak (Antarctica) in Antarctica
