= Grizzly Butte =

Mountain in British Columbia, Canada

Highest point
- Elevation: 1,412 m (4,633 ft)
- Prominence: 65 m (213 ft)
- Coordinates: 59°5′2.1″N 130°55′21.8″W

Geography
- Location: British Columbia, Canada
- District: Cassiar Land District
- Parent range: Kawdy Plateau (northern Stikine Plateau)
- Topo map: NTS 82L3 Oyama

Geology
- Rock age: Holocene
- Mountain type: Shield volcano
- Volcanic field: Tuya volcanic field
- Last eruption: Holocene

Grizzly Butte is a small shield volcano located in northwestern British Columbia, Canada. It is Holocene in age and stands in relief above the surrounding area north of the Nazcha Creek and, with West Vent and Volcano Vent, comprises the West Tuya lava field. It is one of three small shield volcanoes in the Tuya Volcanic Field, which in turn form part of the Northern Cordilleran Volcanic Province.

== See also ==
- List of volcanoes in Canada
- Volcanism of Western Canada
