= Stikine Region =

Unincorporated area in British Columbia, Canada

Stikine
- Unincorporated area
- Stikine Region
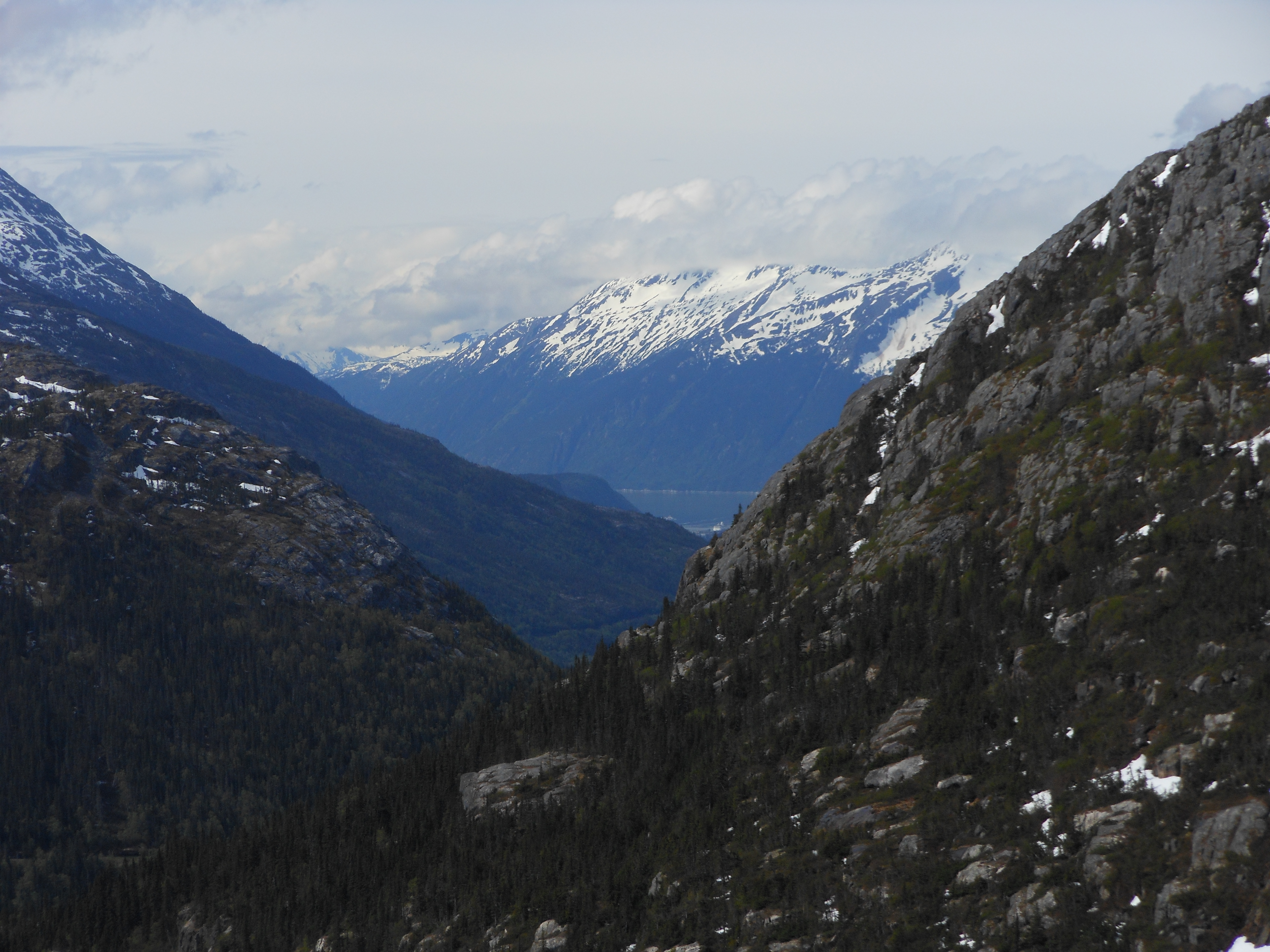
- White Pass and Yukon Route

- Major communities

- Location in British Columbia
- Country: Canada
- Province: British Columbia
- Largest community: Atlin

Government
  - Type: Unincorporated area
  - Body: None
  - Administrator: Government of British Columbia

Area
  - Land: 118,663.53 km^{2} (45,816.25 sq mi)

Population (2021)
  - Total: 683
  - Density: 0.0058/km^{2} (0.015/sq mi)
- Website: BC government page

The Stikine Region (/stəˈkiːn/) is an unincorporated area in northwestern British Columbia, Canada. It is the only area in the province that is not part of a regional district. The Stikine Region was left unincorporated following legislation that established the province's regional districts in 1968 and is not classified as a regional district. It contains no municipal governments which normally constitute the majority of seats on the boards of regional districts. There is only one local planning area, the Atlin Community Planning Area, which was combined in 2009 with the Atlin Community Improvement District to provide fire, landfill, water, streetlighting, sidewalks and advisory land use services. All other services not provided privately are administered directly by various provincial government ministries. The area around Dease Lake, formerly in the Stikine Region, is now within the boundaries of the Regional District of Kitimat–Stikine following a boundary amendment in 2008.

The Stikine Region has a total population of 740 (2016) including 355 First Nations persons, most from the Taku Tlingit of Atlin and Teslin, British Columbia, and some reserves of the Kaska Dena Council. Reserves and band governments are outside the jurisdiction of the provincial government which governs the Stikine Region directly through various ministry operations, as it is not an administrative body like a regional district and has no board. The 2006 census count was 1,109 persons. Until December 2007 it had an area of 132,496 square kilometres (51,157 sq mi) or about the size of the US state of Alabama or the Canadian province of Nova Scotia. Its population density of one inhabitant per 160 square kilometres (62 sq mi) makes it the least densely populated census division in both British Columbia and Canada as a whole.

== Demographics ==
As a census division in the 2021 Census of Population conducted by Statistics Canada, the Stikine Region had a population of 683 living in 386 of its 667 total private dwellings, a change of −7.7% from its 2016 population of 740. With a land area of 118,408.76 km^{2} (45,717.88 sq mi), it had a population density of 0.0/km^{2} (0.0/sq mi) in 2021.

Panethnic groups in the Stikine Region (1996−2021)
Panethnic group	2021		2016		2011		2006		2001		1996	
Panethnic group	Pop.	%	Pop.	%	Pop.	%	Pop.	%	Pop.	%	Pop.	%
European (Note: Statistic includes all persons that did not make up part of a visible minority or an indigenous identity.)	350	53.44%	365	49.32%	315	52.5%	595	53.6%	730	55.51%	820	58.99%
Indigenous	290	44.27%	365	49.32%	275	45.83%	490	44.14%	535	40.68%	560	40.29%
East Asian (Note: Statistic includes total responses of "Chinese", "Korean", and "Japanese" under visible minority section on census.)	0	0%	10	1.35%	0	0%	10	0.9%	50	3.8%	0	0%
Southeast Asian (Note: Statistic includes total responses of "Filipino" and "Southeast Asian" under visible minority section on census.)	0	0%	0	0%	0	0%	10	0.9%	0	0%	0	0%
African	0	0%	0	0%	0	0%	0	0%	0	0%	10	0.72%
Other (Note: Statistic includes total responses of "Visible minority, n.i.e." and "Multiple visible minorities" under visible minority section on census.)	15	2.29%	0	0%	10	1.67%	0	0%	0	0%	0	0%
Total responses	655	95.9%	740	100%	600	95.39%	1,110	100.09%	1,315	99.92%	1,390	99.78%
Total population	683	100%	740	100%	629	100%	1,109	100%	1,316	100%	1,393	100%

- Note: Totals greater than 100% due to multiple origin responses.

== Terminology ==
The term Stikine Region should not be confused with the terms Stikine Territory, Stikine District, or Stikine Country, which all mean something slightly different:

- Half the historical Stikine Country, roughly synonymous with the Stikine Mining District of colonial times, as being the entire basin of that river, is in the Regional District of Kitimat–Stikine.
- The Stikine Territory was a colonial-era entity which existed briefly and had boundaries differing from that of the Stikine Country per se, being latitudinal on its eastern extent and so cutting across terrain rather than defined by it; its southern boundary was the line of the Finlay and Nass Rivers, while its northern boundary was the 62nd parallel, north of which was the North-Western Territory. When the Stikine Territory was absorbed into British Columbia in 1863, the North-West Territory was expanded south to the 60th parallel and the merged Stikine Territory significantly reduced in size. In 1867, the former Stikine Territory was further reduced in size when British claims on the lisière portion of the Alaska Panhandle were ignored by both Russia and the United States in course of the Alaska Purchase. Even after that, British perceptions that British territory had included the sites of Skagway, Haines and Dyea were overruled in the settlement of the Alaska Boundary Dispute.

Most of the Stikine Region, the boundaries of which reflect modern-era administrative realities, is composed of areas not part of the historical or geographical Stikine Country and the related Stikine Mining District but which were part of the Stikine Territory. These were the Atlin District and some of the Cassiar Mining Districts, as well as some of the Liard basin, plus the basin of the Tatshenshini-Alsekin the "BC Panhandle" west of Skagway and north of Alaska's Glacier Bay National Park.

In the 2001 Census, Statistics Canada enumerated the following list of "Designated Places". None of them are municipalities – they are a mixture of Indian Reserves (IR; names end in numbers) and "Indian settlements" (aboriginal communities that are not formally identified as Indian Reserves), which are geographically within the boundaries of the Stikine Region Regional District Electoral Area, with the following populations as per the 2006 Canadian Census: (Note: Indian Reserves (IRs) are only locationally within the Stikine Region and are outside its administrative jurisdiction.)

Settlement	Population
Stikine Region Regional District Electoral Area*	574
Dease Lake*	384
Liard River 3 (IR)	0
Five Mile Point 3 (IR)	95
Good Hope Lake	32
Dease Lake 9 (IR)	68
Lower Post Indian settlement	113
Unnamed 10 (IR) (near Atlin)	227
Tahltan 1 (IR)	0
* Dease Lake is now part of the Regional District of Kitimat–Stikine since December 1, 2007 (census was taken prior to that date).

It is bordered by the Yakutat, Skagway-Hoonah-Angoon, Juneau and Haines boroughs of the US state of Alaska to the west, Yukon to the north (which has no county-like system of division), the Northern Rockies Regional Municipality and Peace River Regional District to the east, and the Regional Districts of Bulkley–Nechako and Kitimat–Stikine to the south.

== Mining industry ==
The principal economic activity in the region is mining. The region's largest mine was the Cassiar asbestos mine which opened in 1952. The mine was depleted by 1991 and after a failed expansion to more underground deposits, it was closed in early 1992. The Erickson Gold mine was operational from 1979 to 1988. The Taurus gold mine operated between 1982 and 1988. Both were planned to re-open in 1993–1994 but neither was able. The Golden Bear gold-silver mine operated between 1990 and 1993 before closing due to cost overruns. It was re-opened in 1997 after shifting to underground mining, from open-pit, but closed again in late 2001. The new Tulsequah Chief Mine on the Tulsequah River, a tributary of the Taku, south of the Atlin Country and just inside the international boundary to the north of Juneau, Alaska, with an estimated at 7.7 million tons – containing copper, lead, zinc, gold and silver – is under construction.

== Preservation ==
A major discovery of copper, gold, cobalt, silver and zinc was removed from mining potential with the establishment in 1993 of the Tatshenshini-Alsek Provincial Park, located in the province's northwesternmost panhandle. The park's establishment ended plans to build the Windy Craggy Mine megaproject. The area is now part of a World Heritage Site with Kluane National Park and Glacier Bay National Monument, which flank it to the north and south. Other provincial parks in the Stikine Region include the Atlin Provincial Park and Recreation Area and the Spatsizi Plateau Wilderness Provincial Park. Though much of the Stikine Region is unprotected, the area's remoteness and unusual subarctic landscapes, and location along one of only two overland routes to the Yukon and Alaska, are attracting a growing amount of tourist traffic and generating employment in outfitting, guiding and hunting.
