= Taku Plateau =

- Plateau
- Location within British Columbia
- Coordinates: 58°42′N 132°30′W
- Location: British Columbia
- Part of: Stikine Plateau

The Taku Plateau is a sub-plateau of the Stikine Plateau in the far northwestern Interior of British Columbia, Canada. It lies to the south of the Teslin Plateau, part of the Yukon Plateau and to the southeast of the Yukon Plateau's other major sub-area within British Columbia, the Tagish Highland. Immediately northeast is the Kawdy Plateau and to the northwest of the Nahlin Plateau (both also components of the Stikine Plateau). The Inklin River forms the plateau's southwestern boundary with the northwestern extremities of the Tahltan Highland, beyond which are the Boundary Ranges. Very mountainous, its highest summit is Nahlin Mountain.

== Subranges ==
- Chutine Range
- Menatatuline Range
