= West Vent =

Volcano in British Columbia, Canada

- Location within British Columbia
- Interactive map of West Vent

Highest point
- Elevation: 1,452 m (4,764 ft)
- Coordinates: 59°7′34.8″N 131°0′35.7″W

Geography
- Location: British Columbia, Canada
- District: Cassiar Land District
- Parent range: Kawdy Plateau (northern Stikine Plateau

Geology
- Rock age: Holocene
- Mountain type: Shield volcano
- Volcanic field: Tuya volcanic field
- Last eruption: Holocene

West Vent is one of three small shield volcanoes located in the Tuya Volcanic Field of the Northern Cordilleran Volcanic Province in British Columbia, Canada. It is Holocene in age and stands in relief above the surrounding area north of the Nazcha Creek, which comprises the West Tuya lava field.

== See also ==
- Tuya Volcanic Field
- List of volcanoes in Canada
- Volcanism of Canada
- Volcanism of Western Canada
- Grizzly Butte
- Volcano Vent
