= Volcano Vent =

Shield volcano in British Columbia, Canada

- Location within British Columbia
- Interactive map of Volcano Vent

Highest point
- Elevation: 1,324 m (4,344 ft)
- Coordinates: 59°7′28.1″N 130°55′22.4″W

Geography
- Location: British Columbia, Canada
- District: Cassiar Land District
- Parent range: Kawdy Plateau (northern Stikine Plateau)

Geology
- Rock age: Holocene
- Mountain type: Shield volcano
- Volcanic zone: Northern Cordilleran Volcanic Province
- Volcanic field: Tuya volcanic field
- Last eruption: Holocene

Volcano Vent is a small shield volcano in northern British Columbia, Canada. It is Holocene in age and stands in relief above the surrounding area north of the Nazcha Creek and comprises the West Tuya lava field with West Vent and Grizzly Butte. It is one of the three small shield volcanoes in the Tuya Volcanic Field which in turn form part of the Northern Cordilleran Volcanic Province. Most of the rock studied and sampled at Volcano Vent is massive coherent basalt.

== See also ==
- List of volcanoes in Canada
- Volcanism of Western Canada
