= Stikine Plateau =

Plateau in British Columbia, Canada

- Plateau
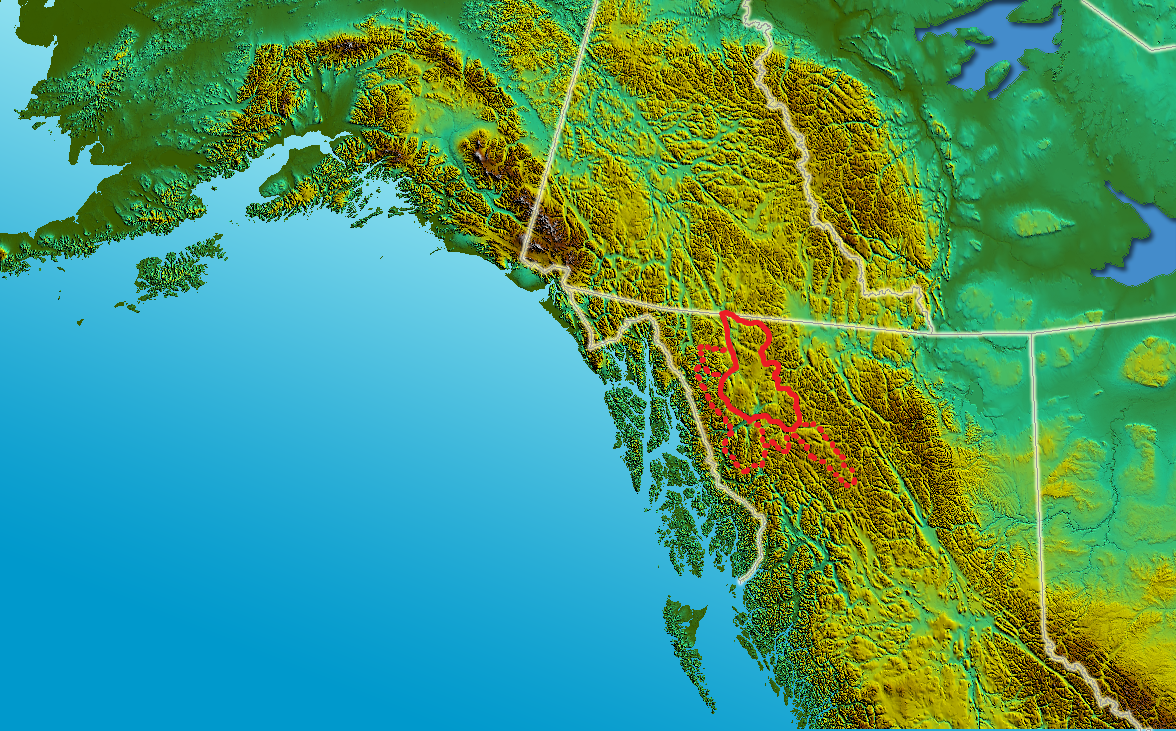
- Approximate boundaries of the Stikine Plateau
- Coordinates: 58°30′N 130°30′W
- Location: British Columbia, Canada
- Part of: Intermontane Plateaus

The Stikine Plateau is a plateau in northern British Columbia, Canada. It lies between the Boundary Ranges of the Coast Mountains on the west and southwest and the Cassiar Mountains along its northeast, and between the Skeena Mountains on its south and southeast and the Jennings and Nakina Rivers on the north.

== Sub-plateaus and mountain ranges ==
The plateau has a number of sub-plateaus:

- the Spatsizi Plateau is the southeasternmost and occupies the area between the Skeena Mountains and includes the headwaters of the Stikine River and the basin of the Spatsizi River.
- the Tanzilla Plateau lies north of the Stikine River and to the east of the Tuya River and includes the basin of the Tanzilla River and the headwaters of the Dease River around Dease Lake and the community of the same name. The upper portion of the Grand Canyon of the Stikine, a lava-walled gorge which is cut into the larger Stikine Plateau by that river, begins on the southern edge of this plateau downstream from the community of Telegraph Creek.
- the Klastline Plateau lies south of the Stikine River to the north of the Klappan Range of the Skeena Mountains and includes the headwaters of the Iskut River. The communities of Eddontenajon and Iskut are located on this plateau, which is traversed by BC Highway 37 from north to south.
- the Nahlin Plateau lies west of the Tuya River, north of the Tahltan River, southwest of the Sheslay River and southwest of the Nahlin River; both of the latter are in the basin of the Taku River, via the Inklin. It includes Heart Peaks and the Level Mountain Range, the latter of which is a cluster of bare volcanic peaks on the broad summit of Level Mountain.
- the Kawdy Plateau lies to the north of the Nahlin River, to the west of the Tuya River and includes the low but rugged Atsutla Range, which lies in the angle of the Jennings and Teslin Rivers.
- the Taku Plateau lies to the west of the Nahlin and Kawdy Plateaus and is located roughly in the angle of the Nakina and Inklin Rivers, though including areas on the far side of the lower sections of both rivers.
- the Tahltan Highland, which may also be considered to be a part of the Coast Mountains, is an intermediary area of relatively lower mountains between the Boundary Ranges and the Taku and Nahlin Plateaus, being bounded roughly by the Inklin and Tahltan Rivers on its northeast flank. It also includes a large area south of the Stikine, including the Mount Edziza massif and the Spectrum Range. Its southern limit is described by a pass between upper Mess Creek and the valley of the Iskut River to the south of the Spectrum Range, and it is bounded at its southeastern extremity by the Iskut, across which is the Klappan Range of the Skeena Mountains.

== See also ==
- Interior Mountains
