= Inklin =

- Location of Inklin in British Columbia
- Coordinates: 58°55′00″N 133°08′00″W
- Country: Canada
- Province: British Columbia
- Area codes: 250, 778

Inklin is a locality situated at the confluence of the Inklin and Nakina Rivers in far northwestern British Columbia, Canada, which is the commencement of the Taku River.
