= Toozaza Peak =

Mountain in British Columbia, Canada

- Location within British Columbia

Highest point
- Elevation: 2,182 m (7,159 ft)
- Prominence: 782 m (2,566 ft)
- Coordinates: 59°29′13.9″N 130°26′12.9″W

Geography
- Location: British Columbia, Canada
- Parent range: Stikine Ranges
- Topo map: NTS 104O8 Maria Lake

Geology
- Rock age: Pleistocene
- Mountain type: Tuya
- Volcanic field: Tuya volcanic field
- Last eruption: Pleistocene

Toozaza Peak is a tuya in the Stikine Ranges of the Cassiar Mountains in northern British Columbia, Canada, located in the Iverson Creek. Toozaza Peak is the summit of a north–south aligned ridge between the head of Toozaza Creek and the head of the Jennings River, just south of the Jennings' divide with the Little Rancheria River headwaters. The Little Rancheria and Toozaza Creek are part of the Liard, while the Jennings is part of the Yukon River drainage via Teslin Lake, and the peak therefore stands astride the line of the Continental Divide. It is part of the Tuya Volcanic Field, a volcanic field associated with the Stikine Volcanic Belt, part of the Northern Cordilleran Volcanic Province.

== See also ==
- List of volcanoes in Canada
- List of Northern Cordilleran volcanoes
- Volcanism of Canada
- Volcanism of Western Canada
