= Swift River, Yukon =

Human settlement in Yukon, Canada

Coordinates: 60.01942°N 131.045666°W

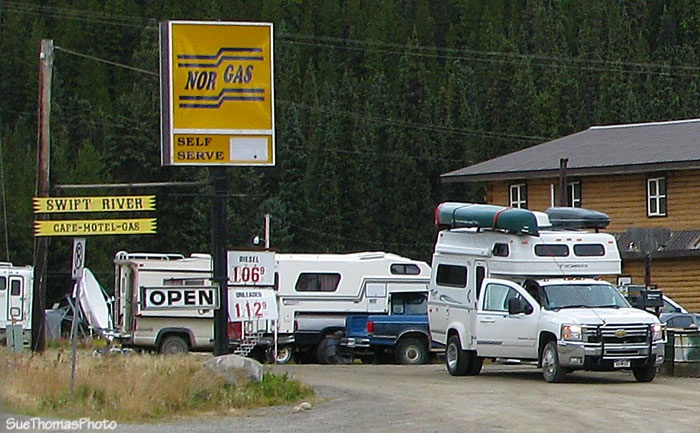
Gas station in Swift River

Swift River is a settlement in the Canadian territory of Yukon, primarily a service stop on the Alaska Highway at historical mile 733. The radius of the area is estimated to be about 22.71 square kilometres (8.77 square miles). The only permanent population owns and operates, or is employed at, the area's commercial highway establishment. Other residents are transient, working at the Yukon government's highway maintenance camp.

== History ==
=== Founding and World War II ===
During the construction of the Alaska Highway, during World War II, the settlement was created in order to supply U.S and Canadian authorities, becoming an essential roadhouses for the construction of the highway.

== Demographics ==
Federal census population history of Swift River
Year	Pop.	±%
1981	24	—
1986	5	−79.2%
1991	14	+180.0%
1996	15	+7.1%
2001	15	+0.0%
2006	10	−33.3%
2011	0	−100.0%
2016	0	0.00%
2021	5	—
Source: Statistics Canada

In the 2021 Census of Population conducted by Statistics Canada, Swift River had a population of 5 living in 3 of its 3 total private dwellings, an increase of 5 from its 2016 population of 0. With a land area of 22.88 km^{2} (8.83 sq mi), it had a population density of 0.2/km^{2} (0.6/sq mi) in 2021.

== Climate ==
There is a weather station for Swift River located on the eastern bank of the Swift River (Teslin Lake), at an elevation of 891 m (2923 ft).

Climate data for Swift River, Yukon, 1981-2003 normals, 1966-2008 extremes: 891m (2923ft)
Month	Jan	Feb	Mar	Apr	May	Jun	Jul	Aug	Sep	Oct	Nov	Dec	Year
Record high °C (°F)	9 (48)	16 (61)	16 (61)	24 (75)	31 (88)	31 (88)	31 (88)	31 (88)	27 (81)	29 (84)	11 (52)	8 (46)	31 (88)
Mean maximum °C (°F)	1.1 (34.0)	4.4 (40.0)	6.9 (44.4)	13.3 (56.0)	20.2 (68.3)	24.9 (76.8)	26.4 (79.5)	25.6 (78.0)	18.7 (65.7)	12.4 (54.3)	3.6 (38.4)	2.7 (36.8)	28.1 (82.5)
Mean daily maximum °C (°F)	−11.9 (10.6)	−6.9 (19.6)	−1.1 (30.0)	5.7 (42.3)	11.9 (53.4)	17.7 (63.8)	19.8 (67.6)	17.6 (63.7)	11.7 (53.1)	3.7 (38.7)	−6.9 (19.6)	−10.6 (12.9)	4.2 (39.6)
Daily mean °C (°F)	−17.7 (0.2)	−14.4 (6.0)	−9.4 (15.1)	−2.2 (28.0)	4.8 (40.7)	10.0 (50.0)	12.2 (54.0)	10.2 (50.3)	5.4 (41.7)	−1.2 (29.8)	−12.4 (9.7)	−16.6 (2.1)	−2.6 (27.3)
Mean daily minimum °C (°F)	−23.2 (−9.7)	−21.8 (−7.2)	−17.2 (1.1)	−9.9 (14.2)	−2.1 (28.3)	2.6 (36.6)	5.0 (41.0)	2.9 (37.2)	−0.7 (30.8)	−6.1 (21.1)	−17.8 (0.0)	−22.3 (−8.1)	−9.2 (15.4)
Mean minimum °C (°F)	−38.8 (−37.9)	−35.6 (−32.1)	−32.2 (−25.9)	−21.2 (−6.1)	−8.5 (16.7)	−2.5 (27.5)	0.3 (32.6)	−2.4 (27.7)	−6.9 (19.6)	−19.4 (−2.9)	−31.7 (−25.0)	−36.9 (−34.4)	−44.6 (−48.3)
Record low °C (°F)	−52 (−62)	−54 (−65)	−44 (−47)	−33 (−28)	−17 (1)	−7 (20)	−4 (25)	−7 (19)	−17 (2)	−38 (−36)	−44 (−47)	−49 (−56)	−54 (−65)
Average precipitation mm (inches)	38 (1.49)	30 (1.20)	24 (0.96)	17 (0.65)	19 (0.73)	29 (1.16)	43 (1.71)	42 (1.64)	52 (2.04)	51 (2.01)	45 (1.77)	39 (1.54)	429 (16.9)
Average snowfall cm (inches)	38 (14.9)	30 (12.0)	24 (9.4)	14 (5.7)	3.0 (1.2)	0.0 (0.0)	0.0 (0.0)	trace	3.0 (1.2)	33 (13.0)	43 (17.0)	39 (15.4)	227 (89.8)
Source: XMACIS2 (normals, extremes & precip/snow)
