= Joseph Schwab =

German spree killer

- Born: Joseph Thomas Schwab; 25 November 1960; Starnberg, West Germany
- Died: 19 June 1987 (age 26); Fitzroy Crossing, Australia
- Cause of death: Gunshot wounds
- Other name: The Kimberley Killer
- Motive: Unknown

Details
- Victims: 5
- Span of crimes: 9 June 1987 – 14 June 1987
- Country: Australia
- States: Northern Territory, Western Australia

Joseph Thomas Schwab, also known as Josef Schwab (25 November 1960 – 19 June 1987) was a German spree killer, who murdered five people in the Top End region of the Northern Territory and the Kimberley region of Western Australia during June 1987. Schwab, a German citizen, was visiting Australia on a tourist visa. The media dubbed him the "Kimberley Killer".

== Early life ==
Schwab was born in Starnberg, Bavaria, West Germany on 25 November 1960. A shy and timid student, he joined the rifle club of Pocking at age 15, remaining a member until 1981. The club typically used air rifles, but Schwab preferred an actual firearm. He had two prior incidents in which he threatened to shoot others over conflicts. In the first instance, Schwab was at a hotel frequented by the rifle club for drinking and ranted to fellow member Helmut Schmiedel about his parents and his apprenticeship boss. When the older man tried to calm him down, Schwab pushed the barrel of a concealed gun in his abdomen and threatened to kill Schmiedel if he told anyone of his complaints. A second incident occurred after Schwab got into a physical fight with electrician Renatu Schlepp and subsequently threatened to kill him. Three days later, Schlepp found Schwab in an ambush position with a rifle, with Schlepp incapacitating Schwab by hitting him with a piece of wood.

On 15 June 1981, he travelled to Adelaide, South Australia, and worked as a cabinet maker while also joining the local pistol club. Owning several rifles and a 4WD, he also went feral pig shooting. He returned to Germany on 10 May 1984, becoming a security guard and was trained in using a pistol. He was employed as a night watchman from 3 April 1985 to 15 April 1987, and during this time, he committed several minor crimes.

On 18 April 1987, he arrived in Brisbane, Australia via Bangkok as a tourist. On 22 April, he rented a Toyota 4Runner at Brisbane Airport before buying four rifles (.223-caliber Ruger Mini-14 semi-automatic rifle, a .308 SAKO bolt-action rifle, a 6.5x55mm Swedish Mauser m/1896 bolt action rifle and a .22-caliber Brno Model 581 semi-automatic rifle) and a Winchester 12-gauge pump-action shotgun and 3,000 rounds of ammunition. He later departed west and was in the vicinity of the Diamantina River by 6 May and in the Darwin area by 20 May.

== Killings ==
=== 9 June ===
The gunman's first known victims were Marcus Bullen (70), a former deputy mayor of Fremantle, and his son, Lance Bullen (42), who were shot dead from behind with a Ruger on the morning of 9 June, while scouting for a fishing spot on the banks of the Victoria River. They were reported missing to Timber Creek Police, and their burnt out station wagon was found the next day and their stripped bodies were discovered nearby in poorly hidden shallow graves.

=== 14 June ===
Five days later, three locals who went fishing overnight, Phillip Walkemeyer (26), his fiancée Julie Warren (25), and their friend, Terry Bolt (36), were shot dead hundreds of kilometres away in neighbouring Western Australia in similar circumstances at a campsite at the Pentecost River Crossing near Wyndham. They were reported missing the next day after not appearing at work, and colleagues (two of whom had camped with them the day before) returned to the site and found their burnt Toyota and traces of blood. Police then located the bodies floating nearby in the river. As in the previous incident, Schwab had stripped the victims, put their possessions in their vehicle, and then drove it a short distance away and set it on fire.

=== Investigation ===
Police investigations were unable to determine a motive for the killings, and the killer evaded capture despite roadblocks being set up across the area. A seven-member team of police officers from the Tactical Response Group and an officer from the forensic division were rushed by chartered jet from Perth to Kununurra to assist Kimberley police with the apprehension of the suspect. Forensics identified the weapon used in the murders as a Ruger Mini-14 .223 semi-automatic rifle. The killer was suspected to be driving a white Toyota 4Runner with conspicuous red side stripes after a truck driver saw a vehicle with this description leaving the area of the second vehicle fire.

=== Death ===
An intensive police search and network of roadblocks was unable to locate the suspect vehicle. However, an outback livestock mustering helicopter pilot from Napier Downs station, raised the alarm after spotting a camouflaged vehicle in bushland near Fitzroy Crossing. Tactical police, unsure if the hidden vehicle belonged to the gunman they were looking for, approached it cautiously on the ground and then called on a police Cessna 182 to fly over the site in an attempt to flush the occupant out into the open. A man dressed in military trousers and armed with a semi-automatic weapon emerged from the camouflaged camp and opened fire on the aircraft.

Police on the ground identified themselves, whereupon the gunman opened fire on them too. Police returned fire, including firing tear gas canisters, eventually killing the gunman after a protracted firefight. He had died from a single gunshot to the heart. Police were able to save the vehicle from a grassfire started by the canisters, finding personal items (licences, credit cards, camping goods etc.) from the victims inside. The body was then flown to Perth for analysis. They later identified the gunman as Schwab based on rental and immigration documents, but his motive for the killings remains unknown.

== Media ==
The crime was featured in 2007 in series 1, episode 10 of Crime Investigation Australia entitled The Kimberley Killer. The crime was also featured on Casefile True Crime Podcast, case 70, aired December 2017.

== See also ==
- Michael Eugene Oros
