= Unnamed 10 =

Unnamed 10 is an Indian reserve of the Taku River Tlingit in British Columbia. It is located in the Atlin townsite and occupies 2.8 hectares.
