= Sheslay, British Columbia =

Sheslay
- Location of Sheslay in British Columbia
- Coordinates: 58°16′00″N 131°48′00″W
- Country: Canada
- Province: British Columbia
- Area codes: 250, 778

Sheslay is an unincorporated settlement in the far northwestern corner of British Columbia, Canada, located at the mouth of Egnell Creek and the confluence of the Hackett and Sheslay Rivers.
