= Tulsequah =

- Location of Tulsequah in British Columbia
- Coordinates: 58°38′42.7596″N 133°32′32.85″W
- Country: Canada
- Province: British Columbia
- Area codes: 250, 778

Tulsequah is an unincorporated locality in northwestern, British Columbia, Canada, populated by the employees of the Polaris-Taku Gold Mine, and subsequent Tulsequah Chief Cu-Pb-Zn Mine on the Tulsequah River.

The point location recorded on maps was actually the location of the Canada Post Office . (Common mapping practice if there is no City Hall). The bulk of the townsite was located 7.8 km Northwest, upstream on the west bank of the Tulsequah River adjacent to the mine workings of the Polaris-Taku Gold Mine.

Government policy at the time precluded post office construction on the mining property, hence its somewhat distal location. The access road connecting the barge landing on the south west bank of the Tulsequah and Taku River’s confluence provided a link to the population of the town.

The Polaris Taku Gold Mine operated between 1937 and 1951, excluding the war years 1942-1945. Upon its closing, the site was re-tooled to process the Cu-Pb-Zn ore from the Tulsequah Chief Deposit located a further 4 km upstream on the east bank of the Tulsequah River. This mine ceased production in 1954 and the townsite abandoned.
The company employed a watchmen on site for a number of years, however the annual glacial lake outbursts, or Jokulhlaups, flooding the entire valley floor eroded the protective dike around the townsite and it was left to the elements.

The Tulsequah Chief Mine is located nearby, approximately 11 km north up the Tulsequah River from the referenced coordinates at its confluence with the Taku river.
