= Tulsequah River =

Coordinates: 58°38′00″N 133°33′00″W

The Tulsequah River, formerly the Talsekwe River (Lingít: Taaltsux̱éi), is a tributary of the Taku River in northwestern British Columbia, located south of the Atlin District and inland from Juneau, Alaska. The unincorporated settlement of Tulsequah is located at the confluence.

== Protection Efforts ==
Canadian environmental officials have known for decades the closed Tulsequah Chief Mine leaks acids into the Tulsequah River and ultimately into the Taku River and have monitored the site and issued several orders for cleanup since 1989. In July 2009, former Alaska Gov. Sarah Palin wrote a letter to B.C. Premier Gordon Campbell urging him to collaborate with Alaska in an effort to mediate the mine leakage. An Alaska organization, Rivers Without Borders, has been working to gain legislative protection for the Taku River on the Alaska side, an effort driven in part by the mine's waste flowing into the Tulsequah River.

== See also ==
- List of rivers of British Columbia
