= Transboundary Watershed Region =

Region of Canada and the United States

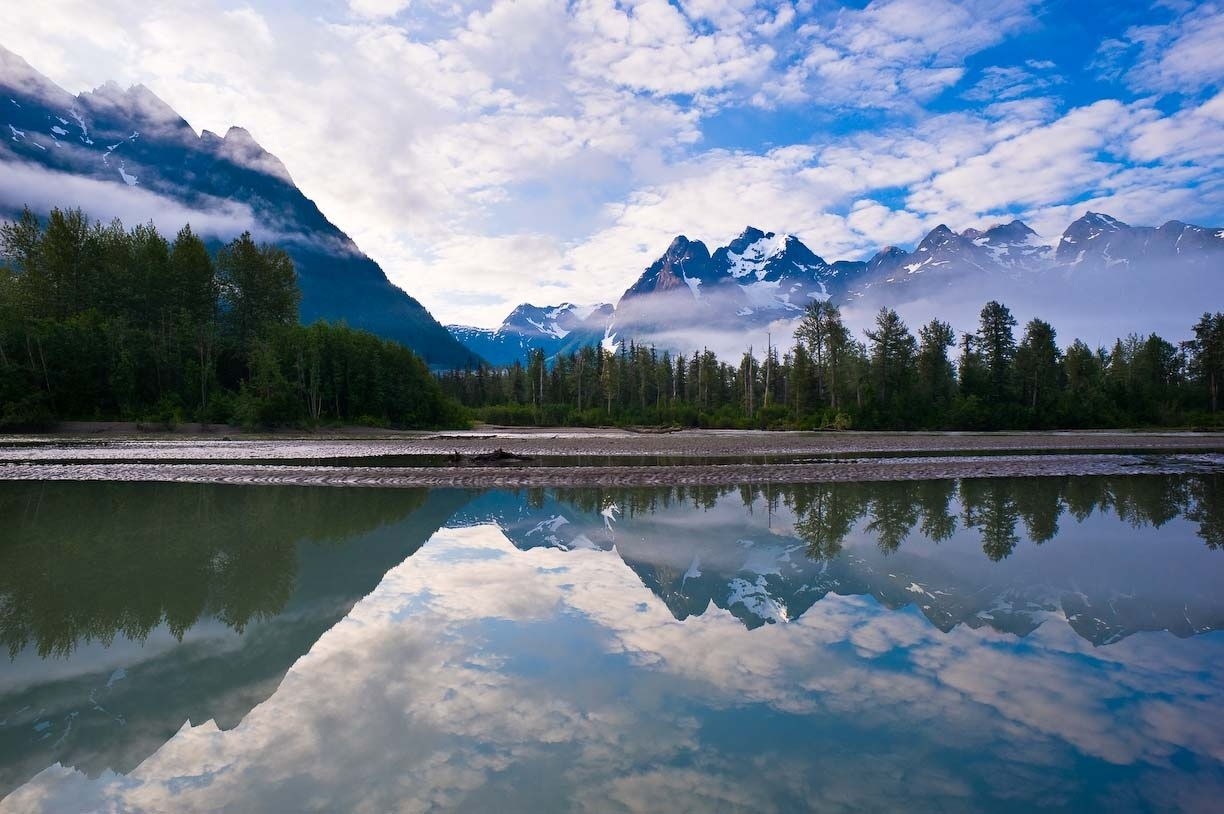
The Taku River in the Transboundary Watershed Region.

The Transboundary Watershed Region is a region of northwest British Columbia and southeast Alaska that includes the Tatshenshini-Alsek, Chilkat, Chilkoot, Skagway, Taiya, Taku, Iskut-Stikine, Unuk, and Whiting watersheds. The region extends from high alpine tundra, through boreal landscapes and coastal rainforests, to the island marine environment of southeast Alaska, covering over 130,000 square kilometres (32,000,000 acres).

The land and rivers within these watersheds support populations of wildlife including: grizzly and black bears, moose, caribou, mountain goats, sheep, wolves, and rare migratory birds. The major rivers of the region are abundant with wild Pacific salmon.

The "Transboundary Watershed Region" remains home to the Tlingit, Tahltan, Haida, Champagne-Aishihik and Carcross-Tagish First Nations, among others.

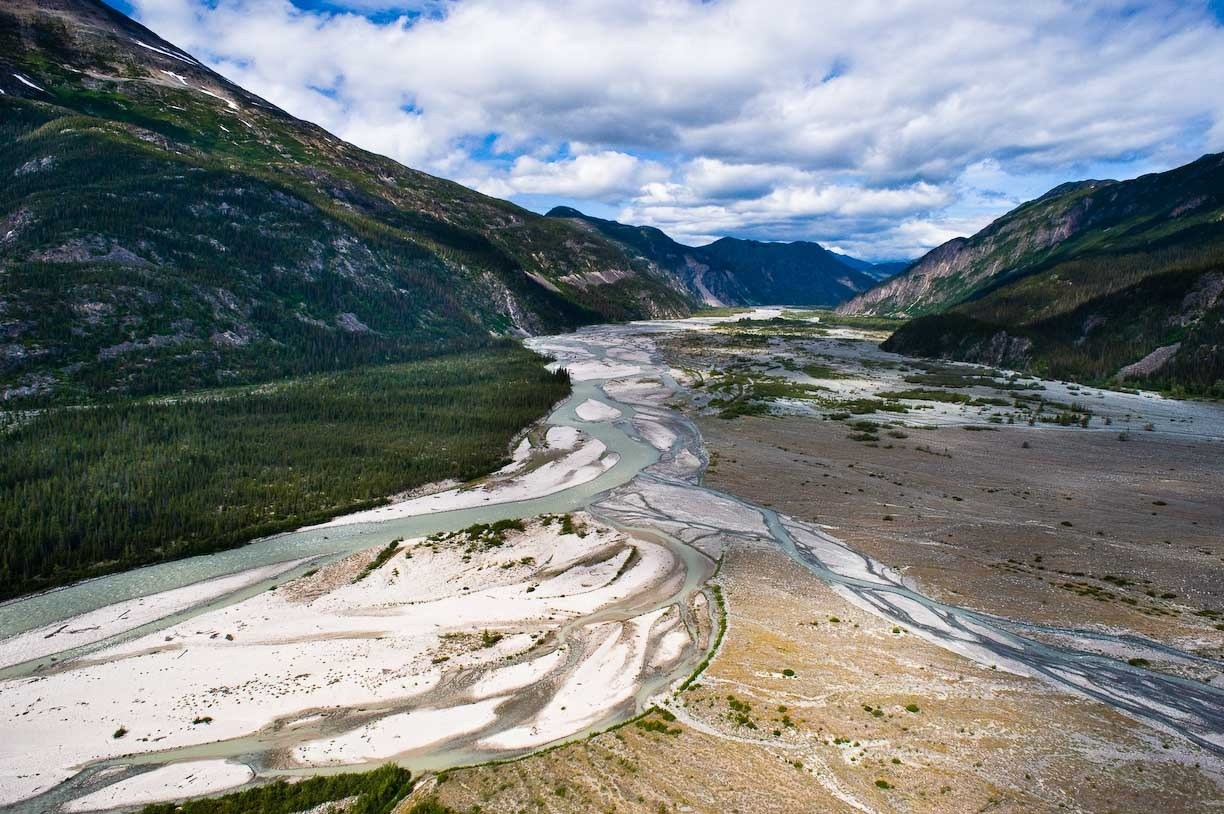
Taku Headwaters

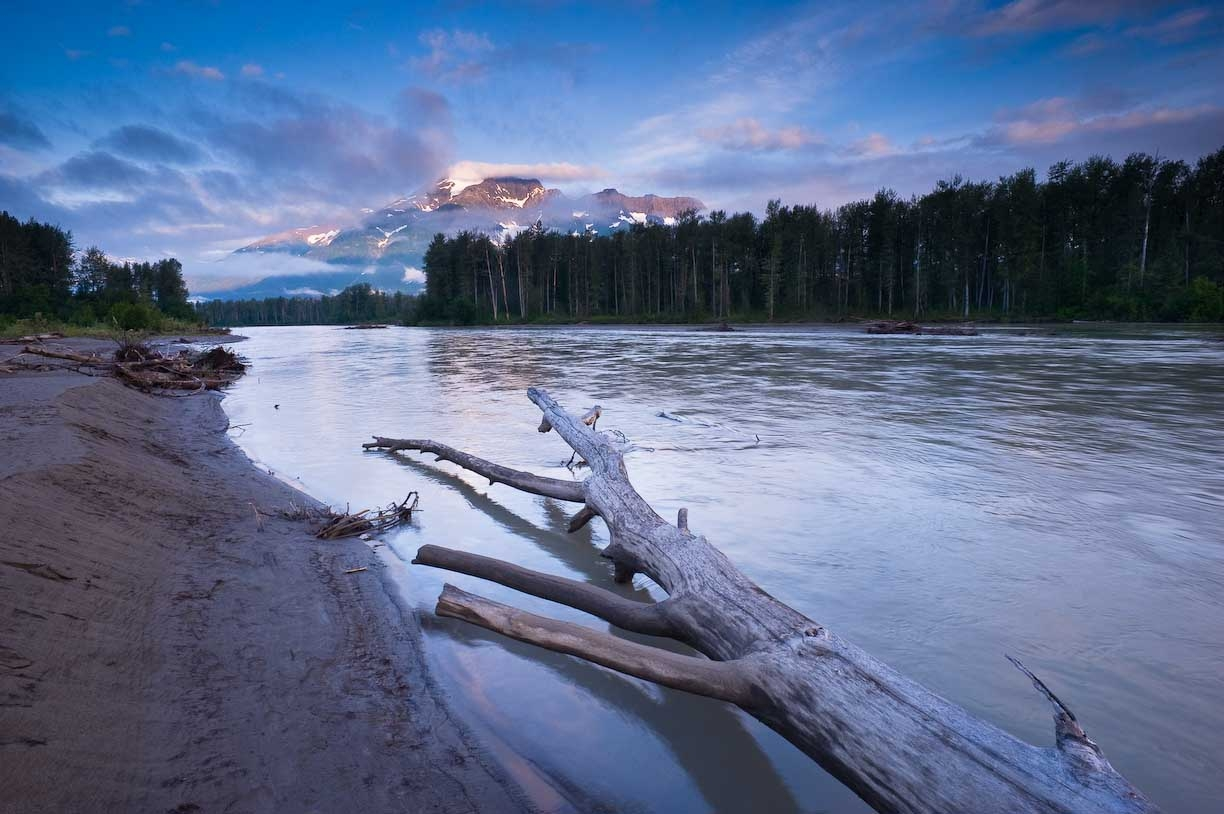
Driftwood on the Taku

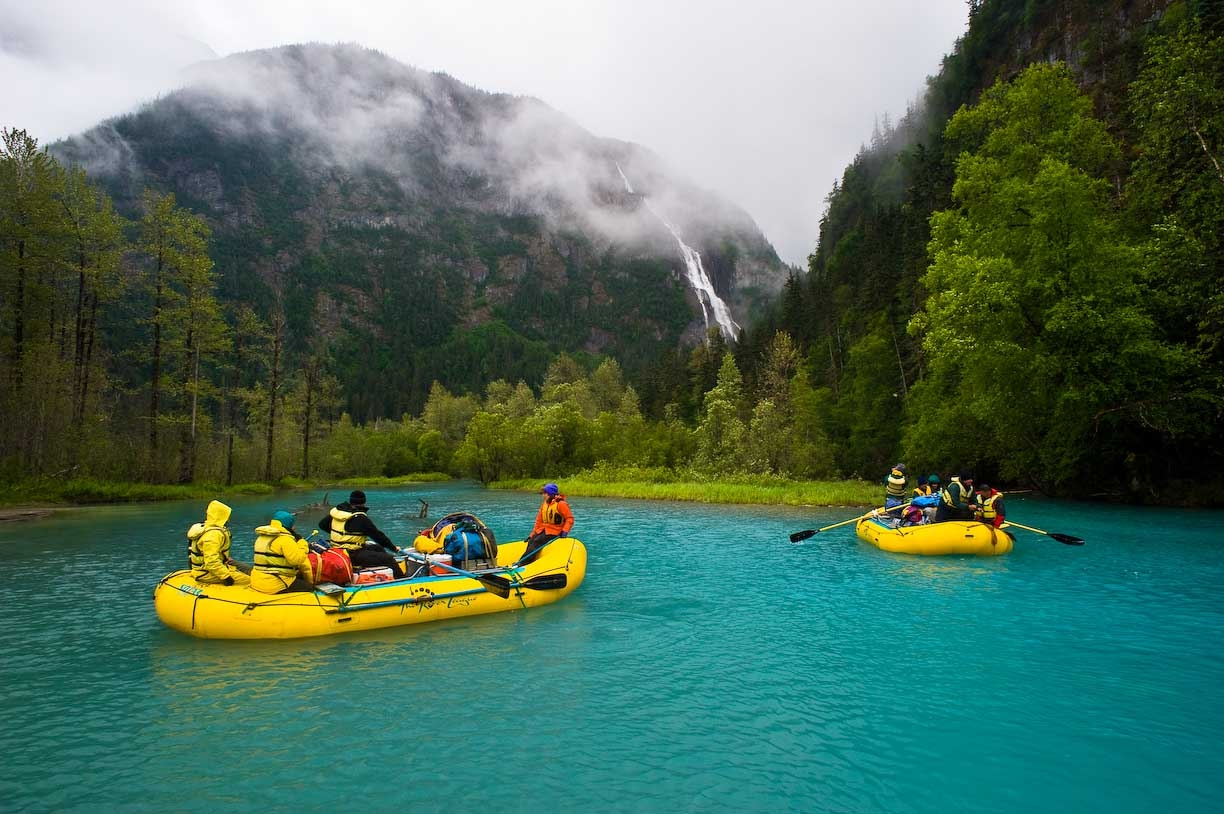
Waterfall on the Taku
