= Jennings River =

River in the country of Canada

Coordinates: 59°40′00″N 132°09′00″W

The Jennings River is a river in far northern British Columbia, Canada. It is approximately 150 kilometres (93 mi) long. The river was named for William T. Jennings (1846-1906), a civil engineer who, in 1897, assessed various road and railroad routes from the Pacific Ocean to the Yukon.

== Path ==
The Jennings River rises in the northern reaches of the Stikine Ranges of the Cassiar Mountains, at first running southwest, then turning northeast near the Tuya Range to enter Teslin Lake at its southern end, just to the east of the estuary of the Teslin River; also joining the lake in the same area is the Hayes River. The lower reaches of the Jennings form the boundary of the Nisutlin Plateau, which extends north into the Yukon along the eastern flank of Teslin Lake and to the west of the northernmost reaches of the Stikine Ranges; Simpson Peak is one of the few named summits in that region of the Stikines, and stands above the lower Jennings to the east of its estuary. To the south of the Jennings, west of the Tuya Range, is the Kawdy Plateau, which includes the small but rugged Atsutla Range, and southwest of which is the course of the Teslin River, which traverses the Kawdy, a subset of the Stikine Plateau, from south to north.

== Ecology ==
Black Spruce is a major tree in the Jennings River watershed; here the species is near the western limit of its range.

== See also ==
- Toozaza Peak
- List of rivers of British Columbia
