= Teslin River =

Coordinates: 61°34′37″N 134°53′55″W

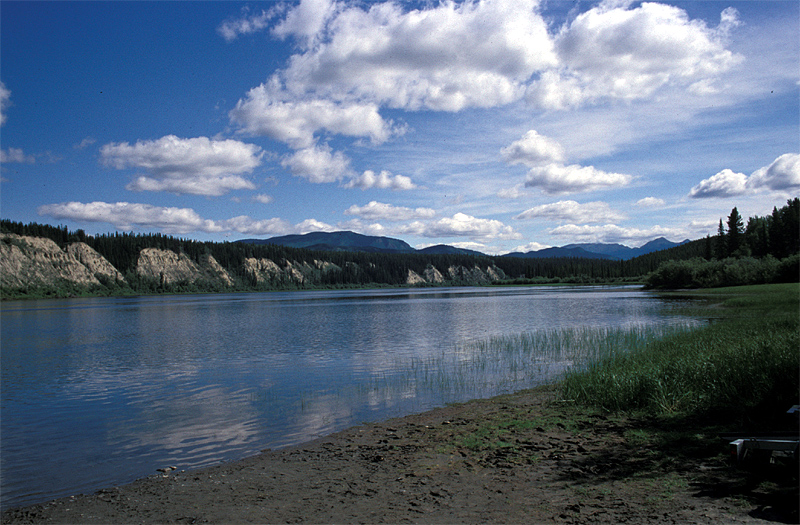
Teslin River at Johnson's crossing

The Teslin River is a river in southern Yukon Territory and northwestern British Columbia, Canada, that flows 632 kilometres (393 mi) from its source south of Teslin Lake to its confluence with the Yukon River.

During the Klondike Gold Rush of 1896–99, the river became a popular route to the Klondike gold fields near Dawson City with the stampeders who had crossed the Coast Mountains by routes such as the Chilkoot Trail or the White Pass trail.

The English name of the Teslin River is derived from native names. In the local Tutchone language. spoken north of the lake it was called Délin Chú and the Chilkat Tlingit called it Deisleen Héeni. In the Tlingit language the local kwaan or tribe of Inland Tlingit call themselves Deisleen Kwáan", meaning "Big Sinew Tribe". Prospectors and explorers passing through the region recorded that the local natives called the river Teslin-tuh or Teslin-too, from which we get the English name. The portion of the river upstream of the lake (south of the lake) was officially designated the Whiteswan River from 1904 to 1951. The other major feeder streams of the system, via Teslin Lake, are the Jennings River, from the southeast, and the Swift River, from the east-northeast.

Black Spruce is a significant tree within the Teslin River watershed.

== See also ==
- List of rivers of British Columbia
- List of rivers of Yukon
