= Nahlin Mountain =

Mountain in British Columbia, Canada

- Location within British Columbia
- Interactive map of Nahlin Mountain

Highest point
- Elevation: 1,972 m (6,470 ft)
- Prominence: 1,091 m (3,579 ft)
- Listing: Mountains of British Columbia
- Coordinates: 58°51′25″N 132°05′17″W

Geography
- Location: British Columbia, Canada
- District: Cassiar Land District
- Parent range: Interior Mountains
- Topo map: NTS 104K16 Teditua Creek

Nahlin Mountain is a mountain on the north side of the Nahlin River in far northwestern British Columbia, Canada.

== See also ==
- Nahlin Plateau
