= Iverson Creek (British Columbia) =

Creek in northern British Columbia, Canada

Coordinates: 59°37′8″N 130°9′53″W

Iverson Creek is a creek in northern British Columbia, Canada. It flows northeast into Toozaza Creek.
