= Taku River Tlingit First Nation =

The Taku River Tlingit First Nation are the band government of the Inland Tlingit in far northern British Columbia, Canada and also in Yukon. They comprise two ḵwaan (tribes) of the Tlingit people, who are otherwise coastal, the Áa Tlein Ḵwáan of the Atlin Lake area and the Deisleen Ḵwáan of Teslin Lake, whose main focus is the Teslin Tlingit Council in Teslin, Yukon. Their band offices are in Atlin, British Columbia, but follow Yukon Time (Mountain Standard Time (MST) UTC−07:00) year-round.

== Indian Reserves ==
Despite their presence in Yukon, all Taku River Tlingit Indian Reserves are located in British Columbia:

- Alkhili Indian Reserve No. 2, 2 miles east of Fourth of July Bay, Atlin Lake, 3 miles S of Atlin, 48.6 ha. 59°37′05″N 133°40′30″W
- Atlin-Teslin Indian Cemetery Indian Reserve No. 4, on the east shore of Atlin Lake one mile south of Atlin, 1.2 ha. 59°34′00″N 133°41′00″W
- Five Mile Point Indian Reserve No. 3, at Five Mile Point, east shore of Atlin Lake, S of Atlin, 881.40 ha. 59°30′00″N 133°40′00″W
- Jennings River Indian Reserve No. 8, east shore of Teslin Lake at the mouth of the Jennings River, 54.90 ha. 59°40′30″N 132°08′40″W
- McDonald Lake Indian Reserve No. 1, north end of McDonald Lake, 12 miles NE of Atlin, 48.60 ha. 59°44′00″N 133°33′00″W
- Silver Salmon Lake Indian Reserve No. 5, on the Silver Salmon River at the east end of Kuthai Lake east of the south end of Atlin Lake, 69.60 ha. 59°14′00″N 133°13′00″W
- Taku Indian Reserve No. 6, at the confluence of the Nakina and Silver Salmon Rivers, east of the south end of Atlin Lake, 15.20 ha. 59°07′00″N 133°00′00″W
- Teslin Lake Indian Reserve No. 7, at the south end of Teslin Lake, on the west shore north of the old Hudson's Bay Company trading post, 50.20 ha. 59°34′00″N 132°07′00″W
- Teslin Lake Indian Reserve No. 9, on west shore of Teslin Lake at the mouth of the Gladys River, 91.40 ha. 59°47′00″N 132°17′00″W
- Unnamed Indian Reserve No. 10, Atlin Townsite, 2.80 ha. 59°34′00″N 133°42′00″W

== See also ==
- History of the Tlingit
- List of First Nations governments in British Columbia
- Teslin Tlingit Council (in Yukon)
- Taku River/T'aḵú Téiú' Conservancy
