= Swift River (Teslin Lake) =

River in Canada, tributary of the Teslin lake

Coordinates: 59°44′00″N 132°11′00″W

The Swift River is a river that begins in Yukon Territory and flows southwest into British Columbia to its mouth at the east side of Teslin Lake on the Teslin River system. The river drains the uppermost portion of the Cassiar Mountains and in its lower reaches traverses the Nisutlin Plateau, which lies along the east side of Teslin Lake north of the mouth of the Jennings River, which is to the south of the Swift.

The river is one of two in British Columbia known as the Swift, the other of the same name is a tributary to the Cariboo River in the eastern parts of the region of the same name.

== See also ==
- List of rivers of British Columbia
- List of rivers of Yukon
- Little Rancheria River
- Rancheria River
- Toozaza Creek
