= Teslin Lake =

Lake in British Columbia and Yukon, Canada

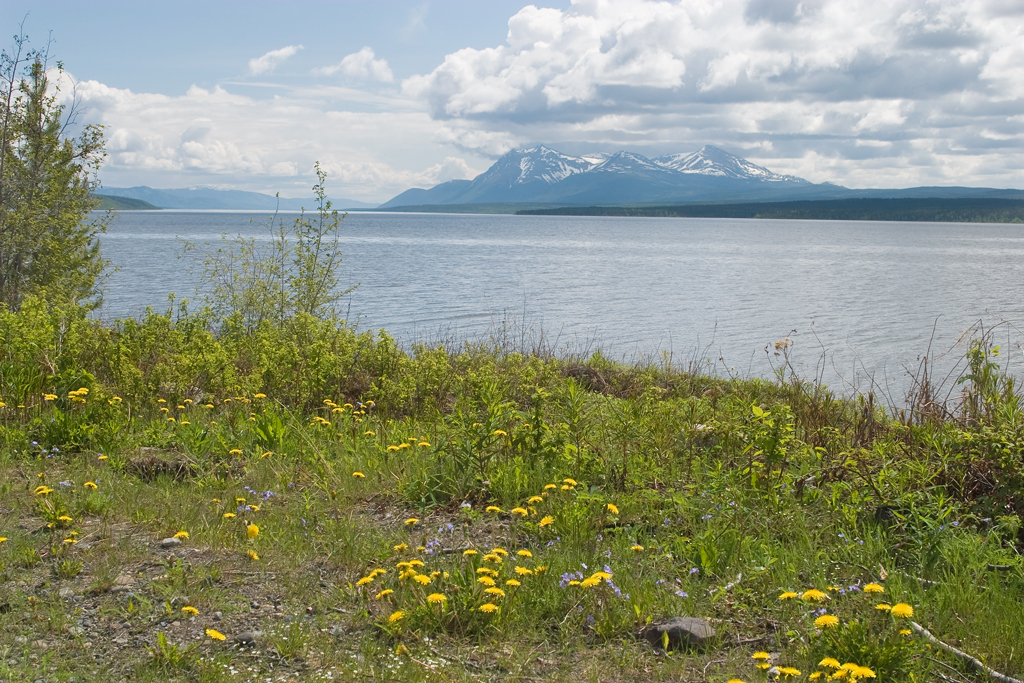

- Location within British Columbia
- Location: British Columbia/Yukon
- Coordinates: 60°1′N 132°26′W
- Primary inflows: Hayes River, Jennings River, Swift River, Teslin River
- Primary outflows: Teslin River
- Basin countries: Canada
- Max. length: 120 km (75 mi)
- Max. width: 5 km (3.1 mi)
- Surface area: 354 km^{2} (137 mi^{2})
- Average depth: 59 m (194 ft)
- Max. depth: 214 m (702 ft)
- Surface elevation: 684 m (2,244 ft)
- Settlements: Teslin

Teslin Lake is a large lake spanning the border between British Columbia and Yukon, Canada. It is one of a group of large lakes in the region of far northwestern BC, east of the upper Alaska Panhandle, which are the southern extremity of the basin of the Yukon River, and which are known in Yukon as "the Southern Lakes" (the other major ones in the group are Atlin Lake and Tagish Lake but include Bennett and Lindeman Lakes, the headwaters of the Yukon River itself). The lake is fed and drained primarily by the Teslin River, south and north, but is also fed from the east by the Jennings River and the Swift River, and from the west by the Hayes River.

According to the Yukon Geographical Names Project, "Teslin" means "long water", but in the Tlingit language the local kwaan or tribe of Tlingit is called Deisleen Kwáan", meaning "Big Sinew Tribe".

There are three Taku River Tlingit First Nation communities around the south end of the lake in British Columbia: Jennings River Indian Reserve No. 8, Teslin Lake Indian Reserve No. 7, and Teslin Lake Indian Reserve No. 9; in the same area there once was a Hudson's Bay Company trading post. On the Yukon portion of the lake there are three First Nation communities: Nisutlin Indian Reserve No. 14, Nisutlin Bay Indian Reserve No. 15, and the Teslin Tlingit Council. The latter is centred in the Village of Teslin, which is located where the Alaska Highway meets the lake, following its northern/eastern shore from there towards Whitehorse. The Nisutlin Plateau limns the eastern side of the lake north of the mouth of the Teslin River and extends into Yukon.

== See also ==
- List of lakes of British Columbia
