= Taku River =

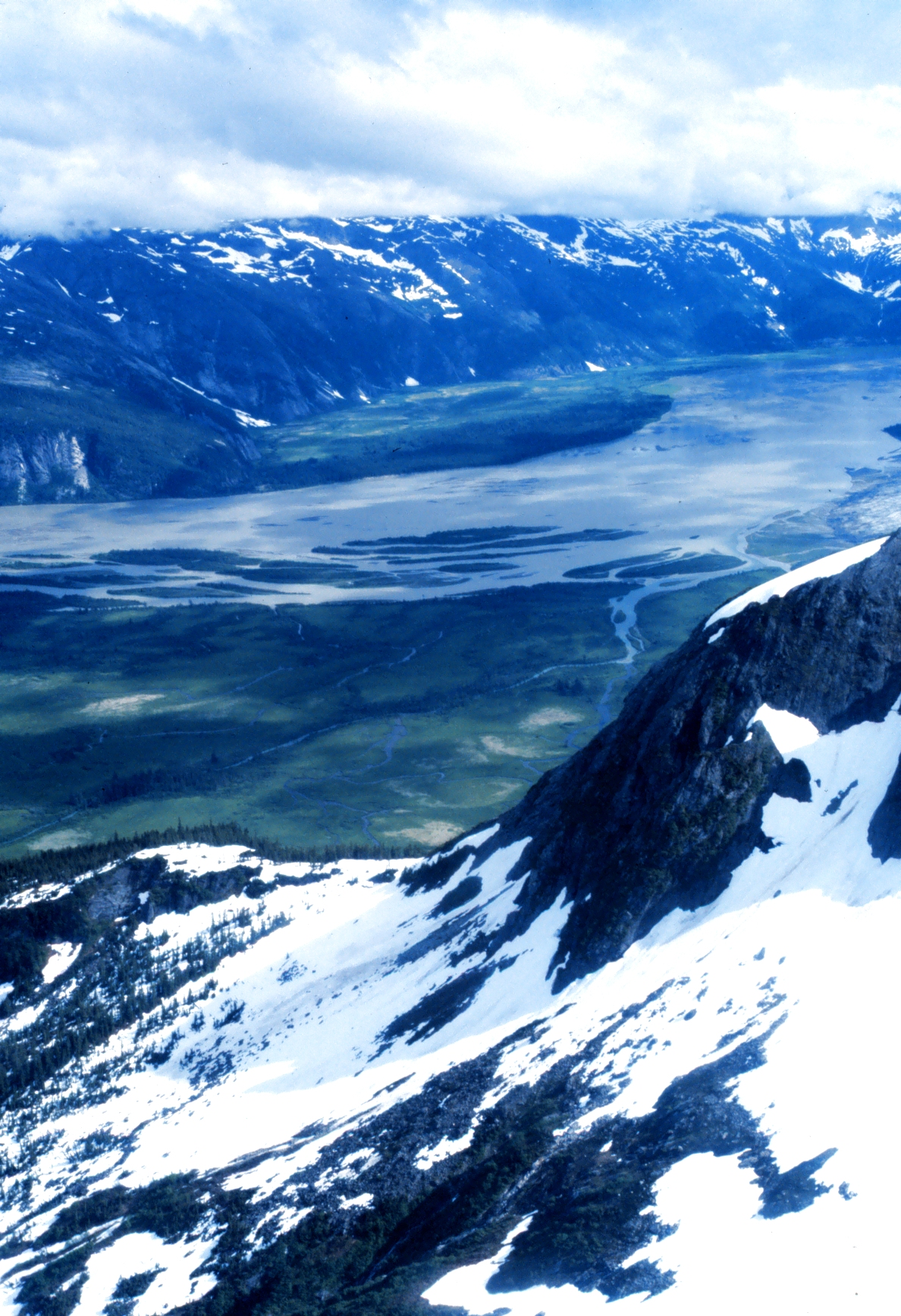
- Aerial view of the Taku River

- Location of the mouth of the Taku River in Alaska
- Etymology: Goose Flood
- Native name: T'aaḵu Héeni (Tlingit)

Location
- Country: Canada, United States
- State: Alaska
- Province: British Columbia

Physical characteristics
- Source: Inklin–Nakina confluence
- Mouth: Pacific Ocean
  - location: Stephens Passage, Alexander Archipelago, United States
  - coordinates: 58°25′35″N 133°58′38″W
- Length: 87 km (54 mi)
- Basin size: 27,500 km^{2} (10,600 sq mi)
- Discharge
  - average: 600 m^{3}/s (21,000 cu ft/s)

The Taku River (Tlingit: T’aaḵu Héeni) is a river running from British Columbia, Canada, to the northwestern coast of North America, at Juneau, Alaska. The river basin spreads across 27,500 square kilometres (10,600 sq mi). The Taku is a very productive salmon river and its drainage basin is primarily wilderness.

During the 18th and early 19th centuries, the Taku Indians controlled the trade routes on the river and compelled natives of the Interior to use them as middle-men, instead of allowing trade directly with white settlers.

The Hudson's Bay Company established a trading post called Fort Durham, also known as Fort Taku, near the mouth of the Taku River in the early 1840s to take advantage of the natural trade route. However, by 1843, Fort Durham had been abandoned as unprofitable.

Although a major river, the Taku's name does not extend to its headwaters. Its name begins at the confluence of the Inklin and Nakina Rivers, which is the location of the tiny community of Inklin. The Inklin's name also only extends upstream to the confluence of the Nahlin and Sheslay Rivers, which the Nakina's main tributaries are the Sloko and Silver Salmon Rivers.

One account of its name is that "Taku" is the Tlingit language word for "salmon" but the Taku Tlingit name for themselves T’aaḵu Ḵwáan translates to "Geese Flood Upriver Tribe"". There are also three kwaans of the Tlingit people: Taku Kwaan, Yenyeidi, wolf clan "own" Taku watershed, originating from yen hidi, 12 miles s/e of Juneau, a coastal clan, NOT inland in British Columbia, the Áa Tlein Ḵwáan ("Big Lake Tribe", today organized as the Taku River Tlingit First Nation) and the Deisleen Ḵwáan ("Big Sinew Tribe", today organized as the Teslin Tlingit Council); the territory of the former includes those areas of the Taku basin in British Columbia.

== Tributaries ==
The Taku's main tributaries are as follows, listed hierarchically in ascending order from its mouth:

- Wright River
- Sittakanay River
- Tulsequah River
- Inklin River
  - Sutlahine River
  - Nahlin River
    - Dudidontu River
      - Kakuchuya Creek
        - Matsatu Creek
    - Koshin River
      - Kaha Creek
      - Lost Creek
    - Megatushon Creek
  - Sheslay River
    - Samotua River
    - Hackett River
      - Egnell Creek
- Nakina River
  - Sloko River
    - Nakonake River
  - Silver Salmon River

== Economic value ==
The Taku River is an important contributor to the economies of Southeast Alaska and British Columbia, especially for its commercial, sport and personal-use fisheries. A detailed report released in 2004 by the McDowell Group notes $5.4 million in total U.S. commercial harvest and processing output, including 80 jobs and $1.4 million in labor income. British Columbia added over $750,000 more.

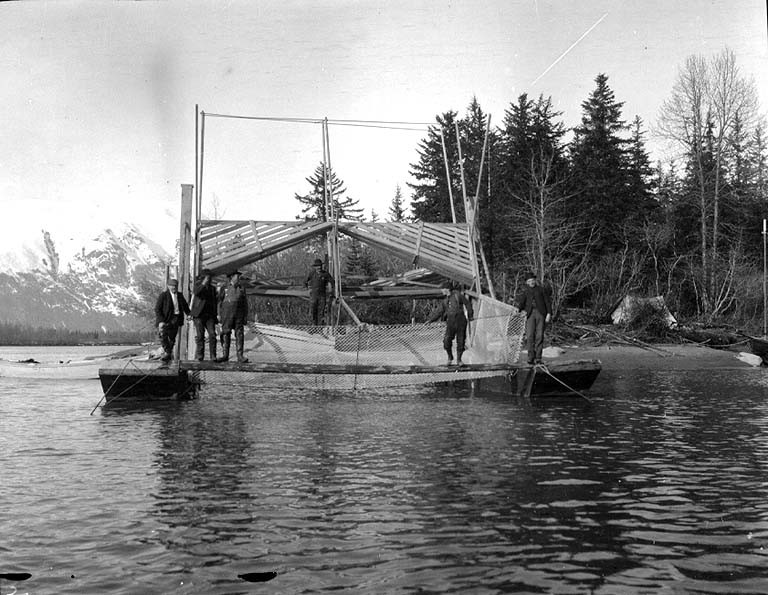
Fishwheel on the Taku River, May 1908

Other activities, including commercial air, guided river excursions, hunting and property taxes added still more to the general regional economy. the report mentioned above estimated "the annual economic impact from all activities on the Taku River to be $26.7 million," most of it, about $18 million, from commercial air activity directly related to tourism.

The Taku is the Southeast Alaska's top salmon-producing river. Data from the Alaska Department of Fish & Game notes that nearly 2 million wild salmon return to the river annually, including up to 100,000 Chinook salmon (king salmon), 350,000 sockeye salmon (red salmon) and 400,000 coho salmon (silver salmon), 50,000 chum salmon(dog salmon), and 1 million pink salmon (humpy salmon). Beyond its bounty of salmon, the Taku is home to eight other fish species, including steelhead, bull trout, Dolly Varden char, rainbow trout, lake trout, Arctic grayling, whitefish and Southeast Alaska's largest population of cutthroat trout. In addition, hooligans (eulachon), crab, shrimp and halibut are harvested at or near the river's mouth. That marine wealth supports major sport, commercial and tribal fisheries in Alaska and British Columbia.

== Flooding history ==
Periodically, the Taku River reaches flood stage (43 ft) or above. Records of the Advanced Hydrologic Prediction Service (AHPS), a branch of the National Weather Service, show that in the last two decades the river crested above 43 feet (13 m) six times. The highest level reached in that period was 45.07 feet (13.74 m) on June 25, 2004. As of August 12, 2009, the highest registered level for 2009 occurred on July 24 when the river crested at 43.17 feet (13.16 m).

The Taku River fills Tulsequah Lake during peak flow, causing lake outburst events most years. As the lake swells the water can float or melt the glacier enough to trigger sudden releases.

== Habitat protection efforts ==
Past mining activity and the potential for future mining on the Canadian side of the border led the State of Alaska to take recent habitat protection steps. In January 2009, the Alaska Department of Natural Resources' Division of Coastal and Ocean Management approved a request from the Alaska Department of Fish and Game to designated the entire U.S. portion of the Taku River as "important habitat," a designation that put the stretch of river within the purview of protective provisions in Alaska law that require those applying for certain river use permits "avoid, minimize, or mitigate significant adverse impacts to the special productivity of the habitat." In February, the director of the division rescinded the designation for a portion of the U.S. river below the Canada–United States border. The important habitat designation remains in place, however, for a 16-mile (26 km) section beginning at the river's mouth near Juneau, Alaska. Several organizations are working to win further habitat conservation protections for the river, including Rivers Without Borders and the Alaska Marine Conservation Council.

In 2022, the Taku River Tlingit First Nation declared the Taku River watershed to be a protected area, protecting the area from mining and other extractive resource development.

== See also ==
- List of rivers of Alaska
- List of rivers of British Columbia
- Stikine Territory
- Taku, British Columbia
- Rivers Without Borders

== News ==
- Juneau Empire, (June 18, 2009) opinion, My Turn: "Palin should seize Taku opportunity"
- Juneau Empire, ( July 12, 2009) story: "Palin urges Canadians to address mine's acid drainage"
- Juneau Empire, (July 19, 2009) story: "Bridging the gap: Conservation and commercial fishing"
- Juneau empire, (July 24, 2009) story: "Taku River flooding could near record"
- The Globe Mail, (July 28, 2009) Column: "Palin's parting words to B.C.: 'Don't spill baby, don't spill"
- Yukon News, July 31, 2009, story: "Redcorp's bankruptcy threatens salmon-rich Taku"
- Juneau Empire, (Aug. 17, 2009) story: "Spawning grounds stock derby catch: State biologists collect salmon data with fish wheels, spaghetti tags"
- Juneau Empire, (Aug. 31, 2009) opinion, Letter: "Parnell should make Taku River a priority"
- http://takuriver.com/rivernews.htm
