= Nahlin River =

Coordinates: 58°47′00″N 132°05′00″W

The Nahlin River is a river in far northwestern British Columbia, Canada, flowing northwest to meet the Sheslay River, forming there the commencement of the Inklin River, the main southeast fork of the Taku.

The main tributaries of the Nahlin River include the Dudidontu River and the Koshin River.

== See also ==
- List of rivers of British Columbia
- Nahlin Mountain
- Nahlin Plateau
