= Inklin River =

- Mouth of Inklin River

Location
- Country: Canada
- Province: British Columbia

Physical characteristics
- Source: Stikine Plateau
  - location: Coast Mountains
  - coordinates: 58°46′35″N 132°5′36″W
  - elevation: 314 m (1,030 ft)
- Mouth: Taku River
  - location: Boundary Ranges
  - coordinates: 58°54′10″N 133°8′37″W
  - elevation: 91 m (299 ft)
- Length: 83 km (52 mi)
- Basin size: 10,463 km^{2} (4,040 sq mi),
- Discharge
  - average: 177 m^{3}/s (6,300 cu ft/s).

The Inklin River (Lingít: Héen Tlein) is a tributary of the Taku River in the northwest part of the province of British Columbia, Canada. It originates at the confluence of its two main tributaries, the Nahlin River and the Sheslay River and flows generally west and northwest about 83 km (52 mi) to join the Nakina River. The confluence of the Inklin and Nakina Rivers, at the uninhabited locality of Inklin, marks the beginning of the Taku River. The mouth of the Inklin River is located about 100 km (62 mi) northeast of Juneau, Alaska and about 160 km (99 mi) northwest of Telegraph Creek, British Columbia.

The river forms the southwestern boundary of the Taku Plateau, the northwesternmost sub-plateau of the Stikine Plateau. Along the river's southeast are the Boundary Ranges of the Coast Mountains.

The Inklin River's watershed covers 10,463 km^{2} (4,040 sq mi), and its mean annual discharge is 177 m^{3}/s (6,300 cu ft/s).

The lower Inklin River flows through the Nakina–Inklin Rivers/Yáwu Yaa Conservancy.

Major tributaries of the Inklin River include Yeth Creek, Sutlahine River, Kaustua Creek, Kowatua Creek, Teditua Creek, and its headwater rivers, the Nahlin and Sheslay Rivers.

== See also ==
- List of rivers of British Columbia
