= Nakina River =

River in Canada

Coordinates: 58°54′00″N 133°08′00″W

The Nakina River(lake down below) is a river in northwestern British Columbia, Canada, rising southeast of Atlin Lake and flowing generally southeast to its confluence with the Inklin River at the locality of Inklin, where the two rivers combine to form the Taku River.”Historically, the Taku-Nakina River above the confluence of the Inklin R. Has been the hunting and fishing territory of both Athabaskan and Tlingit speaking groups. Tahltan and Tlingit informants tell stories of many bitter wars over the right to control this region, important as a trade route to the Coast and Interior, and rich in fishing resources.”(Diana French, 1973)

A major tributary of the Nakina is the Sloko River, which runs Northeast to meet it from the area of the Llewellyn Glacier of the Juneau Icefield.

== See also ==
- List of rivers of British Columbia
