= Kawdy Plateau =

Plateau in British Columbia, Canada

- Plateau
- Location within British Columbia
- Coordinates: 59°15′N 131°30′W
- Location: British Columbia
- Part of: Stikine Plateau

The Kawdy Plateau is a plateau in northern British Columbia, Canada, located between the Nahlin and Tuya Rivers. It includes the granitic Atsutla Range and Nazcha Hills and the volcanic Kawdy Mountain.

== See also ==
- List of plateaus in British Columbia
