= Atlin =

Atlin may either be:

- Atlin Lake, one of British Columbia's largest lakes
- Atlin, British Columbia, a town in the far northwest of British Columbia, named for the lake, centre of a Klondike-era gold rush
- Atlin Road, road in Yukon and British Columbia
- Atlin District, the name for the region including Atlin, and also of a formal mining district of nearly the same territory
- Atlin (electoral district), a defunct provincial electoral district in British Columbia
- Atlin Provincial Park and Recreation Area, a provincial park in British Columbia
- Comox—Atlin, a defunct federal electoral district in British Columbia
- Atlin Volcanic Field, a geological area

== See also ==
- Atlin Mountain, near Atlin Lake
- Mount Atlin, now renamed Mount London
