= Atlin Arts & Music Festival =

- Genre: All Genres
- Dates: July 11–13, 2025
- Frequency: Annually
- Venue: Tarahne Park
- Location: Atlin, British Columbia
- Country: Canada
- Years active: 2003–present
- Inaugurated: July 11–13, 2003
- Most recent: July 11–13, 2025
- Attendance: 1500 (2025)
- Website: www.atlinfest.ca
- 17th Season

The Atlin Arts & Music Festival (AAMF) is an annual arts and music festival located in Atlin, British Columbia. The festival has hosted such notable acts as Gord Downie, The Sadies, Michelle Wright, Sloan, Delhi 2 Dublin, Iskwé, Hawksley Workman, Rock Plaza Central, Harpoonist & The Axe Murderer, David Lindley, Bruce Cockburn, The Joel Plaskett Emergency, Dan Mangan, Said The Whale, Ian Tyson, David Grisman, Holly McNarland, Dave Bidini, Danny Michel, Alex Cuba, Emm Gryner, and David Francey. It also features an array of visual artists, independent films, artisan vendors, and a range of art and music workshops.

At its peak size, AAMF drew over 3,000 festival goers, including roughly 300 volunteers, to Atlin. This led considerable strain on the community, which has less than 500 permanent residents, so in recent years, the number of available tickets has been reduced. The Yukon Ski Patrol provides First Aid services at the festival. Most years, the festival is commenced by the Taku Ḵwáan Dancers (People of the Taku), a group of local Taku River Tlingit traditional First Nations dancers.

The Atlin Arts & Music Festival also draws many musical artists based in or from the Yukon perform at the festival, including Sarah MacDougall, Major Funk & The Employment, Calla Kinglit, Patrick Jacobson, Speed Control, Gordie Tentrees, Kevin Barr and his son Jonah Barr's band "Old Cabin", Fawn Fritzen, Nicole Edwards, Declan O'Donovan, Ben Mahoney, Claire Ness, Ivan Coyote, Diyet, Soda Pony, Kim Beggs, Ryan McNally, Cryptozoologists, and Soir de Semaine. The festival features a varied line-up when it comes to music genres including rock, jazz, hip hop, folk, country, blues, zydeco, electronica, Americana, heavy metal, bluegrass, power pop, and indie music.

== List of Performing Artists by Year ==
=== 2003 ===
Jerry Alfred, Annie Avery & Xylomaniacs, Kim Beggs/Bodra Elia, Clay Cliff Ramblers, Kuster’s Last Band, Natalie Edelson & High Nose Lily, Nicole Edwards, Anne Louise Genest, Beth & Mark Larsen, Heather Loewen, Paul Lucas, Ben Mahoney & the Big-eyed Beans from Venus, Dave Manning, Nemesis, Lana Rae, Lis Saya & Friends, Scratch, Steve Slade, Throwing Rocks, Thorn Twixt Two Roses, Gordie Tentrees and the Groove Maniacs

- Dates: July 11–13, 2003

=== 2004 ===
Gary Comeau, Soir de Semaine, Soultree, Quatrain, Dave Manning & Neighborhood Conspiracy, Alaskan Village Band, Ashley Ahrens, Paul Lucas Jazz Trio, Marty Waldman, Brenda Berezan, Ed Anderson, Frank Hoorn, Scott Arnold, Heather Loewen, Natalie Edelson & High-Nose Lily, Sisters of Evolution w/Dianne Allen, Kim Barlow, BJ McLean, The Bootskreefers, Kuster’s Last Band, Annie Avery Jazz Trio, Raw Element, Kevin Barr, The Meatstrips, Simple Messengers: Pete & Mary Beattie & Art Johns, Gilbert & Willie Campbell, Andy Quock & Orville Brown

- Dates: July 9–11, 2004

=== 2005 ===
Mae Moore & Lester Quitzau, Ivonne Hernandez, Down to the Wood, Leela Gilday, Chester Knight, Shutterfly, Ecos Nativos, Soir de Semaine, Whammer Jammer Band, Swingin’ Fish Nuggets, Art Johns & Kevin Barr, Bingo Bongo Boogie Band, Barb Chamberlain & Friends

- Dates: July 8–10, 2005

=== 2006 ===
Creaking Tree String Quartet, Terry Tufts, Ugly Stick, Don Alder, Ceilidh Friends, Leslie Alexander, John Spearn, Bluegrass 101, Jay Gilday, Gumboots, Bobs & Lolo, Ken Waldman, Deja Blue, Simple Messengers, Brenda Berezan, Gordie Tentrees, Canyon Mountain Boys, Kate Weekes, NESKA

- Dates: July 7–9, 2006

=== 2007 ===
David Francey, Bebop Cowboys, Hot Toddy, M’Girl, Tamara Nile, John Spearn, Ugly Stick, Melwood Cutlery, Mike Stevens, Alaska String Band, The Cracker Cats, Andrew White, Donegone Stringband, Gary Comeau, Ed Peekeekoot, Jay Gilday, Steve Slade, Shiloh Lindsay, Tlingit First Nation Drummer Dancers, Soir de Semaine, Mamaguroove, Joanna Chapman-Smith, Didier Delahaye, Ben Mahoney, Yukon Jack, Melisa Devost

- Dates: July 6–8, 2007

=== 2008 ===
~~Ashley MacIsaac~~ (cancelled), The McDades, Anne Louise Genest, Canyon Mointain Boys, Don Freed, Evelyn Parry, Genticorum, Headwater, Julie Blue, Kim Beggs, M’Girl, Mike Stevens & Ray McLean, Random Order, Ray Bonneville, Ryan Leblanc, Ryan McNally, Ssasi, Searson, Sisters of Evolution, The Big Band, The Gumboots, Taku River Tlingit Dancers

- Dates: July 11–13, 2008

=== 2009 ===
Colin Linden, Stephen Fearing, Twilight Hotel, Reveillons!, Delhi 2 Dublin, Patty Larkin, Headwater, CaneFire, LIttle Toby Walker, George McConkey, M'Girl, Kevin Barr & Blue Eagle, South Thunderbird, Mamaguroove, Ed Peekeekoot, Rossi & The Boys

- Dates: July 10–12, 2009

=== 2011 ===
Tom Jackson, Annabelle Chvostek, Tanya Tagaq, Madison Violet, Charlie A'Court, Taku Ḵwáan Dancers, Home Sweet Home, Oona McOuat & Dream Deep, Jim Bianco, Bushwhacker, Headwater, Claire Ness, Fiddleheads, Maria in the Shower, Mr. Something Something, Traveler, Jesse Zubot, Sharon Shorty, Second Cousins, The August Arrival, Nicole Bauberger, Annie Avery, Kevin Barr, Brett Dillingham

- Dates: July 8–10, 2011

=== 2012 ===
David Grisman FolkJazz Trio, David Lindley, Jim Hurst, Gary Comeau & The Voodoo Allstars, Del Barber, Don Amero, Dwayne Cōté & Duane Andrews, Sarah MacDougall Band, Annie Lou, Jonathan Byrd, Élage Diouf, Pacific Curls, Declan O'Donovan, The Lovely Drifters, Big Soul, Ivan Coyote, Art Johns, Tammi Josie, Taku Kwáan Dancers

- Dates: July 6–8, 2012

=== 2013 ===
Harry Manx, The Gibson Brothers, Hawksley Workman, Michelle Wright, Mike Stevens, Gordie MacKeeman and the Rhythm Boys, Celso Machado, Trent Severn, Kevin Breit, Emm Gryner, The Boom Booms, Silver Screen Scoundrels, The Michael Woods Band, Steve Brokley Band, Soir de Semaine, Brenda Berezan & the Free Radicals, The Crooked Brothers, Richard van Camp, Miche Genest, Dakhká Khwáan Dancers

- Dates: July 12–14, 2013

=== 2014 ===
Gord Downie, The Sadies, Danny Michel, Dave Bidini, David Francey, Alex Cuba, Alexis Normand, Ashley Condon, Brass Knuckle Society, Dennis Allen, Good for Grapes, Gordie Tentrees, Gord Grdina, Old Cabin, Pharis and Jason Romero, Possessed by Paul James, Ryan McNally, Sauna Music, Speed Control, Steve Poltz, The Midnight Sons, Dead Simple, 86 Young Gunz, MC Turmoil and Super Daver

- Dates: July 11–13, 2014

=== 2015 ===
Ian Tyson, James Keelaghan, Death, Danny Michel Trio, California Feetwarmers, Anna & Elizabeth, Bongeziwe Mabandla, Carper Family, Claire Ness, Dana Sipos, Devon Sproule, Diyet, Good For Grapes, Michael Feurerstack, Pinetop Ramblers, Soda Pony

- Dates: July 10–12, 2015

=== 2016 ===
Bruce Cockburn, Tim O'Brien, Old Man Leuedecke, Harpoonist & The Axe Murderer, Anger Management, Average Joe, Blackberry Wood, Ghostkeeper, Layten Kramer, Manfred Janssen & Krankshaft, Nefe, Old Cabin, Olympic Symphonium, Pamyua, Paul Lucas, Ryan McNally, Sarah MacDougall, Scott Maynard

- Dates: July 8–10, 2016

=== 2017 ===
Joel Plaskett Emergency / Joel & Bill Plaskett, Ben Caplan, Rose Cousins, Iskwé, Moe Clark, Sweet Alibi, Matt Epp, Speed Control, Declan O'Donovan, Gordie Tentrees, Patrick Jacobson, Major Funk and the Employment, Calla Kinglit, Claire Ness, Ukes of Hazard, DJ Dash, Nicole Edwards, Two Piano Tornado, Antarticus, Vanier Senior Jazz Band, Taku Ḵwáan Dancers & Dakhká Khwáan Dancers

- Dates: July 7–9, 2017

=== 2018 ===
Sloan, Willie Nile, Roy Forbes, The Dungarees, Raine Hamilton, Ivan Coyote & Sarah MacDougall, Sarah MacDougall, Ivan Coyote, Diyet and the Love Soldiers, Twin Peaks, Speed Control, Ryan McNally, Sho Sho Esquiro, Slin, Nive and the Deer Children, Soir de Semaine, When We Dance We Dance Together, Fawn Fritzen and David Restivo, The Whiskeydicks, Rock Plaza Central, The Quiet Revolution, Swinging Pines, Jasmine Sudlow, Michael Martyn, Oclaire, Ben Hermann, Carmen Braden, New North Collective, Drea Naysayer, Taku Ḵwáan Dancers

- Dates: July 6–8, 2018

=== 2019 ===
Said the Whale, Dan Mangan, Terra Lightfoot, Taku Ḵwáan Dancers, DJ Shub, Prairie Dogs, Terra Lightfoot, Holly McNarland, Ivan Coyote, Dena Zagi, L'il Andy, The Heels, Local Boy, Communism, Sho Sho Esquiro, Sarah MacDougall, Tiller's Folly, Jack Duncan Band, Bob Log III, Vision Quest, The New Customs, The Shaggy Manes, Winter Trio, Steve Benoit, Claire Ness and the Swing Sets, Ukulele Russ, Dana Jennejohn and the Bennett Sun, Community Service

- Dates: July 12–14, 2019

=== 2025 ===
The Sadies, The Grapes of Wrath, Cat Clyde, Limblifter, Kacy & Clayton, Valdy, Danny Michel, The Surfrajettes, Steven and the Evens, Digawolf, Spencer Burton, Tiller’s Folly, Rich Hope, Jay Gilday, James Murdoch, Naomi Kavka, Joel Battle, Joey O’Neil, Bria Rose N’ Thorns, Kingswardfish, Hendrika, Unicorn Parts, Squirrelhunter, The BandShe, Caleb Tomlinson and the Perseids, Maddie B-Traplin, Norman Foote, Miranda Currie, Claire Ness, Peggy Hanifan

- Dates: July 11–13, 2025

== History ==
The Atlin Arts & Music Festival was founded in January 2003, and in July of that year 800 people attended the inaugural event. Attendance in later years reached up to 3,500 people. No festival took place in 2010.

The festival was cancelled in 2020 and 2021 due to the COVID-19 pandemic, and then was re-evaluated based on a community survey done in 2022. The festival returns in 2025 after a five year hiatus.

== Stages ==
The main festival grounds are located in Tarahne Park near Atlin Lake, one of the largest natural lakes in British Columbia. There are three main stages in Atlin that are in use during the festival: The Park Stage, The Lake Stage, and The Globe Theatre.

== See also ==
- Atlin, British Columbia
- Music of Yukon
