= Susan James =

Susan James may refer to:

- Susan James (midwife) (born 1953), Canadian nurse and midwife
- Susan James (philosopher) (born 1951), British philosopher
- Susan Saint James (born 1946), American actress and activist
- Susan James, a pen name of Rochelle Alers (born 1963), American writer of romance novels
- Susan James (musician), American singer-songwriter
