= The Echo (venue) =

American music venue

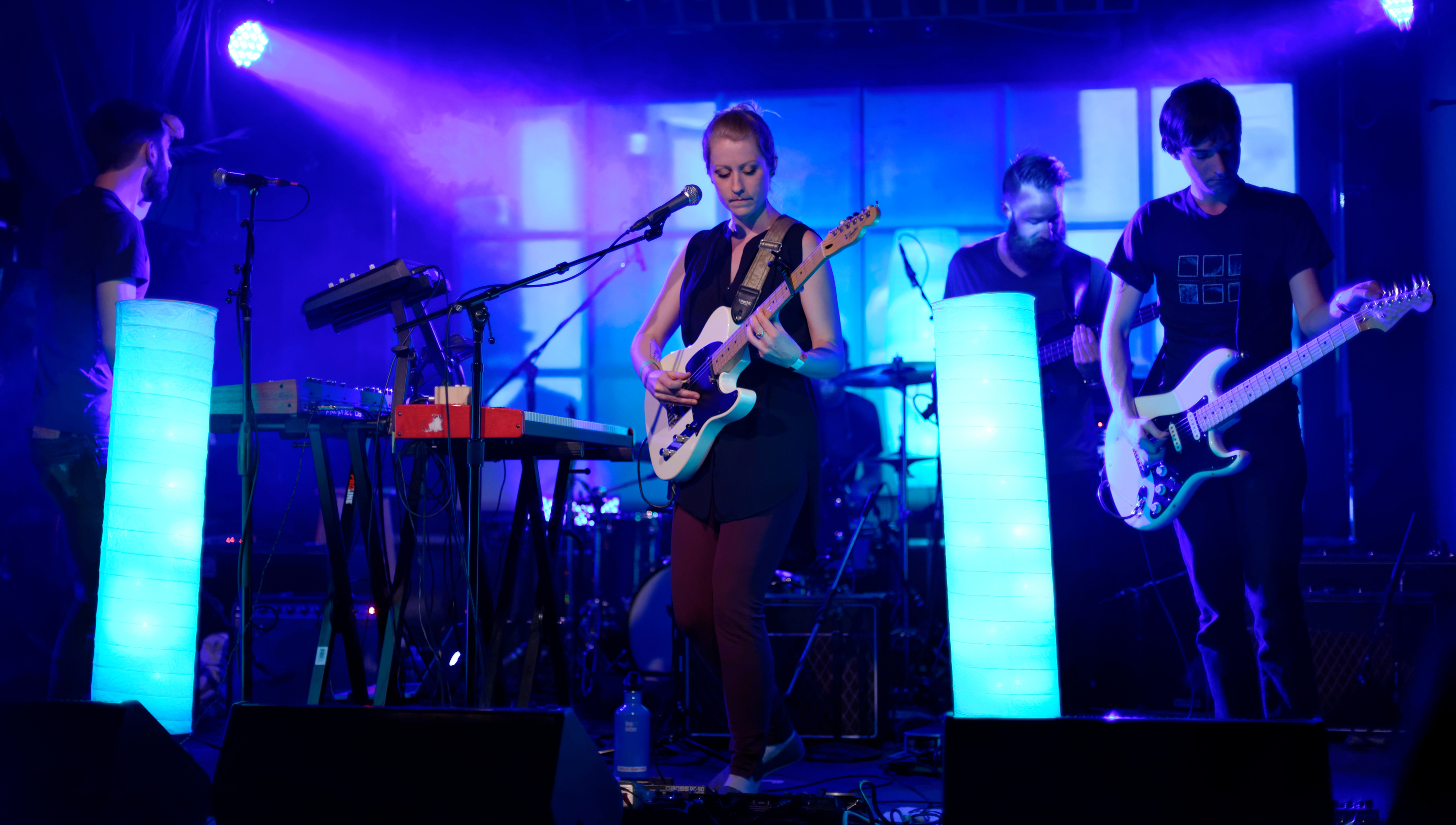
- Hotel Cinema performing live at The Echo in Echo Park (Los Angeles) California on Saturday April 5th, 2014.
- Interactive map of The Echo
- Address: 1822 W. Sunset Blvd., Los Angeles, CA 90026
- Location: Echo Park, Los Angeles, California, United States
- Coordinates: 34°4′40″N 118°15′36″W
- Capacity: 350
- Type: Concert venue and nightclub

Construction
- Opened: 2001

Website
- www.theecho.com

The Echo is an American music venue and nightclub, located in the Echo Park neighborhood of Los Angeles, California. For 14 years, it hosted Funky Sole, an all-vinyl 1960s funk-and-soul dance party. The venue is also known for their punk rock shows.

== History ==
The Echo opened in 2001. Prior to that, the space was used as a Latin-themed restaurant/nightclub. The front of the building still sports the original name "Nayarit."

In 2019, it was announced that Spaceland Productions, who owned and operated The Echo, The Echoplex, and other venues, was sold to Live Nation Entertainment.

== Notable performers ==
=== Individuals ===
- Bad Gyal
- Beck
- Billie Eilish
- Casiotone for the Painfully Alone
- Cold Cave
- Daedelus
- Dntel
- Flea (musician)
- Janani K. Jha
- John Vanderslice
- Jesse Rutherford
- Lady Sovereign
- Mac Demarco
- Maria Taylor
- Nite Jewel
- Olivia Rodrigo
- Rachel Chinouriri
- Elliott Smith
- St. Vincent

=== Groups ===
- Air Traffic
- The Airborne Toxic Event
- An Albatross
- Autolux
- Bad Religion
- Balu Brigada
- Band of Horses
- The Blasters
- The Decemberists
- Deerhoof
- The Elected
- FIDLAR
- The Flesh Eaters
- Fool's Gold
- Foster the People
- Germs
- GoGoGo Airheart
- Gravy Train!!!!
- I Love You but I've Chosen Darkness
- I See Hawks in L.A.
- Jenny Lewis with the Watson Twins
- LCD Soundsystem
- Love with Johnny Echols
- Lucero
- Pixies
- Psapp
- Rancid
- The Rolling Stones
- Say Hi
- Spiritualized
- The Subhumans
- The Surfrajettes
- Thao & The Get Down Stay Down
- The Violet Lights
- Wolf Eyes
- Yawning Man
- X

== In popular culture ==
The 2009 film Crossing Over starring Harrison Ford, Sean Penn, Ashley Judd, and Ray Liotta shot scenes on location at The Echo nightclub in Echo Park.

== See also ==
- Architecture of the United States
- Echoplex, another Los Angeles music venue owned by the same people as The Echo
- List of buildings and structures
- Music of Los Angeles
- Spaceland, another nightclub in Los Angeles
