= Atlin River =

River in British Columbia, Canada

Coordinates: 59°37′20″N 133°51′12″W

The Atlin River (Lingít: Áa Tlein Héeni) is a river located in the Atlin/Áa Tlein Téix'i Provincial Park in the Canadian province of British Columbia. It flows out from Atlin Lake.

== See also ==
- List of rivers of British Columbia
