= Atlin Road =

Highway in Canada

Coordinates: 60.000°N 133.7943°W

Atlin Road
- Yukon Highway 7 British Columbia Unsigned Highway 910:3613
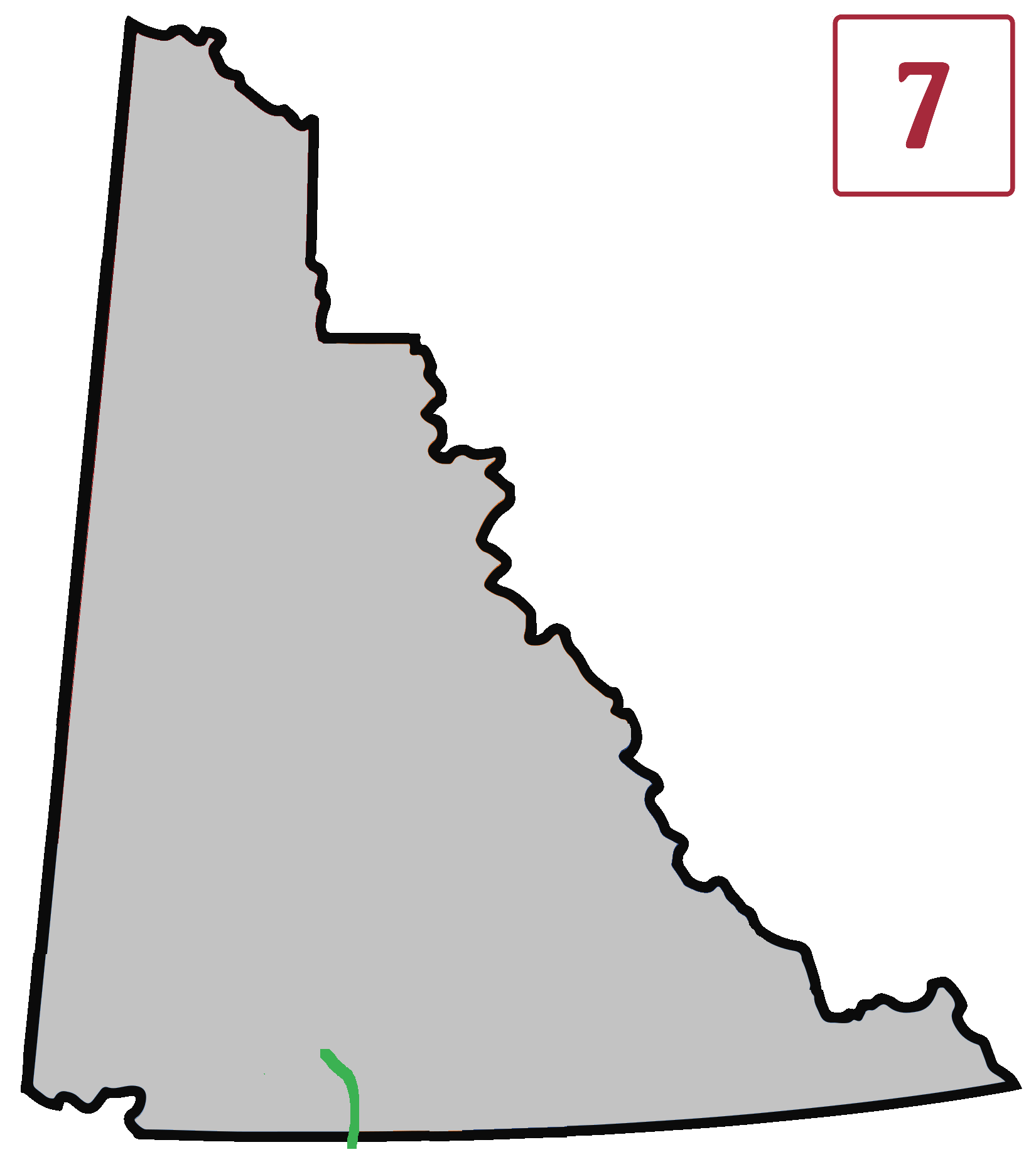

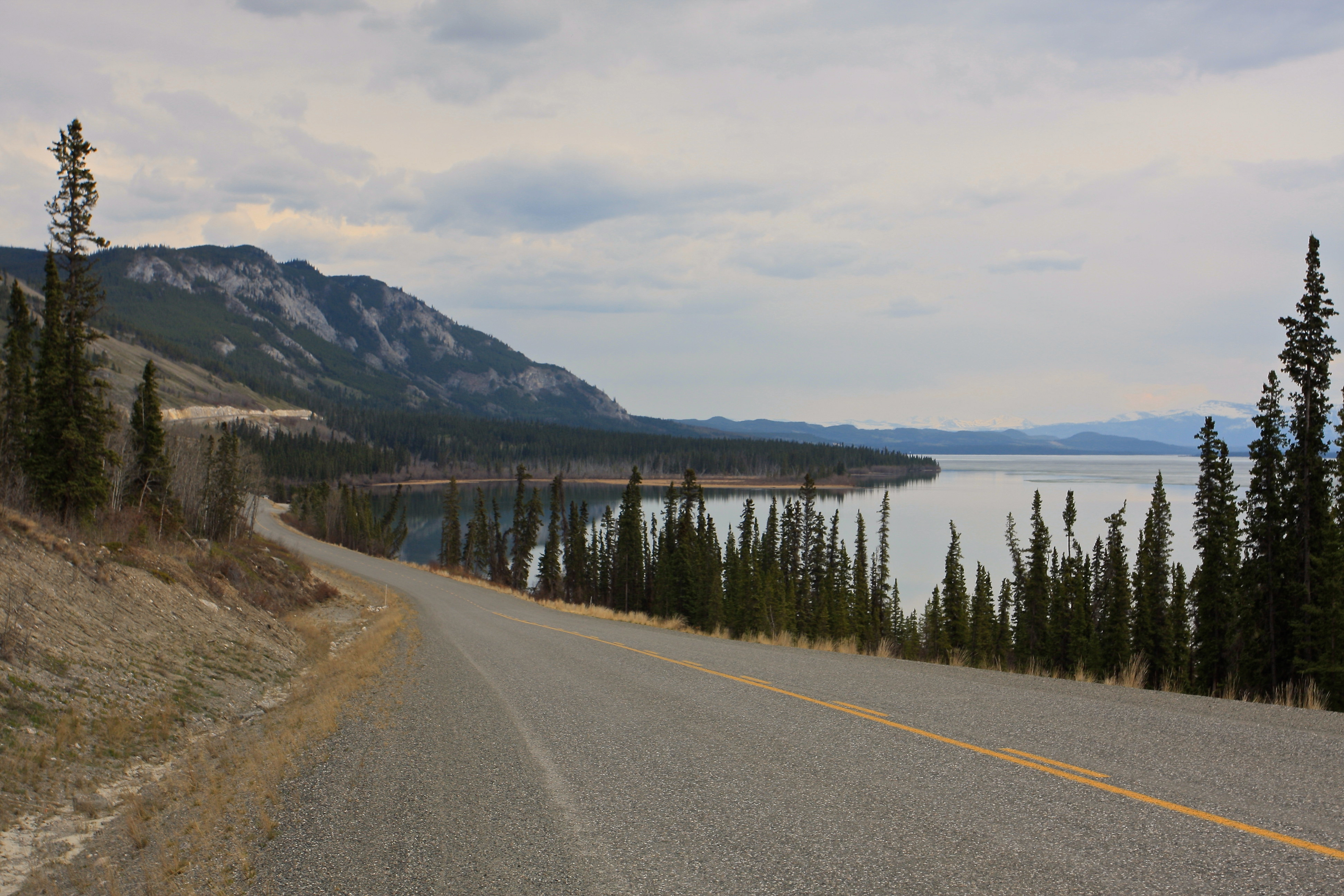

Route information
- Maintained by Department of Highways and Public Works
- Length: 91.8 km (57.0 mi) YT-7: 42.4 km (26.3 mi); BC-910:3613
- Existed: 1949–present

Major junctions
- South end: Discovery Ave in Atlin
- North end: Hwy 8 near Jakes Corner

Location
- Country: Canada
- Province: Yukon

Highway system
- Territorial highways in Yukon; Miscellaneous
- British Columbia provincial highways
← Hwy 6	→ Hwy 8

The Atlin Road is a road in British Columbia and Yukon, Canada. It is designated as Highway 7 in Yukon, and Unsigned Highway 910:3613 in British Columbia.

It was built by the Canadian Army in 1949, connecting the village of Atlin, British Columbia, with the Tagish Road just one mile west of the Alaska Highway at historic mile 866 (Jakes Corner).

By the mid-1980s, the Yukon section had been improved, being wide and straight, and the B.C. section was narrow, winding, with some less-than-optimum grades. Most of the section in B.C. runs along the eastern shore of Atlin Lake.

By 2000, the B.C. section had been improved and partially paved, but there were complaints about the Yukon section.

By 2007, reconstruction had started on the Yukon section once again. The road has once again been widened and surfaced with a bitumen surface treatment. The completion of the most recent reconstruction was finished by 2016. By spring 2014, only 5 km of road, including two small bridges, remained to be reconstructed.

From Atlin, there are area roads both to the east and the south.

As of October 2017, both the Yukon and the British Columbia portions of the Atlin Road are in very good condition, with very few potholes.

== Major intersections ==
Province/Territory	Regional District	Location	km	mi	Destinations	Notes
British Columbia	Stikine Region (Unorganized)	Atlin	0.00	0.00	Discovery Avenue	Highway 910:3613 and Atlin Road southern terminus
			50.99 0.00	31.68 0.00	British Columbia–Yukon border	Highway 910:3613 northern terminus; Hwy 7 southern terminus
Yukon	Unorganized		91.80	57.04	Hwy 8 (Tagish Road) – Tagish, Carcross, Alaska Highway	Hwy 7 and Atlin Road northern terminus
1.000 mi = 1.609 km; 1.000 km = 0.621 mi: Route transition
