= Axe Murderer =

Axe Murderer may refer to:

- Axe Murder Boyz, hip hop group
- Ax Murderer, a character in the Police Academy film
- The Axe Murderer, a nickname for MMA fighter Wanderlei Silva
- The Axe Murderer (Kids in the Hall character)
- "Axe Murderer", a television episode of The Practice, also a cross-over episode with Ally McBeal
- "Axe Murderer Song", by Camper van Beethoven from the album Camper Vantiquities

== See also ==
- List of axe murders
- So I Married an Axe Murderer, 1993 American film
- Harpoonist & The Axe Murderer, Canadian blues duo
