= AAMF =

AAMF or AAmF may refer to:

- Asociación Amateurs de Football, football association (1919–1926), Argentina
- Atlin Arts & Music Festival, Canada
