= Susan James (musician) =

American singer-songwriter

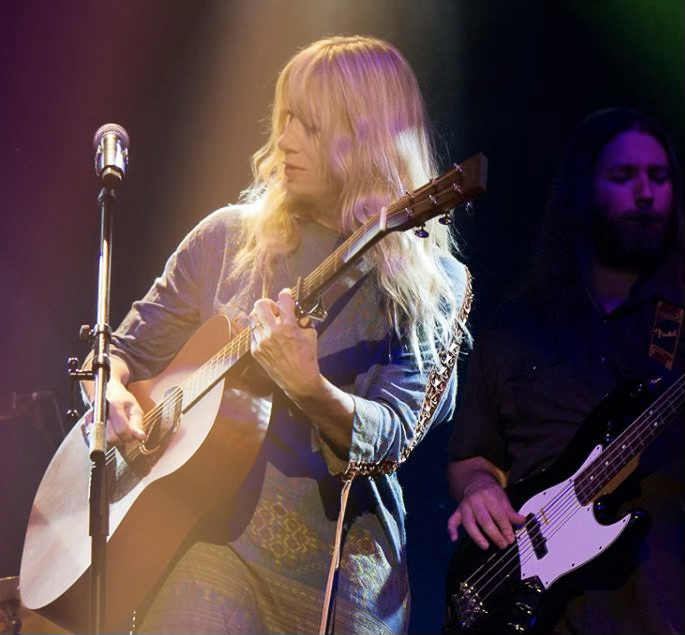
- James in 2011

Background information
- Born: Susan Elizabeth James
- Origin: Pasadena, California, US
- Genres: Folk, Folk-pop, Alternative country Singer-songwriter
- Instruments: Vocals; Guitar; Stringed Instruments; Keyboard
- Years active: 1990–present
- Website: susanjamesmusic.com

Susan James is an American singer, songwriter, and musician known for rock, folk, psychedelic folk and experimental music.

== Early life and education ==
James was raised in Pasadena, California. Her father, Jack James, worked for over 35 years at the Jet Propulsion Laboratory and was Project Manager for NASA's Mariner program.

James studied music at the University of California, Los Angeles. She graduated with a bachelor's degree in ethnomusicology. While still a student, she performed and recorded with a minimalist group created by composer Daniel Lentz.

== Musical career ==
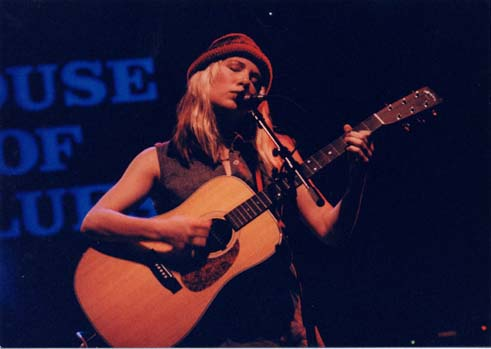
James live at House of Blues, Los Angeles in 2000

James released her first solo album, Life Between Two Worlds in 1990. The album marked her start as an independent musician releasing her own material without the influence of a major record label.

She supported her debut album by playing gigs in many of Los Angeles’ well-known venues, such as Largo. She also received regular airplay from popular KROQ disc jockey Rodney Bingenheimer, who said that James "is among the best of the new breed of women musicians who are going to set the industry on its ear". Bingenheimer and several music critics described her music during this time period in a similar vein as Ani DiFranco.

James' local success led to numerous tours across the United States. She toured with Richard Buckner, and opened for major artists including Bob Weir of the Grateful Dead, Rufus Wainwright, and Daniel Lanois. Weir stated that James was "gifted and writes about interesting stuff." Weir subsequently invited James on several U.S. tours with his bands RatDog and Weir/Wasserman. She was also invited as the opening act in support of Fleetwood Mac’s Lindsay Buckingham during a national tour promoting his first solo record, Out of the Cradle.

In 1996, James recorded her sophomore album, Shocking Pink Banana Seat, in Los Angeles, and released it on her independent label, Major Label Records. Engineered and co-produced by Travis Dickerson, Shocking Pink Banana Seat included D.J. Bonebrake of the Los Angeles punk band X on drums.

Her next album, Fantastic Voyage (1998), was a double album with one CD consisting of guitar and vocal songs and the other featuring instrumental compositions that reflect James’ knowledge of ethnomusicology. It was engineered by John Would at Stanley Recording Studios in Los Angeles. Bassist Tommy Stinson from the Replacements contributed to the recordings.

James took a long hiatus from recording, and did not return until 2010, when she released the Americana-tinged album Highways, Ghosts, Hearts & Home. The album featured performances by Paul Lacques, Paul Marshall, and Shawn Nourse from the band I See Hawks in L.A.; Gabe Witcher from the band Punch Brothers; and Danny McGough from Social Distortion and Shivaree. James supported the album by touring in the U.S. and Europe.

James returned to the studio in 2013 to record Driving Toward the Sun, which garnered largely positive reviews from the press. Several videos were produced for the release, including a post-apocalyptic themed video for the title song which features actor Peter Stormare.

In 2015 James released Sea Glass. She would call it her most defining album. The album is a departure from the more traditional folk music she had previously released. Critic Malcolm Carter described it as an amalgamation of sounds and genres, with references to Baroque pop and 1960s/1970s psychedelic rock. Music critic John Payne said that Sea Glass is a contribution to the distinct California aesthetic, noting that "it’s not a stretch to say it’s as much California classic music as the disparate strains of Terry Riley, Harry Partch, the Beach Boys, and Captain Beefheart." Sea Glass was co-produced and arranged by Sean O'Hagan of the group the High Llamas, whom she met through Mary Hensen of the band Stereolab. Due to O'Hagen being in London and James being in Los Angeles, the two collaborated on the album virtually via Skype. In 2018, independent label Sunstone Records UK re-released Sea Glass on vinyl.

In 2024, James released a new single "Time Is Now". It was announced that this was the title song from an upcoming album of the same name to be released in June 2024.

== Personal life ==
James is married to British engineer and producer Fulton Dingley.

== Discography ==
Album title	Year
Life Between Two Worlds	1990
Shocking Pink Banana Seat	1995
Fantastic Voyage (double album)	1998 (U.S.); 1999 (Europe)
Highways, Ghosts, Hearts & Home	2010
Driving Toward the Sun	2013
Sea Glass	2015; 2018 (vinyl)
Time Is Now	2024 (single, vinyl)
Time Is Now	2024 (album)
