= Zena Sharman =

Canadian health researcher and writer

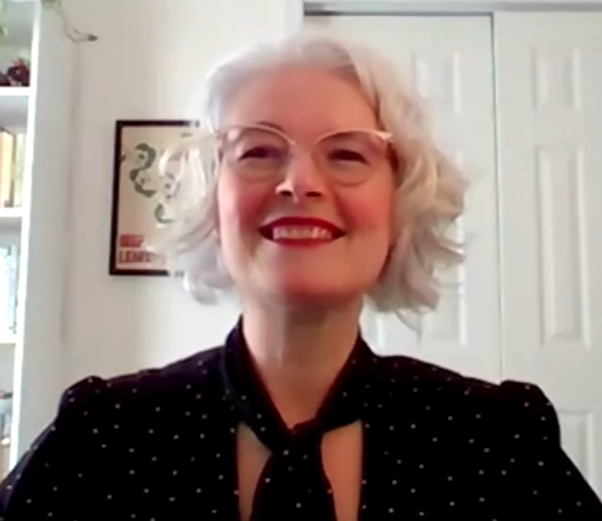
- In a San Francisco Public Library video in 2022
- Occupations: Health researcher, writer

Zena Sharman is a Canadian health researcher and writer, who won the Lambda Literary Award for LGBT Anthology at the 29th Lambda Literary Awards in 2017 for The Remedy: Queer and Trans Voices on Health and Health Care.

The book, an anthology of LGBTQ people's stories about their experiences in the health care system, was published by Arsenal Pulp Press in 2016.

She was previously nominated in the same category at the 24th Lambda Literary Awards in 2012 for Persistence: All Ways Butch and Femme, an anthology which she coedited with Ivan Coyote.

Sharman is currently co-chair of the Catherine White Holman Wellness Centre, a clinic in Vancouver that serves transgender and gender-diverse clients.
