= Mary-Austin Klein =

American landscape painter (born 1964)

Mary-Austin Klein (born 1964 in San Bernardino, California) is an American landscape painter best known for her small-scaled and highly detailed paintings[1] of the southwestern United States.

Klein's work continues the Impressionist tradition of early California fine artists like William Wendt and George Gardner who explored the west at the behest of the Southern Pacific Railroad Company, exchanging paintings for rides. Like these early California artists, Klein’s oil paintings celebrate the bright, colorful light of the southwest. In his blog, Made in Frogtown, the artist and former newsman William Lagattuta notes her “ability to... reduce enormous, powerful landscapes into small, extraordinarily detailed paintings”.[2] The paintings often include evidence of man’s impact on these landscapes, documenting the changing environment and the fragility of the ecosystem.

Her work has been exhibited internationally, as part of the traveling show “California Dreaming: An International Portrait of Southern California” and has been shown at the Riverside Art Museum, the Oceanside Museum of Art, the Bakersfield Museum of Art and the Santa Paula Art Museum. Collectors include artists Wayne Thiebaud and Alma Allen, Nicole Panter, Adam Blackman, Dan Greaney, Jenji Kohan and Christopher Noxon.

Los Angeles band I See Hawks In L.A. featured a song named for Klein’s signature painting style entitled “Mary-Austin Sky” on their 2012 CD "A New Kind of Lonely".

== Footnotes ==
[1] “Review of Into the Blue”, by Liz Goldner, ArtScene, June 2016

[2] “I See Mary-Austin Skies in LA” by William Lagattuta, Made in Frogtown Blog, August 2012
