= Atlin Mountain =

Mountain in British Columbia, Canada

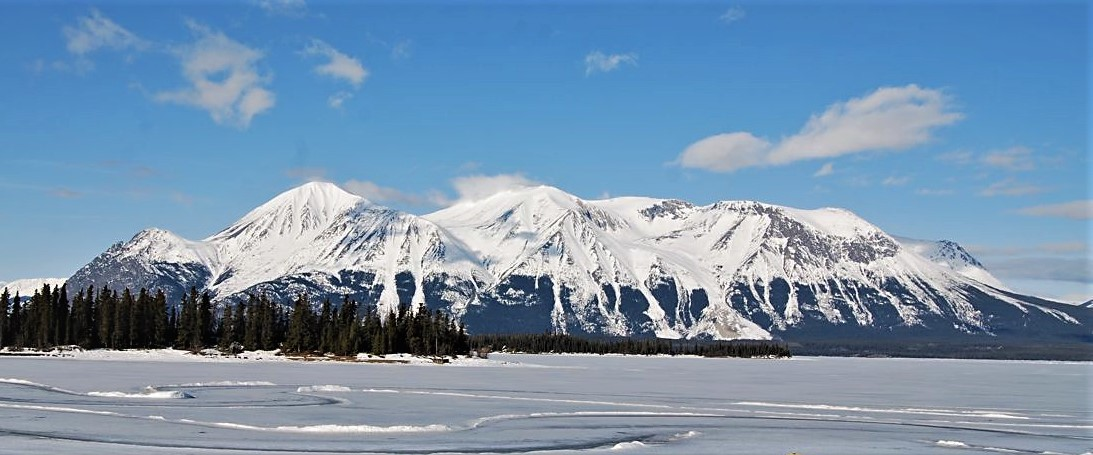
- East aspect

Highest point
- Elevation: 2,046 m (6,713 ft)
- Prominence: 961 m (3,153 ft)
- Listing: Mountains of British Columbia
- Coordinates: 59°31′57″N 133°52′33″W

Geography
- Location within British Columbia
- Interactive map of Atlin Mountain
- Location: British Columbia, Canada
- District: Cassiar Land District
- Parent range: Coast Mountains
- Topo map: NTS 104N12 Atlin

Atlin Mountain, at 2,046 metres (6,713 ft), is a medium-sized mountain located next to Atlin Lake in the northern end of the Coast Mountain range in British Columbia, Canada. It is home to the Atlin Mountain Challenge and Snow Drags snowmobile event and the Atlin Mountain Hill Climb.

== Gallery ==
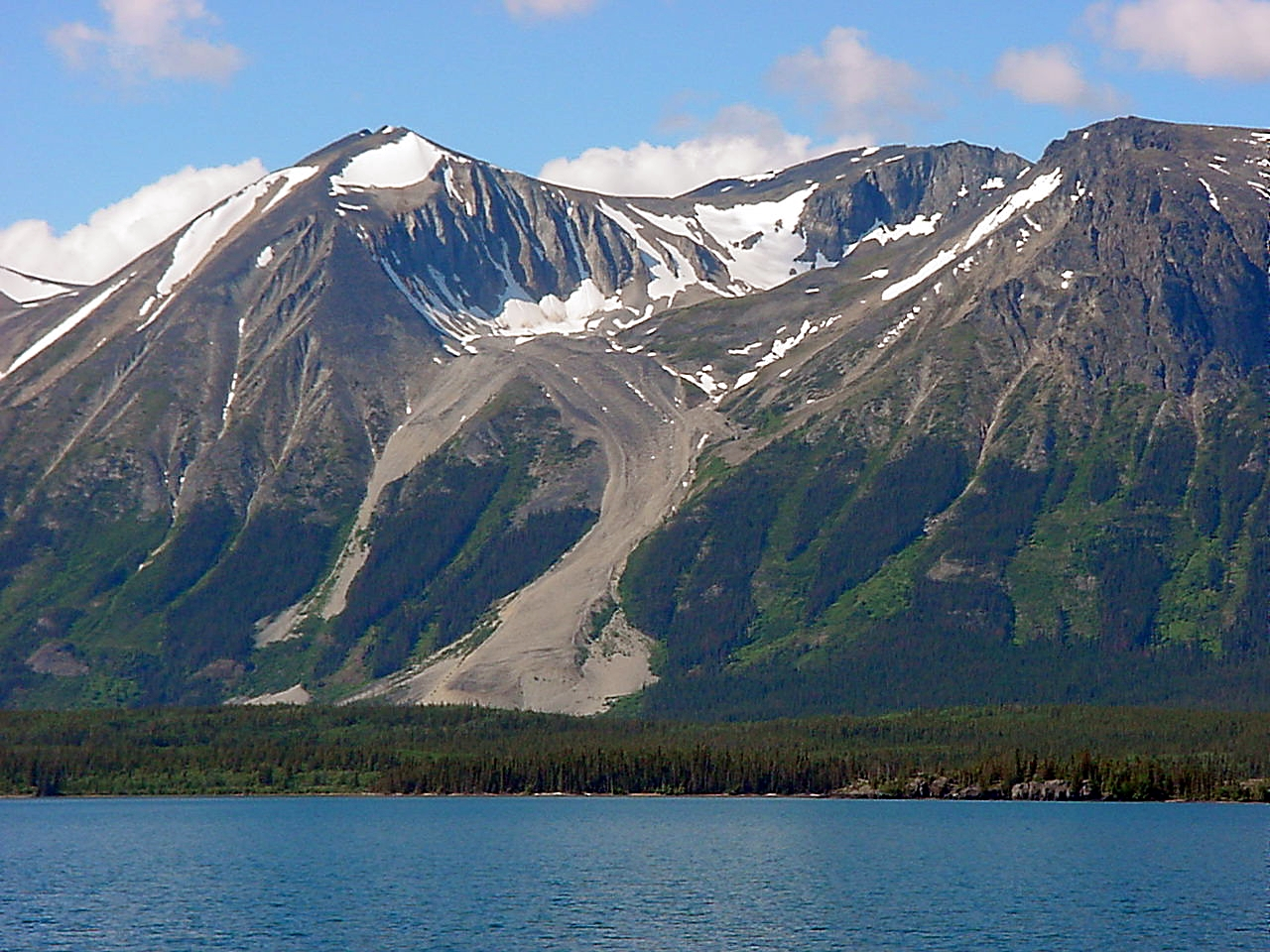
East aspect of Atlin Mountain, featuring rock glacier
