= Tagish, Yukon =

Tagish
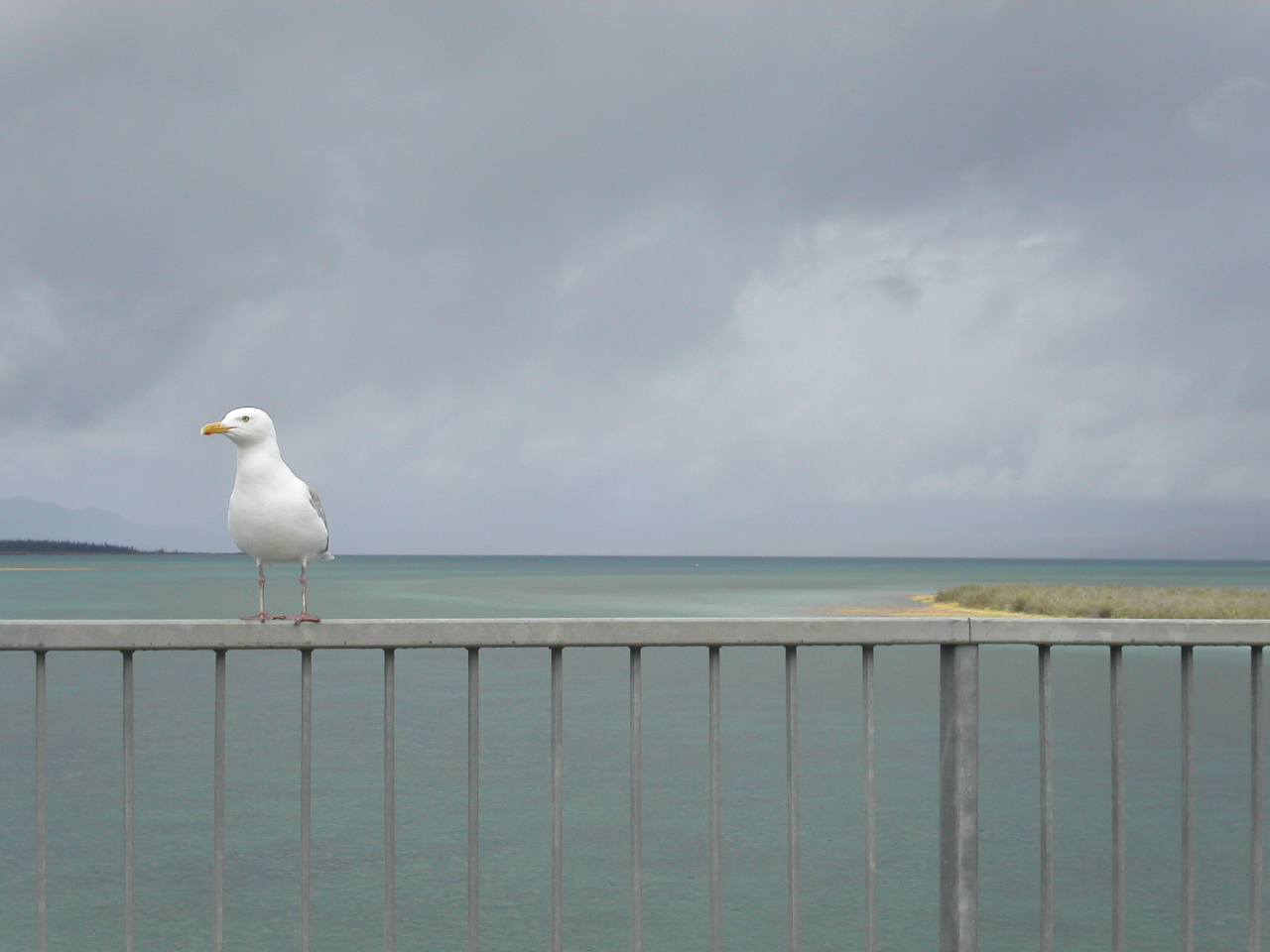
- Seagull on Tagish Bridge, 2003

- Location within Yukon
- Coordinates: 60°18′N 134°16′W
- Country: Canada
- Territory: Yukon

Population (2021)
  - Total: 311
- Time zone: UTC−07:00 (MST)
- Area code: 867

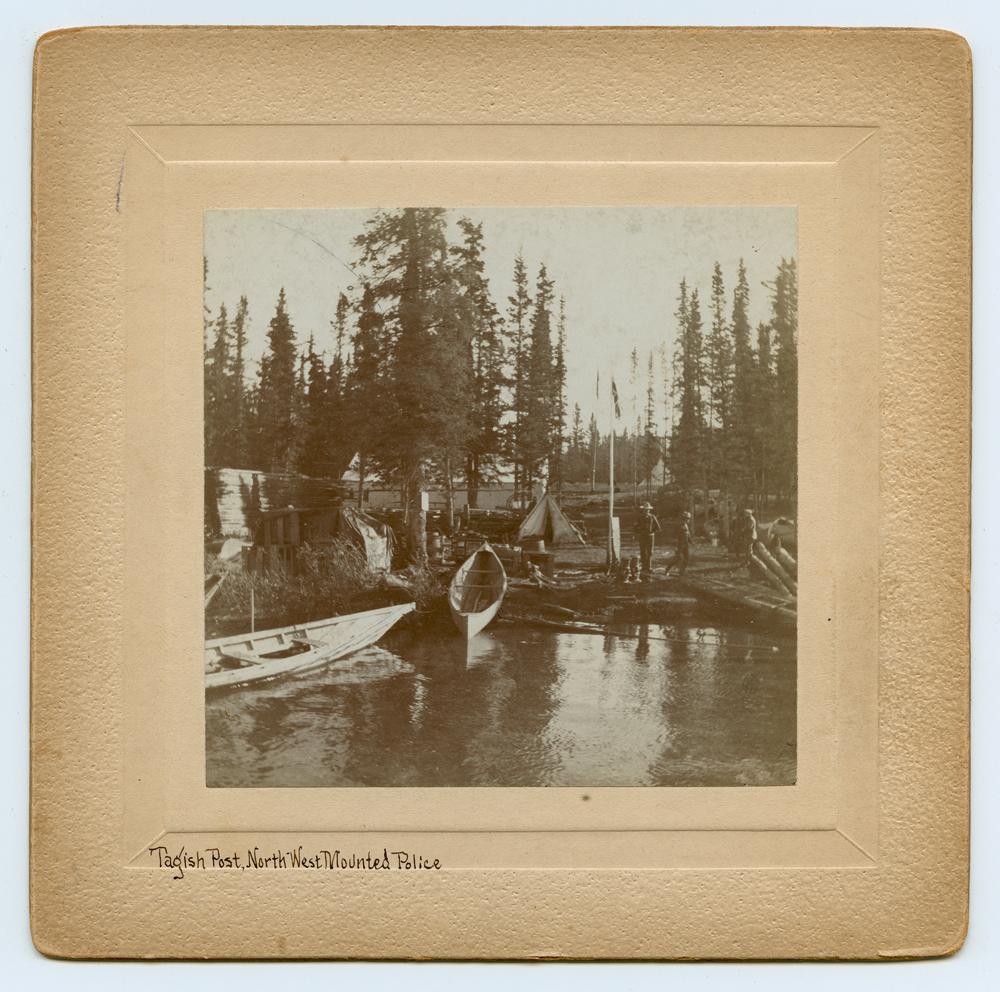
North-West Mounted Police post c. 1896–99

Tagish is an unincorporated community in Yukon, Canada. It is 30 kilometres (19 mi) east of Carcross, Yukon, on the Tagish Road at the northern end of Tagish Lake. The greater Tagish area also includes the Tagish Estates, Tagish Beach and Taku subdivisions, the latter two developed for cottages but now serving for many year-round homes. (California Beach is a part of Tagish Beach subdivision.) Tagish Beach and Taku have their own community hall. The Tagish Road was built in 1942 as part of an oil pipeline project, and the community sprouted around a bridge built over the narrow water between Tagish Lake and Marsh Lake.

A previous community known as Tagish was located about 3 km (2 mi) south of the current community, along Tagish Lake. The North-West Mounted Police maintained a post in that community during the Klondike Gold Rush.

The area code for Yukon is 867. In it, Tagish is served by prefix 399.

== Demographics ==
Federal census population history of Tagish
Year	Pop.	±%
1981	89	—
1986	103	+15.7%
1991	58	−43.7%
1996	69	+19.0%
2001	206	+198.6%
2006	222	+7.8%
2011	391	+76.1%
2016	249	−36.3%
2021	311	+24.9%
Source: Statistics Canada

In the 2021 Census of Population conducted by Statistics Canada, Tagish had a population of 311 living in 164 of its 413 total private dwellings, a change of 24.9% from its 2016 population of 249. With a land area of 45.26 km^{2} (17.47 sq mi), it had a population density of 6.9/km^{2} (17.8/sq mi) in 2021.
