= Rich Hope =

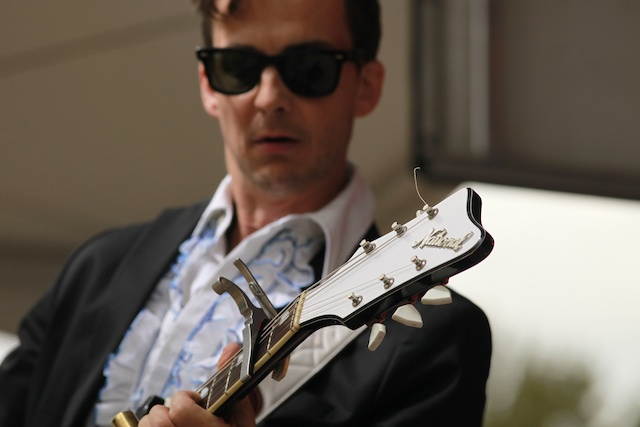

Background information
- Origin: Vancouver, British Columbia
- Genres: Blues; Country
- Labels: Sandbag Records

Rich Hope (born in Edmonton, Alberta) is a Canadian guitarist, singer-songwriter, and performer whose style is influenced by blues and rock. His album Rich Hope and His Evil Doers, was released by Maximum Jazz Records in 2005. Rich is represented by Turner Music and Events in Vancouver, British Columbia.

== Career ==
Hope's first solo release was Good to Go in 1998. Afterwards, he joined the band John Ford and became one of their principal songwriters. John Ford released their self-titled debut in 1999, followed by a five-year tour across Canada. A second album with John Ford, Bullets for Dreamers, was released in 2003.

Hope's second release moved towards an electric country blues tone, which included songs such as Shake This Joint Around and My Love is a Bullet. He is often backed up by the band Evil Doers, but also does solo shows around Vancouver with the Blue Rich Rangers.
