= Tagish Road =

Highway in Yukon, Canada

Tagish Road
- Yukon Highway 8
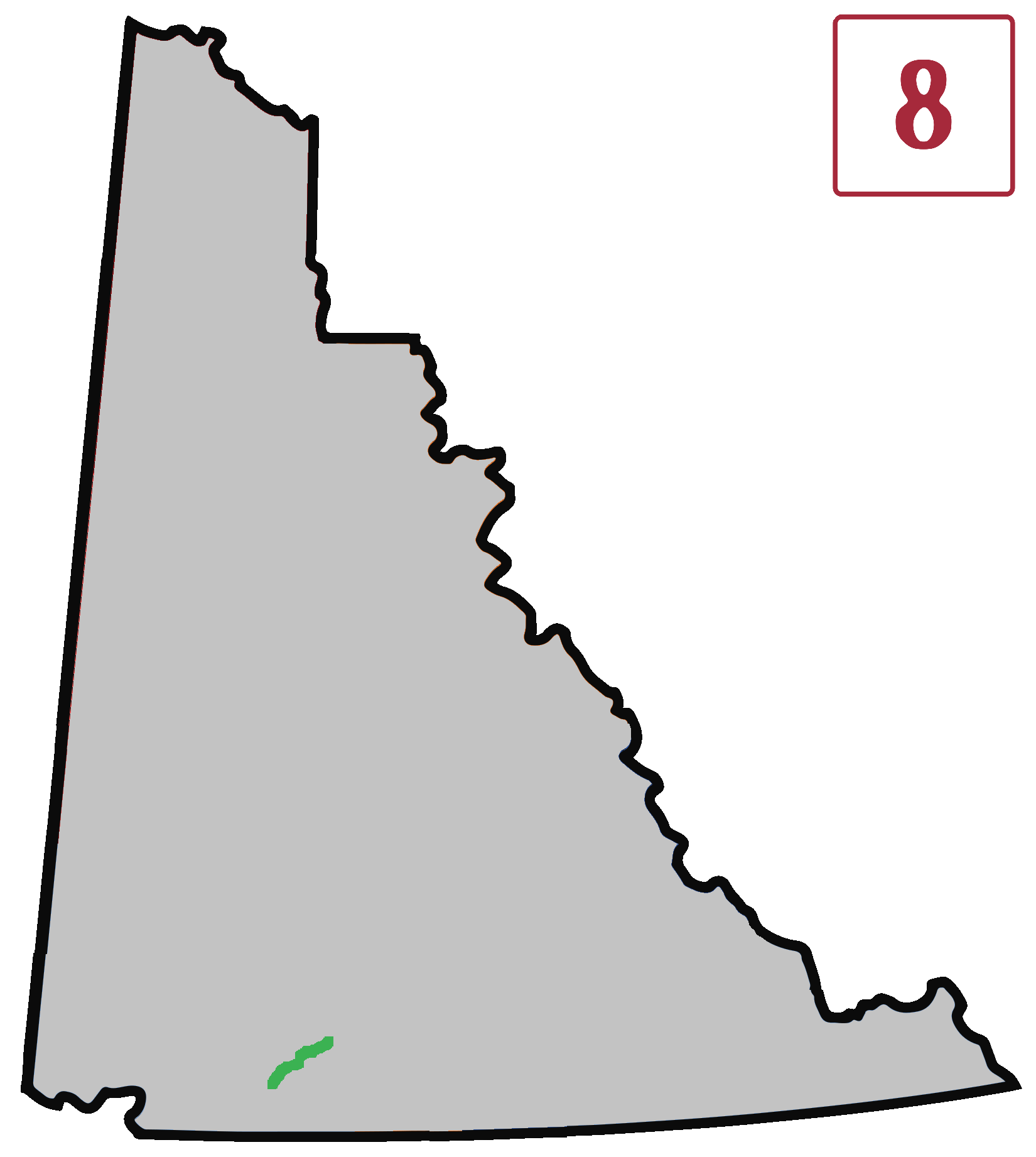

Route information
- Maintained by Department of Highways and Public Works
- Length: 54 km (34 mi)

Major junctions
- West end: Hwy 2 in Carcross
- Hwy 7 near Jakes Corner
- East end: Hwy 1 in Jakes Corner

Location
- Country: Canada
- Province: Yukon

Highway system
- Territorial highways in Yukon; Miscellaneous
← Hwy 7	→ Hwy 9

The Tagish Road (also known as Yukon Highway 8) is a 33-mile (53-kilometre) road, now hard surfaced, that links Jakes Corner on the Alaska Highway with Carcross, Yukon on the Klondike Highway. One mile (1.6 km) from Jakes Corner is the terminus of the Atlin Road. The small community of Tagish is located 12 miles (19 km) from Jakes Corner.

Until the Alaska Highway was completed in 1943 along Marsh Lake, the Tagish Road was a vital segment of the original Alaska Highway route opened in the fall of 1942. For many years, a long wooden bridge was a vital link over the Tagish River, but a concrete bridge replaced it. Rerouting and realignment of the first 12 miles (19 km) was completed in June, 2005.

== See also ==
- List of Yukon territorial highways
