= Atlin Provincial Park =

Provincial park in the Stikine Region of British Columbia, Canada

- IUCN category II (national park)
- Location within British Columbia
- Interactive map of Atlin Provincial Park
- Location: Stikine Region, British Columbia
- Nearest city: Atlin and Whitehorse
- Coordinates: 59°08′59″N 134°03′00″W
- Area: 3,011.40 square kilometres (1,162.71 sq mi)
- Established: 1973
- Governing body: BC Parks
- Website: BC Parks Atlin

Atlin Provincial Park, officially Atlin/Áa Tlein Téix'i Provincial Park, is a provincial park in British Columbia, Canada. Situated in the remote northwestern corner of the province, the park protects large tracts of boreal forest, alpine tundra and glaciated terrain. The southern third of Atlin Lake, the largest natural body of freshwater in the province, is within the park boundary. The park is very undeveloped; no roads traverse it and no facilities, supplies, developed campsites or maintained hiking trails are available inside the park. The area has become a focal point in controversies involving proposed hydroelectric projects affecting Atlin Lake and environmental groups who view these proposals as potentially damaging to the lake's environment and its surroundings.

== History ==
Atlin is an anglicization of Áa Tlein, the Tlingit word for "big body of water". The area has been used by the Taku River Tlingit for many years as attested to by artifacts discovered at nearly 40 excavated archaeological sites in the area.

The gold rush came to Atlin Lake country in 1898 and was one of the richest offshoots of the Klondike Gold Rush. By the end of the mining season of 1899 about 5000 people flocked to the region, and the community of Atlin was a busy and important town. Although creeks in the present-day park must have been prospected, none bore any gold. Although production was greatest in the early years, the Atlin field still produces today. Total placer gold production has exceeded $23 million.

In the early 1970s, BC Hydro proposed development of a hydroelectric project which included the construction of a tunnel to divert water from Atlin Lake to the Taku River. Fearing a potential disruption to the local environment, the provincial government opted to protect Atlin Lake and its surroundings by establishing a provincial park in the area in 1973.

A second factor which motivated the creation of this park was a desire on the part of the newly elected provincial NDP government to reverse the policy of prior administrations towards the provincial park system. Noting how prior administrations over the preceding two decades had reduced the number of hectares protected by provincial parks such as Hamber, the NDP government pledged to include over 600,000 hectares (1,500,000 acres) of new land within this system. Atlin was one of several new parks created at the time. Environmental groups applauded the move, but noted that these new parks largely protected alpine wilderness or, as in the case of Atlin, areas in remote parts of the province where access was difficult. For these reasons the newly protected lands were of little value to the logging industry. The provincial government was criticized for making "easy decisions" which the logging industry would not oppose.

Environmental concern involving the park recently resurfaced in the reaction to a proposal by Yukon Energy to construct a weir at Atlin Lake's outlet to stabilize its water level. Yukon Energy stated that the weir is needed to retain water during the winter months which in turn will permit the production of more hydroelectricity downstream during these months when the demand for electricity is highest. Environmentalists responded that the weir could inflict ecological damage and disrupt the migration route of lake trout and other fish between Atlin and nearby lakes. Many local residents were opposed out of concern that raised lake levels could cause flooding and increase shoreline erosion. For the project to proceed, Yukon Energy required the approval of the British Columbia provincial government because part of Atlin Lake is within the park boundary. In 2011 the provincial government and the Taku River Tlingit completed a land-use plan for the Atlin Lake area which prohibits weir construction and many other types of development.

Atlin's extensive icefields have attracted recent interest from glaciologists and other scientists. Their studies have helped to raise awareness of the park's conservation value.

== Conservation ==
Approximately one third of the park's area is occupied by glaciers. The Llewellyn Glacier, considered the source of the Yukon River, is the park's largest. It covers 71,140 hectares and the next largest, Willison Glacier, covers 10,165 hectares. Among the park's many lakes, the largest is Atlin Lake. At 775 square kilometers, it is the largest natural freshwater body in the province. Three of British Columbia's biogeoclimatic zones are represented within the park:

- alpine tundra
- boreal white and black spruce
- spruce-willow-birch.

The parks aims to protect habitat for grizzly and black bear, mountain goat, caribou, moose, Stone sheep, and various timber wolf populations. There are many small mammals such as hoary marmots, Arctic ground squirrels, pikas, beavers and river otters. Birds also inhabit the park area, such as the Arctic tern, blue-grouse, ruffed-grouse and the rock, willow and white-tailed ptarmigan.

Rising temperatures driven by climate change are expected to affect the park's environment throughout this century. As temperatures rise, more precipitation is likely to arrive as rain rather than snow. Mean annual snowfall may be reduced by as much as 40% by 2100. Lake levels and the size of the park's mountain glaciers may decline as a result. These climatic changes are also anticipated to produce "reduced alpine vegetation and a shift to warmer biogeoclimatic zones in the inland portions of the Atlin-Taku region".

== Location and Size ==
Located 20 kilometres south of Atlin, British Columbia, surrounding Atlin Lake. Visitors cannot access the park by vehicle. The primary means of access are via boat or aircraft, but it is also possible to hike in or ride in (once a permit for bringing a horse into the park has been obtained from provincial authorities). The park is 301,140 hectares (1,163 square miles) in size.

== See also ==
- List of British Columbia Provincial Parks
