= The Violet Lights =

American indie rock duo

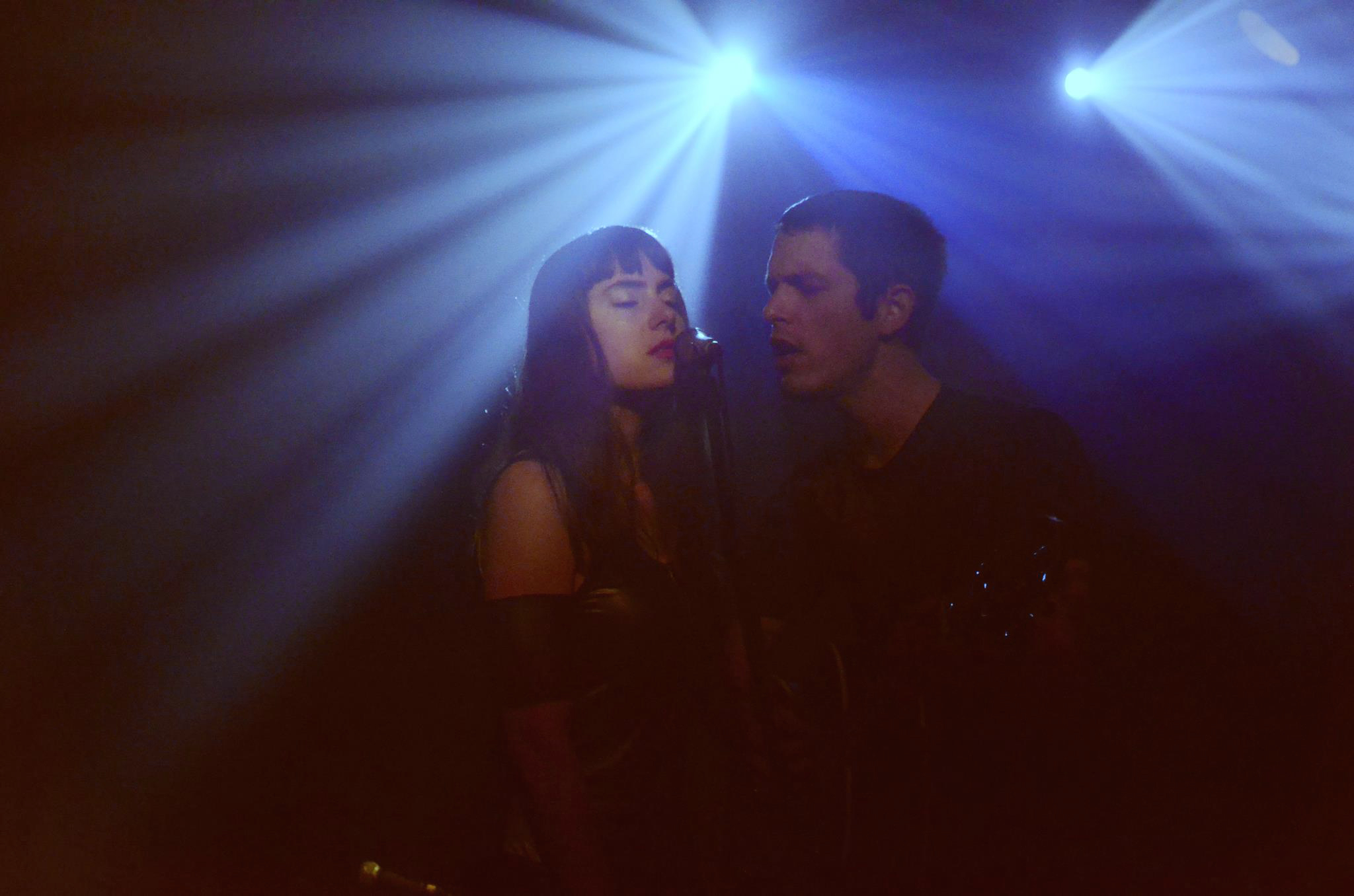
- The Violet Lights in Chicago in 2012

Background information
- Origin: Los Angeles, California
- Genres: Indie rock, garage rock
- Years active: 2009-present
- Members: Joel Nass; Amber Garvey
- Website: thevioletlights.com

The Violet Lights are an American indie rock duo formed in Los Angeles in 2009. The group consists of Joel Nass and Amber Garvey. The sound of the band has been described as influenced by The Strokes, Arctic Monkeys, The Killers, as well as garage rock and Britpop.

== History ==
Both originally from Green Bay, Wisconsin, Nass and Garvey moved together to Los Angeles in 2008 before forming The Violet Lights.

The Violet Lights document their experiences as a band online, consisting of photography and writing by Garvey.

=== Sex and Sound ===
The band's first record, Sex & Sound EP was released in 2011. Released independently, and produced by Nass, Sex & Sound was recorded at Sunset Sound in Hollywood. The record was described as having high production values and a radio-friendly sound for an independent release.

Sex & Sound gained significant airplay on North American college radio in late 2011, debuting at No. 12 on the CMJ Radio 200 Adds Chart, appearing on the CMJ Radio 200 Chart, and appearing on the top 30 airplay charts of many college stations.

The Violet Lights toured North America in support of Sex & Sound for much of 2012, playing over 100 dates, including performances at the South by Southwest music festival in Austin, Texas in March 2012.

The band has played dates with Dead Sara, Cory Chisel, Greg Ginn, and The Bright Light Social Hour.

=== Old Goodies ===
In 2024, the band released Old Goodies, a 5-song EP of previously-unreleased songs they played while on tour in 2012.

== Discography ==
=== EPs ===
- Sex & Sound (2011)
1. "Your Love/Not Enough"
2. "Ready or Not"
3. "Sex & Sound"
4. "Substitute"
5. "It'd be Fine"

=== EPs ===
- Old Goodies (2024)
1. "You're Not Alone"
2. "Your Hair Looks Nice"
3. "One I'd Like"
4. "Homeless"
5. "Finding Your Way"

=== Singles ===
- "New Year's Song" (2013)
