= Sarah MacDougall =

Swedish Canadian singer/songwriter

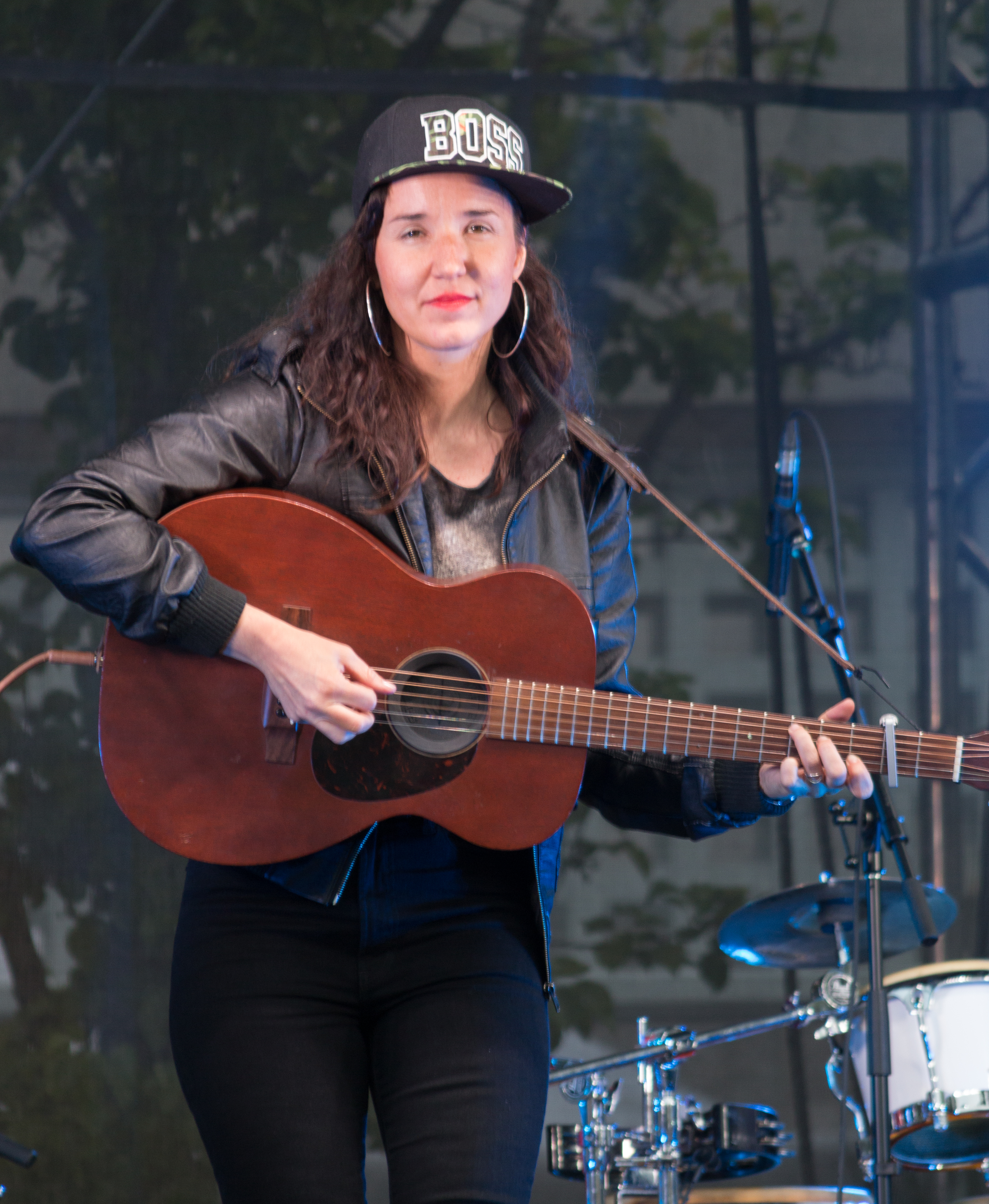
- MacDougall performing in 2015 at Burlington's Sound of Music Festival

Background information
- Born: Malmö, Sweden
- Origin: Whitehorse, Yukon, Canada
- Genres: Folk, Acoustic, Americana, Folk Rock
- Occupation(s): Musician, Singer-songwriter
- Instrument(s): Guitar, Vocals
- Labels: Independent, Rabbit Heart Music
- Website: www.sarahmacdougall.com

Sarah MacDougall is a Swedish Canadian singer/songwriter currently living in Toronto, Ontario, Canada.

Born in Malmö, Sweden, MacDougall moved to Canada to study music in Vancouver when she was a teenager. Her first tour took her in Whitehorse, where she decided to live for a time. For her 2018 album, All the Hours I Have Left to Tell You Anything, MacDougall enlisted Montreal-based producer Marcus Paquin, who has engineered albums for The National and Arcade Fire. In 2019, MacDougall toured with Ivan Coyote, playing songs with a band and participating in Coyote's spoken-word performances.

== Discography ==
- All the Hours I Have Left to Tell You Anything, 2018
- Grand Canyon, 2015
- The Greatest Ones Alive, 2011
- Across the Atlantic, 2009
- I Don't Want To Be Alone Anymore, 2008 EP

== Awards ==
2012 Western Canadian Music Award – Roots Solo Recording of the Year – Sarah MacDougall – The Greatest Ones Alive
