= Harpoonist & The Axe Murderer =

Canadian blues duo

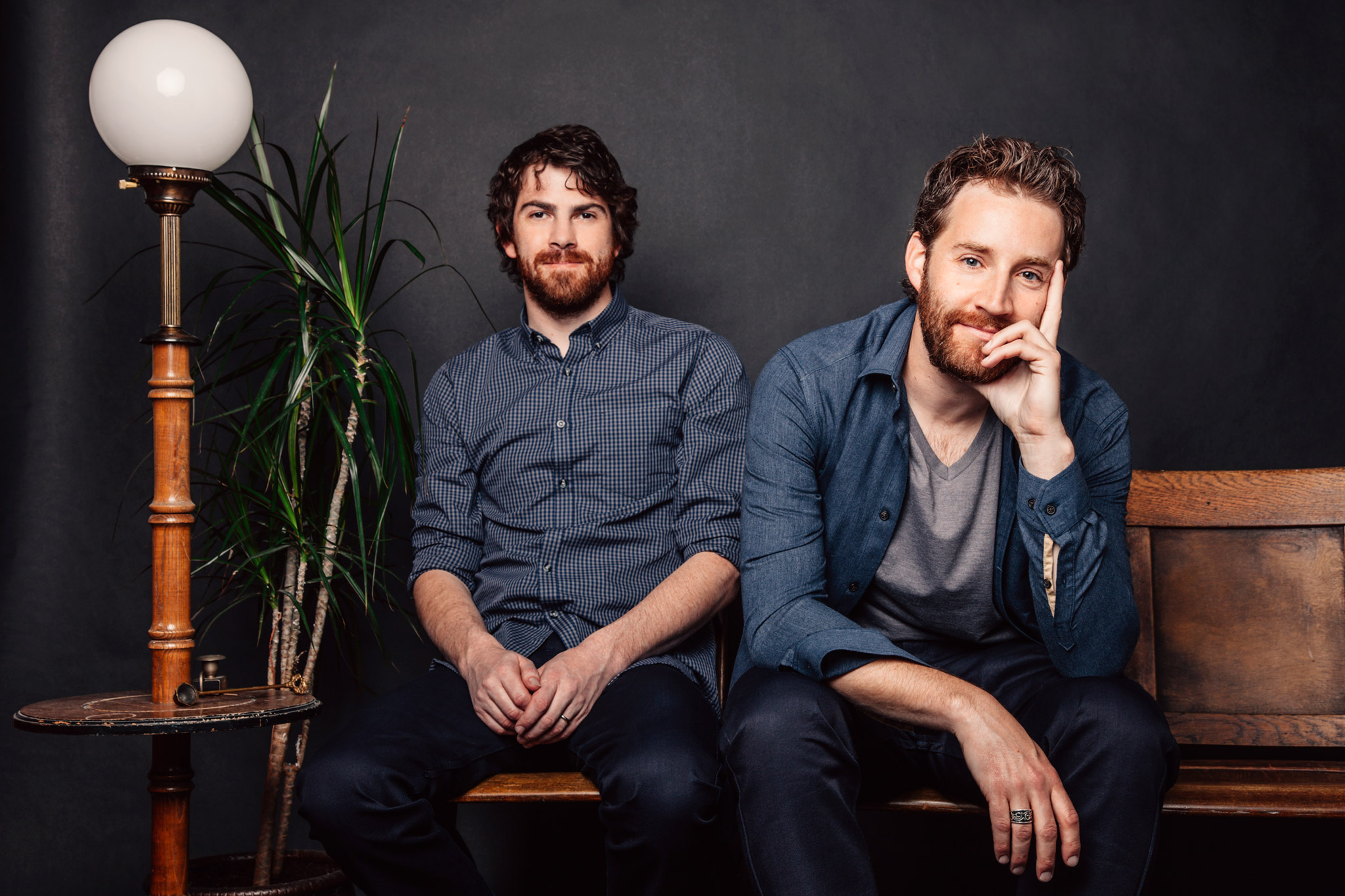
- Harpoonist & The Axe Murderer in Vancouver, 2014.

Background information
- Origin: Vancouver, British Columbia, Canada
- Genres: Blues, rock
- Instruments: Harmonica, electric guitar, foot percussion
- Years active: 2006–present
- Label: Tonic Records
- Members: Shawn Hall; Matthew Rogers
- Website: www.harpoonistaxemurderer.com

Harpoonist & The Axe Murderer are a Vancouver based blues duo, consisting of Shawn Hall and Matthew Rogers.

== History ==
Shawn Hall and Matthew Rogers met at a jingle recording session in 2006. Hall worked for Citytv and Rogers was/is a film composer. They discovered they had a mutual affinity for a multitude of musical genres, but mainly folk and blues. The band began as a folk duo and their sound continued to evolve into a bigger, more electric sound.

They have had their songs featured on television shows such as CSI, NCIS New Orleans, The Good Wife, Blue Bloods, and the television movie Lizzie Borden Took an Ax.

== Live performances ==
Harpoonist & the Axe Murderer are known for their energetic live shows and commanding stage presence and are popular on the festival circuit. They have played SXSW 2013, the 2013 Winnipeg Folk Festival, the 2013 Ottawa Blues Fest, the Atlin Arts & Music Festival, the Calgary Folk Music Festival, the Vancouver Folk Music Festival, the Festival d'été de Québec, the Copenhagen Jazz Festival, the Queenscliff Music Festival, and the Montreal Jazz Fest. They have shared the stage with Dr. Dog, St. Paul & The Broken Bones, Clap Your Hands Say Yeah, Taj Mahal, XIXA, Tinariwen, Booker T Jones, David Wilcox, Mother Mother, The Sheepdogs, and Serena Ryder.

== Awards ==
Harpoonist & The Axe Murderer received a Sirius XM Indie award in 2013 for Blues Artist of the Year. Their third album, Checkered Past (released on October 27, 2011) was nominated at the Maple Blues Awards for 'Album of the Year' in 2013. Shawn Hall was also nominated for a Maple Blues Award for Harmonica Player of the Year. In 2014, they were nominated for a Juno for their album A Real Fine Mess. In 2017, The Harpoonist & The Axe Murderer won BreakOut Artist of the Year at the West Coast Music Awards and were nominated for Entertainer of the Year, Recording/Producer of the Year & Harmonica Player of the Year for the 2018 Maple Blues Awards.

== Discography ==
=== Albums ===
- The Blues Can Kill (Independent) 2007
- The Harpoonist & the Axe Murderer (Independent) June 25, 2008
- Checkered Past (Independent) Jan 24, 2012
- A Real Fine Mess (Tonic Records) June 17, 2014
- Apocalipstick (Tonic Records) March 24, 2017
- Post Apocalipstick (Tonic Records) April 30, 2021
