= Susan James (midwife) =

Susan Gail James (born 1953) is a Canadian nurse and midwife, a "Canadian leader in [the] field of midwifery". From 1999 to 2019 she was director of the midwifery school at Laurentian University.

== Life ==
Susan James was born on June 21, 1953, in Toronto, the daughter of Barbara Joan (Bagsley) James and Alan Leslie James. She trained as a nurse at the Women's College Hospital School of Nursing, graduating in 1973. From 1973 to 1982 she was a staff nurse in labor and delivery at the Women's College Hospital. In 1979 James gained a bachelor's in nursing from the University of Toronto.

From 1983 to 1987 James practiced as an obstretric nurse. Training with midwives Sandy Pullin and Noreen Walker, she gained a midwifery certificate from the University of Alberta in 1989, joining Pullin's practice, With Women Midwifery Care. She gained an MA in 1990, and from 1990 to 1992 was on the faculty of the University of Toronto's nursing school. In 1992 she became a research associate at the John Dossetor Health Ethics Centre, lecturing there from 1994 to 1999. She secured her PhD from the University of Alberta in 1997, with a thesis entitiled With woman: the nature of the midwifery relation.

In 1999 James became director of Laurentian University's Midwifery Education Programme, and continued as director until 2019. She voiced public complaint at the closing of the midwifery school in 2021.

== Works ==
- James, Susan (1995). "Gossip, Stories and Friendship: Confidentiality in Midwifery Practice". Nursing Ethics. 2 (4): 295–302. doi:10.1177/096973309500200404. S2CID 20852627.
- (with Philippa Spoel) Spoel, Philippa; James, Susan (2006). "Negotiating public and professional interests: a rhetorical analysis of the debate concerning the regulation of midwifery in Ontario, Canada". Journal of the Medical Humanities. 27 (3): 167–186. doi:10.1007/s10912-006-9016-7. PMID 16927112. S2CID 23813362.
- "There are both positive and negative implications to the use of mobile phones in the birth suite". Evidence-Based Nursing. 23 (4). 2020.
