= I See Hawks In L.A. =

- Origin: Los Angeles, California, USA
- Genres: Alternative country
- Years active: 2000 - present
- Labels: Ethic Records, Western Seeds Records, American Beat Records
- Members: Rob Waller (vocals/, guitar); Paul Lacques (guitars, vocals, dobro); Paul Marshall (bass, vocals); Victoria Jacobs (drums, vocals)
- Past members: David Jackson, Anthony Lacques, Shawn Nourse, Brantley Kearns, Marcus Watkins
- Website: www.iseehawks.com

I See Hawks In L.A. is an alternative country group from Los Angeles, California founded in 1999 by Rob Waller and brothers Paul and Anthony Lacques with the support of established West Coast country rock bassist David Jackson. Their music incorporates the traditional elements of country music, vocal harmonies and traditional instruments including acoustic guitar and fiddle.

Their 2001 debut album, I See Hawks In L.A., (featuring exDave Alvin and Dwight Yoakam fiddle player Brantley Kearns and an album cover designed by ex-Vision Street Wear artist Andy Takakjian) made the Alternative Country Chart and led them to perform regularly in country music clubs in California, joined by ex-Strawberry Alarm Clock and Hank Thompson bassist Paul Marshall and Dwight Yoakam's drummer Shawn Nourse. With this core line-up now established they went on to record four more albums (as of summer 2010) and tour more widely, including a 2006 tour of the US and Europe with Tony Gilkyson and another European tour in 2008. They have since opened shows for Lucinda Williams and Chris Hillman, the former Byrds and Flying Burrito Brothers musician who played on I See Hawks in L.A.'s third album along with a number of respected country music session musicians such as Rick Shea, Tommy Funderburk, Cody Bryant and Danny McGough. The band continues to play regularly and has become one of the best-known country music acts in Southern California. Their albums have had country music chart success and they were named Best Country Artist by LA Weekly in 2002 and 2003. From 2003 to 2006 they enjoyed a residency at Cole's Pacific Electric Buffet in downtown Los Angeles and they regularly appear at The Echo (venue) in Echo Park, CA, and Pappy & Harriet's in Pioneertown, California. They have also appeared at the South by Southwest festival in Austin, Texas, the Gram Parsons tribute Gram fest in Joshua Tree, California, and the Seattle Hempfest.

Regarding the name they say, The band name was a code, a question, a diffident invitation: If you see hawks, then maybe we should talk. The topics of their lyrics include a bio-sketch of Senator Robert Byrd of West Virginia, who stood up to George W. Bush during the Iraq War

From 2003 to 2006 the Hawks enjoyed a weekly residency at Cole's Pacific Electric Buffet in downtown Los Angeles. Guests at these shows included PF Sloan, Lowen & Navarro, Carlos Guitarlos, and Amy Farris.

With a core lineup of Rob Waller, Paul Lacques, Paul Marshall and Shawn Nourse the band recorded Grapevine, California Country and Hallowed Ground. These albums featured numerous guests including Chris Hillman of the Byrds, Rick Shea, Tommy Funderburk, Cody Bryant, Dave Zirbel, Gabe Witcher, Dave Markowitz, Joe Beraldi, Richie Lawrence, Marcus Watkins, Marc Doten, John McDiffie and Danny McGough. Singer songwriter Carla Olson was a featured guest of the group's Shoulda Been Gold "best of" album which included a few new tracks and she continues to collaborate with the band on recording projects and live shows.

In 2012 I See Hawks In LA recorded their first all acoustic album, "New Kind Of Lonely," which made the top ten Freeform American Roots and European Americana charts. It was released in Europe and the UK on Blue Rose.

In 2018 the band released "Live And Never Learn," their 8th album. Drummer Victoria Jacobs appeared all 14 tracks and is the featured duet vocalist along with Rob Waller on the tragicomic ballad "My Parka Saved Me" which received substantial airplay on US, UK and European Americana radio.

The band's July 2019 album, "Hawks With Good Intentions," is an acoustic folk Americana collaboration with the UK's leading folk duo, The Good Intentions. The project began as a songwriting session between Hawks Rob Waller and Paul Lacques with Peter Davies (of The Good Intentions).

== Discography ==
- I See Hawks In L.A.(1999) with David Jackson (bass) and Brantley Kearns (fiddle)
- Grapevine (2004)
- California Country (2006) with Cody Bryant (banjo), Tommy Funderburk, Chris Hillman (mandolin), Danny McGough, Rick Shea (mandolin), and Marcus Watkins ("Twin Patriotic Guitar")
- Hallowed Ground (2008) with Richie Lawrence (accordion/piano), Dave Markowitz (fiddle), Rick Shea (guitar), Gabe Witcher (fiddle), and Dave Zirbel (pedal steel guitar)
- Shoulda Been Gold (2010) (compilation with five new or unreleased tracks), with Carla Olson
- New Kind of Lonely (2012) with Richie Lawrence (accordion), Dave Raven (drums), Cliff Wagner (banjo), and Gabe Witcher (fiddle). Cover art by Mary-Austin Klein.
- Mystery Drug (2013)
- Live And Never Learn (2018)
- "Hawks With Good Intentions"
