= Ivan Coyote =

Canadian spoken word performer and writer

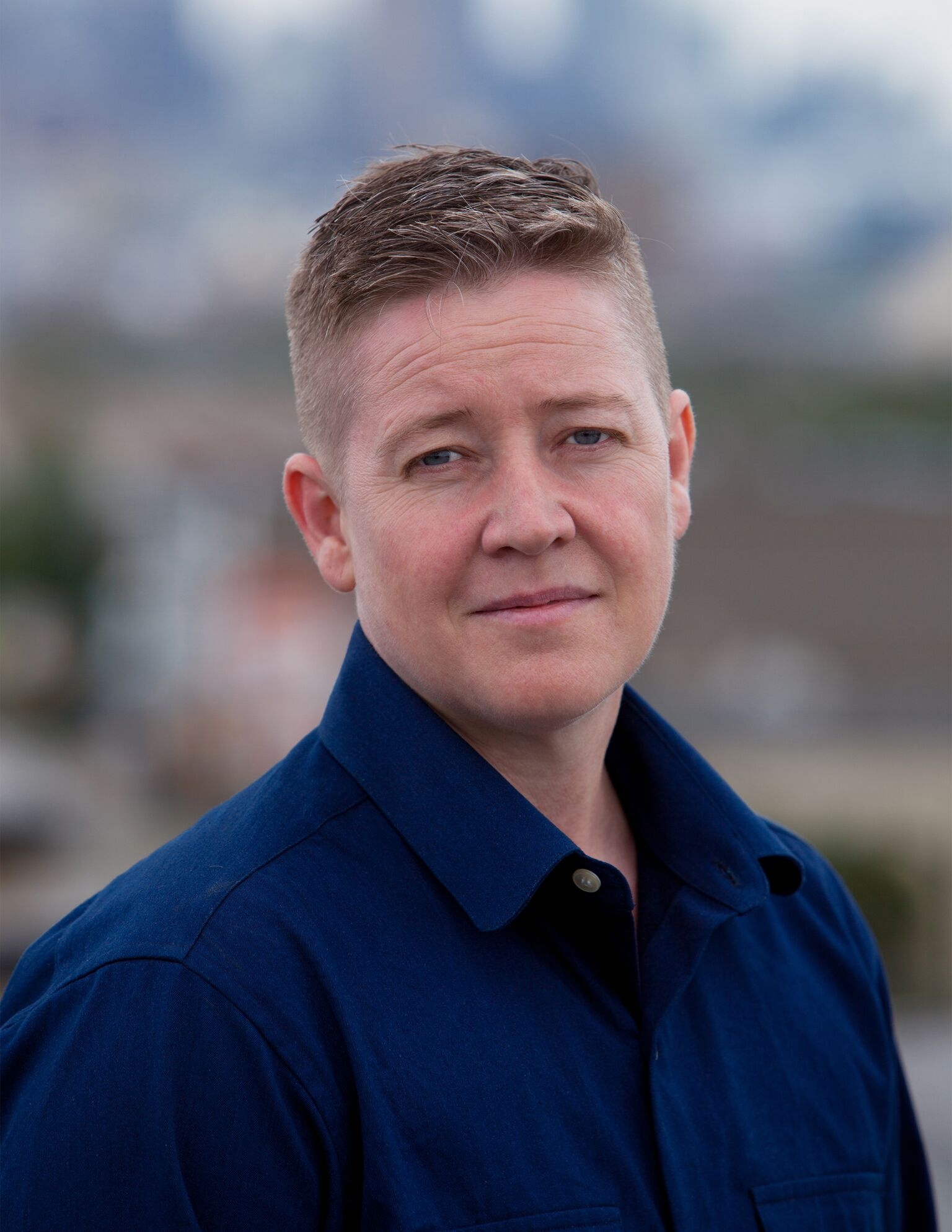
- Coyote in 2017
- Born: Whitehorse, Yukon, Canada
- Occupations: Writer and storyteller
- Website: ivancoyote.com

Ivan Coyote is a Canadian writer, storyteller, and performer. Coyote has won many accolades for their collections of short stories, novels, and films. They also visit schools to tell stories and give writing workshops. The CBC has called Coyote a "gender-bending author who loves telling stories and performing in front of a live audience." Coyote is non-binary and uses singular they pronouns. Many of Coyote's stories are about gender, identity, and social justice. Coyote resides in Whitehorse, Yukon.

== Career ==
Coyote started performing spoken word in 1992, and their work deals with contemporary issues of family, class gender, identity, and social justice. In 1996, Coyote co-founded the queer performance group Taste This with Anna Camilleri, Zoe Eakle, and Lyndell Montgomery. Taste This was a multi-genre performance group that incorporated live music, poetry, and storytelling. The group disbanded in 2000. In 2001, Coyote briefly taught short fiction at Capilano University in North Vancouver. In 2010, Coyote, Camilleri, and Montgomery regrouped as Swell, and premiered at the 2010 Vancouver Pride in Art Festival.

Coyote joined Arsenal Pulp Press in 2000 and have published 11 books with them. Coyote regularly combines storytelling and music and has worked with a number of musicians including Veda Hille, Dan Mangan, and Rae Spoon. Coyote has been a columnist for the LGBTQ+ magazines Xtra! and Xtra! West and regularly contributes to The Georgia Straight and CBC Radio.

Coyote has been writer-in-residence for Carleton University in 2007, Vancouver Public Library in 2009, the University of Winnipeg in 2011, and the University of Western Ontario in 2012. They also served on the jury of the 2012 Dayne Ogilvie Prize, a literary award for emerging LGBT writers in Canada, selecting Amber Dawn as that year's winner.

In 2009, their performance You Are Here was scheduled for a cabaret run at Hysteria: A Festival of Women at Buddies in Bad Times Theatre, but was cancelled in January of that year.

In 2008, they performed spoken word at Montreal's Edgy Women festival and taught a writing workshop.

In 2012, Coyote and Spoon collaborated on Gender Failure, a touring multimedia show in which they performed music and spoken word pieces about their failed attempts at fitting into the gender binary. A book based on the show was published by Arsenal Pulp Press in 2014.

On November 14, 2015, Coyote did a TED talk in Vancouver entitled "We all need a safe place to pee", where they discuss the need to have gender-neutral bathrooms in all public places.

In 2016, they delivered the Florence Bird Lecture at Carleton University. Their lecture was titled "Neither, Nor: How to Circumnavigate the Gender Binary in Seven Thousand Easy Steps".

In 2020, Coyote performed as part of CBC Gem's Queer Pride Inside special.

== Writing ==
Coyote has written thirteen books: one with Press Gang Publishers, one with Penguin Random House, and eleven with Arsenal Pulp Press. Common themes in their work involve identity, gender, community, and class.

Coyote's first book, Boys Like Her (Press Gang Publishers, 1998), was adapted from a live show that was performed by their theater troupe, Taste This.

Close to Spiderman (Arsenal Pulp Press, 2000) and One Man's Trash (Arsenal Pulp Press, 2002) are both collections of stories told by Coyote's grandmother and transcribed by Coyote.

Missed Her (Arsenal Pulp Press, 2010) is another book of compiled short stories. The works were first published in columns with Xtra Vancouver.

One in Every Crowd (Arsenal Pulp Press, 2012) is an anthology of Coyote's work that was put together at the request of high school teachers and librarians who wanted to share Coyote's writing with students. Without more mature parts of their writing, their works could be accepted by school administration and parents. It was specifically composed for queer youth.

Tomboy Survival Guide (Arsenal Pulp Press, 2016) was a Stonewall Book Award Honor Book and was longlisted for the 2017 British Columbia's National Award for Canadian Non-Fiction.

Rebent Sinner (Arsenal Pulp Press, 2019) is a collection of stories and personal essays that was favourably received. Coyote toured in 2019 with musician Sarah MacDougall, performing selections from the book along with music. The book was the inaugural winner of the Jim Deva Prize for Writing that Provokes from the BC and Yukon Book Prizes in 2020.

Care Of (Penguin Random House, 2021) is a collection of communications Coyote has received from audience members and the responses they have written in return.

== Reception ==
Coyote has made significant contributions to the representation of queerness in Canadian literature. Their first collection of short stories, Close to Spider Man, was a finalist for the Danuta Gleed Literary Award for short fiction, and it received widespread acclaim across the Canadian literary critic community for its semi-autobiographical depiction of young, queer women growing up in the Yukon. Their collection The Slow Fix was shortlisted for the Lambda Literary Award for Lesbian Fiction in 2008, and their collections One Man's Trash and Loose End received recognition, with outlets such as Herizons and the Lambda Book Report praising the brevity and directness of Coyote's writing as it relates to depictions of the complexities of gender, sexuality, and identity.

Bow Grip, Coyote's only full-length novel, was the winner of the 2007 ReLit Award for Best Novel and was a Stonewall Honor Book, as well as being shortlisted for the Ferro-Grumley Award. Persistence: All Ways Butch and Femme (2011), co-edited with Zena Sharman, was also a Stonewall Honor Book. Their 2016 autobiography Tomboy Survival Guide also garnered numerous accolades, being longlisted for the British Columbia's National Award for Canadian Non-Fiction and being named a 2017 Stonewall Honor Book.

Rebent Sinner (2019) was a finalist for the 2020 Governor General's Award for English-language non-fiction. It also won the Jim Deva Prize for Writing that Provokes.

== Bibliography ==
Title	Year published	Notes
Boys Like Her	1998	
Close to Spider Man	2000	
One Man's Trash	2002	
Loose End	2004	
Bow Grip	2006	
The Slow Fix	2008	
Missed Her	2010	
Persistence: All Ways Butch and Femme	2011	co-edited with Zena Sharman
One in Every Crowd	2012	
Gender Failure	2014	co-written with Rae Spoon; based on their 2012 live show
Tomboy Survival Guide	2016	
Rebent Sinner	2019	
Care Of	2021	
