= The Surfrajettes =

Canadian musical group

- Origin: Toronto, Ontario, Canada
- Genres: Surf rock, Instrumental rock
- Years active: 2015-present
- Label: Hi-Tide Recordings
- Members: Shermy Freeman; Nicole Damoff; Annie Lillis; Abby Jo Powell
- Past members: Sarah Butler; Sam Maloney; Anna Liebel; Amber Rutschmann; Laura Lunett
- Website: https://www.thesurfrajettes.com

The Surfrajettes are an instrumental surf rock band from Toronto.

== Biography ==
The Surfrajettes were formed in Toronto in 2015. Guitarist Nicole Damoff comes from a blues background. Damoff and Shermy Freeman have known each other since high school, with Damoff in the school blues band and Freeman being the first female guitar player in the school rock band. Bassist Sarah Butler previously played upright bass in Canadian rockabilly acts The Millwinders and Real Gone. The band has worked with a number of drummers. From 2023/4 the role was taken by Annie Lillis from The Beyonderers.

In 2018, the group gained attention for an instrumental surf cover of Britney Spears hit song "Toxic". In 2022, the group released their debut album Roller Fink. The album was recorded at The Woodshed Studio in Toronto with Colin Cripps, a member of surf group C&C Surf Factory, producing.

On July 9, 2024, the group announced a second album titled Easy as Pie. It was released through Hi-Tide Recordings on October 4, 2024.

== Members ==
=== Current members ===
- McKenzie "Shermy" Freeman – guitars (2015-present)
- Nicole Damoff – guitars (2015-present)
- Annie Lillis – drums (2023-present)
- Abby Jo Powell - bass (2024-present)

=== Past members ===
- Sarah Butler – bass (2016-2024)
- Samantha Maloney – drums (2021-2022)
- Anna Liebel – drums (2018-2021)
- Amber Rutschmann – drums (2015-2017)
- Laura Lunett – bass (2015-2016)

== Discography ==
- Roller Fink (Apr 22, 2022) - Released on Hi-Tide Recordings (HT-077), 33 1/3 RPM 12" vinyl LP
- Easy as Pie (Oct 4, 2024) - Released on Hi-Tide Recordings (HT-125), 33 1/3 RPM 12" vinyl LP
- Party with The Surfrajettes LIVE! (October 9, 2026) - Released on Hi-Tide Recordings (HT-147), 33 1/3 RPM 12" vinyl LP

=== Singles and EPs ===
- The Surfrajettes (EP) (Sep 27, 2017) - Released on Hi-Tide Recordings (NT-008), 45 RPM 7" vinyl EP
- "Party Line" / "Toxic" (Jun 19, 2020) - Released on Hi-Tide Recordings (HT-015), 45 RPM 7" vinyl EP
- "Hale’iwa Hustle" / "Banzai Pipeline" (Jun 19, 2020) - Released on Hi-Tide Recordings (HT-050), 45 RPM 7" vinyl single
- "Marshmallow March" / "All I Want for Christmas is You" (Nov 18, 2022) - Released on Hi-Tide Recordings (HT-089), 45 RPM 7" vinyl single
- "El Condor Pasa" (Sep 14, 2022) - Digitally Released by Hi-Tide Recordings
- "Banshee Bop" / "Satan's Holiday" (Sep 19, 2025) - Released on Hi-Tide Recordings (HT-126), 45 RPM 7" vinyl single
- "Hockey Night In Canada" (Nov 13, 2025) - Digitally Released by Hi-Tide Recordings
