= Atlin, British Columbia =

Atlin Wéinaa
- Unincorporated community
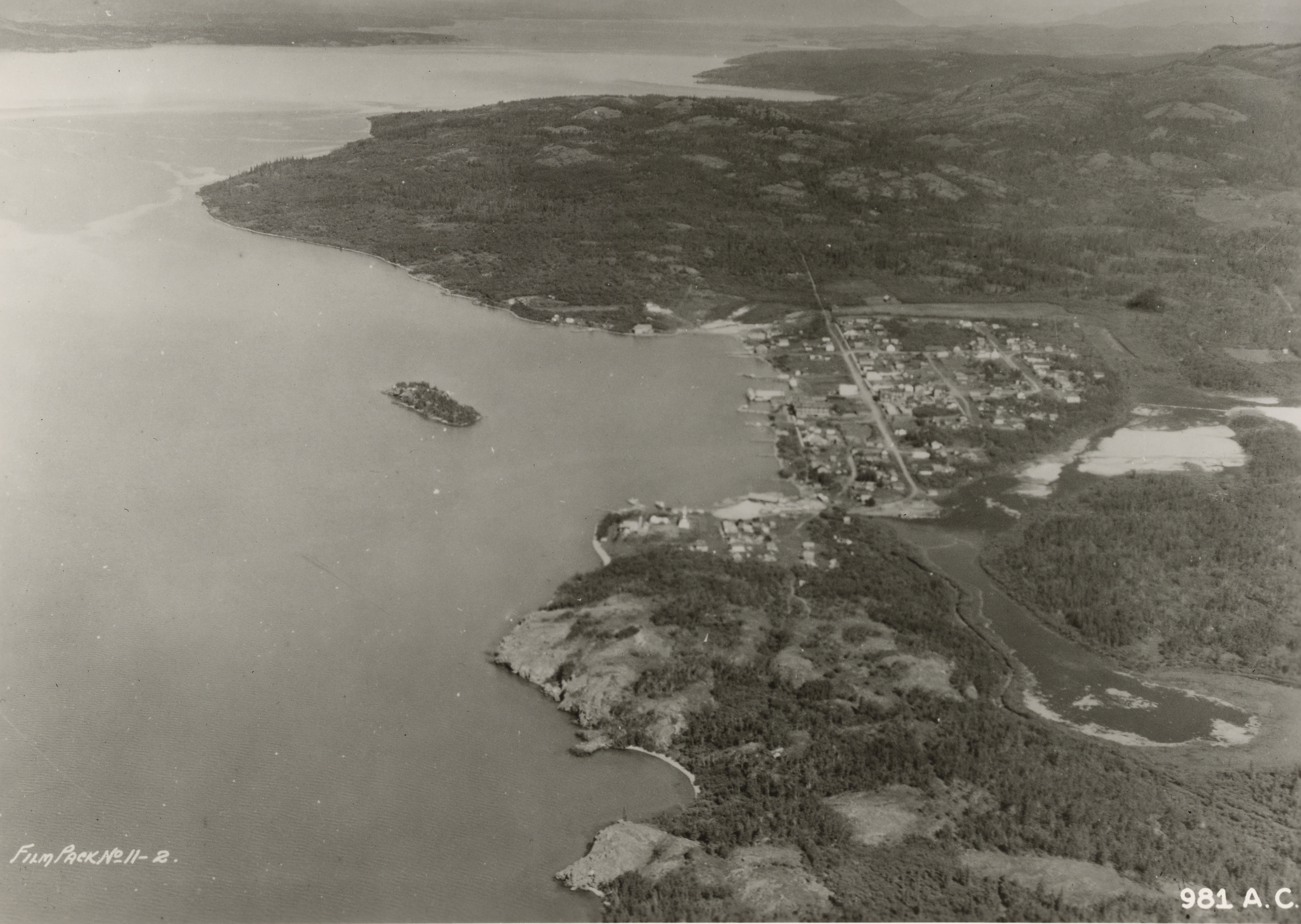
- Aerial view, ca. 1937

- Location of Atlin in British Columbia
- Coordinates: 59°35′N 133°43′W
- Country: Canada
- Province: British Columbia
- Region: Stikine Region

Area
  - Total: 3.66 km^{2} (1.41 sq mi)

Population (2021)
  - Total: 219
  - Density: 59.8/km^{2} (155/sq mi)
- (dissemination area)
- Time zone: UTC−07:00 (PT)
- Postal code: V0W 0A1 & V0W 1A0
- Area code: 250
- Telephone exchange: 651

Atlin (Tlingit: Wéinaa) is an unincorporated community in northwestern British Columbia, Canada, located on the eastern shore of Atlin Lake. It is the largest community in the Stikine Region, the only part of the province that is not within a municipality or regional district, and its only road connection is the Atlin Road from the Yukon. In addition to continued gold-mining activity, Atlin is a tourist destination for fishing, hiking, and other outdoor activities. In the 2021 census, the dissemination area covering the townsite had 219 residents, while the provincial government gives a population of 547 for the community including two Taku River Tlingit reserves.

The name comes from Áa Tlein, the Tlingit language word for "big body of water". (Note: The provincial geographical names office records that geologist George Mercer Dawson adopted the spelling "Atlin" in 1887, deriving it from the Tagish word A-tlin or from a Taku River Tlingit name meaning "big water". BC Parks gives a different derivation, from a word Ah-lah meaning "stormy weather".) The surrounding area has been used by Inland Tlingit people for many years and the community is home to the Taku River Tlingit First Nation. Since 2009, most of the community's electricity has come from a hydroelectric plant on Pine Creek owned by the First Nation.

Every July, the town hosts the Atlin Arts & Music Festival in Tarahne Park, although the festival was not held in 2010 or from 2020 to 2023.

== History ==
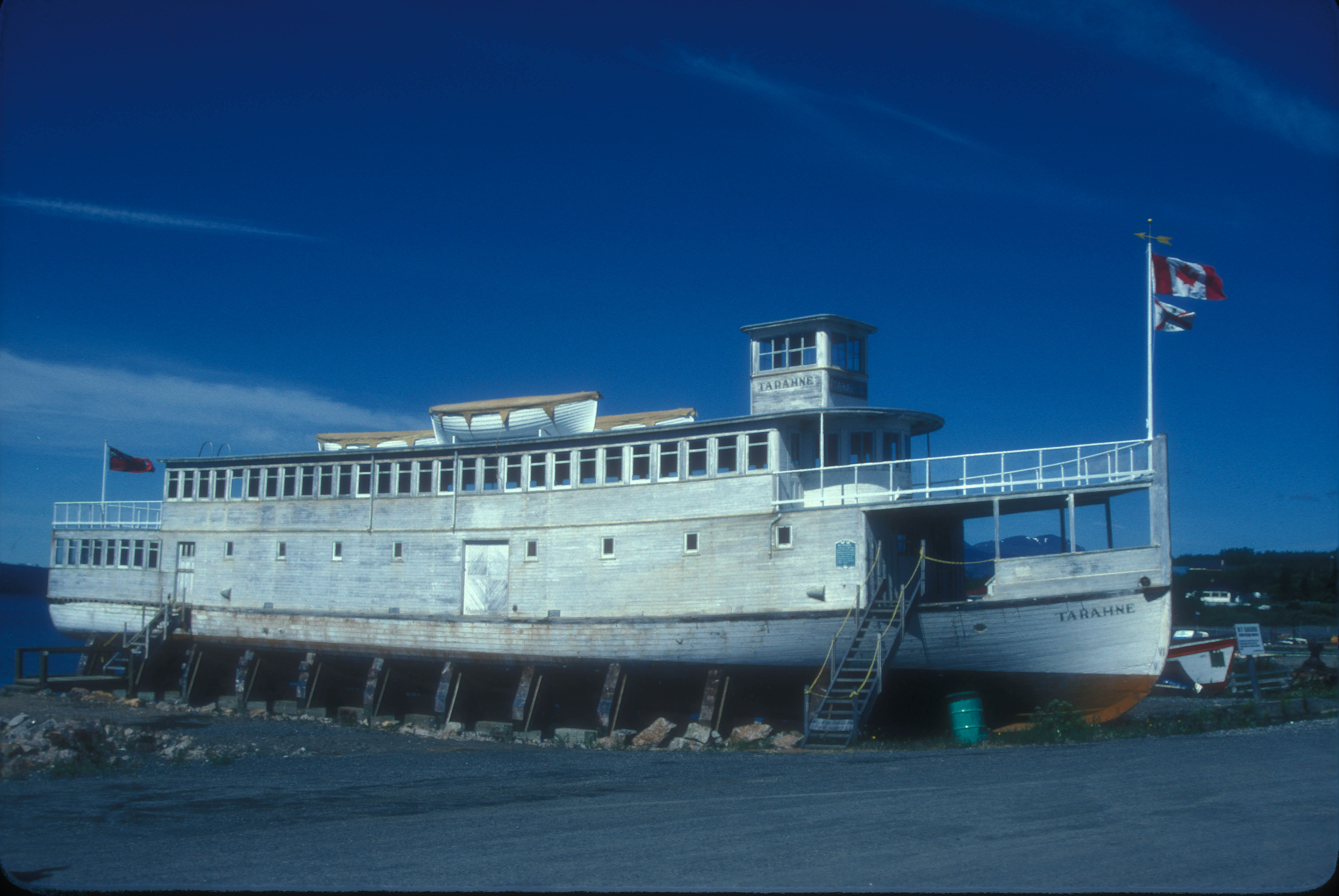
M.V. Tarahne, a 1920s lake boat in Atlin

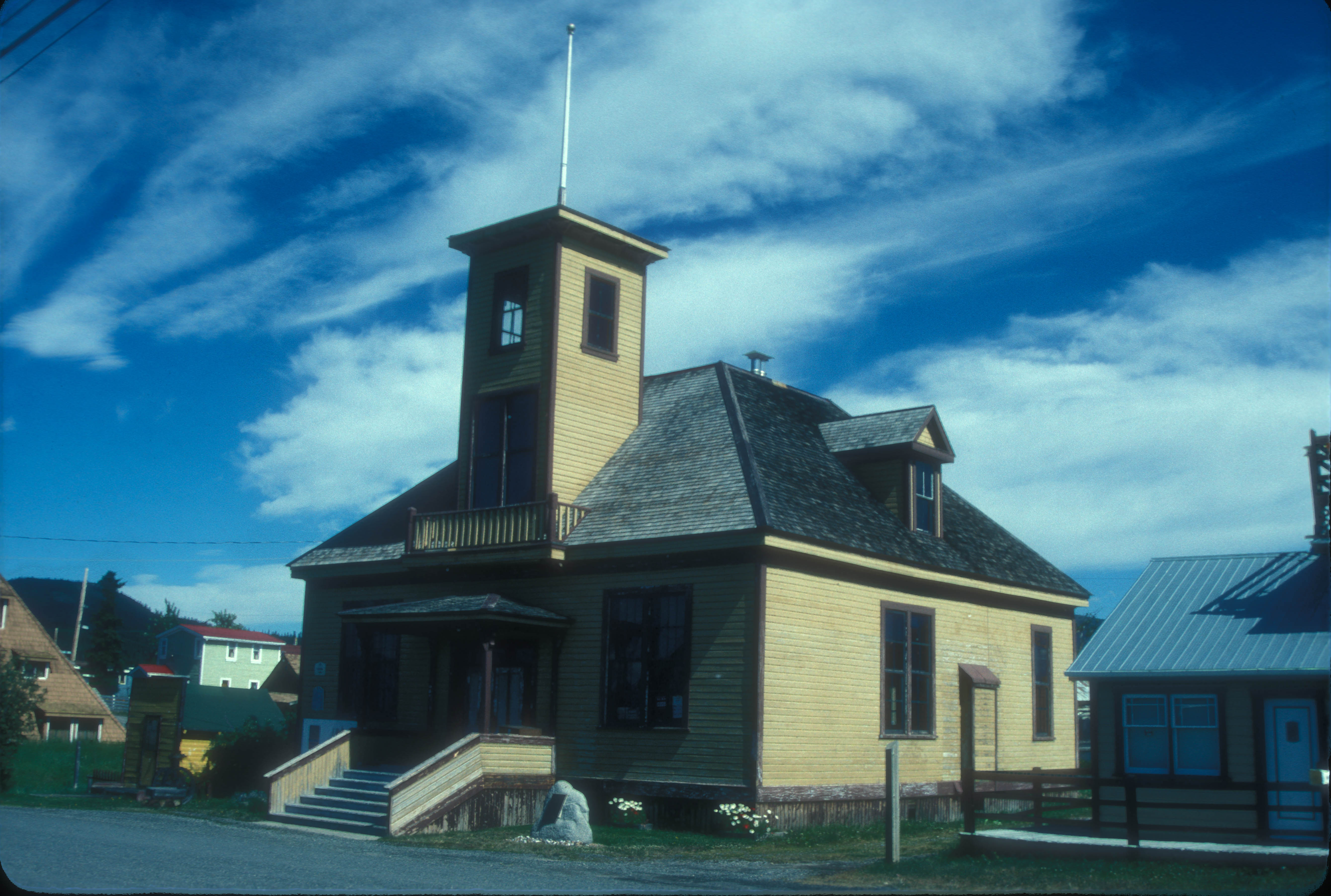
Atlin Courthouse, built 1900, is now an art gallery.

The Atlin Lake area has been used by the Taku River Tlingit for many years, and several archaeological and cultural sites lie within the nearby provincial park. The first European to see the lake is thought to have been Michael Byrne, an explorer for the Western Union Telegraph Company, who reached its southern end from the Taku River in 1867.

The exact time when prospectors arrived in Atlin is unknown. George Miller is supposed to be the first person to have learned of the presence of gold within the area surrounding Atlin. The two men most commonly referred to as the "founders" of Atlin are Frederick Miller (Note: Also known as Fritz Miller.) and Kenneth McLaren, who staked claims along the nearby Pine Creek in 1898. The Atlin Gold Rush came to Atlin Lake country in 1898 and was one of the richest offshoots of the Klondike Gold Rush. By the end of the mining season of 1899, around 5,000 people had flocked to the region and Atlin became a busy and important settlement, centre of the Atlin Mining District, and one of the flash-points of the Alaska boundary dispute. "Although production was greatest in its early years, the Atlin field still produces today. Total placer gold production has exceeded $23,000,000."

In the 1920s, Atlin was popular as an exotic tourist destination. There was no road to the settlement, requiring tourists to travel up the Inside Passage through the British Columbia Coast and the Alaska Panhandle and via passes through Alaska and a series of lakes in Yukon and British Columbia. The journey ended when the M.V. Tarahne (and other lake boats) took the tourists across the lake to stay at the large three storey Atlin Inn (built by the White Pass and Yukon Route company). It was during this time it was nicknamed the "Switzerland of the North" because it is surrounded by mountains in much the same way as Switzerland. During the Great Depression, tourism decreased and the White Pass and Yukon Route closed their transportation routes and hotel. Atlin was largely isolated from transportation and commerce until the Atlin Road was built in 1949.

The Atlin Historical Society was formed in 1972 to preserve and present the community's history, and it maintains several of the town's historic buildings and vessels. Run-of-river turbines that had supplied the town's electricity since the 1920s were replaced in 1978 by a diesel generating station. In the 21st century, the Taku River Tlingit First Nation completed a hydroelectric plant on Pine Creek in 2009, concluded land use and shared decision-making agreements with the province in 2011, and worked with Northwestel and Bell Mobility to bring the community its first cellular service and fibre-optic internet in 2024 and 2025.

== Geography ==
Atlin is on the eastern shore of Atlin Lake, about 171 kilometres (106 mi) southeast of Whitehorse. Although the community is in British Columbia, the only road into it comes from the Yukon, and many residents feel more closely connected to the territory than to the rest of the province. Atlin Mountain, across the lake from the town, is a landmark in views from the community and lies within Atlin/Áa Tlein Téix'i Park, a provincial park that can be reached only by boat or aircraft. The island just west of the community, known as First Island until 2023, was officially renamed Wéinaa X'áat'i at the request of the Taku River Tlingit First Nation; the Tlingit name means "alkali place island" and refers to alkali found in the area's soil.

Atlin officially observes British Columbia time. After the Yukon stopped changing its clocks in 2020, Atlin fell an hour behind the territory each winter, and in 2021 residents voted overwhelmingly to remain on Yukon time year-round. The practice was not universal: in 2024 most businesses and the Taku River Tlingit First Nation used Yukon time, while the local RCMP and some residents kept Pacific time. The discrepancy ended in 2026, when British Columbia adopted permanent time at UTC−07:00 after the clocks changed on March 8, aligning the province with the Yukon year-round.

== Demographics ==
In the 2021 Census of Population conducted by Statistics Canada, the dissemination area had a population of 219 living in 129 of its 279 total private dwellings, a change of −9.1% from its 2016 population of 241. With a land area of 3.66 square kilometres (1.41 sq mi), it had a population density of 59.8 per square kilometre (155/sq mi) in 2021.

The dissemination area covers only the townsite. The provincial government gives a population of 547 for the community of Atlin including two Taku River Tlingit reserves, out of about 740 people in the Stikine Region as a whole. In 2011, about 375 members of the Taku River Tlingit First Nation lived in Atlin.

== Government ==
Atlin is unincorporated and has no municipal government. It lies in the Stikine Region, which was left outside the regional district system when that system was established in the late 1960s because the area lacked the population and property assessment base to support a regional district. The provincial minister responsible for local government has general oversight of the region. Roads, health care and policing are provided by the province. The only local authority is the Atlin Community Improvement District, established in 1967, which provides drainage, fire protection, sidewalks, solid waste disposal, street lighting and waterworks. In 2008 its boundaries were extended to include the Atlin Community Planning Area, giving it an advisory role in representing the community's interests to provincial agencies on land use matters. Other services, including bulk water delivery, recreation and the museum, are run by private operators or local societies, and the Atlin District Board of Trade is also active in local affairs.

The Taku River Tlingit First Nation, known as the Atlin band until 1985, is based in the community. Its traditional territory covers more than four million hectares across British Columbia, the Yukon and Alaska. In July 2011, after litigation over the province's 1998 approval of a mine and access road in the Taku watershed had reached the Supreme Court of Canada, the First Nation and the province signed Wóoshtin wudidaa ("flowing together"), the Atlin Taku Land Use Plan, together with Wóoshtin yan too.aat ("walking together"), a government-to-government agreement on land and resource management and shared decision-making that the province described as the first of its kind in British Columbia. The plan covers about three million hectares, including the Atlin Lake and Taku River watersheds, and established 13 new protected areas, among them the Atlin River and Monarch Mountain near the community. An order under the Environment and Land Use Act gave legal effect to the plan's resource management direction in 2014.

Because there is no local government responsible for emergency management, the provincial Ministry of Emergency Management and Climate Readiness and the Taku River Tlingit First Nation jointly decide on evacuation alerts and orders, working with the RCMP, BC Emergency Health Services, the Atlin Volunteer Fire Department, search and rescue and the BC Wildfire Service. In June 2025 the province placed an area along the Atlin Road about 25 kilometres (16 mi) north of the community on evacuation alert because of the Glacier Creek wildfire; the alert was rescinded on June 30.

== Economy ==
Economic activity in the Stikine Region, of which Atlin is the main community, includes mining, wilderness tourism, trapping and commercial fishing. Placer gold has been mined in the Atlin camp continuously since its discovery in 1898. Spruce Creek was the camp's most productive creek, yielding 262,603 troy ounces of gold between 1898 and 1946, while Pine Creek produced 138,144 troy ounces between 1898 and 1916. BC Parks ranks the Atlin field second only to the Cariboo in the history of placer gold production in British Columbia.

Atlin Lake supports lake trout, Arctic grayling, Dolly Varden and whitefish, and Atlin/Áa Tlein Téix'i Park offers hiking trails, paddling, hunting and winter recreation.

== Infrastructure ==
=== Transportation ===
Atlin can be reached via the Atlin Road (Yukon Territorial Highway 7; no number in B.C.) that is maintained jointly by the British Columbia and Yukon governments. At its Yukon terminus, the Atlin Road connects to the Tagish Road and the Alaska Highway (Highway 1). It can also be reached through Atlin Airport. Prior to the 1949 construction of the Atlin Road by the Canadian Army, Atlin was reached overland by two lake steamers, the Tutshi and Tarahne, with a two-mile rail line between the lakes they plied, until the 1930s, then was isolated. The rail line, known as the Taku Tram, ran from Scotia Bay on Atlin Lake to Taku Landing on Tagish Lake, and its route is now a hiking trail in Atlin/Áa Tlein Téix'i Park. The Tarahne carried passengers and freight between Atlin and Scotia Bay until 1936. Federal funding for the road was allocated in 1949, and it opened to public traffic that December at a cost of $679,000.

=== Telecommunications and broadcasting ===
Atlin landline telephone service is provided by Northwestel, following a purchase from the incumbent Telus Communications in November 2023. Before 2024, the community had no cellular service or terrestrial internet. Satellite internet is provided by the local ISP Atlin Community Network, Xplornet, and more recently Starlink. Northwestel completed a fibre-optic transport link to Atlin in December 2024, funded by the company, the province and the CRTC's Broadband Fund. The link enabled Bell Mobility cellular service, which went live on December 15, 2024, on an LTE network that is also available to Telus customers and, through roaming, to Rogers customers. In June 2025, Northwestel began offering fibre-to-the-home internet with speeds of up to 1 Gbps, the first in its service area, along with television and telephone service over fibre.

Atlin has a radio repeater carrying CBC Radio One, and used to have a community-owned television transmitter carrying CBC Television by satellite; when first established, the CBC TV signal was relayed from Whitehorse by a repeater on White Mountain near Jake's Corner.

=== Electricity ===
Atlin is not connected to BC Hydro's main grid. Run-of-river turbines supplied the community from the 1920s until 1978, when BC Hydro built a diesel generating station, which it still operates along with the local distribution system. In 2009 the Taku River Tlingit First Nation completed a 2.1-megawatt hydroelectric plant on Pine Creek, which flows from Surprise Lake to Atlin Lake. The plant is run by Xeitl Limited Partnership, a corporation owned by the First Nation, and sells its output to BC Hydro under a 25-year energy purchase agreement. It supplies most of the community's electricity and avoids the burning of more than one million litres of diesel fuel a year, although the diesel plant is still used during winter peaks and outages, and rising winter demand has increased reliance on it.

The Tlingit Homeland Energy Limited Partnership (THELP), also owned by the First Nation, has proposed the Atlin Hydro Expansion Project, which would enlarge the existing powerhouse, build a second, lower powerhouse, and use storage at Surprise Lake to raise generating capacity on Pine Creek from 2.1 to about 10 megawatts. (Note: Reported figures for the expanded plant vary between sources and over time, including 10.5 MW and 10.6 MW. Yukon Energy expects the project to add about 8 MW of dependable capacity to the Yukon grid.) The additional power would be sold to Yukon Energy to meet the Yukon's winter demand, through a new transmission line following the Atlin Road to Jakes Corner. The Taku River Tlingit First Nation endorsed the project in a clan directive in December 2020, subject to environmental permitting, and in February 2022 Yukon Energy signed a 40-year electricity purchase agreement with THELP. The Yukon government committed a $50-million grant, and the federal government committed $193 million, including $80 million from the Canada Infrastructure Bank. The estimated cost rose from $206 million in early 2022 to about $310 million later that year and about $360 million by 2024, leaving a funding gap of $86 million. A Yukon Utilities Board review in 2022 found that the purchase agreement could raise Yukon electricity rates. The Yukon government left the project out of its 2024–25 and 2025–26 budgets, the latter because construction permits had not yet been issued. As of September 2025, THELP was still pursuing the expansion.

=== Health care and education ===
The Atlin Health Centre, operated by Northern Health, offers nurse-led primary care, emergency care, basic laboratory services and public health services, with one or two clinics a month held by visiting physicians from the Yukon and virtual physician support for emergencies and referrals. Ambulance service is provided by BC Ambulance. Atlin School, operated by School District 87 Stikine, teaches students from kindergarten to grade 12.

== Arts and culture ==
The Atlin Arts & Music Festival is held each July in Tarahne Park; the 2018 edition was the festival's fifteenth. The Taku River Tlingit First Nation traditionally opens and closes the festival and takes part in its performances. The festival was cancelled in 2020 and 2021 because of the COVID-19 pandemic, and during the 2021 season a concert series was instead filmed in the Globe Theatre and aboard the Tarahne. The 2022 festival was also cancelled; the festival's board said the pause had given it a chance to reconsider an event that many felt had grown too large. A scaled-back 2023 festival was called off a month after being announced, partly because the Taku River Tlingit First Nation was hosting the Haa Ḵusteeyí Tlingit cultural celebration in Atlin around the same time. The festival has since resumed.

The Atlin Historical Society, a volunteer-run charity, owns and maintains several historic buildings and vessels and operates the Atlin Museum, which occupies the town's original one-room schoolhouse. Its holdings include the MV Tarahne, built at Atlin by the White Pass and Yukon Route. (Note: Sources differ on the year the Tarahne was built: The Milepost gives 1916, while ExploreNorth gives 1917.) The Globe Theatre, built in 1917, has been restored and is again used for performances.

== Climate ==
Atlin has a subarctic climate (Köppen Dsc) with long, cold winters and short, mild summers. The westerly location and minor Pacific influence, however, make the winters markedly less severe than in most of northern Canada, and the town is among the northernmost in Canada with a mean annual temperature above 0 °C (32 °F). Precipitation is generally light, with about 200 millimetres (7.9 in) of actual rainfall per year, and a snowfall less than that of markedly milder Juneau on the coast.

Climate data for Atlin, British Columbia (1981-2010 normals, extremes 1899-2007): 673m
Month	Jan	Feb	Mar	Apr	May	Jun	Jul	Aug	Sep	Oct	Nov	Dec	Year
Record high °C (°F)	7.2 (45.0)	10.6 (51.1)	13.0 (55.4)	20.0 (68.0)	26.7 (80.1)	31.0 (87.8)	30.0 (86.0)	30.0 (86.0)	26.7 (80.1)	19.5 (67.1)	13.3 (55.9)	10.0 (50.0)	31.0 (87.8)
Mean daily maximum °C (°F)	−9.1 (15.6)	−6.1 (21.0)	−0.3 (31.5)	6.7 (44.1)	12.5 (54.5)	17.2 (63.0)	19.0 (66.2)	17.5 (63.5)	12.3 (54.1)	5.7 (42.3)	−2.5 (27.5)	−5.0 (23.0)	5.7 (42.2)
Daily mean °C (°F)	−12.8 (9.0)	−10.7 (12.7)	−5.5 (22.1)	1.3 (34.3)	6.9 (44.4)	11.3 (52.3)	13.4 (56.1)	12.4 (54.3)	8.1 (46.6)	2.6 (36.7)	−5.5 (22.1)	−8.1 (17.4)	1.1 (34.0)
Mean daily minimum °C (°F)	−16.5 (2.3)	−15.3 (4.5)	−10.7 (12.7)	−4.1 (24.6)	1.3 (34.3)	5.3 (41.5)	7.8 (46.0)	7.3 (45.1)	3.8 (38.8)	−0.6 (30.9)	−8.4 (16.9)	−11.2 (11.8)	−3.4 (25.8)
Record low °C (°F)	−47.8 (−54.0)	−47.2 (−53.0)	−39.4 (−38.9)	−31.1 (−24.0)	−10.0 (14.0)	−3.9 (25.0)	−1.1 (30.0)	−2.2 (28.0)	−11.1 (12.0)	−26.7 (−16.1)	−33.3 (−27.9)	−50.0 (−58.0)	−50.0 (−58.0)
Average precipitation mm (inches)	45.6 (1.80)	25.4 (1.00)	17.4 (0.69)	9.4 (0.37)	18.2 (0.72)	29.7 (1.17)	32.8 (1.29)	34.2 (1.35)	42.0 (1.65)	37.4 (1.47)	36.1 (1.42)	36.4 (1.43)	364.7 (14.36)
Average rainfall mm (inches)	1.4 (0.06)	1.3 (0.05)	0.5 (0.02)	3.0 (0.12)	17.2 (0.68)	29.7 (1.17)	32.8 (1.29)	34.2 (1.35)	40.7 (1.60)	27.9 (1.10)	9.1 (0.36)	3.2 (0.13)	200.8 (7.91)
Average snowfall cm (inches)	44.2 (17.4)	24.1 (9.5)	16.9 (6.7)	6.4 (2.5)	1.0 (0.4)	0.0 (0.0)	0.0 (0.0)	0.0 (0.0)	1.3 (0.5)	9.5 (3.7)	27.1 (10.7)	33.2 (13.1)	163.9 (64.5)
Average precipitation days (≥ 0.2 mm)	12.2	8.4	7.4	3.7	8.0	9.4	10.9	11.7	12.8	12.6	11.8	12.4	121.3
Average rainy days (≥ 0.2 mm)	0.7	0.5	0.5	1.7	7.8	9.4	10.9	11.7	12.7	9.4	1.9	1.1	68.1
Average snowy days (≥ 0.2 cm)	11.8	8.2	7.0	2.3	0.4	0.1	0.0	0.0	0.4	4.2	10.5	11.5	56.3
Source: ECCC

== Television ==
Atlin was featured on the historical television series Gold Trails and Ghost Towns, season 1, episode 9.

== See also ==
- Atlin Volcanic Field
- Atlin Arts & Music Festival
