= Atlin Lake =

Lake in British Columbia, Canada

- Áa Tlein (Tlingit)
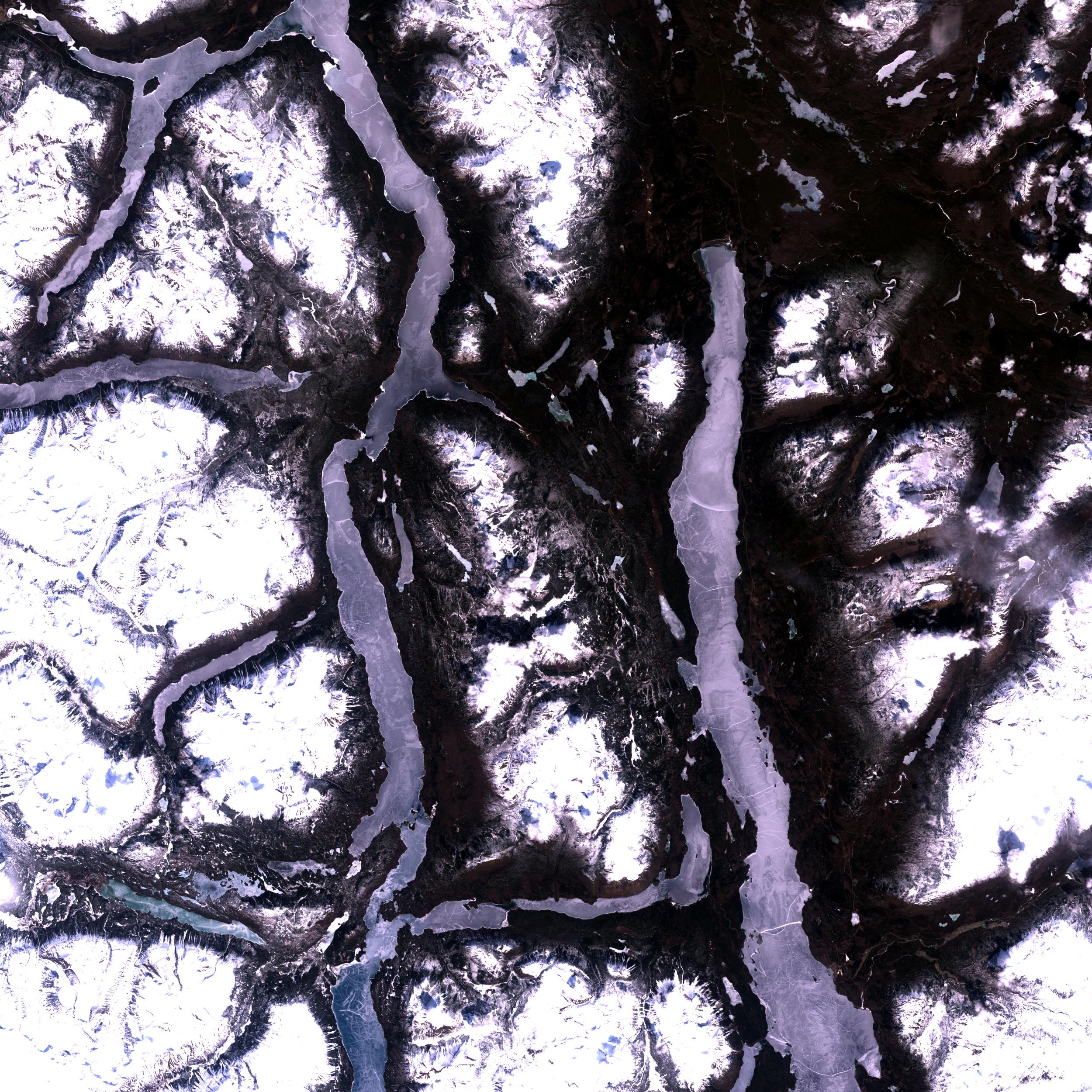
- A portion of Atlin Lake (on the right half of the image) during the winter, as seen from space. The lake seen on the left half of the image is Tagish Lake

- Location within British Columbia Location within Canada
- Location: Atlin District, northwestern British Columbia
- Coordinates: 59°30′N 133°45′W
- Primary inflows: O Donnel River, Pike River, Llewellyn Glacier
- Primary outflows: Atlin River
- Basin countries: Canada
- Max. length: 137 km (85 mi)
- Max. width: 6.5 km (4 mi)
- Surface area: 791 km^{2} (305 sq mi)
- Max. depth: 289 m (948 ft)
- Surface elevation: 669 m (2,195 ft)
- Settlements: Atlin

Atlin Lake (Tlingit: Áa Tlein) is the largest natural lake in the Canadian province of British Columbia. The lake is 6.44 kilometres (4.00 mi) wide and 137 kilometres (85 mi) long. The northern tip of the lake is in the Yukon, as is Little Atlin Lake. However, most of the lake lies within the Atlin District of British Columbia. Atlin Lake is generally considered to be the source of the Yukon River. However, it is drained via the short Atlin River into Tagish Lake. Atlin Lake was named by the Tlingit First Nation people of the region.

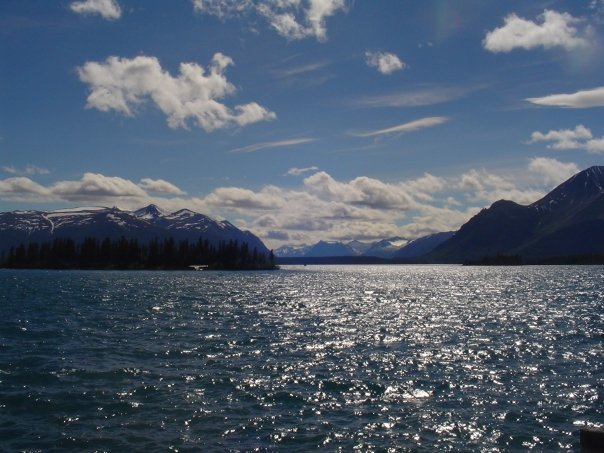
View of Atlin Lake

The name comes from Áa Tlein (in Canadian spelling Â Tłèn), the Tlingit name meaning simply "big lake".

The community of Atlin is located on the eastern shore of the lake. The southern part of the lake is in the Atlin Provincial Park and Recreation Area.

== See also ==
- List of lakes of British Columbia
- Atlin Mountain
