= Geospatial summary of the High Peaks/Summits of the Juneau Icefield =

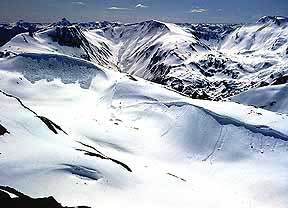
View of the Juneau Icefield

The geospatial summary of the High Peaks/Summits of the Juneau Icefield is a compilation of the basic geospatial properties (location, elevation and prominence) of the peaks/summits within the general area of the Juneau Icefield located North and East of Juneau, Alaska extending north to Skagway, Alaska. The peaks are classified by elevation: 2000 m, 2050 m, 2100 m, 2150 m, 2200 m, 2250 m, 2300 m and above 2400 m. Most (216, 79%) of the 272 summits compiled have not been assigned an official name by the United States Geological Survey (USGS) Geographic Names Information System (GNIS) and as such are delineated as "Un-Named" (UNP in the KML file).

In addition, select minor peaks are included to report those that are contained within the GNIS database and to permit assigning a location marker (coordinate) for Nunatak identification and ridge delineation for the USGS Hydrologic Unit Code boundaries for cross referencing these areal shapes to a single coordinate.

The elevation of the peaks and summits of the Juneau Icefield was determined by referencing multiple sources including:

- GNIS database
- BC Geographical Names (BCGN) database
- USGS topographic maps
- United States Forest Service (USFS) topographic maps
- Natural Resources Canada (NRC) topographic maps
- Peakbagger.com with cross-referencing to USGS and USFS
- Selected other sources (such as scientific papers).

The GNIS database consistently reports the peak elevation lower than the referenced USGS and/or USFS topographic maps. The topographic maps also report lower elevations than selected GPS measurements conducted by personnel of the Juneau Icefield Research Program, but not to the degree of the GNIS database.

In this article, the topographic map values were used to report elevation above mean sea level (MSL), unless a more accurate GPS measurement was available.

== Juneau Icefield High Peaks summary ==
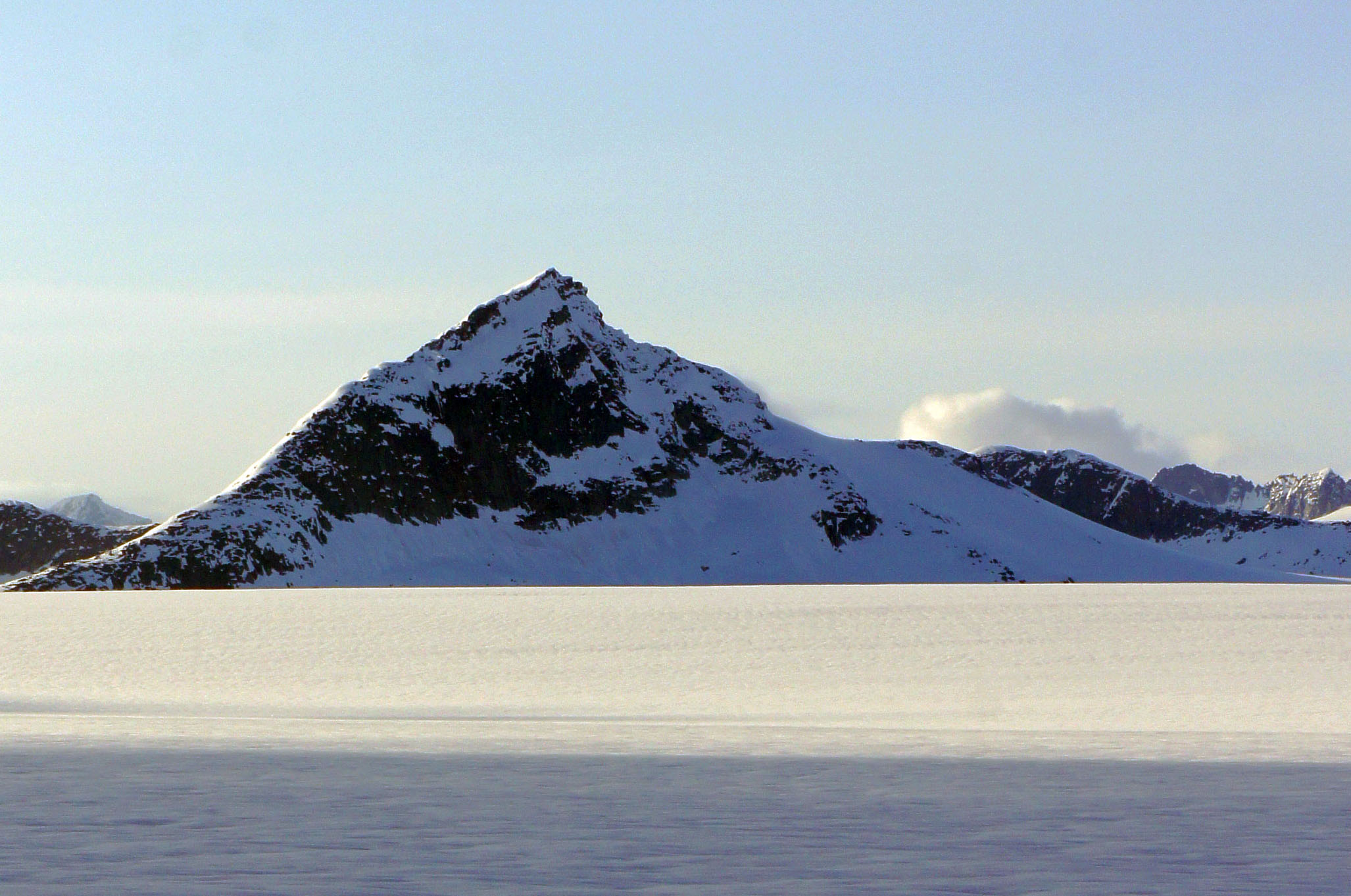
South-East face of Taku D Peak, from the perspective of Taku glacier.

High Peaks summary
Altitude range	Peak count	% Total	Climbed	Un-Named
6,562 ft (2,000 m) - 6,726 ft (2,050 m)	63	23.2%	7	56
6,726 ft (2,050 m) - 6,890 ft (2,100 m)	50	18.4%	10	40
6,890 ft (2,100 m) - 7,054 ft (2,150 m)	53	19.5%	4	48
7,054 ft (2,150 m) - 7,218 ft (2,200 m)	36	13.2%	3	32
7,218 ft (2,200 m) - 7,382 ft (2,250 m)	31	11.4%	2	24
7,382 ft (2,250 m) - 7,546 ft (2,300 m)	19	7%	1	8
7,546 ft (2,300 m) - 7,874 ft (2,400 m)	17	6.3%	3	8
Above 7,874 ft (2,400 m)	3	1.1%	2	0
Total	262	100.0%	24	216

== Summits below 2000 m ==
The following table contains selected peaks within the boundaries of the Juneau Icefield that have an elevation range below 2,000 m (6,562 ft). These are included for Nunatak topography determination purposes.

There are 74 peaks within this elevation range. There has been 1 peak that has been ascended. There are 23 named peaks. There are 51 peaks that have not been named.

Select summits below 2000 m
Name		Coordinates	Elevation	Elevation by Source			Official name		First ascent		Second ascent		PRM (Note: Peakbagger.com database)	CT (Note: CalTopo Mapping System)	Remarks
Official	Alt			GNIS	Topo	Other	GNIS	BCGN	Group	Date	Group	Date			Notes
BP 111	BP-111	59°28′29″N 135°01′39″W	6,386 ft (1,946 m)	6,270 ft	6,386 ft		1420614								
Brassiere Hills		58°27′40″N 134°02′44″W	2,406 ft (733 m)	1,591 ft	2,406 ft		1399436								
Cairn Peak		58°21′35″N 134°22′30″W	4,505 ft (1,373 m)		4,505 ft		1399673								
Camp-4 Peak		58°36′39″N 133°57′25″W	5,080 ft (1,548 m)	4,531 ft	5,080 ft		1420789								
Camp-15 Peak		58°41′32″N 134°33′59″W	5,905 ft (1,800 m)		5,905 ft		1420788								
Couloir Peak		58°43′16″N 133°55′20″W	6,227 ft (1,898 m)	5,817 ft	6,227 ft		1421239								
Dike Mountain		58°39′16″N 134°35′37″W	6,371 ft (1,942 m)	6,004 ft	1,942 m		1421465								
Flower Tower		58°39′05″N 134°22′35″W	5,830 ft (1,777 m)		5,830 ft		1421992								
Glacier King	58.42.34	58°42′34″N 134°28′13″W	6,400 ft (1,951 m)	5,869 ft	6,400 ft	1481.238 m	1422174								
Guardian Mountain		58°30′22″N 134°14′48″W	5,060 ft (1,542 m)	4,495 ft	5,060 ft		1422349								
Hodgkins Peak		58°35′27″N 134°02′54″W	5,800 ft (1,768 m)	5,715 ft	5,800 ft		1422607						43950		
Mammary Peak		58°49′00″N 134°16′00″W	6,404 ft (1,952 m)	6,604 ft (Note: Possibly a typographic error by USGS.)	6,404 ft		1895556								
Mount Adams		59°06′09″N 133°54′16″W	6,500 ft (1,981 m)		6,500 ft										
Mustang Peak		58°38′43″N 134°35′29″W	6,378 ft (1,944 m)	6,319 ft	1,944 m		1423849								
Nugget Mountain		58°25′39″N 134°21′23″W	5,587 ft (1,703 m)	5,364 ft	5,587 ft		1407307								
Rhino Peak		58°33′31″N 134°26′23″W	5,914 ft (1,803 m)	5,761 ft	5,914 ft		1424821						37782		
Shoehorn Mountain		58°36′09″N 134°18′12″W	5,310 ft (1,618 m)		5,310 ft	1326.342 m	1414684								
Slanting Peak		58°32′12″N 134°12′58″W	5,200 ft (1,585 m)	4,662 ft	1,585 m		1414772								
Snowpatch Crag		58°39′08″N 134°29′25″W	6,345 ft (1,934 m)	5,764 ft	6,345 ft		1877211								
Sparrow Peak		59°08′46″N 134°26′36″W	6,168 ft (1,880 m)		1,880 m										
Split Thumb		58°24′23″N 134°19′11″W	5,523 ft (1,683 m)	5,138 ft	5,523 ft		1410028								
Stronghold Peak		58°45′26″N 134°16′24″W	6,310 ft (1,923 m)	6,014 ft	6,310 ft		1415041								
Taku Towers
	Taku A														
	Taku B														
	Taku C														
	Taku D	58°35′52″N 134°22′07″W	6,605 ft (2,013 m)		5,810 ft		1415174		Schuster	1952					Taku Towers
Vantage Peak		58°39′19″N 134°09′53″W	5,585 ft (1,702 m)	5,167 ft	5,585 ft	1709.737 m	1415544								
Un-Named Peaks
Un-Named Peak	58.31.4	58°31′04″N 134°22′09″W	5,500 ft (1,676 m)		5,500 ft										
Un-Named Peak	58.32.30	58°32′30″N 134°22′42″W	5,905 ft (1,800 m)		5,905 ft										
Un-Named Peak	58.32.45	58°32′45″N 134°03′38″W	4,540 ft (1,384 m)		4,540 ft										Goat Ridge
Un-Named Peak	58.35.31	58°35′31″N 134°01′00″W	5,300 ft (1,615 m)		5,300 ft										
Un-Named Peak	58.35.53	58°35′53″N 134°32′13″W	6,300 ft (1,920 m)		6,300 ft										
Un-Named Peak	58.37.20	58°37′20″N 134°36′41″W	5,847 ft (1,782 m)		5,847 ft										
Un-Named Peak	58.38.44	58°38′44″N 133°54′26″W	5,300 ft (1,615 m)		5,300 ft										part of Antler Peaks
Un-Named Peak	58.39.34	58°39′34″N 133°59′38″W	5,960 ft (1,817 m)		5,960 ft										
Un-Named Peak	58.40.19	58°40′19″N 133°53′01″W	5,500 ft (1,676 m)		5,500 ft										part of Horn Peaks
Un-Named Peak	58.40.48	58°40′48″N 134°45′10″W	5,600 ft (1,707 m)		5,600 ft										
Un-Named Peak	58.41.43	58°41′43″N 133°50′40″W	5,750 ft (1,753 m)		5,750 ft										
Un-Named Peak	58.42.28	58°42′28″N 134°31′50″W	5,000 ft (1,524 m)		5,000 ft										See Note: (Note: This peak seems to have an almost near vertical face of more than 2,000 ft on the north side)
Un-Named Peak	58.43.12	58°43′12″N 134°00′36″W	5,650 ft (1,722 m)		5,650 ft										
Un-Named Peak	58.43.24	58°43′24″N 134°02′33″W	5,370 ft (1,637 m)		5,370 ft										
Un-Named Peak	58.43.36	58°43′36″N 134°25′09″W	5,340 ft (1,628 m)		5,340 ft										
Un-Named Peak	58.45.57	58°45′57″N 134°14′24″W	5,332 ft (1,625 m)		5,332 ft										
Un-Named Peak	58.48.16	58°48′16″N 134°36′01″W	6,500 ft (1,981 m)		6,500 ft										
Un-Named Peak	58.53.58	58°53′58″N 134°37′55″W	5,678 ft (1,731 m)		5,678 ft										
Un-Named Peak	58.57.8	58°57′08″N 133°21′54″W	1,882 ft (574 m)		1,882 m										
Un-Named Peak	58.57.32	58°57′32″N 134°26′07″W	5,800 ft (1,768 m)		5,800 ft										Snow covered
Un-Named Peak	59.2.11	59°02′11″N 134°24′25″W	6,237 ft (1,901 m)		1,901 m										near Mt London
Un-Named Peak	59.2.50	59°02′50″N 133°49′01″W	6,289 ft (1,917 m)		1,917 m										
Un-Named Peak	59.4.12	59°04′12″N 134°41′32″W	5,332 ft (1,625 m)		5,332 ft										
Un-Named Peak	59.6.51	59°06′51″N 134°23′04″W	6,430 ft (1,960 m)		1,960 m										
Un-Named Peak	59.6.51	59°06′51″N 135°06′59″W	5,977 ft (1,822 m)		5,977 ft										
Un-Named Peak	59.6.55	59°6′55″N 134°35′20″W	6,291 ft (1,917 m)		6,291 ft										
Un-Named Peak	59.7.18	59°07′18″N 134°31′56″W	6,237 ft (1,901 m)		1,901 m										
Un-Named Peak	59.7.22	59°07′22″N 134°23′26″W	6,362 ft (1,939 m)		1,939 m										
Un-Named Peak	59.8.17	59°08′17″N 134°26′57″W	6,427 ft (1,959 m)		1,959 m										West of Willison Gl
Un-Named Peak	59.8.23	59°08′23″N 134°27′32″W	6,362 ft (1,939 m)		1,939 m										
Un-Named Peak	59.8.59	59°08′59″N 134°03′19″W	6,470 ft (1,972 m)		1,972 m										
Un-Named Peak	59.9.36	59°09′36″N 134°37′45″W	6,395 ft (1,949 m)		6,395 ft										
Un-Named Peak	59.10.3	59°10′03″N 134°32′59″W	6,430 ft (1,960 m)		1,960 m										
Un-Named Peak	59.10.16	59°10′16″N 133°38′59″W	5,584 ft (1,702 m)		1,702 m										
Un-Named Peak	59.12.26	59°12′26″N 134°22′47″W	6,430 ft (1,960 m)		1,960 m										
Un-Named Peak	59.13.13	59°13′13″N 134°39′12″W	6,345 ft (1,934 m)		1,934 m										
Un-Named Peak	59.13.35	59°13′35″N 134°40′51″W	6,483 ft (1,976 m)		1,978 m										
Un-Named Peak	59.14.2	59°14′2″N 134°46′12″W	6,110 ft (1,862 m)		6,110 ft										
Un-Named Peak	59.14.24	59°14′24″N 134°38′07″W	6,175 ft (1,882 m)		1,882 m										
Un-Named Peak	59.14.28	59°14′27″N 134°39′17″W	5,774 ft (1,760 m)		1,760 m										
Un-Named Peak	59.15.32	59°15′32″N 134°48′47″W	5,979 ft (1,822 m)		5,979 ft										
Un-Named Peak	59.19.15	59°19′15″N 134°38′42″W	6,227 ft (1,898 m)		1,898 m										East of Savage Glacier
Un-Named Peak	59.21.25	59°21′25″N 134°39′09″W	6,496 ft (1,980 m)		1,980 m										East of Savage Glacier
Un-Named Peak	59.25.5	59°25′05″N 134°35′30″W	5,971 ft (1,820 m)		1,820 m										North of Savage Glacier
Un-Named Peak	59.25.24	59°25′24″N 134°48′35″W	6,516 ft (1,986 m)		1,986 m										NW of Savage Glacier
Un-Named Peak	59.25.48	59°25′48″N 134°36′22″W	6,430 ft (1,960 m)		1,960 m										North of Savage Glacier
Un-Named Peak	59.25.54	59°25′54″N 134°37′41″W	6,490 ft (1,978 m)		1,978 m										North of Savage Glacier
Un-Named Peak	59.25.55	59°25′55″N 134°47′46″W	6,460 ft (1,969 m)		1,969 m										NW of Savage Glacier
Un-Named Peak	59.26.10	59°26′10″N 134°39′04″W	6,421 ft (1,957 m)		1,957 m										North of Savage Glacier
Un-Named Peak	59.29.25	59°29′25″N 135°00′09″W	6,516 ft (1,986 m)		1,986 m										

== Summits from 2000 m to 2050 m ==
The following table contains all peaks within the boundaries of the Juneau Icefield that have an elevation range of 2,000 m (6,562 ft) to 2,050 m (6,726 ft).

There are 47 peaks within this elevation range. There are 4 peaks that have been ascended. There are 7 named peaks. There are 40 peaks that have not been named.

Select summits from 2000 m to 2050 m
Name		Coordinates	Elevation	Elevation by Source			Official name		First ascent		Second ascent		PRM (Note: Peakbagger.com database)	CT (Note: CalTopo Mapping System)	Remarks
Official	Alt			GNIS	Topo	Other	GNIS	BCGN	Group	Date	Group	Date			Notes
Devils Paw E3		58°44′13″N 133°47′37″W	6,660 ft (2,030 m)		2,030 m				Lyon	2011					
Grizzly Peak		59°13′44″N 134°35′32″W	6,650 ft (2,027 m)		2,027 m			8091							
Horn Spire		58°42′57″N 134°37′14″W	6,700 ft (2,042 m)		6,700 ft		1422652		Lingle	1973			37760		
Mount Blachnitzky		58°47′48″N 134°23′46″W	6,644.98 ft (2,025.39 m)	6,348 ft	6,645 ft	6,645 ft	2105024		Charles Daellenbach, Keith Daellenbach, Scott McGee, Fred Skemp III (Note: "Archived copy" (PDF). Archived from the original (PDF) on April 2, 2015.)	June 30, 2004			32459		See Also: (Note: "Archived copy". Archived from the original on September 23, 2015.)
Princess Peak		58°33′35″N 134°22′39″W	6,585 ft (2,007 m)	6,152 ft	6,585 ft		14246757						43867		
Snowtop Mountain	BP-106	59°16′51″N 134°57′36″W	6,576 ft (2,004 m)		6,576 ft		1414831	38081					24454		
The Tusk		58°43′19″N 134°30′24″W	6,650 ft (2,027 m)		6,650 ft		1415266		Beckey	1972					
Un-Named Peaks
Un-Named Peak	58.14.34	59°14′34″N 134°32′33″W	6,657 ft (2,029 m)		2,029 m										
Un-Named Peak	58.45.59	58°45′59″N 134°14′27″W	6,600 ft (2,012 m)		6,600 ft										Spirit Range
Un-Named Peak	58.47.21	58°47′21″N 134°02′10″W	6,562 ft (2,000 m)		2,000 m										
Un-Named Peak	58.49.31	58°49′31″N 134°07′40″W	6,690 ft (2,040 m)		2,040 m										
Un-Named Peak	58.52.20	58°52′20″N 134°01′19″W	6,562 ft (2,000 m)		2,000 m										
Un-Named Peak	58.53.24	58°53′24″N 133°56′32″W	6,693 ft (2,040 m)		2,040 m										
Un-Named Peak	58.53.58	58°53′58″N 133°35′58″W	6,627 ft (2,020 m)		2,020 m										
Un-Named Peak	58.55.36	58°55′36″N 133°55′06″W	6,706 ft (2,044 m)		2,044 m										
Un-Named Peak	58.56.8	58°56′08″N 133°45′23″W	6,722 ft (2,049 m)		2,049 m										
Un-Named Peak	58.56.32	58°56′32″N 133°54′01″W	6,562 ft (2,000 m)		2,000 m										
Un-Named Peak	58.56.39	58°56′39″N 134°01′57″W	6,627 ft (2,020 m)		2,020 m										
Un-Named Peak	59.1.19	59°01′19″N 134°15′47″W	6,627 ft (2,020 m)		2,020 m										See Note: (Note: Peak is north of Savage Glacier)
Un-Named Peak	59.6.4	59°06′04″N 134°11′56″W	6,693 ft (2,040 m)		2,040 m										
Un-Named Peak	59.6.55	59°06′55″N 134°43′46″W	6,610 ft (2,015 m)		6,610 ft										
Un-Named Peak	59.8.16	59°08′16″N 134°17′55″W	6,673 ft (2,034 m)		2,034 m										
Un-Named Peak	59.9.25	59°09′25″N 134°36′35″W	6,644 ft (2,025 m)		2,025 m										
Un-Named Peak	59.10.42	59°10′42″N 134°30′40″W	6,581 ft (2,006 m)		2,006 m										
Un-Named Peak	59.11.14	59°11′14″N 134°27′04″W	6,693 ft (2,040 m)		2,040 m										
Un-Named Peak	59.11.26	59°11′26″N 134°27′47″W	6,693 ft (2,040 m)		2,040 m										
Un-Named Peak	59.11.43	59°11′43″N 134°28′02″W	6,693 ft (2,040 m)		2,040 m										
Un-Named Peak	59.12.27	59°12′27″N 134°32′21″W	6,677 ft (2,035 m)		2,035 m										
Un-Named Peak	59.13.40	59°13′40″N 134°29′26″W	6,562 ft (2,000 m)		2,000 m										
Un-Named Peak	59.14.53	59°14′53″N 134°28′28″W	6,693 ft (2,040 m)		2,040 m										
Un-Named Peak	59.15.6	59°15′06″N 134°34′44″W	6,680 ft (2,036 m)		2,036 m										See Note: (Note: Peak is east of Savage Glacier)
Un-Named Peak	59.15.38	59°15′38″N 134°35′13″W	6,562 ft (2,000 m)		2,000 m										
Un-Named Peak	59.15.49	59°15′49″N 134°23′45″W	6,693 ft (2,040 m)		2,040 m										
Un-Named Peak	59.16.23	59°16′23″N 134°36′00″W	6,627 ft (2,020 m)		2,020 m										See Note: (Note: Peak is west of Savage Glacier)
Un-Named Peak	59.16.51	59°16′51″N 134°13′58″W	6,611 ft (2,015 m)		2,015 m										
Un-Named Peak	59.17.7	59°17′07″N 134°47′44″W	6,693 ft (2,040 m)		2,040 m										
Un-Named Peak	59.17.58	59°17′58″N 134°07′14″W	6,706 ft (2,044 m)		2,044 m										
Un-Named Peak	59.23.59	59°23′59″N 134°45′13″W	6,706 ft (2,044 m)		2,044 m										
Un-Named Peak	59.24.6	59°24′06″N 134°43′00″W	6,565 ft (2,001 m)		2,001 m										
Un-Named Peak	59.25.37	59°25′37″N 134°59′10″W	6,562 ft (2,000 m)		1,901 m										
Un-Named Peak	59.26.34	59°26′34″N 134°27′26″W	6,693 ft (2,040 m)		2,040 m										
Un-Named Peak	59.28.3	59°28′03″N 134°45′46″W	6,631 ft (2,021 m)		2,021 m										
Un-Named Peak	59.29.40	59°29′40″N 134°57′28″W	6,690 ft (2,039 m)		2,039 m										
Un-Named Peak	59.29.45	59°29′45″N 135°05′23″W	6,600 ft (2,012 m)		6,600 ft										
Un-Named Peak	59.32.21	59°32′21″N 134°55′50″W	6,693 ft (2,040 m)		2,040 m										
Un-Named Peak	59.33.38	59°33′38″N 134°54′24″W	6,631 ft (2,021 m)		2,021 m										
Un-Named Peak	59.35.15	59°35′15″N 134°53′30″W	6,640 ft (2,024 m)		2,024 m										
Un-Named Peak	59.35.27	59°35′27″N 134°55′11″W	6,627 ft (2,020 m)		2,020 m										
Un-Named Peak	59.37.3	59°37′03″N 134°47′23″W	6,562 ft (2,000 m)		2,000 m	6,538 ft (Note: Cantopo has the elevation as 6,538ft)									
↑↑ Return to Juneau Icefield High Peaks Summary ↑↑

== Summits from 2050 m to 2100 m ==
The following table contains all peaks within the boundaries of the Juneau Icefield that have an elevation range of 2,050 m (6,726 ft) to 2,100 m (6,890 ft).

There are 50 peaks within this elevation range. There are 3 peaks that have been ascended.

There are 10 named peaks.

There are 40 peaks that have not been named.

Select summits from 2050 m to 2100 m
Name		Coordinates	Elevation	Elevation by Source			Official name		First ascent		Second ascent		PRM (Note: Topographic prominence Definition)	CT (Note: CalTopo Mapping System)	Remarks
Official	Alt			GNIS	Topo	Other	GNIS	BCGN	Group	Date	Group	Date			Notes
BP 108	BP-108	59°23′15″N 134°59′21″W	6,826 ft (2,081 m)	6,588 ft	6,826 ft		1420612						24455		
BP Monument 114	BPM-114	59°33′55″N 135°01′35″W	6,788 ft (2,069 m)		6,788 ft										See Note: (Note: The USGS Topographic maps label this peak as a Boundary Monument signifying that it has a Survey Marker placed, but it is also a peak of elevation 6,788ft with no identifiable First Ascent.)
East Tutshi		59°34′33″N 134°58′20″W	6,857 ft (2,090 m)		2,090 m										
Emperor Peak		58°35′00″N 134°22′56″W	6,805 ft (2,074 m)	6,680 ft	6,805 ft		1421741						43873		
Michaels Sword		58°43′34″N 133°52′31″W	6,759 ft (2,060 m)		2,027 m										
Mount Pullen	BP-104	59°11′33″N 134°40′43″W	6,816 ft (2,078 m)	6,966 ft	6,816 ft		1399384	25660	Nielsen	1968			24452		
Taiya Peak		59°41′13″N 135°11′00″W	6,844 ft (2,086 m)		2,086 m										
The Cathedral		59°19′40″N 134°07′22″W	6,824 ft (2,080 m)		2,080 m										
The Citadel		58°46′24″N 134°08′27″W	6,830 ft (2,082 m)	6,634 ft	6,830 ft		1415234		Miller	1968					
Un-Named Peaks
Un-Named Peak	58.41.22	58°41′22″N 133°49′20″W	6,840 ft (2,085 m)		6,840 ft										
Un-Named Peak	58.50.50	58°50′50″N 134°00′21″W	6,791 ft (2,070 m)		2,070 m										
Un-Named Peak	58.54.47	58°54′47″N 134°01′00″W	6,880 ft (2,097 m)		2,097 m										
Un-Named Peak	58.55.7	58°55′07″N 133°37′52″W	6,752 ft (2,058 m)		2,058 m										
Un-Named Peak	58.55.9	58°55′09″N 133°43′06″W	6,808 ft (2,075 m)		2,075 m										
Un-Named Peak	58.56.29	58°56′29″N 134°25′36″W	6,742 ft (2,055 m)		6,742 ft										
Un-Named Peak	58.57.8	58°57′08″N 133°54′35″W	6,726 ft (2,050 m)		2,050 m										
Un-Named Peak	58.59.23	58°59′23″N 133°45′33″W	6,824 ft (2,080 m)		2,080 m										
Un-Named Peak	58.57.25	58°57′25″N 134°01′48″W	6,798 ft (2,072 m)		2,072 m										
Un-Named Peak	59.3.45	59°03′45″N 134°20′51″W	6,726 ft (2,050 m)		2,050 m										
Un-Named Peak	59.5.2	59°05′02″N 134°23′19″W	6,824 ft (2,080 m)		2,080 m										See Note: (Note: Peak is north of Savage Glacier)
Un-Named Peak	59.5.23	59°05′23″N 134°38′24″W	6,785 ft (2,068 m)		6,785 ft										
Un-Named Peak	59.6.9	59°06′09″N 134°26′33″W	6,880 ft (2,097 m)		2,097 m										
Un-Named Peak	59.7.4	59°07′04″N 134°20′40″W	6,824 ft (2,080 m)		2,080 m										
Un-Named Peak	59.10.54	59°10′54″N 134°26′24″W	6,788 ft (2,069 m)		2,069 m										See Note: (Note: Peak is 2.9 mi NE of Mount Staecie)
Un-Named Peak	59.12.16	59°12′16″N 134°28′20″W	6,798 ft (2,072 m)		2,072 m										
Un-Named Peak	59.13.44	59°13′44″N 134°26′17″W	6,798 ft (2,072 m)		2,072 m										
Un-Named Peak	59.14.28	59°14′28″N 134°27′09″W	6,811 ft (2,076 m)		2,076 m										
Un-Named Peak	59.14.51	59°14′51″N 134°33′57″W	6,742 ft (2,055 m)		2,055 m										
Un-Named Peak	59.15.13	59°15′13″N 134°38′31″W	6,768 ft (2,063 m)		2,063 m										
Un-Named Peak	59.16.15	59°16′15″N 134°45′15″W	6,804 ft (2,074 m)		2,074 m										
Un-Named Peak	59.16.29	59°16′29″N 134°18′31″W	6,824 ft (2,080 m)		2,080 m										
Un-Named Peak	59.17.27	59°17′27″N 134°29′21″W	6,847 ft (2,087 m)		2,087 m										
Un-Named Peak	59.20.35	59°20′35″N 134°43′40″W	6,759 ft (2,060 m)		2,060 m										
Un-Named Peak	59.22.38	59°22′38″N 134°54′29″W	6,759 ft (2,060 m)		2,060 m										
Un-Named Peak	59.23.42	59°23′42″N 134°44′27″W	6,768 ft (2,063 m)		2,063 m										
Un-Named Peak	59.23.47	59°23′47″N 134°58′26″W	6,834 ft (2,083 m)		2,083 m										
Un-Named Peak	59.28.54	59°28′54″N 134°27′07″W	6,870 ft (2,094 m)		2,094 m										
Un-Named Peak	59.30.6	59°30′06″N 135°02′24″W	6,886 ft (2,099 m)		2,099 m										
Un-Named Peak	59.33.37	59°33′37″N 135°15′42″W	6,808 ft (2,075 m)		2,075 m										
Un-Named Peak	59.35.45	59°35′45″N 134°54′21″W	6,759 ft (2,060 m)		2,060 m										
↑↑ Return to Juneau Icefield High Peaks Summary ↑↑

== Summits from 2100 m to 2150 m ==
The following table contains all peaks within the boundaries of the Juneau Icefield that have an elevation range of 2,100 m (6,890 ft) to 2,150 m (7,054 ft).

There are 53 peaks within this elevation range.

There has been 4 peaks that have been ascended.

There are 5 named peaks. There are 48 peaks that have not been named.

Select summits from 2100 m to 2150 m
Name		Coordinates	Elevation	Elevation by Source			Official name		First ascent		Second ascent		PRM (Note: Peakbagger.com database)	CT (Note: CalTopo Mapping System)	Remarks
Official	Alt			GNIS	Topo	Other	GNIS	BCGN	Group	Date	Group	Date			Notes
BP 109	BP-109	59°25′38″N 135°06′01″W	6,930 ft (2,112 m)		6,722 ft	6,930 ft	1420613		Carpenter	1967			24456		See Note: (Note: Peakbagger.com refers to this peak as Mount Persephone)
	SE4	59°23′43″N 135°04′12″W	6,900 ft (2,103 m)		6,900 ft				Carpenter	1967					
Mendenhall Towers		58°32′04″N 134°29′42″W	6,910 ft (2,106 m)	5,026 ft	6,910 ft		1423648						37763		
Mount Canning	BP-105	59°15′00″N 134°41′41″W	6,967 ft (2,124 m)	6,676 ft	6,967 ft	6,967 ft	1399385	38518	Leland	1907	Nielsen	1968	24453		
Mount Hefty	BP-110	59°27′07″N 135°04′35″W	7,047 ft (2,148 m)	6,775 ft	7,047 ft		1422510	13303					24457		
	S3	59°25′37″N 135°04′10″W	7,008 ft (2,136 m)		2,136 m				Carpenter						
	S4	59°25′10″N 135°03′01″W	6,627 ft (2,020 m)		2,020 m										
The Snow Towers		58°37′43″N 134°30′58″W	7,005 ft (2,135 m)	6,663 ft	7,005 ft		1415262						43951		
Un-Named Peaks
Un-Named Peak	58.41.2	58°41′02″N 133°48′30″W	6,960 ft (2,121 m)		6,960 ft										
Un-Named Peak	58.52.31	58°52′31″N 134°03′32″W	7,018 ft (2,139 m)		2,139 m										
Un-Named Peak	58.53.29	58°53′29″N 134°10′17″W	6,949 ft (2,118 m)		2,118 m										
Un-Named Peak	58.54.13	58°54′13″N 133°59′39″W	7,021 ft (2,140 m)		2,140 m										
Un-Named Peak	58.54.36	58°54′36″N 133°40′43″W	6,939 ft (2,115 m)		2,115 m										
Un-Named Peak	58.55.45	58°55′45″N 133°43′16″W	7,021 ft (2,140 m)		2,140 m										
Un-Named Peak	58.58.1	58°58′01″N 134°01′50″W	6,893 ft (2,101 m)		2,101 m										
Un-Named Peak	59.0.58	59°00′58″N 134°15′58″W	7,021 ft (2,140 m)		2,140 m										
Un-Named Peak	59.3.12	59°03′12″N 134°25′37″W	6,980 ft (2,128 m)		6,980 ft										
Un-Named Peak	59.3.27	59°03′27″N 134°09′12″W	6,955 ft (2,120 m)		2,120 m										
Un-Named Peak	59.3.50	59°03′50″N 134°28′32″W	6,955 ft (2,120 m)		6,955 ft										
Un-Named Peak	59.5.52	59°05′52″N 134°16′40″W	7,028 ft (2,142 m)		2,142 m										
Un-Named Peak	59.6.2	59°06′02″N 134°19′29″W	6,955 ft (2,120 m)		2,120 m										
Un-Named Peak	59.7.10	59°07′10″N 134°46′00″W	6,900 ft (2,103 m)		6,900 ft										
Un-Named Peak	59.7.18	59°07′18″N 134°31′56″W	6,970 ft (2,124 m)		6,970 ft										
Un-Named Peak	59.7.23	59°07′23″N 134°19′48″W	6,955 ft (2,120 m)		2,120 m										
Un-Named Peak	59.9.23	59°9′23″N 134°45′19″W	6,952 ft (2,119 m)		6,952 ft										
Un-Named Peak	59.9.35	59°9′35″N 134°35′17″W	6,913 ft (2,107 m)		2,107 m										
Un-Named Peak	59.12.8	59°12′08″N 134°23′51″W	6,988 ft (2,130 m)		2,130 m										
Un-Named Peak	59.12.57	59°12′57″N 134°10′56″W	6,955 ft (2,120 m)		2,120 m										
Un-Named Peak	59.14.3	59°14′03″N 134°46′12″W	6,900 ft (2,103 m)		6,900 ft										
Un-Named Peak	59.14.59	59°14′59″N 134°21′19″W	6,995 ft (2,132 m)		2,132 m										
Un-Named Peak	59.15.8	59°15′08″N 134°20′05″W	6,929 ft (2,112 m)		2,112 m										
Un-Named Peak	59.16.37	59°16′37″N 134°19′28″W	6,955 ft (2,120 m)		2,120 m										
Un-Named Peak	59.16.42	59°16′42″N 134°43′04″W	6,913 ft (2,107 m)		2,107 m										
Un-Named Peak	59.16.43	59°16′43″N 134°36′26″W	6,955 ft (2,120 m)		2,120 m										
Un-Named Peak	59.18.57	59°18′57″N 134°31′29″W	7,037 ft (2,145 m)		2,145 m										
Un-Named Peak	59.19.27	59°19′27″N 134°44′24″W	7,041 ft (2,146 m)		2,146 m										
Un-Named Peak	59.19.28	59°19′28″N 134°30′49″W	6,955 ft (2,120 m)		2,120 m										
Un-Named Peak	59.20.50	59°20′50″N 134°33′7″W	6,955 ft (2,120 m)		2,120 m										
Un-Named Peak	59.20.59	59°20′59″N 134°53′59″W	6,991 ft (2,131 m)		2,131 m										
Un-Named Peak	59.21.21	59°21′21″N 134°33′55″W	6,972 ft (2,125 m)		2,125 m										
Un-Named Peak	59.24.46	59°24′46″N 134°46′34″W	6,949 ft (2,118 m)		2,118 m										
Un-Named Peak	59.25.39	59°25′39″N 134°55′47″W	6,890 ft (2,100 m)		2,100 m										
Un-Named Peak	59.26.44	59°26′44″N 134°24′19″W	6,955 ft (2,120 m)		2,120 m										
Un-Named Peak	59.27.40	59°27′40″N 134°52′55″W	6,985 ft (2,129 m)		2,129 m										
Un-Named Peak	59.28.3	59°28′03″N 134°27′15″W	6,952 ft (2,119 m)		2,119 m										
Un-Named Peak	59.28.12	59°28′12″N 134°52′37″W	6,955 ft (2,120 m)		2,120 m										
Un-Named Peak	59.29.40	59°29′40″N 134°57′28″W	6,965 ft (2,123 m)		2,123 m										
Un-Named Peak	59.31.8	59°31′08″N 135°08′38″W	6,985 ft (2,129 m)		2,129 m										
Un-Named Peak	59.36.51	59°36′51″N 134°57′17″W	7,014 ft (2,138 m)		2,138 m										
Warm Pass		59°32′28″N 134°56′46″W	6,932 ft (2,113 m)		2,113 m										
White Pass		59°39′10″N 135°00′52″W	6,913 ft (2,107 m)		2,107 m			21146							
Young Peak		59°36′38″N 134°51′57″W	7,011 ft (2,137 m)		2,137 m			27366							
↑↑ Return to Juneau Icefield High Peaks Summary ↑↑

== Summits from 2150 m to 2200 m ==
The following table contains all summits/peaks within the boundaries of the Juneau Icefield that have an elevation range of 2,150 m (7,054 ft) to 2,200 m (7,218 ft).

There are 35 summits/peaks within this elevation range. Four peaks have been ascended.

There are 5 officially named peaks.

There is 1 unofficially named peak. There are 30 peaks that have not been named.

Select summits from 2150 m to 2200 m
Name		Coordinates	Elevation	Elevation by Source			Official name		First ascent		Second ascent		PRM (Note: Peakbagger.com database)	CT (Note: CalTopo Mapping System)	Remarks
Official	Alt			GNIS	Topo	Other	GNIS	BCGN	Group	Date	Group	Date			Notes
Gorgon Spire		58°48′05″N 134°15′37″W	7,057.2 ft (2,151 m)		~7,000 ft		2804969		William Loken, Alfred Pinchak, Harte Bressler, Bruce Haley	July 4, 1969	JIRP	July 2018			See Note: (Note: The elevation of Gorgon Spire was surveyed by the Juneau Icefield Research Program on July 29, 2018 using survey-grade GPS, with the summit GPS data being differentially-corrected using the N1 benchmark at JIRP's Camp 18.)
Mount Bagot	BP-107	59°20′47″N 135°01′48″W	7,155 ft (2,181 m)	6,788 ft	7,155 ft		1420186	12635	Carpenter	1967			47039		See Note: (Note: Peakbagger.com refers to this as Mount Bagot SW Peak.)
	NE	59°20′55″N 135°01′26″W	7,087 ft (2,160 m)		2,160 m								24399		See Note: (Note: Peakbagger.com refers to this as Mount Bagot, but the USGS does not recognize this as Mount Bagot as it is in Canada and not the Boundary Peak.)
Mount Hislop	BP-103	59°07′52″N 134°33′55″W	7,164 ft (2,184 m)	6,811 ft	7,164 ft	7,164 ft	1399383	19257	Nielsen	1968			24451		
Mount Steacie		59°09′17″N 134°30′13″W	7,208 ft (2,197 m)		2,197 m			14133	Nielsen	1968					
	SP-59.9.11	59°09′11″N 134°28′24″W	6,562 ft (2,000 m)		2,000 m										
	SP-59.9.20	59°09′20″N 134°28′03″W	6,299 ft (1,920 m)		1,920 m										
Unofficially Named Peaks
Nunatak Peak		59°03′33″N 134°09′55″W	7,139 ft (2,176 m)		2,176 m								??		See Note: (Note: Not an official name, as it is not listed in BCGN.)
Un-Named Peaks
Un-Named Peak	58.48.8	58°48′08″N 134°15′31″W	7,100 ft (2,164 m)		7,100 ft										
Un-Named Peak	58.50.58	58°50′58″N 134°16′07″W	7,210 ft (2,198 m)		7,210 ft	2,198 m									
Un-Named Peak	58.54.57	58°54′57″N 133°39′50″W	7,152 ft (2,180 m)		2,180 m										
Un-Named Peak	58.55.14	58°55′14″N 133°58′47″W	7,054 ft (2,150 m)		2,150 m										
Un-Named Peak	58.55.30	58°55′30″N 134°00′46″W	7,172 ft (2,186 m)		2,186 m										
Un-Named Peak	58.56.28	58°56′28″N 134°24′11″W	7,134 ft (2,174 m)		7,134 ft										
Un-Named Peak	58.57.6	58°57′06″N 134°01′26″W	7,152 ft (2,180 m)		2,180 m										
Un-Named Peak	58.58.43	58°58′43″N 133°46′25″W	7,162 ft (2,183 m)		2,183 m										
Un-Named Peak	58.59.34	58°59′34″N 133°43′08″W	7,077 ft (2,157 m)		2,157 m										
Un-Named Peak	59.1.18	59°01′18″N 134°30′55″W	7,160 ft (2,182 m)		7,160 ft										
Un-Named Peak	59.6.1	59°06′01″N 134°48′26″W	7,200 ft (2,195 m)		7,200 ft										
	SP-59.6.1	59°06′01″N 134°13′07″W	6,955 ft (2,120 m)		2,120 m										
Un-Named Peak	59.6.4	59°06′04″N 134°12′31″W	7,195 ft (2,193 m)		2,193 m										
	SP-59.6.40	59°06′40″N 134°12′40″W	6,824 ft (2,080 m)		2,080 m										
	SP-59.6.54	59°06′54″N 134°12′36″W	7,057 ft (2,151 m)		2,151 m										
	SP-59.7.15	59°07′15″N 134°11′36″W	6,693 ft (2,040 m)		2,040 m										
	SP-59.7.29	59°07′29″N 134°10′40″W	6,693 ft (2,040 m)		2,040 m										
Un-Named Peak	59.6.53	59°06′53″N 134°33′31″W	7,085 ft (2,160 m)		7,085 ft										
Un-Named Peak	59.14.18	59°14′18″N 134°24′17″W	7,149 ft (2,179 m)		2,179 m										
Un-Named Peak	59.19.40	59°19′40″N 134°25′51″W	7,110 ft (2,167 m)		2,167 m										
Un-Named Peak	59.20.30	59°20′30″N 134°22′41″W	7,133 ft (2,174 m)		2,174 m										
Un-Named Peak	59.27.38	59°27′38″N 134°31′16″W	7,093 ft (2,162 m)		2,162 m										
Un-Named Peak	59.31.12	59°31′12″N 134°36′40″W	7,200 ft (2,195 m)		7,200 ft										
Un-Named Peak	59.31.22	59°31′22″N 134°33′16″W	7,100 ft (2,164 m)		7,100 ft										
Un-Named Peak	59.32.49	59°32′49″N 134°37′00″W	7,087 ft (2,160 m)		2,160 m										
Un-Named Peak	59.34.14	59°34′14″N 134°37′09″W	7,152 ft (2,180 m)		7,100 ft										
Un-Named Peak	59.38.52	59°38′52″N 134°54′58″W	7,208 ft (2,197 m)		2,197 m										
↑↑ Return to Juneau Icefield High Peaks Summary ↑↑

== Summits from 2200 m to 2250 m ==
The following table contains all peaks/summits within the boundaries of the Juneau Icefield that have an elevation range of 2,200 m (7,218 ft) to 2,250 m (7,382 ft).

There are 28 peaks within this elevation range. Two peaks have been ascended. There are 5 officially named peaks and 2 unofficially named peaks. There are 21 peaks that have not been named.

Select summits from 2200 m to 2250 m
Name		Coordinates	Elevation	Elevation by Source			Official name		First ascent		Second ascent		PRM (Note: Peakbagger.com database)	CT (Note: CalTopo Mapping System)	Remarks
Official	Alt			GNIS	Topo	Other	GNIS	BCGN	Group	Date	Group	Date			Notes
Bicorn Peak		59°05′18″N 134°24′35″W	7,218 ft (2,200 m)		2,200 m			7963	Nielsen	1968	Nielsen	1968			
Elephant Promontory		58°48′59″N 134°07′22″W	7,320 ft (2,231 m)	6,847 ft	7,320 ft		1421697								
Mount Brackett		59°06′57″N 134°47′45″W	7,300 ft (2,225 m)	7,031 ft	7,300 ft		1416743						43946		See Note: (Note: Mount Brackett does not show on USGS Topo maps. Coordinates from GNIS.)
Mount Lawson		59°32′06″N 134°33′02″W	7,283 ft (2,220 m)		2,220 m			13125							
Paradise Peak		59°06′13″N 133°31′26″W	7,218 ft (2,200 m)		2,200 m			19427					51487		
Unofficially Named Peaks
Buchan		59°26′17″N 134°26′52″W	7,224 ft (2,202 m)	2,120 m	2,202 m										
Willison Peak	59.9.50	59°09′51″N 134°19′43″W	7,280 ft (2,219 m)		2,219 m										
	SP-59.7.54	59°07′54″N 134°20′11″W	6,946 ft (2,117 m)		2,117 m										
	SP-59.8.12	59°08′12″N 134°21′06″W	6,926 ft (2,111 m)		2,111 m										
	SP-59.8.35	59°08′35″N 134°20′42″W	6,860 ft (2,091 m)		2,091 m										
	SP-59.8.57	59°08′57″N 134°20′08″W	7,011 ft (2,137 m)		2,137 m										
	SP-59.9.19	59°09′19″N 134°20′38″W	6,565 ft (2,001 m)		2,001 m										
	SP-59.9.41	59°09′41″N 134°20′27″W	6,821 ft (2,079 m)		2,079 m										
	SP-59.10.9	59°10′09″N 134°19′51″W	6,841 ft (2,085 m)		2,085 m										
	SP-59.10.28	59°10′28″N 134°19′29″W	6,693 ft (2,040 m)		2,040 m										
Un-Named Peaks
Un-Named Peak	58.55.1	58°55′01″N 133°39′12″W	7,241 ft (2,207 m)		2,207 m										
Un-Named Peak	58.55.55	58°55′55″N 134°01′22″W	7,349 ft (2,240 m)		2,240 m										
Un-Named Peak	58.58.21	58°58′21″N 134°00′48″W	7,297 ft (2,224 m)		2,224 m										
Un-Named Peak	58.59.44	58°59′44″N 133°45′27″W	7,352 ft (2,241 m)		2,241 m										
Un-Named Peak	59.5.55	59°05′55″N 134°46′53″W	7,255 ft (2,211 m)		7,255 ft										
Un-Named Peak	59.6.21	59°06′21″N 134°18′14″W	7,218 ft (2,200 m)		2,200 m										See Note: (Note: Peak is east of Willison Glacier Neve Area)
Un-Named Peak	59.6.44	59°06′44″N 134°19′51″W	7,287 ft (2,221 m)		2,221 m										
Un-Named Peak	59.9.25	59°09′25″N 134°48′58″W	7,305 ft (2,227 m)		7,305 ft										
Un-Named Peak	59.10.53	59°10′53″N 134°48′48″W	7,236 ft (2,206 m)		7,236 ft										
Un-Named Peak	59.15.4	59°15′04″N 134°23′50″W	7,329 ft (2,234 m)		2,234 m										
Un-Named Peak	59.17.44	59°17′44″N 134°37′29″W	7,280 ft (2,219 m)		2,219 m										See Note: (Note: Peak is 4.2 mi NE of Mount Canning)
Un-Named Peak	59.19.12	59°19′12″N 134°16′51″W	7,218 ft (2,200 m)		2,200 m										
Un-Named Peak	59.19.54	59°19′54″N 134°20′20″W	7,349 ft (2,240 m)		2,240 m										
Un-Named Peak	59.23.37	59°23′37″N 134°57′01″W	7,290 ft (2,222 m)		2,222 m										See Note: (Note: Peak is 1.5 m east-northeast of BP 108)
Un-Named Peak	59.24.11	59°24′11″N 134°56′44″W	7,306 ft (2,227 m)		2,227 m								682 m (Note: "Archived copy". Archived from the original on March 21, 2016./MtnPg.asp?MtnId=10460)		See Note: (Note: Referred to as Denver Peak on Bivouac.com)
Un-Named Peak	59.30.10	59°30′10″N 135°06′19″W	7,375 ft (2,248 m)		2,248 m										
↑↑ Return to Juneau Icefield High Peaks Summary ↑↑

== Summits from 2250 m to 2300 m ==
The following table contains all peaks within the boundaries of the Juneau Icefield that have an elevation range of 2,250 m (7,382 ft) to 2,300 m (7,546 ft).

There are 19 peaks within this elevation range.

There has been 1 peak that has been ascended.

There are 11 named peaks.

There are 8 peaks that have not been named.

Select summits from 2250 m to 2300 m
Name		Coordinates	Elevation	Elevation by Source			Official name		First ascent		Second ascent		PRM (Note: Peakbagger.com database)	CT (Note: CalTopo Mapping System)	Remarks
Official	Alt			GNIS	Topo	Other	GNIS	BCGN	Group	Date	Group	Date			Notes
Blizzard Peak		58°50′39″N 134°13′25″W	7,400 ft (2,256 m)	7,106 ft	7,400 ft		1420526								
BP 96	BP-096	58°54′06″N 134°18′29″W	7,406 ft (2,257 m)	7,287 ft	7,406 ft		1420645						24445		
	SP-58.54.24	58°54′24″N 134°17′53″W	7,349 ft (2,240 m)		2,240 m								40 m		
BP 99	BP-099	58°58′46″N 134°24′24″W	7,406 ft (2,257 m)	7,290 ft	7,406 ft		1420610						24447		
	SP-58.59.15	58°59′15″N 134°25′50″W	7,174 ft (2,187 m)		7,174 ft										
Gale Peak		58°51′03″N 134°14′01″W	7,425 ft (2,263 m)	6,877 ft	7,425 ft		1422084								
Gisel Peak	BP-094	58°46′02″N 133°58′11″W	7,484 ft (2,281 m)	7,116 ft	2,281 m		1422163						52147		
	SW2	58°46′40″N 133°59′51″W	7,480 ft (2,280 m)		2,280 m										
Hang Ten Peak	SE3	58°52′54″N 133°38′18″W	7,470 ft (2,277 m)		2,277 m										
Mount Caplice		59°10′41″N 134°14′43″W	7,031 ft (2,143 m)		2,143 m			12692							
	E	59°11′12″N 134°11′23″W	7,474 ft (2,278 m)		2,278 m										
	N	59°11′16″N 134°13′42″W	7,047 ft (2,148 m)		7,047 ft										
	NE1	59°11′53″N 134°11′40″W	7,333 ft (2,235 m)		7,333 ft										
	NE2	59°12′49″N 134°11′42″W	7,336 ft (2,236 m)		2,236 m										
	S	59°10′04″N 134°14′22″W	7,277 ft (2,218 m)		2,218 m										
	SE	59°10′30″N 134°11′40″W	7,188 ft (2,191 m)		7,188 ft										
	SP-59.8.40	59°08′40″N 134°15′18″W	6,824 ft (2,080 m)		2,080 m										
	SP-59.9.4	59°09′04″N 134°13′32″W	6,824 ft (2,080 m)		2,080 m										
	SP-59.9.16	59°09′16″N 134°14′30″W	7,165 ft (2,184 m)		2,184 m										
	SP-59.10.56	59°10′56″N 134°15′25″W	6,824 ft (2,080 m)		2,080 m										
	SP-59.11.2	59°11′03″N 134°12′23″W	7,090 ft (2,161 m)		7,090 ft										
	SP-59.11.21	59°11′21″N 134°14′14″W	6,693 ft (2,040 m)		2,040 m										
	SP-59.11.49	59°11′49″N 134°14′04″W	6,939 ft (2,115 m)		2,115 m										
	SP-59.12.10	59°12′10″N 134°10′05″W	6,824 ft (2,080 m)		2,080 m										
	SP-59.12.5	59°12′05″N 134°13′55″W	6,562 ft (2,000 m)		2,000 m										
	SP-59.12.27	59°12′27″N 134°14′14″W	6,693 ft (2,040 m)		2,040 m										
	SP-59.13.29	59°13′29″N 134°11′51″W	6,693 ft (2,040 m)		2,040 m										
	SP-59.13.32	59°13′32″N 134°10′42″W	6,693 ft (2,040 m)		2,040 m										
Mount Moore		58°48′26″N 134°07′52″W	7,410 ft (2,259 m)	7,027 ft	7,410 ft		1423770		JIRP (Note: The Juneau Icefield Research Program has studied this area continuously since 1949. During that period many peaks were climbed, but records were not kept, nor published. The citation of this climb is that a permanent research station exists on Mount Moore.)	Bef 1960					
Papaya Nunatak		58°57′29″N 133°57′31″W	7,464 ft (2,275 m)		2,275 m			40772							
Sawtooth Range		59°30′21″N 135°07′20″W	7,477 ft (2,279 m)	6,840 ft	2,279 m		1416663								
Typhoon Peak		58°50′49″N 134°13′42″W	7,520 ft (2,292 m)	7,221 ft	7,520 ft		1415490								
Un-Named Peaks
Un-Named Peak	58.48.25	58°48′25″N 133°53′03″W	7,405 ft (2,257 m)		2,257 m										
Un-Named Peak	58.54.26	58°54′26″N 134°23′07″W	7,400 ft (2,256 m)		7,400 ft										
	SP-58.54.18	58°54′18″N 134°24′30″W	7,244 ft (2,208 m)		7,244 ft										
	SP-58.54.53	58°54′53″N 134°23′41″W	7,100 ft (2,164 m)		7,100 ft										
	SP-58.55.28	58°55′28″N 134°23′25″W	7,080 ft (2,158 m)		7,080 ft										
Un-Named Peak	59.0.45	59°00′45″N 134°01′15″W	7,497 ft (2,285 m)		2,285 m										
	SP-59.0.16	59°00′16″N 134°01′16″W	7,349 ft (2,240 m)		2,240 m										
	SP-59.0.53	59°00′53″N 133°59′22″W	7,339 ft (2,237 m)		2,237 m										
Un-Named Peak	59.18.3A	59°18′03″N 134°44′51″W	7,418 ft (2,261 m)		2,261 m								673 m (Note: "Archived copy". Archived from the original on March 21, 2016./MtnPg.asp?MtnId=10480)		See Note: (Note: Peak is 4.0 mi N-NW of Mount Canning) (Note: referred to as Nobel Peak on Bivouac.com)
Un-Named Peak	59.18.3B	59°18′03″N 134°26′10″W	7,418 ft (2,261 m)		2,261 m										
↑↑ Return to Juneau Icefield High Peaks Summary ↑↑

== Summits from 2300 m to 2400 m ==
The following table contains all summits/peaks within the boundaries of the Juneau Icefield that have an elevation range of 2,300 m (7,546 ft) to 2,400 m (7,874 ft).

There are 17 peaks within this elevation range. Five peaks have been ascended.

There are 9 officially named peaks. There are 0 unofficially named peaks.

There are 8 Peaks that have not been named.

Select summits from 2300 m to 2400 m
Name		Coordinates	Elevation	Elevation by Source			Official name		First ascent		Second ascent		PRM (Note: Peakbagger.com database)	CT (Note: CalTopo Mapping System)	Remarks
Official	Alt			GNIS	Topo	Other	GNIS	BCGN	Group	Date	Group	Date			
Hang Ten Peak		58°53′48″N 133°40′48″W	7,726 ft (2,355 m)		2,355 m			41129							
Mount Bressler	BP-097	58°55′25″N 134°20′12″W	7,856 ft (2,395 m)	7,782 ft	7,856 ft		1420609	12658	Miller	1962	Miller	1968	24446		
	UNP-58.56.16	58°56′16″N 133°37′04″W	6,755 ft (2,059 m)		2,059 m										
	SP-58.56.16	58°56′16″N 134°20′58″W	7,180 ft (2,188 m)		7,180 ft										
Mount Haney		58°56′18″N 133°43′02″W	7,569 ft (2,307 m)		2,307 m			13423							
Mount Leland		59°10′14″N 134°47′35″W	7,810 ft (2,380 m)	7,674 ft	7,810 ft		1405283						43945		
Mount London	BP-100	59°02′20″N 134°22′55″W	7,550 ft (2,301 m)	7,451 ft	7,550 ft		1399380	21180	Dittrich	2013			24448		
	S1	59°02′00″N 134°23′48″W	7,510 ft (2,289 m)		7,510 ft										
	NE1	59°2′50″N 134°21′56″W	7,349 ft (2,240 m)		2240 m										
	S4	59°00′23″N 134°24′24″W	7,230 ft (2,204 m)		7,230 ft										
Mount Ogilvie	BP-095	58°51′39″N 134°15′30″W	7,867 ft (2,398 m)	7,664 ft	2,398 m		1420600	19316					24444		
	N2	58°52′55″N 134°15′57″W	7,690 ft (2,344 m)		2,344 m										
	NE4	58°52′53″N 134°12′04″W	7,569 ft (2,307 m)		2,307 m				Lyon	2011					
Mount Poletica	BP-102	59°07′55″N 134°29′02″W	7,620 ft (2,323 m)	7,408 ft	7,620 ft		1399382	20305	Nielsen	1968	Nielsen	1968	24450		
Mount Service	BP-101	59°05′21″N 134°26′48″W	7,847 ft (2,392 m)	7,611 ft	7,847 ft		1399381	20240	Nielsen	1968	Dittrich	2013	24449		
Mount Switzer		59°20′21″N 134°17′58″W	7,657 ft (2,334 m)		2,334 m			19375							
Unofficially Named Peaks
Mount Queena		58°51′47″N 134°20′25″W	7,620 ft (2,323 m)		7,620 ft										See Note: (Note: Referred to as Mount Queena on PeakBagger)
	SP-58.51.30	58°51′30″N 134°21′42″W	7,606 ft (2,318 m)		7,606 ft										
	SP-58.51.35	58°51′35″N 134°21′37″W	7,606 ft (2,318 m)		7,606 ft										
	SP-58.52.35	58°52′35″N 134°23′17″W	7,392 ft (2,253 m)		7,392 ft	2,253 m									See Note: (Note: There is a major discrepancy as to the elevation of this peak as Google Maps reports an elevation of about 6,200 ft, while USGS and USFS Maps report 7,392 ft as the elevation of the peak.)
	SP-58.52.47	58°52′47″N 134°21′12″W	7,370 ft (2,246 m)		7,370 ft										
	SP-58.52.59	58°52′59″N 134°21′30″W	6,800 ft (2,073 m)		6,800 ft	2,073 m									
Un-Named Peaks
Un-Named Peak	58.48.33	58°48′33″N 133°55′27″W	7,615 ft (2,321 m)		2,321 m										
Un-Named Peak	58.51.52	58°51′52″N 134°02′57″W	7,595 ft (2,315 m)		2,315 m										
Un-Named Peak	58.53.37	58°53′37″N 133°40′22″W	7,677 ft (2,340 m)		2,34										
Un-Named Peak	58.56.57	58°56′27″N 134°09′49″W	7,766 ft (2,367 m)		2,367 m										
	SP-58.55.24	58°55′24″N 134°11′24″W	6,693 ft (2,040 m)		2,040 m										
	SP-58.56.10	58°56′10″N 134°11′36″W	7,087 ft (2,160 m)		2,160 m										
	SP-58.56.18	58°56′18″N 134°8′15″W	7,382 ft (2,250 m)		2,250 m										
Un-Named Peak	58.56.28	58°56′28″N 134°11′39″W	7,087 ft (2,160 m)		2,160 m										
	SP-58.58.12	58°58′12″N 134°10′58″W	7,533 ft (2,296 m)		2,296 m										
	SP-58.59.35	58°59′35″N 134°09′20″W	6,562 ft (2,000 m)		2,000 m										
Un-Named Peak	59.4.51	59°04′51″N 134°25′25″W	7,608 ft (2,319 m)		2,319 m										
↑↑ Return to Juneau Icefield High Peaks Summary ↑↑

== Summits above 2400 m ==
The following table contains all peaks/summits within the boundaries of the Juneau Icefield that have an elevation range of 2,400 m (7,874 ft) or greater.

There are 3 peaks within this elevation range. There are 3 named peaks. There are 0 peaks that have not been named.

Select summits above 2400 m
Name		Coordinates	Elevation	Elevation by Source			Official name		PRM (Note: Peakbagger.com database)	CT (Note: CalTopo Mapping System)	Remarks
Official	Alt			GNIS	Topo	Other	GNIS	BCGN			Notes
Devils Paw	BP-093	58°43′46″N 133°50′17″W	8,584 ft (2,616 m)	8,041 ft	8,584 ft		1420644		782		
Mount Nesselrode	BP-098	58°57′45″N 134°18′48″W	8,105 ft (2,470 m)	7,995 ft	8,105 ft	8,100 ft	1420646	19287	781		
	E3	58°58′11″N 134°16′17″W	7,448 ft (2,270 m)		2,270 m						
	NE3	58°58′11″N 134°16′17″W	7,415 ft (2,260 m)		2,260 m						
	NE5	58°59′46″N 134°16′14″W	7,349 ft (2,240 m)		2,240 m						
Nelles Peak		58°48′15″N 133°54′53″W	8,304 ft (2,531 m)		2,531 m			19282	51570		
	58.47.48	58°47′48″N 133°56′6″W	7,913 ft (2,412 m)		2,412 m						
↑↑ Return to Juneau Icefield High Peaks Summary ↑↑

== Summit topographic prominence ==
The Mountaineering definition of a peak in the United States has an informal threshold of 2,000 ft (610 m) of prominence that signifies that a peak has major stature, therefore some peaks reported in this article may not satisfy the requirements for determining a First Ascent. The Clean Prominence, Optimistic Prominence and Isolation should be verified for a First Ascent attempt. The following table contains all peaks/summits within the boundaries of the Juneau Icefield whose prominence has been determined. The values for Key Col elevation, Isolation distance, Isolation Location and peak prominence were obtained from Peakbagger.com

Summit Topographic Prominence
Name		Coordinates	Elevation		Isolation		PRM	Remarks
Official	PB Code		Summit	Key Col	Distance(NHN)	Location		Notes
Antler Peak	?	58°43′46″N 133°50′17″W	0 ft (0 m)	0 ft (0 m)			0 ft (0 m)	
BP 96	24445		7,406 ft (2,257 m)	6,726 ft (2,050 m)	2.23 mi	Mount Bressler	2,336 ft (712 m)	Boundary Peak
BP 99	24447		7,406 ft (2,257 m)	21,634 ft (6,594 m)	4.93 mi	Mount Nesselrode	0 ft (0 m)	
BP 108	24455		6,826 ft (2,081 m)	0 ft (0 m)			0 ft (0 m)	
BP 109	24456		6,930 ft (2,112 m)	0 ft (0 m)			0 ft (0 m)	
Devils Paw	782	58°43′46″N 133°50′17″W	8,584 ft (2,616 m)	0 ft (0 m)			0 ft (0 m)	
Emperor Peak	43873		6,805 ft (2,074 m)	0 ft (0 m)			0 ft (0 m)	
Gisel Peak	52147		0 ft (0 m)	0 ft (0 m)			0 ft (0 m)	
Hodgkins Peak	43950		5,800 ft (1,768 m)	3,701 ft (1,128 m)	10.81 km	Antler Peak	2,100 ft (640 m)	
Horn Spire	37760		6,700 ft (2,042 m)	3,701 ft (1,128 m)	10.81 km	Antler Peak	1,401 ft (427 m)	
Mendenhall Towers	37763		6,910 ft (2,106 m)	0 ft (0 m)			0 ft (0 m)	
Mount Bagot	47039		7,155 ft (2,181 m)	0 ft (0 m)			0 ft (0 m)	
Mount Blachnitzky	32459		6,645 ft (2,025 m)	3,701 ft (1,128 m)	10.81 km	Antler Peak	600 ft (183 m)	
Mount Brackett	43946		7,300 ft (2,225 m)	0 ft (0 m)			0 ft (0 m)	
Mount Bressler	24446		7,856 ft (2,395 m)	0 ft (0 m)			0 ft (0 m)	
Mount Canning	24453		6,987 ft (2,130 m)	0 ft (0 m)			0 ft (0 m)	
Mount Caplice	?		0 ft (0 m)	0 ft (0 m)			0 ft (0 m)	
Mount Hefty	24457		7,047 ft (2,148 m)	0 ft (0 m)			0 ft (0 m)	
Mount Hislop			7,164 ft (2,184 m)	0 ft (0 m)			0 ft (0 m)	
Mount Leland	43945		7,810 ft (2,380 m)	15,748 ft (4,800 m)	21.71 km	Mount Service	3,010 ft (917 m)	
Mount Livingston	?		0 ft (0 m)	0 ft (0 m)			0 ft (0 m)	
Mount London	24448		7,550 ft (2,301 m)	0 ft (0 m)			0 ft (0 m)	
Mount Nesselrode	781	58°57′45″N 134°18′48″W	8,105 ft (2,470 m)	5,118 ft (1,560 m)	28.91 km	Nellis Peak	2,999 ft (914 m)	
Mount Ogilvie	24444		7,867 ft (2,398 m)	0 ft (0 m)			0 ft (0 m)	
Mount Poletica	24450		7,620 ft (2,323 m)	5,807 ft (1,770 m)	5.18 km	Mount Service	0 ft (0 m)	
Mount Pullen	24452		6,816 ft (2,078 m)	0 ft (0 m)			0 ft (0 m)	
Mount Service	24449		7,847 ft (2,392 m)	0 ft (0 m)			0 ft (0 m)	
Nelles Peak	51570		8,304 ft (2,531 m)	0 ft (0 m)			0 ft (0 m)	
Paradise Peak	51487		0 ft (0 m)	0 ft (0 m)			0 ft (0 m)	
Princess Peak	43867		6,585 ft (2,007 m)	0 ft (0 m)			0 ft (0 m)	
Rhino Peak	37782		5,914 ft (1,803 m)	3,701 ft (1,128 m)	10.81 km		2,100 ft (640 m)	
Snowtop Mountain	24454		7,005 ft (2,135 m)	0 ft (0 m)			0 ft (0 m)	
Snowtop Towers	43951		0 ft (0 m)	0 ft (0 m)			0 ft (0 m)	

== First ascents ==
The first ascent climbs for major peaks within the Juneau Icefield area .

First Ascents
Name		Coordinates	Elevation	First ascent		Second ascent		Remarks
Official	Alt			Group	Date	Group	Date	Notes
Devils Paw	BP-093	58°43′46″N 133°50′17″W	8,584 ft (2,616 m)	Beckey (Note: "Archived copy" (PDF). Archived from the original (PDF) on April 2, 2015.)	1950			
Mount Nesselrode	BP-098	58°57′45″N 134°18′48″W	8,105 ft (2,470 m)	Miller	1972			
Nelles Peak		58°48′15″N 133°54′53″W	8,304 ft (2,531 m)					
Mount Ogilvie	NE4	58°52′53″N 134°12′04″W	7,569 ft (2,307 m)	Lyon	2011			
Mount Poletica	BP-102	59°07′55″N 134°29′02″W	7,620 ft (2,323 m)	Nielsen	1968	Nielsen	1968	
Mount Service	BP-101	59°05′21″N 134°26′48″W	7,847 ft (2,392 m)	Nielsen	1968	Dittrich	2013	
↑↑ Return to Juneau Icefield High Peaks Summary ↑↑

== International Boundary Line peaks and monuments ==
These peaks and monuments (survey markers) were designated as part of the Alaska Boundary Settlement of 1903 and associated later surveys. Elephant Promontory is not an official Boundary Peak even though it lies on the International Boundary Line. It was added to assist in delineating the boundary. The peaks in the table below are those that are adjacent to the Juneau Icefield.

Boundary Peak		Coordinates		Boundary Peak		Coordinates		Boundary Peak		Coordinates	Remarks
Number	Name		Number	Name		Number	Name				Notes
87	Monument 87	58°31′23″N 133°33′32″W		97	Mount Bressler	58°55′25″N 134°20′12″W		108	Boundary Peak 108	59°23′15″N 134°59′21″W	
88	Monument 88	58°33′06″N 133°36′21″W		98	Mount Nesselrode	58°57′45″N 134°18′48″W		109	Boundary Peak 109	59°25′38″N 135°06′01″W	
89	Monument 89	58°34′47″N 133°39′09″W		99	Boundary Peak 99	58°58′46″N 134°24′24″W		110	Mount Hefty	59°27′07″N 135°04′35″W	
90	Monument 90	58°35′06″N 133°39′43″W		100	Mount London	59°02′20″N 134°22′55″W		111	Boundary Peak 111	59°28′29″N 135°01′39″W	
91	Monument 91	58°35′35″N 133°40′29″W		101	Mount Service	59°05′21″N 134°26′48″W		112	Monument 112	59°32′22″N 135°01′45″W	
92	Boundary Peak 92	58°36′44″N 133°42′25″W		102	Mount Poletica	59°07′55″N 134°29′02″W		113	Monument 113	59°32′39″N 135°01′45″W	
93	Devils Paw	58°43′46″N 133°50′17″W		103	Mount Hislop	59°07′52″N 134°33′55″W		114	Monument 114	59°33′50″N 135°01′46″W	See Note: (Note: USGS Topographic maps show Monument 114 as a monument at with an elevation of 6,788ft, while Google Maps shows it as Boundary Peak 114 with the name of White Pass at with an elevation of 2,107 m. The actual Peak called White Pass is located north of the Google Map coordinates.)
94	Gisel Peak	58°46′02″N 133°58′11″W		104	Mount Pullen	59°11′33″N 134°40′43″W		115	Monument 115	59°37′11″N 135°06′48″W	
	Elephant Promontory	58°48′59″N 134°07′22″W		105	Mount Canning	59°15′00″N 134°41′41″W		116	Monument 116	59°37′23″N 135°07′07″W	
95	Mount Ogilive	58°51′39″N 134°15′30″W		106	Snowtop Mtn	59°16′51″N 134°57′36″W		117	Monument 117	59°37′28″N 135°08′21″W	
96	Boundary Peak 96	58°54′06″N 134°18′29″W		107	Mount Bagot	59°20′47″N 135°01′48″W					

The Coordinates provided above were taken from the most current satellite photographs(Google Earth Pro) and as such represent the most accurate representation of the location of the boundary peak. Topographic maps of this area are dated (see USGS Historical Topographic maps) and do not provide the accuracy of the Global Positioning System that recent Satellite photographs have. Boundary Peaks 87–91 and 112–117 are not actually summits, but monuments (survey markers) placed by the U.S. National Geodetic Survey.

== USGS Geographic Names Information System omissions ==
The following table contains those geographical features that utilize a name that has not been entered into the USGS Geographic Names Information System database. The sources of the names are from local references and scientific papers.

Unofficial	Coordinates	Elevation	Elevation by Source			Referenced	Remarks
Name			GNIS	Topo	Other		Notes
Cloudcap Peak (Alaska)	58°43′46″N 133°50′17″W	8,000 ft (2,438 m)	N/A		8,000		See Note: (Note: The location of Cloudcap Peak is unknown, the coordinate displayed is approximate.)
Mount Everlast (Alaska)	58°47′01″N 134°09′32″W	6,640 ft (2,024 m)	N/A		7,000 ft		
Scibetta Spire (Alaska)	58°43′46″N 133°50′17″W	6,500 ft (1,981 m)	N/A		6,500 ft		See Note: (Note: The location of Scibetta Spire is unknown, the coordinate displayed is approximate.)
Red Mountain	58°43′46″N 133°50′17″W	6,500 ft (1,981 m)	N/A		6,500 ft		

== See also ==
- Geospatial Summary of the Research and Recreational facilities within the Juneau Icefield area
- List of Boundary Peaks of the Alaska–British Columbia/Yukon border
- List of glaciers and icefields
- USGS Historical Topographic Maps for the Juneau Icefield area

== Sources ==
=== Geographical information systems ===
BC Geographical Names (BCGN) database

Peakbagger.com database

Bivouac database

=== Other ===
American Alpine Club publications

Crevasse Zone publications

Organizations, club newsletters, blogs, reports etc.

General references

=== Research references ===
- USGS Geonames
- Juneau Icefield Research Project (1949-1958) by Cal Heusser
- CalTopo
- DeLorme
