= Rhino Peak =

Mountain in Alaska, United States

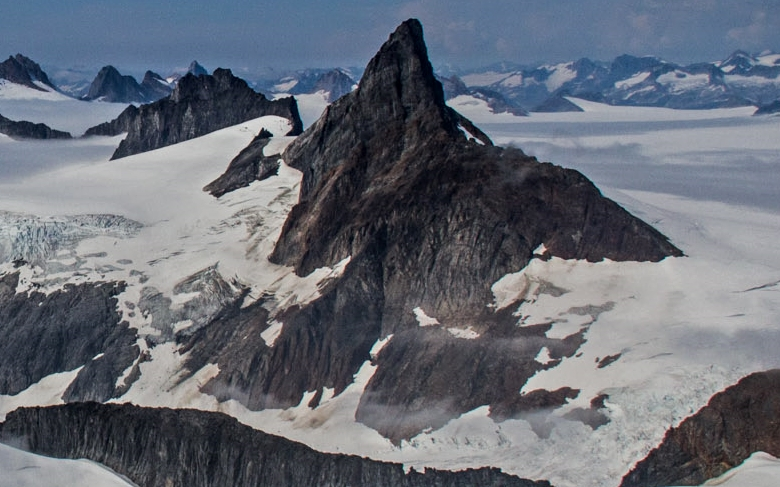
- Rhino Peak, south aspect

Highest point
- Elevation: 6,400+ ft (1,950+ m)
- Prominence: 1,000 ft (300 m)
- Parent peak: Princess Peak
- Isolation: 1.91 mi (3.07 km)
- Coordinates: 58°33′32″N 134°26′21″W

Geography
- Location within Alaska
- Location: Tongass National Forest; Juneau Borough; Alaska, United States
- Parent range: Coast Mountains; Boundary Ranges; Juneau Icefield
- Topo map: USGS Juneau C-2

Climbing
- Easiest route: class 5.2

Rhino Peak is a 6,400+ ft (1,950+ m) mountain summit located in the Boundary Ranges of the Coast Mountains, in the U.S. state of Alaska. The peak is situated on the Juneau Icefield, 18 mi (29 km) north of Juneau, and 2 mi (3 km) west of Princess Peak, on land managed by Tongass National Forest. Rhino Peak is set at the head of Mendenhall Glacier. This peak's descriptive name was published in 1960 by the U.S. Geological Survey.

== Climate ==
Based on the Köppen climate classification, Rhino Peak is located in a subarctic climate zone, with long, cold, snowy winters, and cool summers. Weather systems coming off the Gulf of Alaska are forced upwards by the Coast Mountains (orographic lift), causing heavy precipitation in the form of rainfall and snowfall. Temperatures can drop below −20 °C with wind chill factors below −30 °C. The month of July offers the most favorable weather to view or climb Rhino Peak.

== Gallery ==
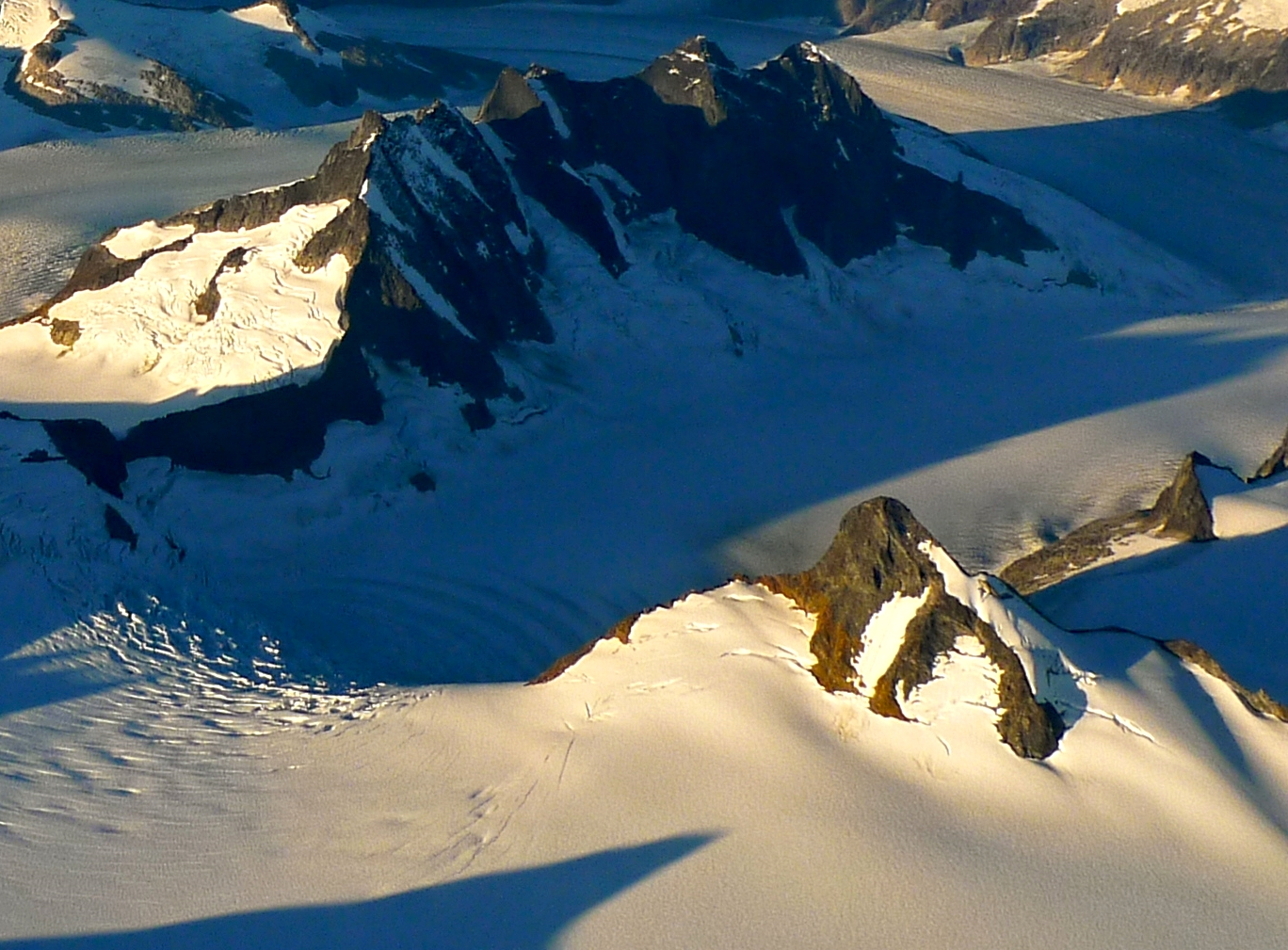
Mendenhall Towers and Rhino Peak

== See also ==
- Geospatial summary of the High Peaks/Summits of the Juneau Icefield
- Geography of Alaska
