= USGS Historical Topographic Maps for the Juneau Icefield area =

== USGS Historical Topographic Maps for the Juneau Icefield area ==
The Juneau Icefield is a geological icefield located just north and east of Juneau, Alaska and continues north to the Skagway, Alaska area. Current research of Climate Change in the field of Glaciology relies upon comparison of historical glacier mass-balance to current conditions. The United States Geological Survey (USGS) historical topographic maps, some more than 65 years old, are useful to a glaciologist in determining glacier change.

These maps were provided by the United States Geological Survey (USGS) and archived to Wikimedia Commons. They are scanned (by the USGS) images of the original paper maps that were published from 1948 to 1997. The information contained in the table below was transcribed from the paper map images displayed in the Image Array.

Quadrangle		Date			Field		Topographic			Remarks
Area	Map	Published (Note: This was the year that the map was originally published)	Revised (Note: This was the year that the map was last revised)	Aerial Photo (Note: This was the year that the aerial photographs were taken that the topology is based upon)	Annotated	Checked	Scale	Contour	Download (Note: Map download location was determined at: http://historicalmaps.arcgis.com/usgs/)	Notes
Atlin	A-7	1960		1948	1960	No	1:63360	100	(Note: https://ims.er.usgs.gov/gda_services/download?item_id=5662972)	Mount London, Mount Service, Mount Poletica
Atlin	A-8	1960		1948/1961	1960	No	1:63360	100	(Note: https://ims.er.usgs.gov/gda_services/download?item_id=5662976)	Mount Pullen, Meade Glacier
Atlin	B-8	1960		1948	1960	No	1:63360	100	(Note: https://ims.er.usgs.gov/gda_services/download?item_id=5662978)	Snowtop Mountain
Juneau	B-1	1997		1996	1997	No	1:63360	100	(Note: https://ims.er.usgs.gov/gda_services/download?item_id=5667448)	Norris Glacier, Taku Glacier terminus
Juneau	B-2	1949		Sept, 1942		No	1:63360	100	(Note: https://ims.er.usgs.gov/gda_services/download?item_id=5667462)	Mendenhall Glacier
Juneau	B-3	1949		Sept, 1942		No	1:62500	100	(Note: https://ims.er.usgs.gov/gda_services/download?item_id=5667476)	Auke Bay, Alaska
Juneau	C-1	1960	1971	1947	1960	No	1:63360	100	(Note: https://ims.er.usgs.gov/gda_services/download?item_id=5667504)	Matthes Glacier, Demorest Glacier
Juneau	C-2	1960		1948		No	1:63360	100	(Note: https://ims.er.usgs.gov/gda_services/download?item_id=5667508)	Taku Glacier, Mendenhall Glacier, Herbert Glacier
Juneau	C-3	1975	1996	1947		No	1:63360	100	(Note: https://ims.er.usgs.gov/gda_services/download?item_id=5667510)	Eagle Glacier
Juneau	D-1	1960	1975	1948/61		No	1:63360	100	(Note: https://ims.er.usgs.gov/gda_services/download?item_id=5667542)	
Juneau	D-2	1997		1996		No	1:63360	100	(Note: https://ims.er.usgs.gov/gda_services/download?item_id=5667546)	Bucher Glacier, Gilkey (lower)
Juneau	D-3	1953		1948		No	1:63360	100	(Note: https://ims.er.usgs.gov/gda_services/download?item_id=5667556)	
Juneau	D-4	1951		July, 1948		No	1:63360	100	(Note: https://ims.er.usgs.gov/gda_services/download?item_id=5667568)	Mid Lynn Canal
Skagway	A-1	1951		August, 1948		No	1:63360	100	(Note: https://ims.er.usgs.gov/gda_services/download?item_id=5673042)	
Skagway	B-1	1951		July, 1948		No	1:63360	100	(Note: https://ims.er.usgs.gov/gda_services/download?item_id=5667452)	
Taku River	B-5	1951		1948		No	1:63360	100	(Note: https://ims.er.usgs.gov/gda_services/download?item_id=5682525)	Wright Glacier
Taku River	B-6	1948		1951		No	1:63360	100	(Note: https://ims.er.usgs.gov/gda_services/download?item_id=5673618)	South of Taku River
Taku River	C-5	1960		1948		No	1:63360	100	(Note: https://ims.er.usgs.gov/gda_services/download?item_id=5673620)	Wright Glacier
Taku River	C-6	1960	1995	1947		No	1:63360	100	(Note: https://ims.er.usgs.gov/gda_services/download?item_id=5682531)	Twin Glaciers

Notes

USGS Historical Topographic Maps (1:63360) for the Juneau Icefield area

Skagway B-1 (1951)

Atlin B-8 (1960)

Skagway A-1 (1951))

Atlin A-8 (1960)

Atlin A-7 (1960)

Juneau D-4 (1951))

Juneau D-3 (1953)

Juneau D-2 (1997)

Juneau D-1 (1960)

Juneau C-4

Juneau C-3 (1996R)

Juneau C-2 (1960)

Juneau C-1 (1971R)

Taku River C-6 (1995)

Taku River C-5 (1960)

Juneau B-4

Juneau B-3 (1949)

Juneau B-2 (1949)

Juneau B-1 (1997)

Taku River B-6 (1994)

Taku River B-5 (1951)

== See also ==
- Geospatial Summary of the Research and Recreational facilities within the Juneau Icefield area
- Geospatial Summary of the High Peaks/Summits of the Juneau Icefield

== Sources ==
=== Mapping Systems ===
USGS Historical Maps(HM)
