= Glacier King =

Mountain in Alaska, United States

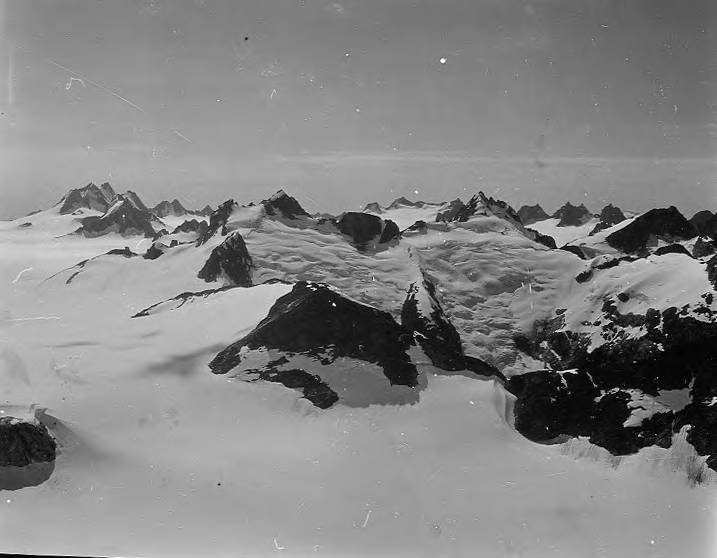
- Northeast aspect to right of center

Highest point
- Elevation: 6,500 ft (1,981 m)
- Prominence: 1,500 ft (457 m)
- Parent peak: The Tusk
- Isolation: 1.37 mi (2.20 km)
- Coordinates: 58°42′33″N 134°28′19″W

Geography
- Location within Alaska
- Interactive map of Glacier King
- Country: United States
- State: Alaska
- Borough: Juneau
- Protected area: Tongass National Forest
- Parent range: Coast Mountains; Boundary Ranges
- Topo map: USGS Juneau C-2

Geology
- Rock age: Late Cretaceous
- Rock type: Granitic
- Volcanic arc: Coast Range Arc

Glacier King is a 6,500-foot-elevation (1,981-meter) mountain summit in Alaska, United States.

== Description ==
Glacier King is located in the Boundary Ranges of the Coast Mountains and set on land managed by Tongass National Forest. The remote peak is 1.38 miles (2.22 km) east-southeast of The Tusk and 28 miles (45 km) north of Juneau on the western margin of the Juneau Icefield. Precipitation runoff and glacial meltwater from the mountain's north slope drains to Berners Bay and Lynn Canal via the Gilkey River, whereas the south slope is surrounded by the Taku Glacier. Topographic relief is significant as the north face rises 4,500 feet (1,370 m) in 1.25 miles (2.01 km). The mountain's descriptive name was applied by members of the Juneau Icefield Research Project in 1964 and the toponym was officially adopted in 1965 by the United States Board on Geographic Names.

== Climate ==
Based on the Köppen climate classification, Glacier King is located in a tundra climate zone with long, cold, snowy winters, and cool summers. Weather systems coming off the Gulf of Alaska are forced upwards by the Coast Mountains (orographic lift), causing heavy precipitation in the form of rainfall and snowfall. Winter temperatures can drop to 0 °F with wind chill factors below −10 °F. This climate supports the Taku Glacier south of the peak, the Juneau Icefield east of the peak, and unnamed glaciers on the north slope.

== Gallery ==
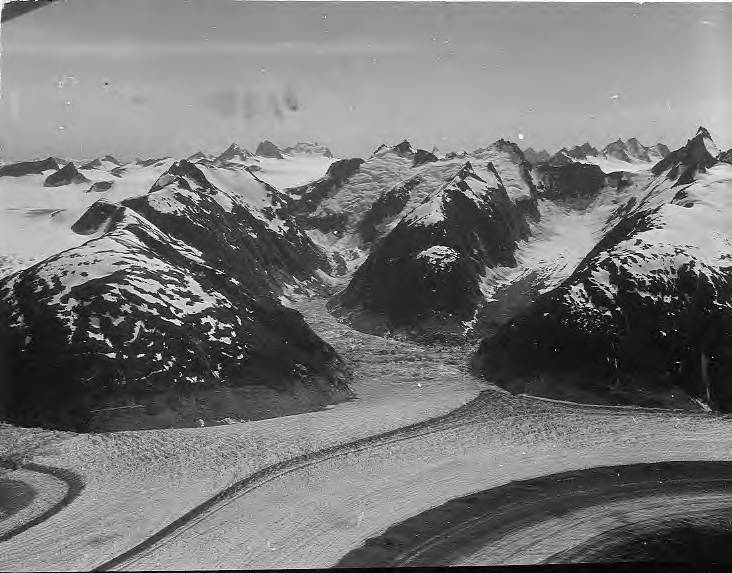
Glacier King to right and The Tusk at upper right edge of frame. Gilkey Glacier in lower part of frame.

== See also ==
- Geospatial summary of the High Peaks/Summits of the Juneau Icefield
- Geography of Alaska
