= Nelles Peak =

Mountain in British Columbia, Canada

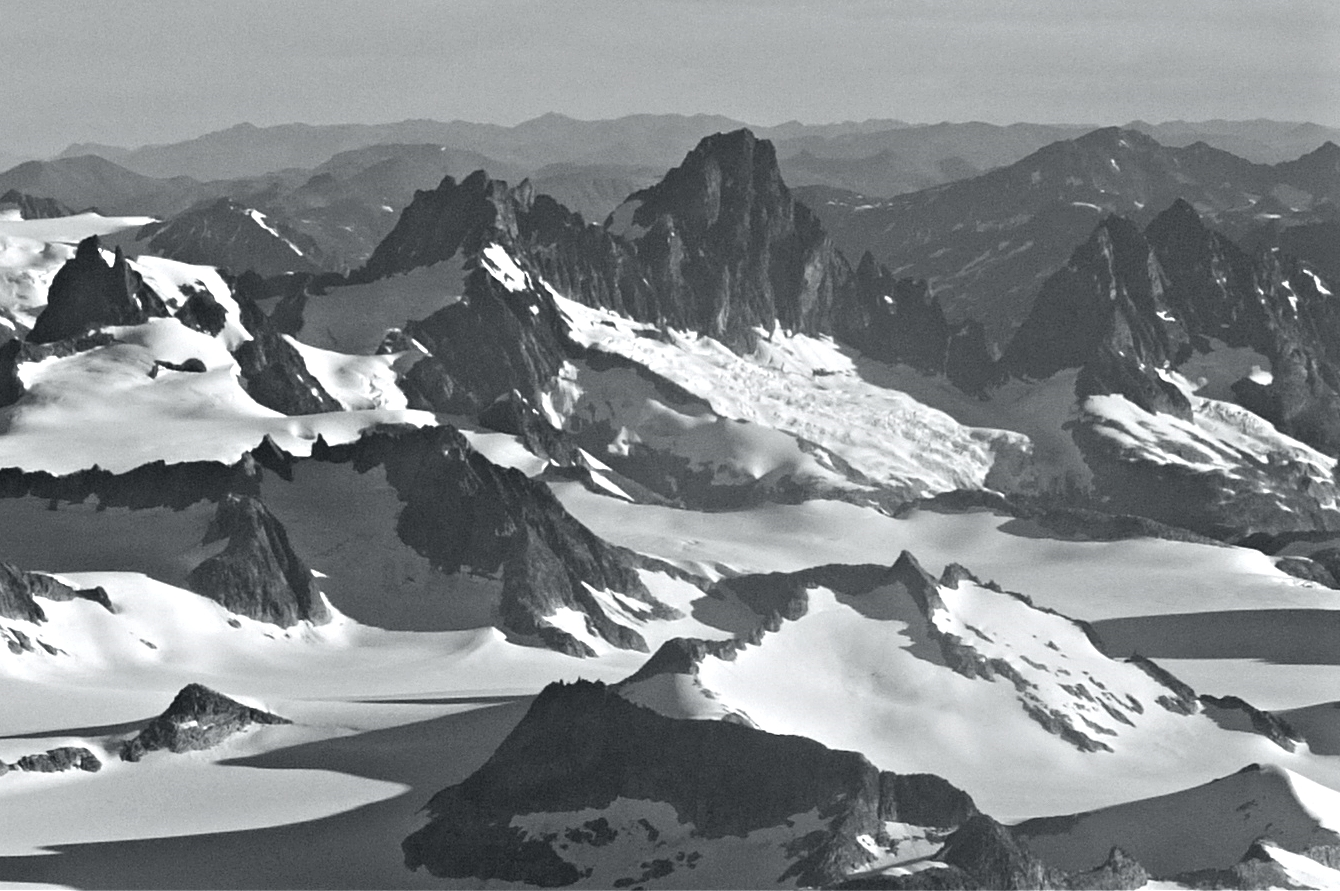
- Nelles Peak, south aspect

Highest point
- Elevation: 2,531 m (8,304 ft)
- Prominence: 1,081 m (3,547 ft)
- Parent peak: Devils Paw (2616 m)
- Isolation: 9.27 km (5.76 mi)
- Listing: Mountains of British Columbia
- Coordinates: 58°48′15″N 133°54′53″W

Geography
- Location within British Columbia Location within Canada
- Location: British Columbia, Canada
- District: Cassiar Land District
- Parent range: Juneau Icefield; Boundary Ranges; Coast Mountains
- Topo map: NTS 104K13 Tulsequah Glacier

Geology
- Rock age: early Tertiary
- Rock type: pyroclastic

Nelles Peak is a remote 2,531-metre (8,304-foot) mountain summit located in the Coast Mountains of British Columbia, Canada. It is situated at the northeastern periphery of the Juneau Icefield, 5.0 km (3.1 mi) inside the BC-Alaska boundary, on the west side of Tulsequah Lake. Its nearest higher peak is Devils Paw, 9.0 km (5.6 mi) to the southeast. Nelles Peak is the second-highest summit of the icefield, after Devils Paw. The mountain was named in 1924 to honor Douglas H. Nelles (1881–1960), a Canadian engineer who participated with the International Boundary Survey party of 1907. The mountain's name was officially adopted in 1947 when approved by the Geographical Names Board of Canada.

== Climate ==
Based on the Köppen climate classification, Nelles Peak has a subarctic climate with cold, snowy winters, and mild summers. Most weather fronts originate in the Pacific Ocean, and travel east toward the Coast Mountains where they are forced upward by the range (Orographic lift), causing them to drop their moisture in the form of rain or snowfall. As a result, the Coast Mountains experience high precipitation, especially during the winter months in the form of snowfall. Temperatures can drop below −20 °C with wind chill factors below −30 °C. Precipitation runoff from Nelles Peak drains into the Tulsequah River which in turn empties into Taku River. The month of July offers the most favorable weather for viewing and climbing Nelles.

== See also ==
- Geospatial summary of the High Peaks/Summits of the Juneau Icefield
