= Mount Leland (Alaska) =

Mountain in Alaska, United States

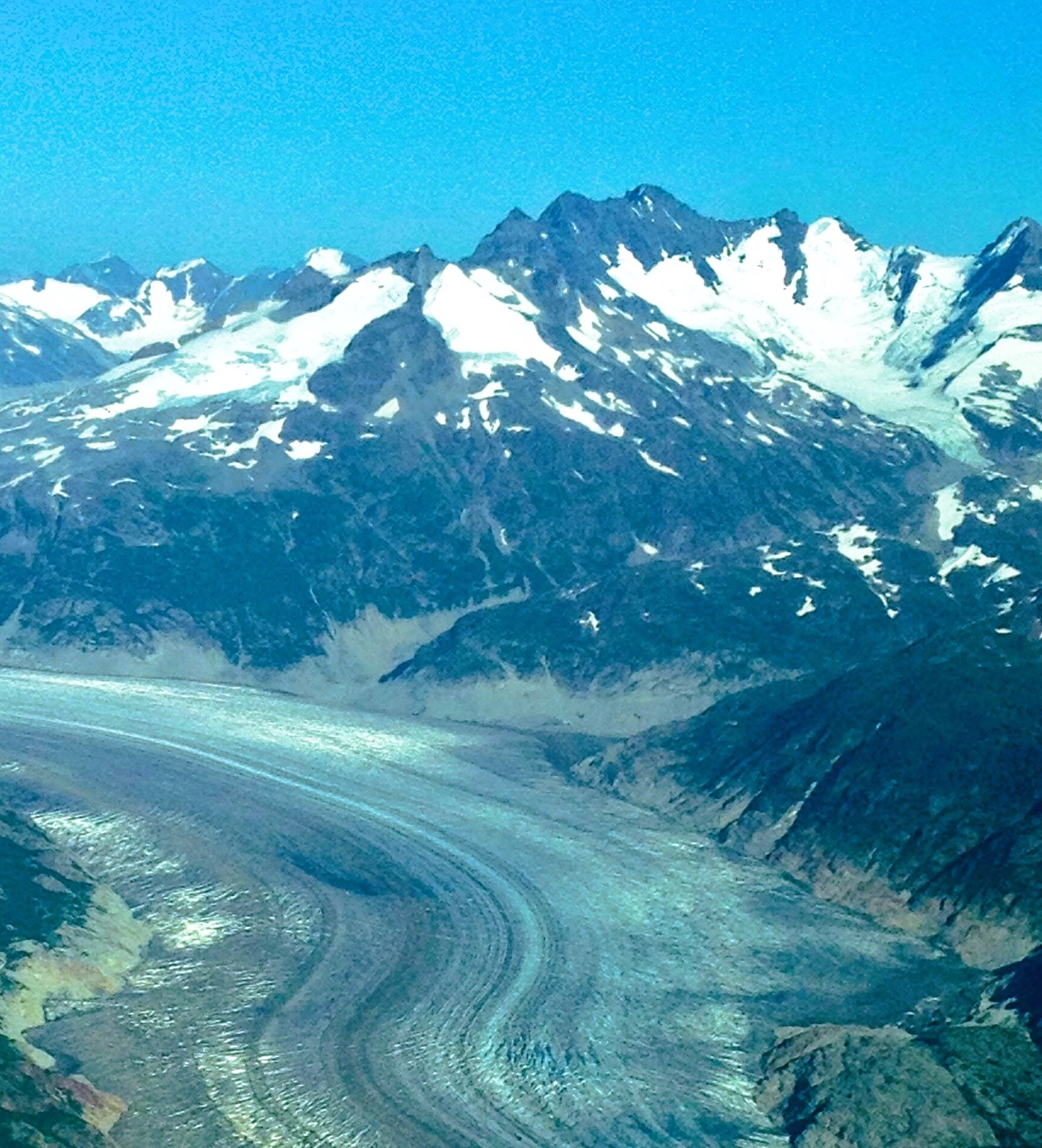
- West aspect, with Meade Glacier

Highest point
- Elevation: 7,810 ft (2,380 m)
- Prominence: 3,010 ft (917 m)
- Parent peak: Mount Service
- Isolation: 13.46 mi (21.66 km)
- Coordinates: 59°10′13″N 134°47′30″W

Naming
- Etymology: Ora Miner Leland

Geography
- Location within Alaska
- Country: United States
- State: Alaska
- Borough: Haines
- Protected area: Tongass National Forest
- Parent range: Coast Mountains; Boundary Ranges
- Topo map: USGS Atlin A-8

Geology
- Rock age: Late Cretaceous
- Rock type: Granitic
- Volcanic arc: Coast Range Arc

Mount Leland is a 7,810-foot-elevation (2,380-meter) glaciated mountain summit located in the Boundary Ranges of the Coast Mountains, in the U.S. state of Alaska. It is situated 27 miles (43 km) southeast of Skagway along the western edge of the Juneau Icefield, on land managed by Tongass National Forest. Topographic relief is significant as the summit rises 4,400 feet (1,340 m) above the Meade Glacier in 1.25 mi (2.01 km). Precipitation runoff and glacial meltwater from the mountain drains to Lynn Canal via the Katzehin River. Mount Leland's toponym was officially adopted in 1972 by the U.S. Board on Geographic Names to commemorate surveyor Ora Miner Leland (1876–1962), who led the International Boundary Commission Party of 1907. The peak rises a little over four miles (6.4 km) from the US–Canada boundary.

== Climate ==
Based on the Köppen climate classification, Mount Leland is located in a subpolar oceanic climate zone, with long, cold, wet winters, and cool summers. Most weather fronts originate in the Pacific Ocean, and travel east toward the Coast Mountains where they are forced upward by the range (orographic lift), causing them to drop their moisture in the form of rain or snowfall. As a result, the Coast Mountains experience high precipitation, especially during the winter months in the form of snowfall. Winter temperatures can drop below 0 °F with wind chill factors below −10 °F. This climate supports the Meade Glacier surrounding the peak.

== See also ==
- Geography of Alaska
- Geospatial summary of the High Peaks/Summits of the Juneau Icefield
