= Mount Nesselrode =

Mountain in British Columbia, Canada, and Alaska, US

- Boundary Peak 98
- Location within Alaska Location within British Columbia

Highest point
- Elevation: 8,117 ft (2,474 m)
- Prominence: 3,031 ft (924 m)
- Coordinates: 58°57′43″N 134°18′48″W

Geography
- Location: Stikine Region, British Columbia; Glacier Bay National Park and Preserve, Alaska
- Topo map: NTS 104L16 Mount Ogilvie

Climbing
- First ascent: August 1973

Mount Nesselrode, also known as Boundary Peak 98, is a 2,474 m (8,117 ft) peak in the Boundary Ranges of the Coast Mountains, located on and in part defining the border between British Columbia, Canada, and Alaska, United States. About 40 miles (64 km) north of Juneau to the west of the lower Stikine River and in the heart of the Stikine Icecap in Juneau Icefield southwest of Atlin Lake, the summit, with a prominence of 924 m (3,031 ft), is also the corner point of Alaska's Haines Borough and Juneau Borough.

It was named in 1924 on the 100th anniversary of the Russo-American Treaty of 1824 in honour of Karl Nesselrode, also known as Charles de Nesselrode, then Russian Minister of Foreign Affairs and a plenipotentiary in the negotiations that produced the Russo-American Treaty of 1824 and defined the boundary between Russian America and US claims to the Oregon Country and was mirrored in a parallel Russian treaty with the British the next year, defining 54°40′ north as the southward limit of Russian possessions.

The first ascent of Mount Nesselrode was made in August 1973.
