= Emperor Peak (Alaska) =

Mountain in Alaska, United States

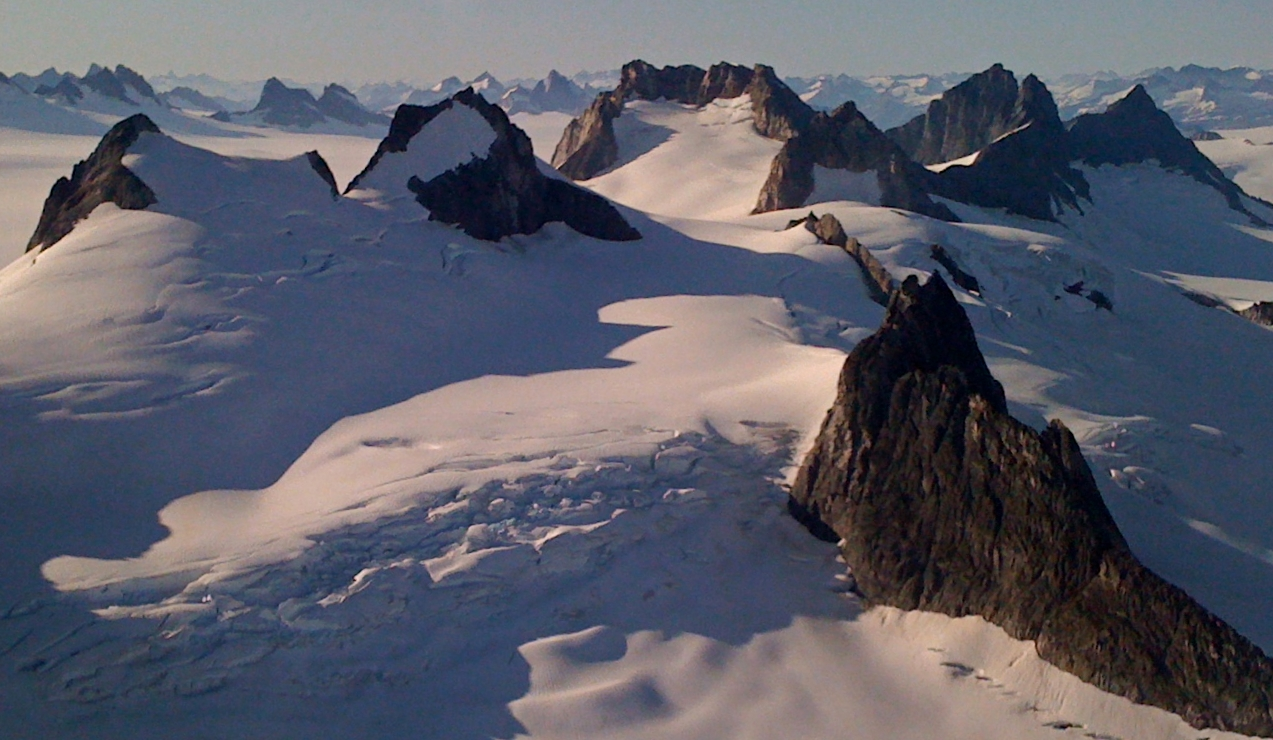
- Emperor Peak centered, from southeast (Princess Peak left, Taku Towers right)

Highest point
- Elevation: 6,805 ft (2,074 m)
- Prominence: 1,705 ft (520 m)
- Parent peak: The Snow Towers
- Isolation: 4.32 mi (6.95 km)
- Coordinates: 58°34′57″N 134°23′16″W

Geography
- Location within Alaska
- Interactive map of Emperor Peak
- Location: Tongass National Forest; Juneau Borough; Alaska, United States
- Parent range: Coast Mountains; Boundary Ranges; Juneau Icefield
- Topo map: USGS Juneau C-2

Emperor Peak is a 6,805 ft (2,070 m) glaciated mountain summit located in the Boundary Ranges of the Coast Mountains, in the U.S. state of Alaska. Emperor Peak is situated in the Taku Range of the Juneau Icefield, 20 mi (32 km) north of Juneau, and 1.2 mi (2 km) south-southwest of Taku Towers, on land managed by Tongass National Forest. The Taku Range is a north–south trending ridge on the edge of the Taku Glacier. This mountain was named in 1964 by members of the Juneau Icefield Research Project, and officially adopted in 1965 by the U.S. Geological Survey.

== Climate ==
Based on the Köppen climate classification, Emperor Peak is located in a subpolar oceanic climate zone, with long, cold, snowy winters, and cool summers. Weather systems coming off the Gulf of Alaska are forced upwards by the Coast Mountains (orographic lift), causing heavy precipitation in the form of rainfall and snowfall. Temperatures can drop below −20 °C with wind chill factors below −30 °C. The month of July offers the most favorable weather to view or climb Emperor Peak.

== Gallery ==
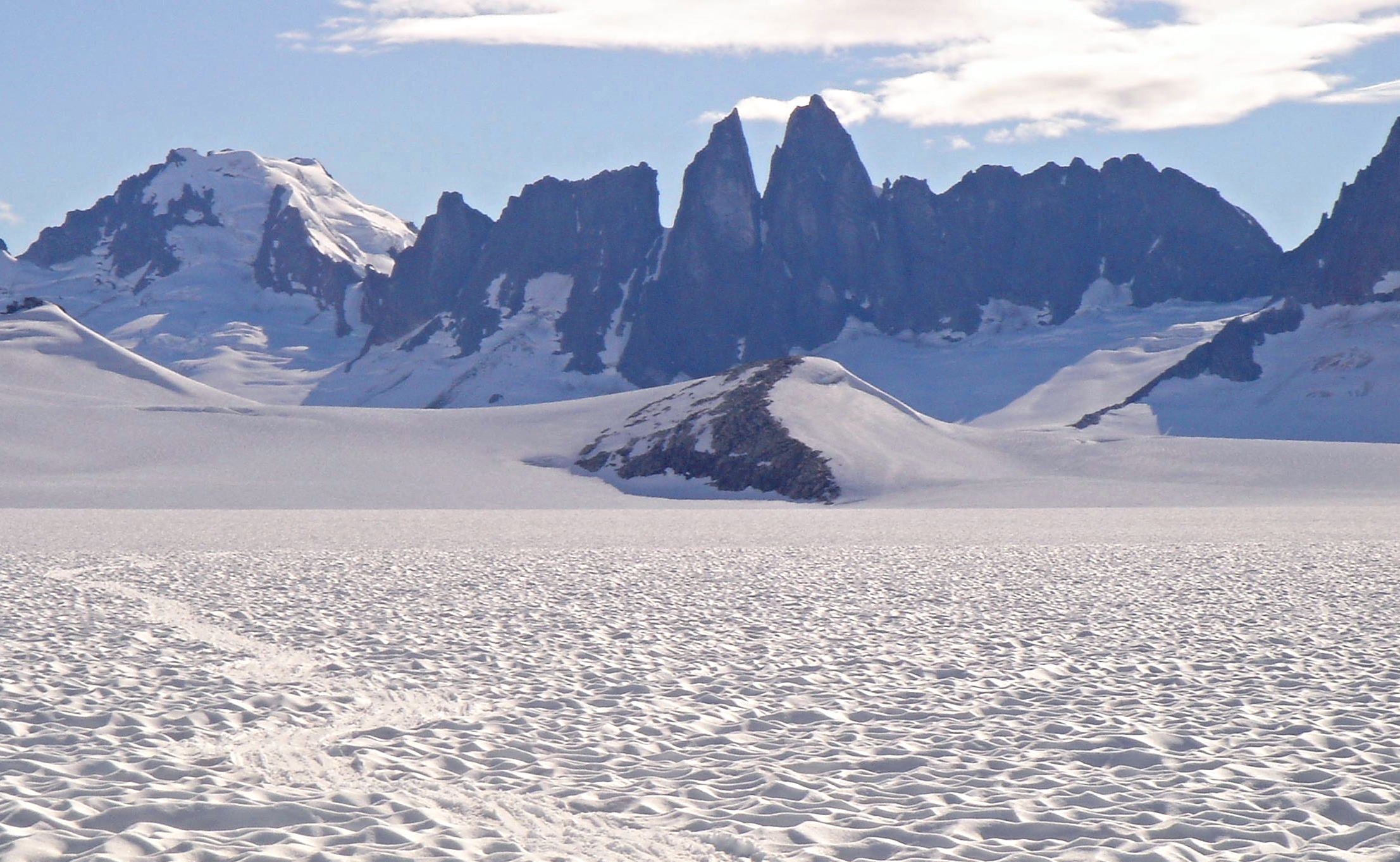
Emperor Peak (left) with Taku Towers centered

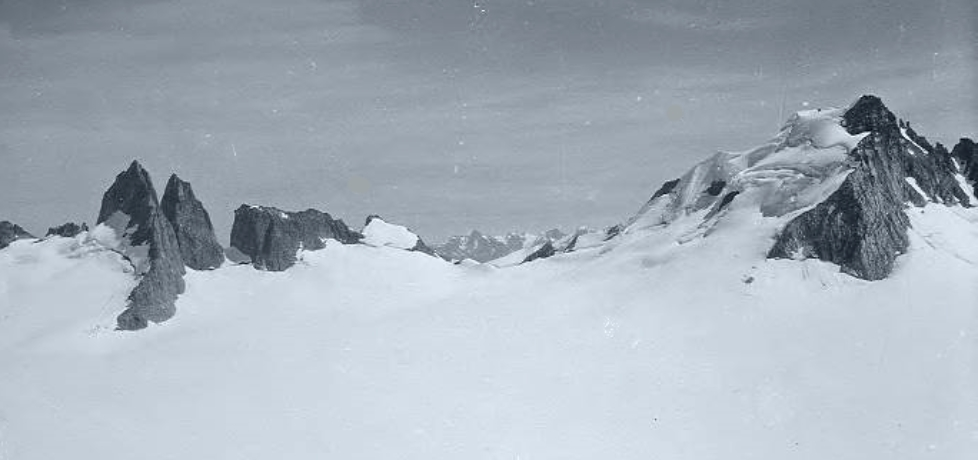
Taku Towers with Emperor Peak (right)

== See also ==
- List of mountain peaks of Alaska
- Geography of Alaska
