= Camp 4 Peak =

Mountain in Alaska, United States

- Location within Alaska

Highest point
- Elevation: 4,531 ft (1,381 m)
- Coordinates: 58°36′42″N 133°57′13″W

Geography
- Location: Juneau, Alaska, United States
- Parent range: Boundary Ranges
- Topo map: USGS Taku River C-6

Camp 4 Peak (also known as Research Mountain) is a mountain in the city and borough of Juneau, Alaska, United States. It is a part of the Boundary Ranges of the Coast Mountains in western North America. On the divide between East and West Twin Glaciers, it is located 5 miles north-northwest of Twin Glacier Lake and 27 miles northeast of the city of Juneau.

The peak was named by Maynard Miller after its use by the Juneau Icefield Research Program in 1965. It was entered into the United States Geological Survey's Geographic Names Information System on January 1, 2000.
