= Mount Ogilvie =

Mountain in Canada and the United States

- Boundary Peak 95
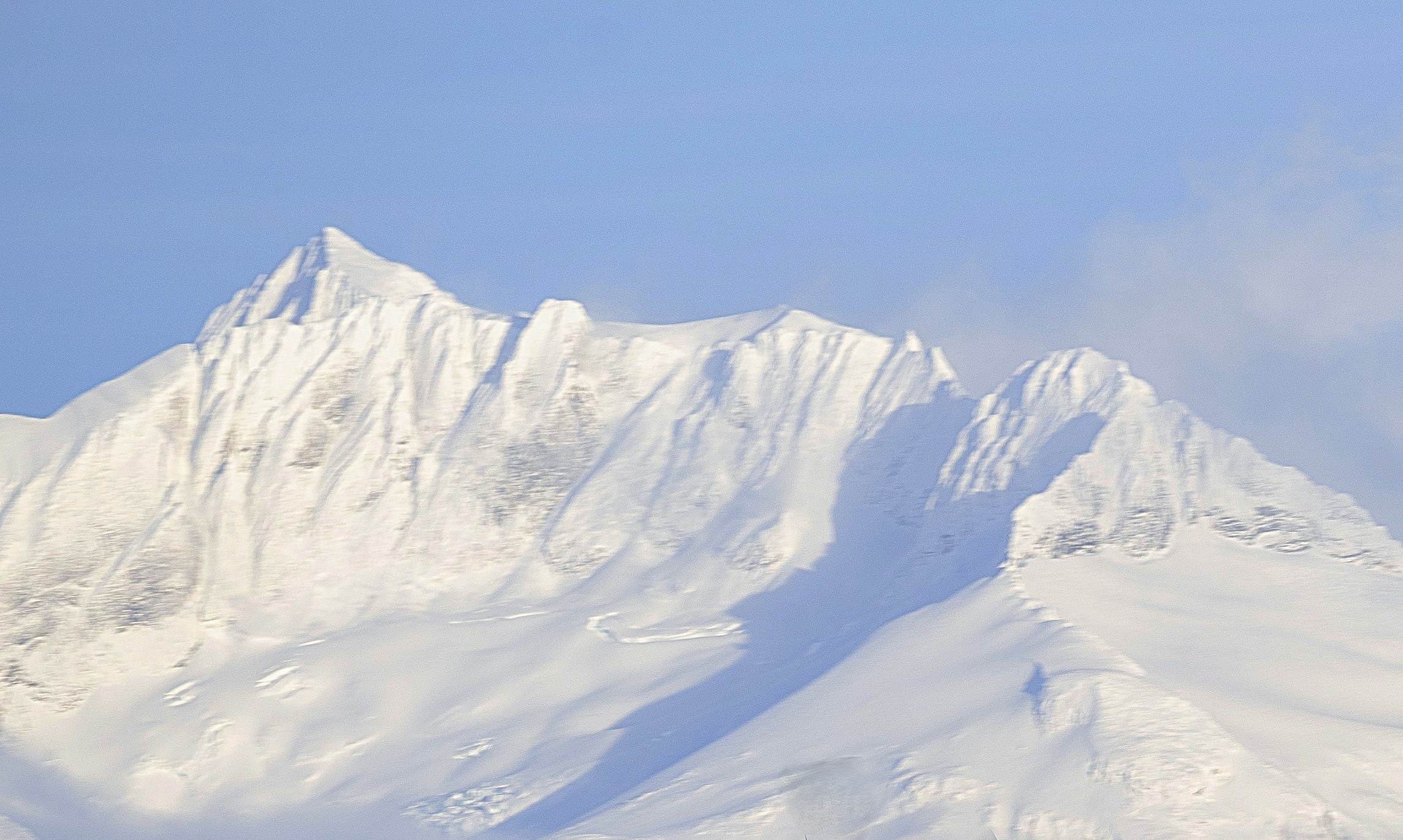
- West aspect

Highest point
- Elevation: 7,867 ft (2,398 m)
- Prominence: 1,252 ft (382 m)
- Parent peak: Mount Bressler
- Isolation: 5.15 mi (8.29 km)
- Coordinates: 58°51′40″N 134°15′28″W

Naming
- Etymology: William Ogilvie

Geography
- Location within Alaska Location within British Columbia
- Interactive map of Mount Ogilvie
- Location: Juneau Borough; Alaska, United States
- Country: Canada
- Province: British Columbia
- District: Cassiar Land District
- Protected area: Atlin/Áa Tlein Téix'i Provincial Park
- Parent range: Coast Mountains; Boundary Ranges; Juneau Icefield
- Topo map(s): NTS 104L16 Mount Ogilvie; USGS Juneau D-1

Geology
- Rock age: Late Cretaceous
- Rock type: Granitic
- Volcanic arc: Coast Range Arc

Mount Ogilvie is a 7,867-foot-elevation (2,398-meter) mountain summit located on, and in part defining, the international border between Alaska, United States, and British Columbia, Canada.

== Description ==
Mount Ogilvie, also known as Boundary Peak 95, is located in the Boundary Ranges of the Coast Mountains. The glaciated peak is situated 33 miles (53 km) north of Juneau in the Juneau Icefield, on land managed by Tongass National Forest. Although modest in elevation, relief is significant as the summit rises 3,400 feet (1,036 m) above the Gilkey Glacier in one mile (1.62 km). Precipitation runoff and glacial meltwater from the mountain drains to Lynn Canal via the Gilkey River. The nearest higher neighbor is Mount Bressler, five miles (8 km) to the northwest.

== Etymology ==
The mountain was named in 1923 by Lawrence Martin to honor William Ogilvie (1846–1912), a Canadian official whose surveys in 1893–95 helped establish the Alaska-Canada boundary. The toponym was officially adopted in 1923 by the U.S. Board on Geographic Names, and on March 31, 1924, by the Geographical Names Board of Canada.

== Climate ==
Based on the Köppen climate classification, Mount Ogilvie is located in a tundra climate zone with cold, snowy winters, and cool summers. Weather systems coming off the Gulf of Alaska are forced upwards by the Coast Mountains (orographic lift), causing heavy precipitation in the form of rainfall and snowfall. Winter temperatures can drop below −20 °C with wind chill factors below −30 °C. This climate supports the Gilkey Glacier, Vaughan Lewis Glacier, and the Juneau Icefield surrounding the mountain.

== Gallery ==
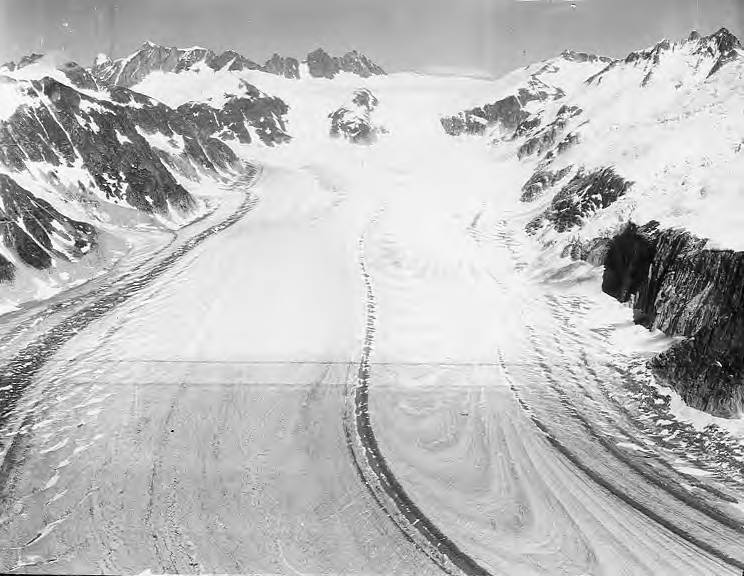
Mount Ogilvie on upper left skyline, Gilkey Glacier centered

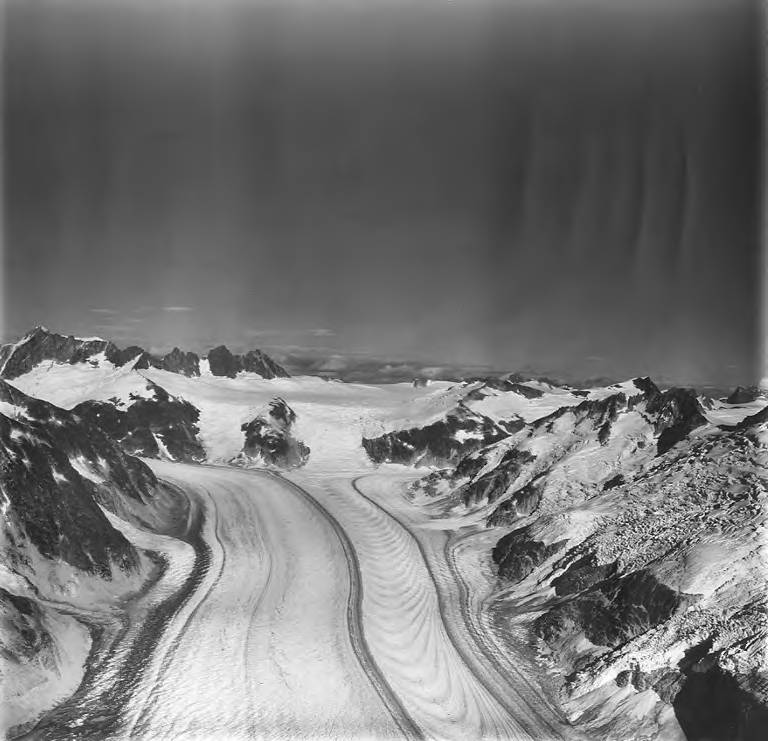
Mount Ogilvie in upper left, Gilkey Glacier in lower half of frame

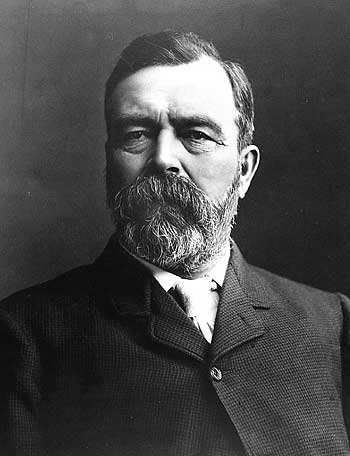
William Ogilvie

== See also ==
- Geography of Alaska
- List of Boundary Peaks of the Alaska–British Columbia/Yukon border
- Geospatial summary of the High Peaks/Summits of the Juneau Icefield
