= The Tusk (Alaska) =

Mountain in Alaska, United States

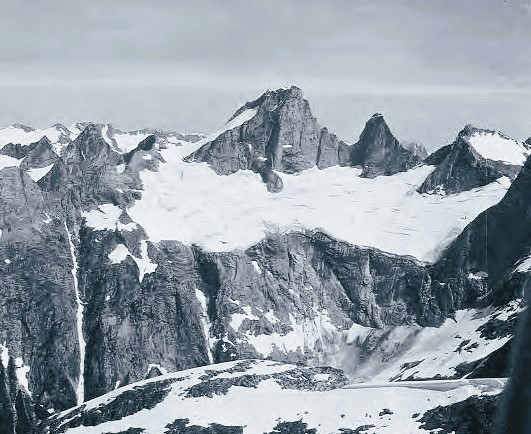
- West aspect

Highest point
- Elevation: 6,650 ft (2,027 m)
- Prominence: 1,700 ft (518 m)
- Parent peak: The Snow Towers
- Isolation: 4.11 mi (6.61 km)
- Coordinates: 58°43′07″N 134°30′20″W

Naming
- Etymology: Tusk

Geography
- Location within Alaska
- Interactive map of The Tusk
- Country: United States
- State: Alaska
- Borough: Juneau
- Protected area: Tongass National Forest
- Parent range: Coast Mountains; Boundary Ranges
- Topo map: USGS Juneau C-2

Climbing
- First ascent: 1972 Fred Beckey
- Easiest route: class 5.8

The Tusk is a 6,650-foot-elevation (2,027-meter) mountain summit in Alaska, United States.

== Description ==
The Tusk is located in the Boundary Ranges of the Coast Mountains and set on land managed by Tongass National Forest. The remote peak is four miles (6.4 km) east of Horn Spire and 24 miles (39 km) north of Juneau on the northwest margin of the Juneau Icefield. Precipitation runoff and glacial meltwater from the mountain drains west to Berners Bay and Lynn Canal via the Gilkey River. Topographic relief is significant as the summit rises 5,450 feet (1,660 m) above the Battle Glacier in two miles (3.2 km).

== History ==
The mountain's descriptive name was applied by members of the Juneau Icefield Research Project in 1964 and the toponym was officially adopted in 1965 by the United States Board on Geographic Names. The first ascent of the summit was made on August 2, 1972, by Fred Beckey, John Rupley, Dave Beckstead, and Ray Ketcham via the upper Taku Glacier.

== Climate ==
Based on the Köppen climate classification, The Tusk is located in a tundra climate zone with long, cold, snowy winters, and cool summers. Weather systems coming off the Gulf of Alaska are forced upwards by the Coast Mountains (orographic lift), causing heavy precipitation in the form of rainfall and snowfall. Winter temperatures can drop to 0 °F with wind chill factors below −10 °F. This climate supports the Taku Glacier, Battle Glacier, Gilkey Glacier, and the Juneau Icefield surrounding the peak.

== Gallery ==
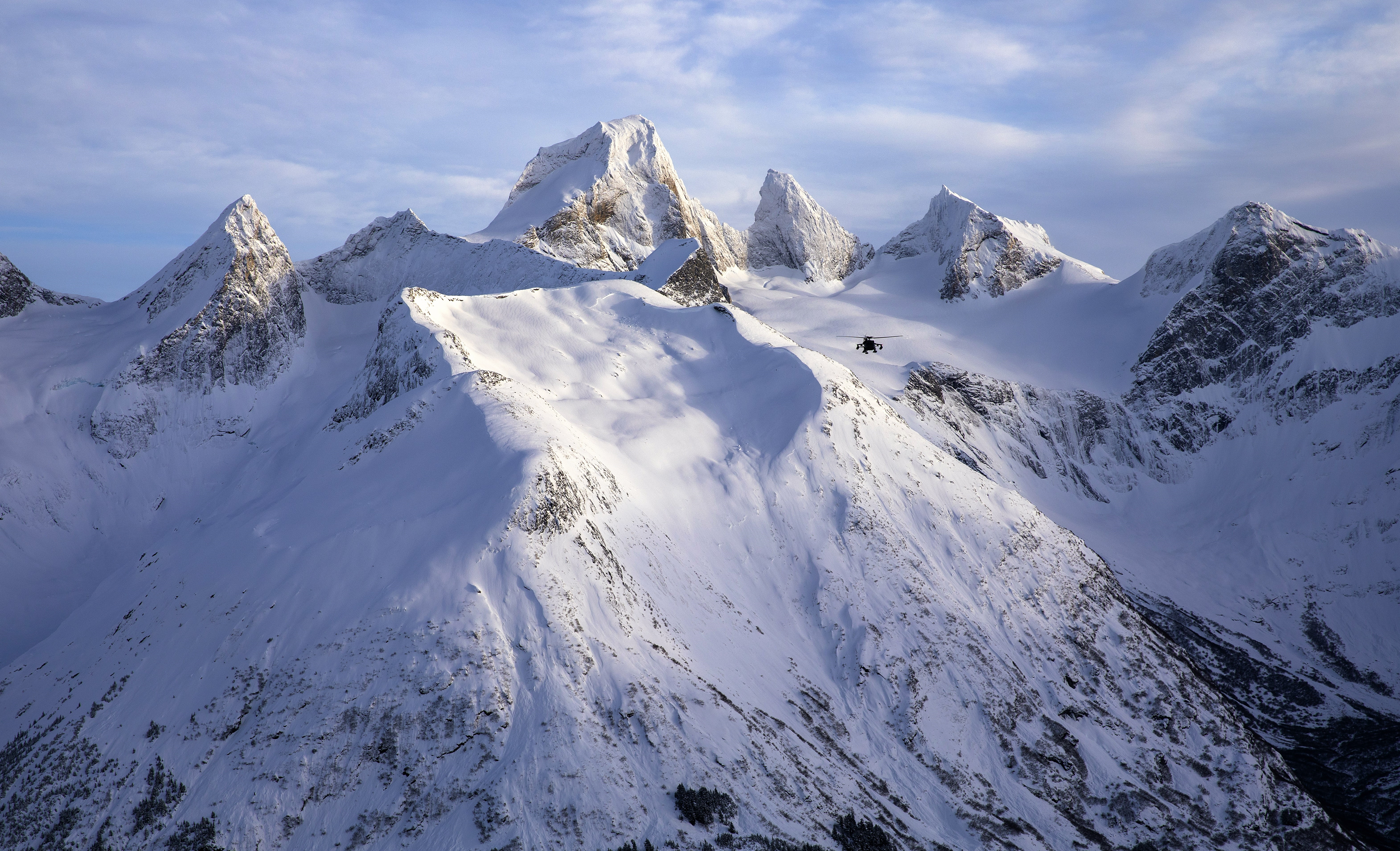
Aerial view of the west aspect of The Tusk

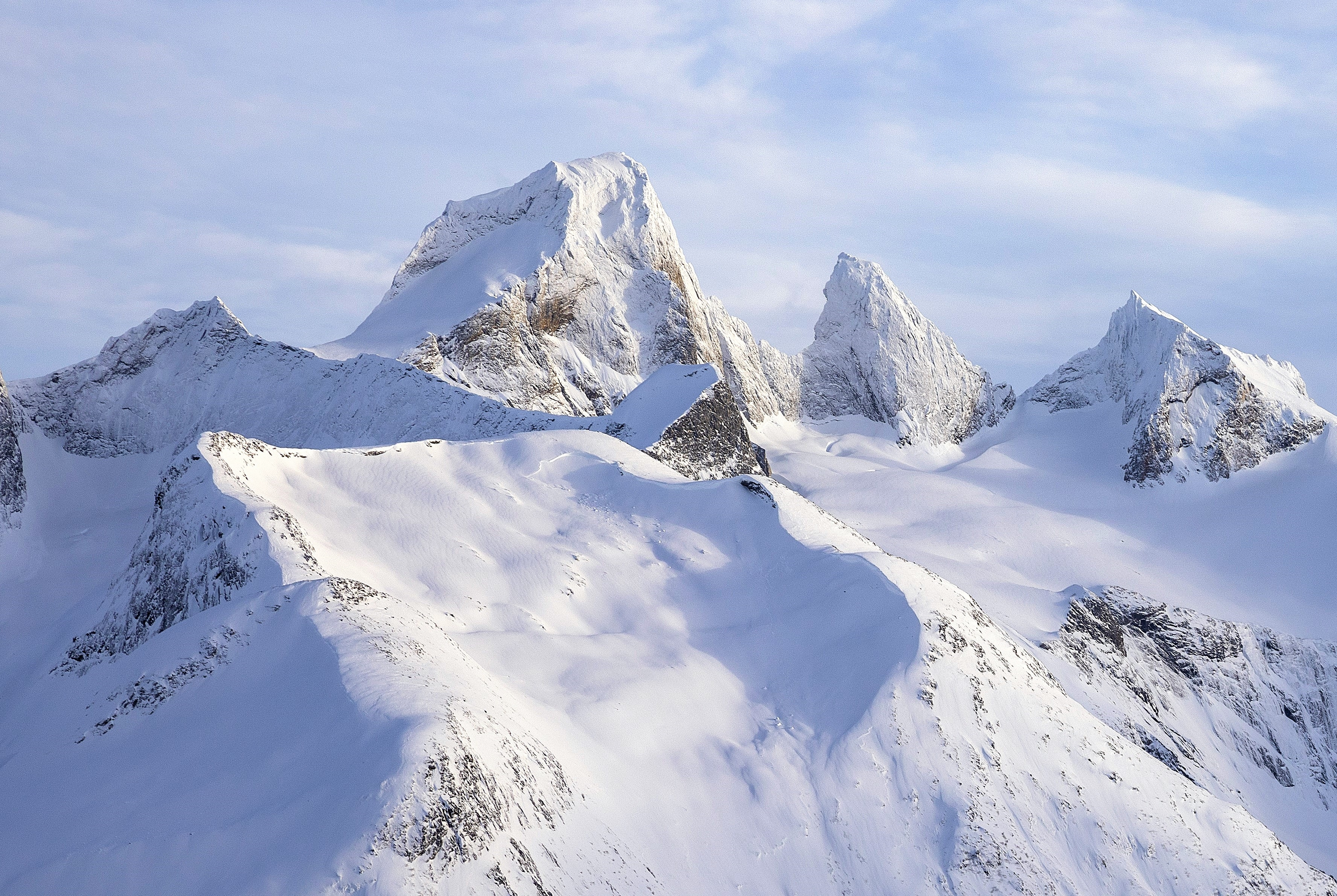
Aerial view of the west aspect of The Tusk

== See also ==
- Geospatial summary of the High Peaks/Summits of the Juneau Icefield
- Geography of Alaska
