= Mammary Peak =

Mountain in Alaska, United States

Coordinates: 58°48′59″N 134°16′04″W

Mammary Peak is a summit in Juneau City and Borough, Alaska, in the United States. With an elevation of 6,509 feet (1,984 m), Mammary Peak is the 358th tallest mountain in Alaska.

Its name originates from it having the shape of a woman's breast.

== See also ==
- Breast-shaped hill
