= Devils Paw =

Mountain in British Columbia, Canada

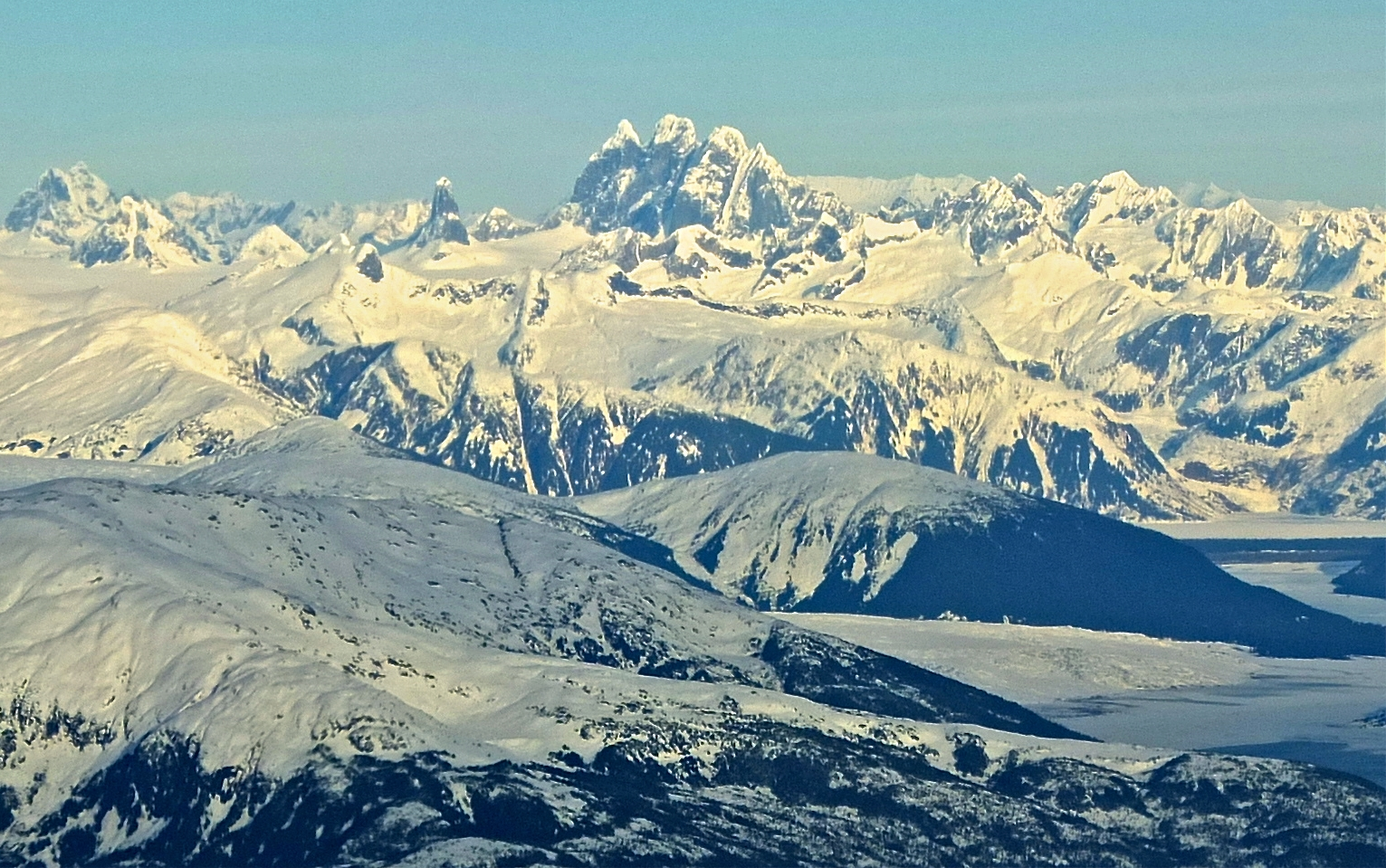
- Aerial view from the south

Highest point
- Elevation: 8,584 ft (2,616 m)
- Prominence: 5,686 ft (1,733 m)
- Listing: Mountains of British Columbia; Canada most prominent peak 75th; Canada most isolated peaks 45th; US most prominent peaks 86th; US most isolated peaks 68th
- Coordinates: 58°43′51″N 133°50′23″W

Geography
- Location within Alaska Location within British Columbia Location within Canada
- Interactive map of Devils Paw
- Location: Juneau City and Borough, Alaska, U.S. / Stikine Region, British Columbia, Canada
- Parent range: Juneau Icefield / Boundary Ranges
- Topo map: NTS 104K12 Tulsequah River

Devils Paw (or Devil's Paw, or Boundary Peak 93) is the high point of the Juneau Icefield, on the Alaska–British Columbia border. It is a part of the Boundary Ranges of the Coast Mountains. It is notable for its steep rise above the low local terrain. Its height is sometimes given as 8,507 feet (2,593 m).

Devils Paw is located on the northeast side of the Juneau Icefield, and its north slopes feed Tulsequah Lake and the Tulsequah Glacier. Its south slope forms the head of the picturesquely-named "Hades Highway", which is the eastern extremity of the Icefield.

To illustrate the steepness of the peak: the north face drops 7,000 ft (2,130 m) in approximately three miles (4.8 km), and the southeast side drops 8,000 ft (2,440 m) in about seven miles (11 km).

== Climate ==
Based on the Köppen climate classification, Devils Paw is located in a subpolar oceanic climate zone, with long, cold, snowy winters, and cool summers. Temperatures can drop below −20 °C with wind chill factors below −30 °C.

== Gallery ==
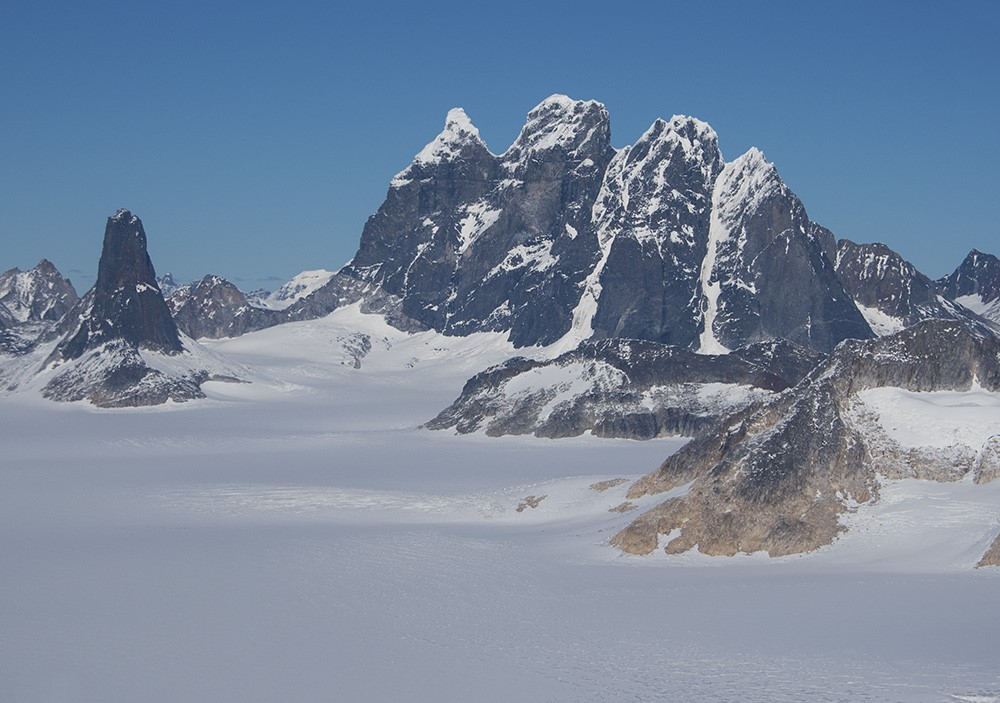
Devils Paw, with Michaels Sword on the left

== See also ==
- List of mountain peaks of North America
  - List of mountain peaks of Canada
  - List of mountain peaks of the United States

== Sources ==
- Devils Paw on Topozone
