= Princess Peak =

Glaciated mountain in Alaska, U.S.

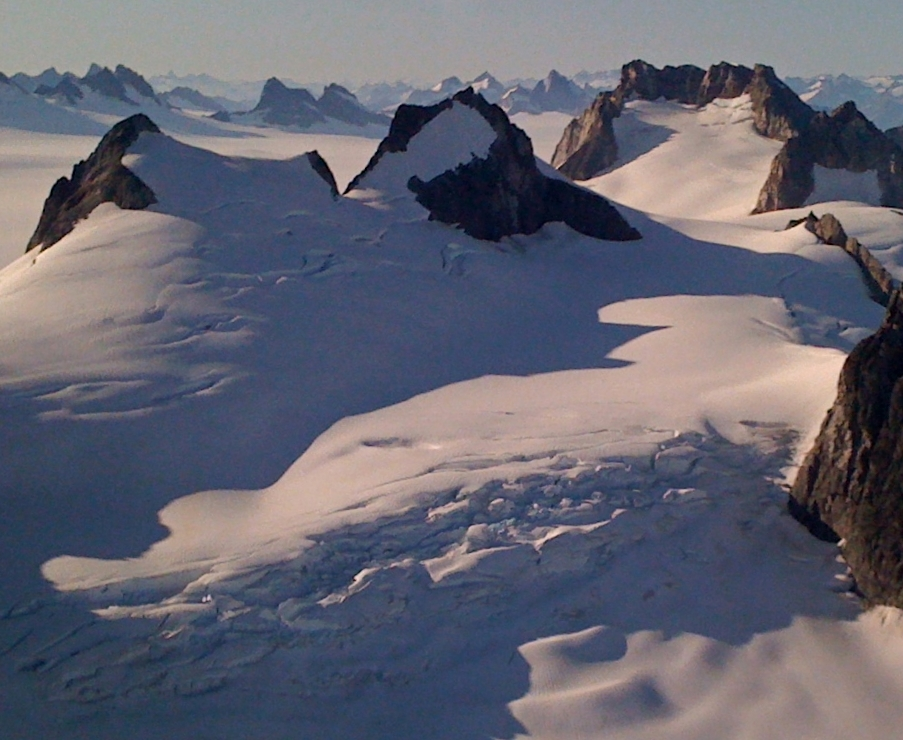
- Princess Peak centered, from southeast (Emperor Peak in upper right)

Highest point
- Elevation: 6,585 ft (2,007 m)
- Prominence: 985 ft (300 m)
- Parent peak: Emperor Peak
- Isolation: 1.63 mi (2.62 km)
- Coordinates: 58°33′34″N 134°22′39″W

Geography
- Location within Alaska
- Location: Tongass National Forest; Juneau Borough; Alaska, United States
- Parent range: Coast Mountains; Boundary Ranges; Juneau Icefield
- Topo map: USGS Juneau C-2

Princess Peak is a 6,585 ft (2,010 m) glaciated mountain summit located in the Boundary Ranges of the Coast Mountains, in the U.S. state of Alaska. Emperor Peak is situated in the Taku Range of the Juneau Icefield, 18 mi (29 km) north of Juneau, and 1.6 mi (3 km) south of Emperor Peak, on land managed by Tongass National Forest. The Taku Range is a north–south trending ridge on the edge of the Taku Glacier. This mountain was named in 1964 by members of the Juneau Icefield Research Project, and officially adopted in 1965 by the U.S. Board on Geographic Names.

== Climate ==
Based on the Köppen climate classification, Princess Peak is located in a subpolar oceanic climate zone, with long, cold, snowy winters, and cool summers. Weather systems coming off the Gulf of Alaska are forced upwards by the Coast Mountains (orographic lift), causing heavy precipitation in the form of rainfall and snowfall. Temperatures can drop below −20 °C with wind chill factors below −30 °C. The month of July offers the most favorable weather to view or climb Princess Peak.

== See also ==
- List of mountain peaks of Alaska
- Geography of Alaska
