= Mount London =

Mountain in British Columbia, Canada

- Boundary Peak 100
- Location within Alaska Location within British Columbia Location within Canada

Highest point
- Elevation: 2,326 m (7,631 ft)
- Prominence: 396 m (1,299 ft)
- Coordinates: 59°02′20″N 134°22′55″W

Geography
- Location: British Columbia, Canada / Alaska, U.S.
- Parent range: Boundary Ranges
- Topo map: NTS 104M1 Mount Caplice

Mount London, also known as Boundary Peak 100, 2,326 m (7,631 ft), is a mountain on the Alaska-British Columbia boundary in the Juneau Icefield of the Boundary Ranges of the Coast Mountains, located southwest of Atlin, British Columbia on the border with Haines Borough Alaska. Originally called Mount Atlin, it was renamed in honour of the famous author Jack London (1876–1916).
