= Pacific Coast Ranges =

Series of mountain ranges along the Pacific coast of North America

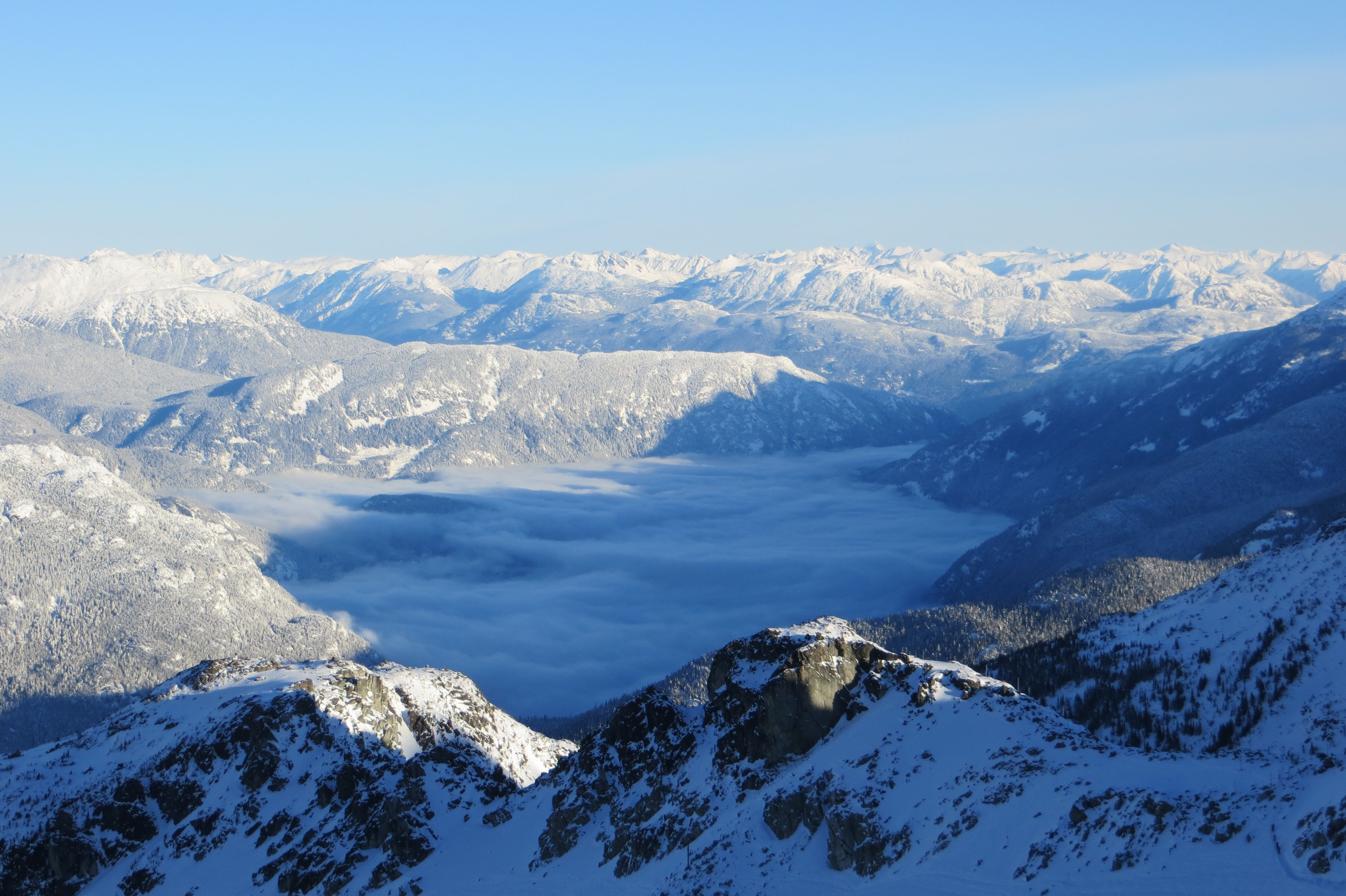
- Canadian Coast Range, Whistler, British Columbia

Highest point
- Peak: Mount Logan
- Elevation: 5,959 m (19,551 ft)

Dimensions
- Length: 3,800 mi (6,100 km)

Geography
- Countries: United States; Canada; Mexico
- Parent range: North American Cordillera

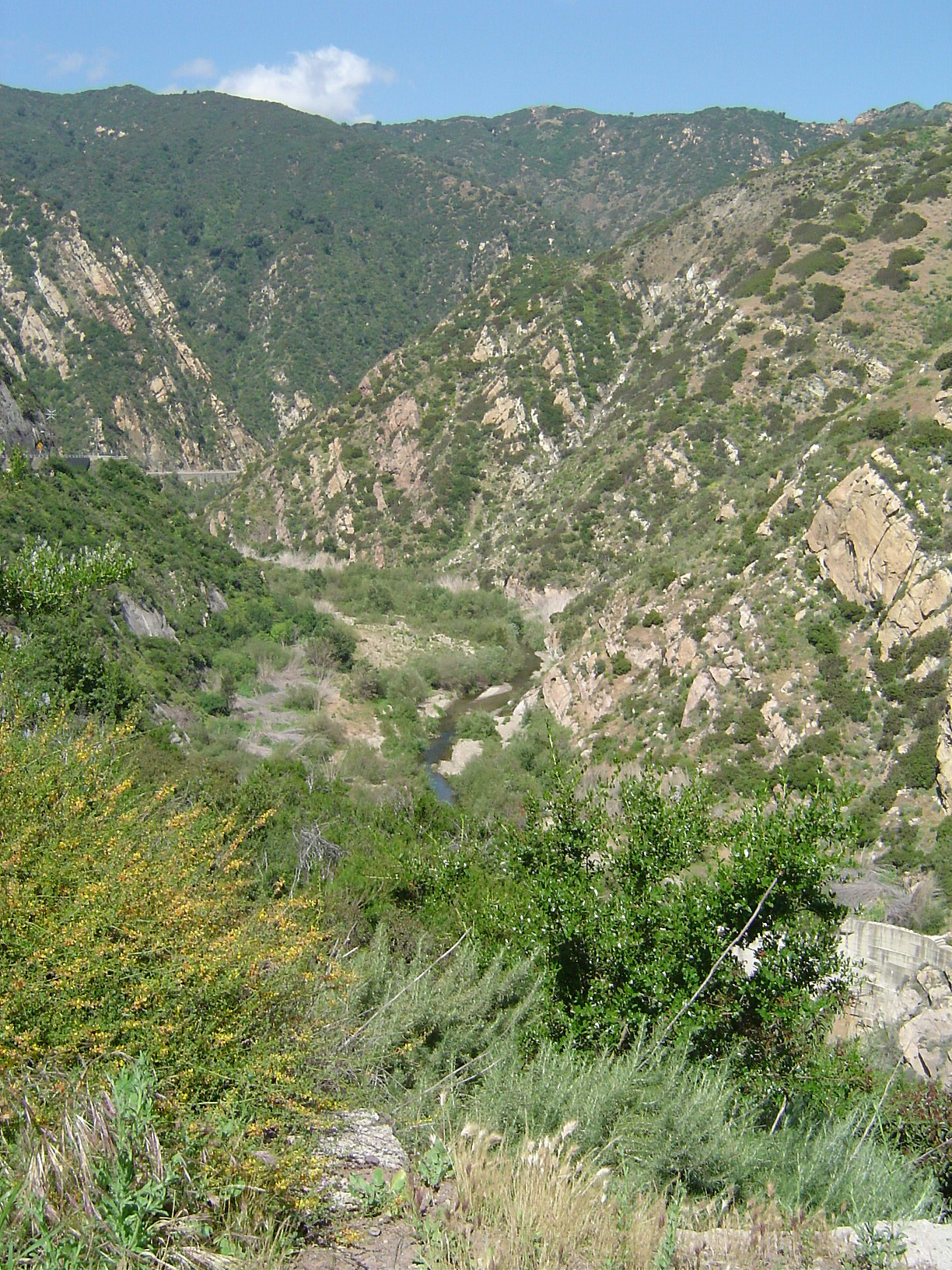
Malibu Canyon, Santa Monica Mountains

The Pacific Coast Ranges (officially gazetted as the Pacific Mountain System in the United States; French: chaînes côtières du Pacifique; Spanish: cadena costera del Pacífico) are the series of mountain ranges that stretch along the West Coast of North America from Alaska south to northern and central Mexico. Although they are commonly thought to be the westernmost mountain range of the continental United States and Canada, the geologically distinct Insular Mountains of Vancouver Island lie farther west.

The Pacific Coast Ranges are part of the North American Cordillera (sometimes known as the Western Cordillera, or in Canada, as the Pacific Cordillera and/or the Canadian Cordillera), which includes the Rocky Mountains, the Columbia Mountains, the Interior Mountains, the Interior Plateau, the Sierra Nevada, the Great Basin mountain ranges, and other ranges and various plateaus and basins.

The Pacific Coast Ranges designation, however, only applies to the Western System of the Western Cordillera, which comprises the Saint Elias Mountains, Coast Mountains, Insular Mountains, Olympic Mountains, Cascade Range, Oregon Coast Range, California Coast Ranges, Transverse Ranges, Peninsular Ranges, and the Sierra Madre Occidental.

== Other uses ==
The term Coast Range is used by the United States Geological Survey to refer only to the ranges south of the Strait of Juan de Fuca in Washington to the California-Mexico border, and to those west of Puget Sound, the Willamette Valley, and the Sacramento and San Joaquin valleys (the California Central Valley). That definition excludes the Sierra Nevada and Cascade Ranges, the Mojave (High), and Sonoran (Low) Deserts, i.e. the Pacific Border province. The same term is used informally in Canada to refer to the Coast Mountains and adjoining inland ranges such as the Hazelton Mountains, and sometimes also the Saint Elias Mountains.

== Geography ==
The character of the ranges varies considerably, from the record-setting tidewater glaciers in the ranges of Alaska, to the rugged Central and Southern California ranges, the Transverse Ranges and Peninsular Ranges, in the chaparral and woodlands eco-region with Oak Woodland, Chaparral shrub forest or Coastal sage scrub-covering them. The coastline is often seen dropping steeply into the sea with photogenic views. Along the British Columbia and Alaska coast, the mountains intermix with the sea in a complex maze of fjords, with thousands of islands. Off the Southern California coast the Channel Islands archipelago of the Santa Monica Mountains extends for 160 miles (260 km).

There are coastal plains at the mouths of rivers that have punched through the mountains spreading sediments, most notably at the Copper River in Alaska, the Fraser River in British Columbia, and the Columbia River between Washington and Oregon. In California: the Sacramento and San Joaquin Rivers' San Francisco Bay, the Santa Clara River's Oxnard Plain, the Los Angeles, San Gabriel, and Santa Ana Rivers' Los Angeles Basin – a coastal sediment-filled plain between the peninsular and transverse ranges with sediment in the basin up to 6 miles (10 km) deep, and the San Diego River's Mission Bay.

From the vicinity of San Francisco Bay north, it is common in winter for cool unstable air masses from the Gulf of Alaska to make landfall in one of the Coast Ranges, resulting in heavy precipitation, both as rain and snow, especially on their western slopes. The same Winter weather occurs with less frequency and precipitation in Southern California, with the mountains' western faces and peaks causing an eastward rainshadow that produces the arid desert regions.

Omitted from the list below, but often included is the Sierra Nevada, a major mountain range of eastern California that is separated by the Central Valley over much of its length from the California Coast Ranges and the Transverse Ranges.

== Geology ==
On the West coast of North America, the coast ranges and the coastal plain form the margin. Most of the land is made of terranes that have been accreted onto the margin. In the north, the insular belt is an accreted terrane, forming the margin. This belt extends from the Wrangellia Terrane in Alaska to the Chilliwack group of Canada.

A rupture in Rodinia 750 million years ago formed a passive margin in the eastern Pacific Northwest. The breakup of Pangea 200 million years ago began the westward movement of the North American plate, creating an active margin on the western continent. As the continent drifted West, terranes were accreted onto the west coast. The timing of the accretion of the insular belt is uncertain, although the closure did not occur until at least 115 million years ago. Other Mesozoic terranes that accreted onto the continent include the Klamath Mountains, the Sierra Nevada, and the Guerrero super-terrane of western Mexico. 90–80 million years ago the subducting Farallon plate split and formed the Kula Plate to the North. This formed an area in what is now Northern California, where the plates converged forming a Mélange. North of this was the Columbia Embayment, where the continental margin was east of the surrounding areas. Many of the major batholiths date from the late Cretaceous. As the Laramide Orogeny ended around 48 million years ago, the accretion of the Siletzia terrane began in the Pacific Northwest. This began the volcanic activity in the Cascadia subduction zone, forming the modern Cascade Range, and lasted into the Miocene. Events here may relate to the ignimbrite flare-up of the southern Basin and Range. As extension in the Basin and Range Province slowed by a change in North American Plate movement circa 7 to 8 Million years ago, rifting began on the Gulf of California.

Although many of the ranges do share a common geologic history, the Pacific Coast Ranges province is not defined by geology, but rather by geography. Many of the various ranges are composed of distinct forms of rock from many different periods of geological time from the Precambrian in parts of the Little San Bernardino Mountains to 10,000-year-old rock in the Cascade Range. For one example, the Peninsular Ranges, composed of Mesozoic batholitic rock, are geologically extremely different from the San Bernardino Mountains, composed of a mix of Precambrian metamorphic rock and Cenozoic sedimentary rock. However, both are considered part of the Pacific Coast Ranges due to their proximity and similar economic and social impact on surrounding communities.

== Major ranges ==
These are the members of the Pacific Coast Ranges, from north to south:

- Kenai Mountains, southern Alaska
- Chugach Mountains, southern Alaska
- Talkeetna Mountains, southern Alaska

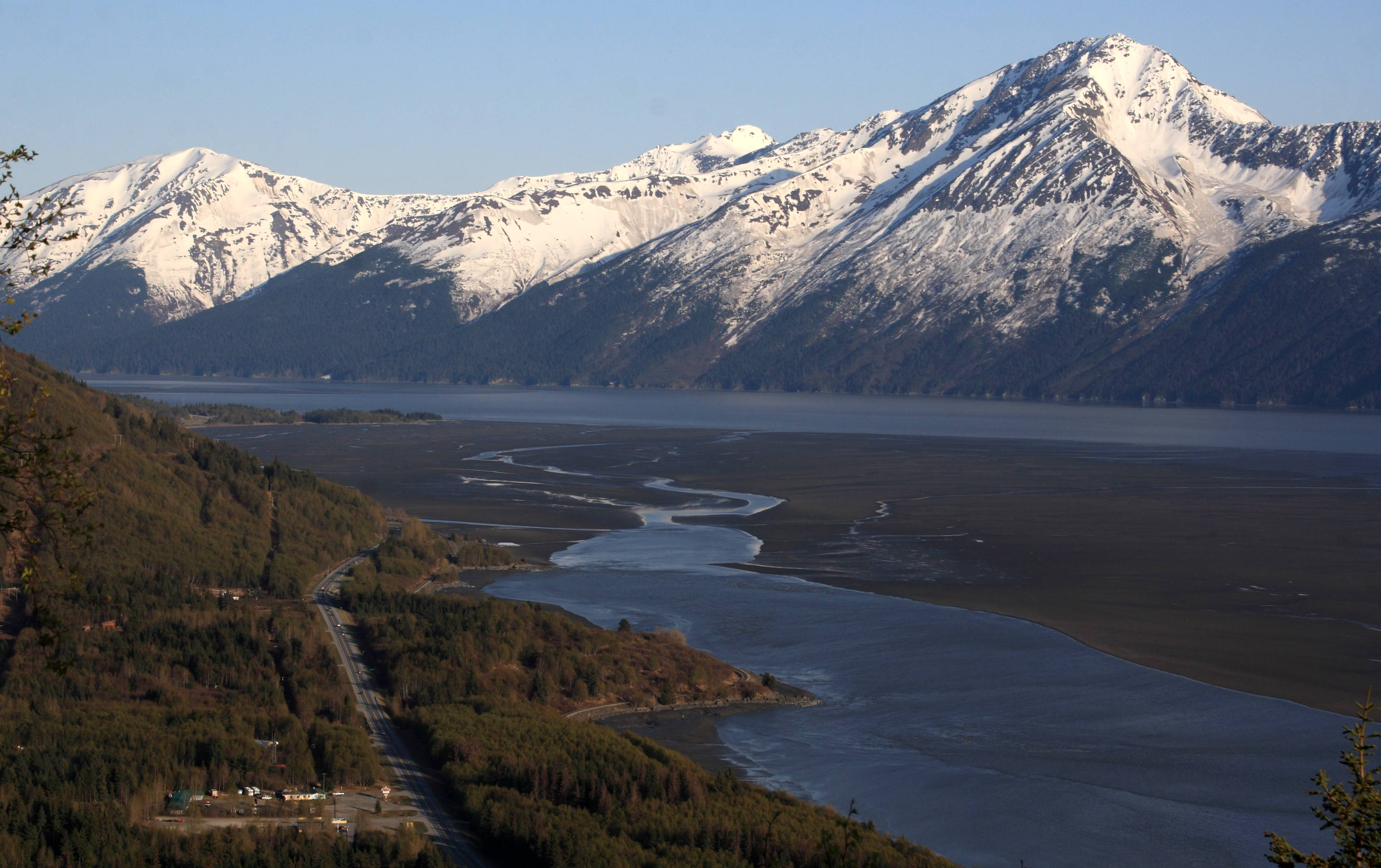
Kenai Mountains

- Yukon Ranges, Alaska, Yukon
  - Wrangell Mountains, southern Alaska
- Saint Elias Mountains, southern Alaska, southwestern Yukon, far northwestern British Columbia
  - Alsek Ranges
    - Fairweather Range
    - Takshanuk Mountains, Haines, Alaska-area. Between Chilkat and Chilkoot watersheds
- Coast Mountains
  - Boundary Ranges, southeastern Alaska, northwestern British Columbia
    - Cheja Range (southeast of Taku/Whiting Rivers)
    - Chechidla Range
    - Chutine Icefield
    - Adam Mountains
    - Ashington Range
    - Burniston Range
    - Dezadeash Range
    - Florence Range
    - Halleck Range
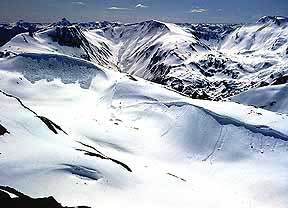
      Juneau Icefield
    - Juneau Icefield
    - Kakuhan Range
    - Lincoln Mountains
    - Longview Range
    - Peabody Mountains
    - Rousseau Range
    - Seward Mountains
    - Snowslide Range
    - Spectrum Range
    - Stikine Icecap
  - Kitimat Ranges BC North Coast
  - Pacific Ranges BC South & Central Coast
    - Rainbow Range northwest Chilcotin, also classifiable as part of the Interior Plateau
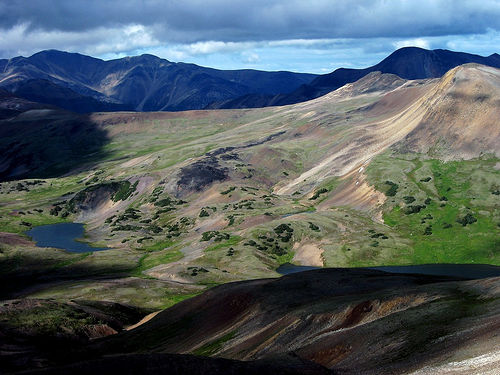
      Rainbow Ridge
    - Pantheon Range Homathko area
    - Niut Range Homathko area
    - Waddington Range Homathko area
    - Whitemantle Range Homathko area
    - Bendor Range
    - Garibaldi Ranges
    - Clendinning Range
    - Tantalus Range
    - Chilcotin Ranges
      - Dickson Range
      - Shulaps Range
      - Camelsfoot Range
    - Lillooet Ranges, (Fraser Canyon west bank)
      - Cantilever Range
      - Cayoosh Range
    - Douglas Ranges
    - Front Ranges (North Shore Mountains)
- Insular Mountains, British Columbia
  - Vancouver Island Ranges, British Columbia
  - Queen Charlotte Mountains, British Columbia
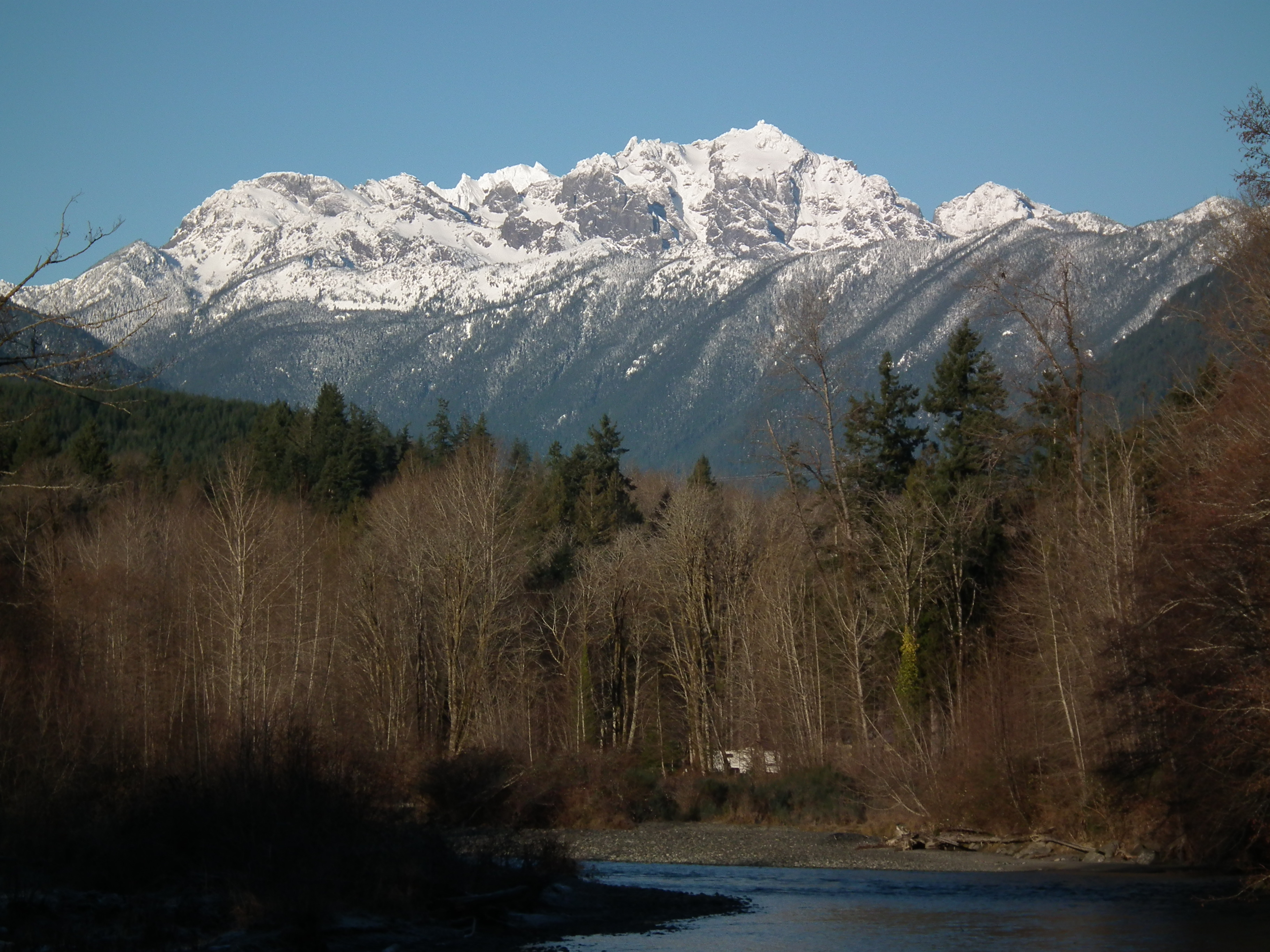
    Mt. Constance, Olympic Mountains
- Cascade Range, British Columbia (Fraser Canyon east bank), Washington, Oregon and California
- Olympic Mountains, Washington
- Willapa Hills
  - Black Hills
  - Doty Hills
- Oregon Coast Range, Oregon
  - Northern Oregon Coast Range
  - Central Oregon Coast Range
  - Southern Oregon Coast Range
- Calapooya Mountains, Oregon
- Klamath-Siskiyou, Oregon, Northern California
  - Klamath Mountains, Oregon, Northern California
  - Siskiyou Mountains, Oregon, Northern California
  - Trinity Alps and Salmon Mountains, Northern California
  - Yolla Bolly Mountains, Northern California
- Northern Coast Ranges, Northern California
  - King Range, Northern California
  - Mendocino Range, Northern California
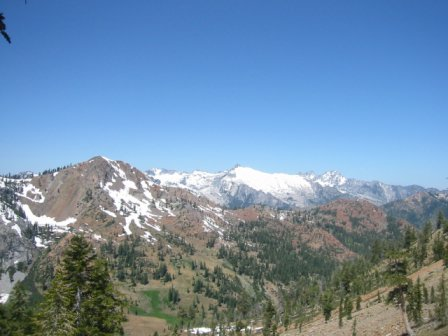
    Klamath Mountains
  - Mayacamas Mountains, Northern California
  - Marin Hills, Northern California, (including Mount Tamalpais)
- Central California Coast Ranges, Central California
  - Santa Cruz Mountains, Central California
  - Diablo Range, Central California
  - Gabilan Range, Central California
  - Santa Lucia Range, Central California
  - Temblor Range, Central California
  - Caliente Range, Central California
- Transverse Ranges, Southern California
  - Sierra Madre Mountains, Southern California
  - Sierra Pelona Mountains, Southern California
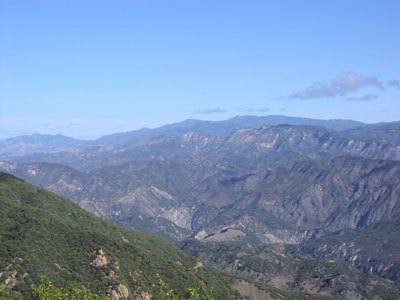
    San Rafael Mountains
  - San Emigdio Mountains, Southern California
  - San Rafael Mountains, Southern California
  - Santa Ynez Mountains, Southern California
  - Tehachapi Mountains, Southern California
  - Topatopa Mountains, Southern California
  - Santa Susana Mountains, Southern California
  - Simi Hills, Southern California
  - Santa Monica Mountains, Southern California
  - Chalk Hills, Southern California
  - San Gabriel Mountains, Southern California
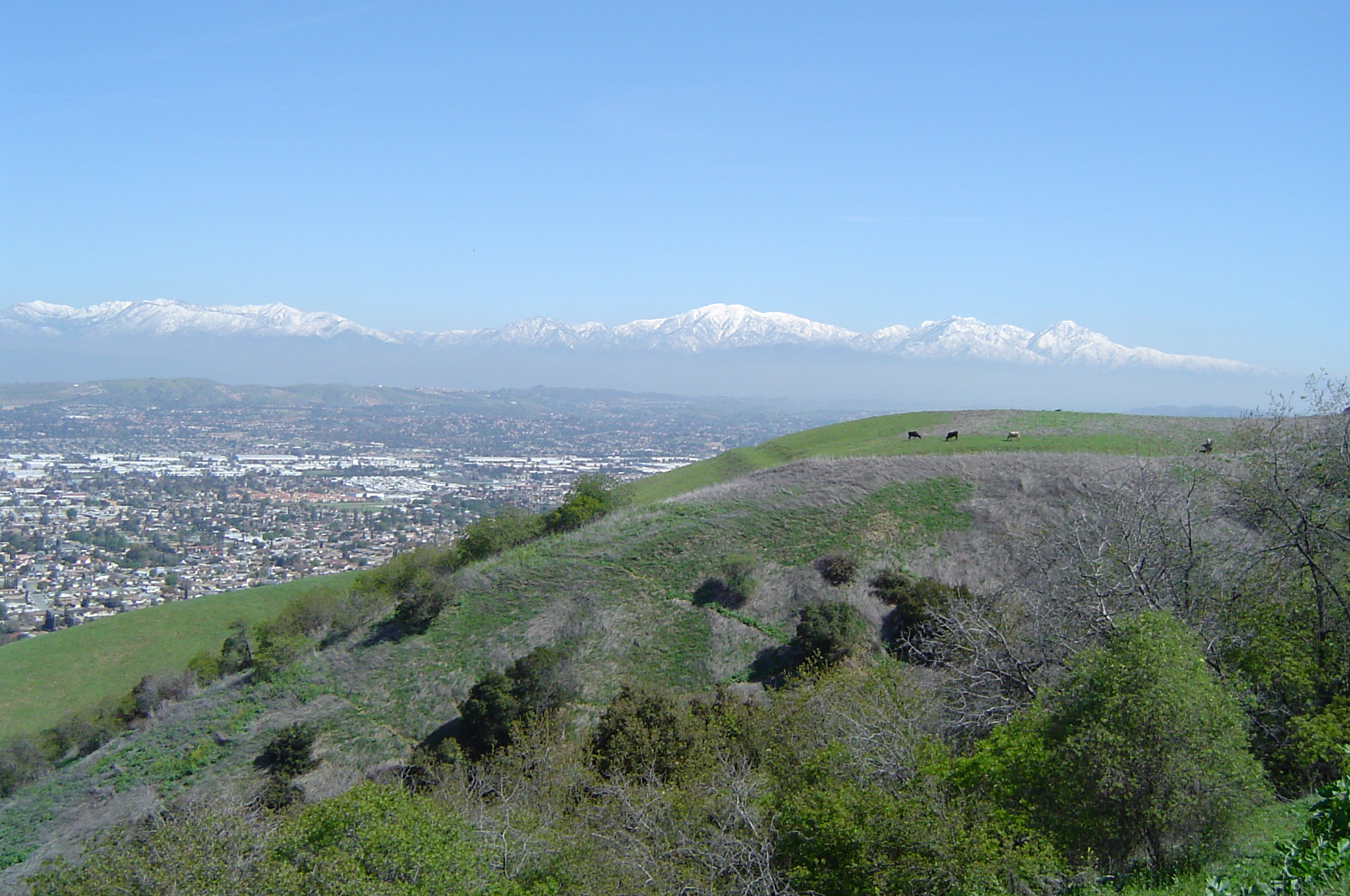
    Puente Hills
  - San Rafael Hills, Southern California
  - Puente Hills, Southern California
  - San Bernardino Mountains, Southern California
  - Little San Bernardino Mountains, Southern California
- Peninsular Ranges, Southern California and Mexico
  - Santa Ana Mountains, Southern California
  - Chino Hills, Southern California
  - San Jacinto Mountains, Southern California
  - Palomar Mountain Range, Southern California
  - Laguna Mountains, Southern California
  - Sierra Juarez, Northern Baja California, Mexico
  - Sierra San Pedro Martir, Central Baja California, Mexico
  - Sierra de San Borja, Central Baja California, Mexico
  - Sierra de San Francisco, Central Baja California, Mexico
  - Sierra de Guadalupe cave paintings, Central Baja California, Mexico
  - Sierra de la Giganta, Southern Baja California, Mexico
  - Sierra de la Laguna, Southern Baja California, Mexico
- Sierra Madre Occidental, Northwestern Mexico

== Major icefields ==
These are not named as ranges, but amount to the same thing. The Pacific Coast Ranges are home to the largest temperate-latitude icefields in the world.

- Harding Icefield
- Sargent Icefield
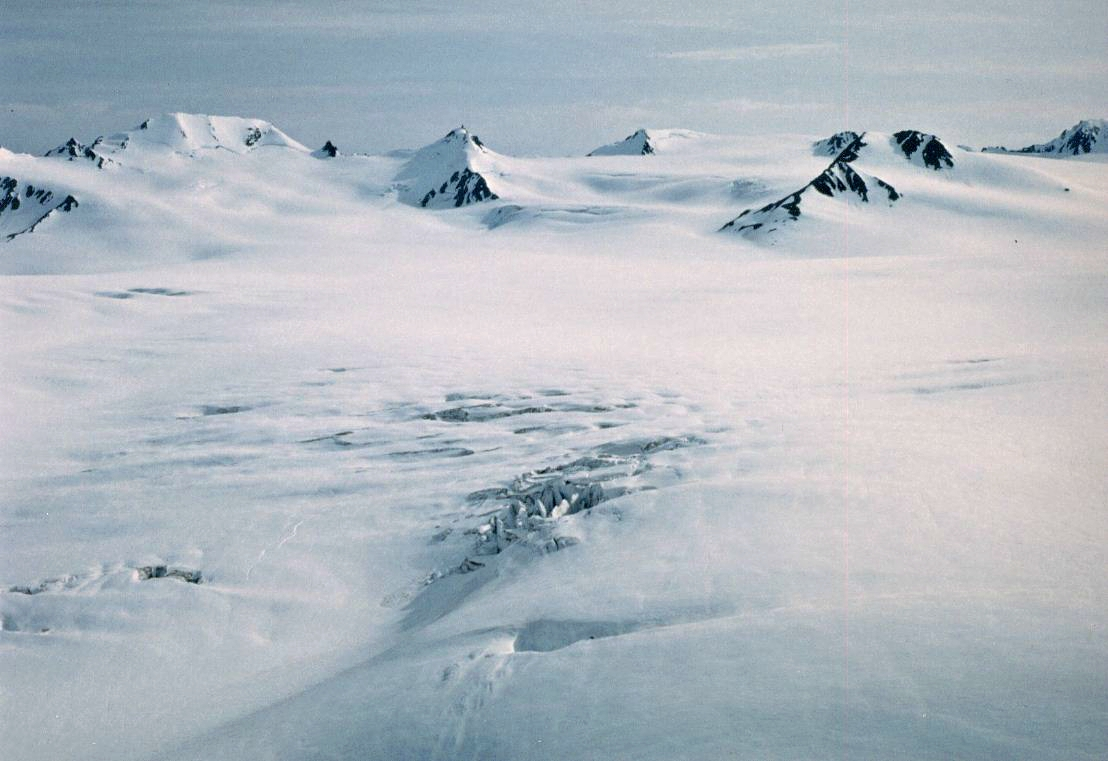
  Harding Icefield
- Bagley Icefield
- Kluane Icefields
- Juneau Icefield
- Stikine Icecap
- Ha-Iltzuk Icefield (Silverthrone Glacier)
- Monarch Icefield
- Waddington Icefield
- Homathko Icefield
- Lillooet Icecap (Lillooet Crown)
- Pemberton Icefield

Only the largest icefields are listed above; smaller icefields may be listed on the various range pages. Formerly unnamed icefields are not listed.

== See also ==
- List of Pacific Coast Ranges topics
- Coast Range (ecoregion)
- California Coast Ranges (geomorphic province)
- Coast Ranges (geomorphic province)
- United States physiographic regions
