= Chutine River =

River in British Columbia

- Mouth of the Chutine River

Location
- Country: Canada
- Province: British Columbia
- District: Cassiar Land District

Physical characteristics
- Source: Cheja Range
  - location: Boundary Ranges
  - coordinates: 57°58′42″N 132°28′57″W
  - elevation: 1,405 m (4,610 ft)
- Mouth: Stikine River
  - coordinates: 57°39′9″N 131°37′58″W
  - elevation: 117 m (384 ft)
- Length: 95 km (59 mi)
- Basin size: 2,629 km^{2} (1,015 sq mi),
- Discharge
  - average: 140 m^{3}/s (4,900 cu ft/s)

Basin features
- Tributaries
  - left: Piggly Creek, Ugly Creek, Wimpson Creek, Barrington River, Jimjack Creek, Wriggle Creek
  - right: Dirst Creek, Triumph Creek, Pendant Creek, Conover Creek
- Topo map: NTS104G12 Chutine River

The Chutine River (formerly Clearwater River), is a major right bank tributary of the Stikine River in northwestern part of the province of British Columbia, Canada. It is located just east of boundary between Southeast Alaska and British Columbia. From its source in the Boundary Ranges of the Coast Mountains the Chutine River flows south and east for about 95 km (59 mi) to empty into the Stikine River at the former settlement of Chutine, near the settlement of Jacksons.

The Chutine River's drainage basin covers 2,629 km^{2} (1,015 sq mi). The river's mean annual discharge is estimated at 140 m^{3}/s (4,900 cu ft/s), with most of the flow occurring between May and October. The Chutine watershed's land cover is classified as 30.2% barren, 27.4% snow/glacier, 22.6% conifer forest, 9.9% herbaceous, 8.9% shrubland, and small amounts of other cover. The mouth of the Chutine River is located about 40 km (25 mi) southwest of the settlement of Telegraph Creek, 180 km (110 mi) southeast of Juneau, Alaska, about 380 km (240 mi) north of Prince Rupert, British Columbia, and about 695 km (432 mi) northwest of Prince George, British Columbia.

The name "Chutine" comes from an indigenous word meaning "half-people", as in half-Tahltan, half-Tlingit.

The Chutine River's drainage basin lies within the asserted traditional territory of the Tahltan First Nations people.

== Geography ==
The source of the Chutine River is close to the sources of the Sheslay River, Samotua River, Barrington River, and the South Whiting River.

The Chutine River originates in the mountains and glaciers of the Cheja Range, part of the Boundary Ranges near the border of British Columbia and Alaska. It flows south, through Chutine Lake, collecting many tributary streams. After exiting Chutine Lake the Chutine River flows southeast and east. It is joined by many tributary streams including Dirst Creek, Triumph Creek, Pendant Creek, and Conover Creek from the south, and Piggly Creek, Ugly Creek, Wimpson Creek, Jimjack Creek, and Wriggle Creek from the north.

As it near the Stikine River it is joined from the north by its largest tributary, the Barrington River. After the Barrington confluence the Chutine flows east and south between the Tahltan Highland and the Sawback Range, before emptying into the Stikine River.

Major named peaks in or along the watershed divides of the Chutine drainage include Owens Peak, Sheppard Peak, Chutine Peak, Mount Ratz, Mount Kitchener, Mount Barrington, Cutcone Mountain, Mount Conover, Cuteye Mountain, Hamlin Mountain, Mount Insley, Circle Mountain, and Valhalla Mountain. The area is highly glaciated.

For much of its course, the Chutine River is braided, with fluvioglacial features resulting from the retreating glaciers of the area.

== See also ==
- List of rivers of British Columbia
