= Seward Mountain =

Seward Mountain or Mountains may refer to:

- Seward Mountains (Alaska), a mountain in Alaska
- Seward Mountain (Montana), a mountain in Montana
- Seward Mountains (New York), a mountain range in New York
  - Seward Mountain (New York), a mountain located in the Seward Mountains
