= Mount Queena =

Mountain in Alaska, U.S.

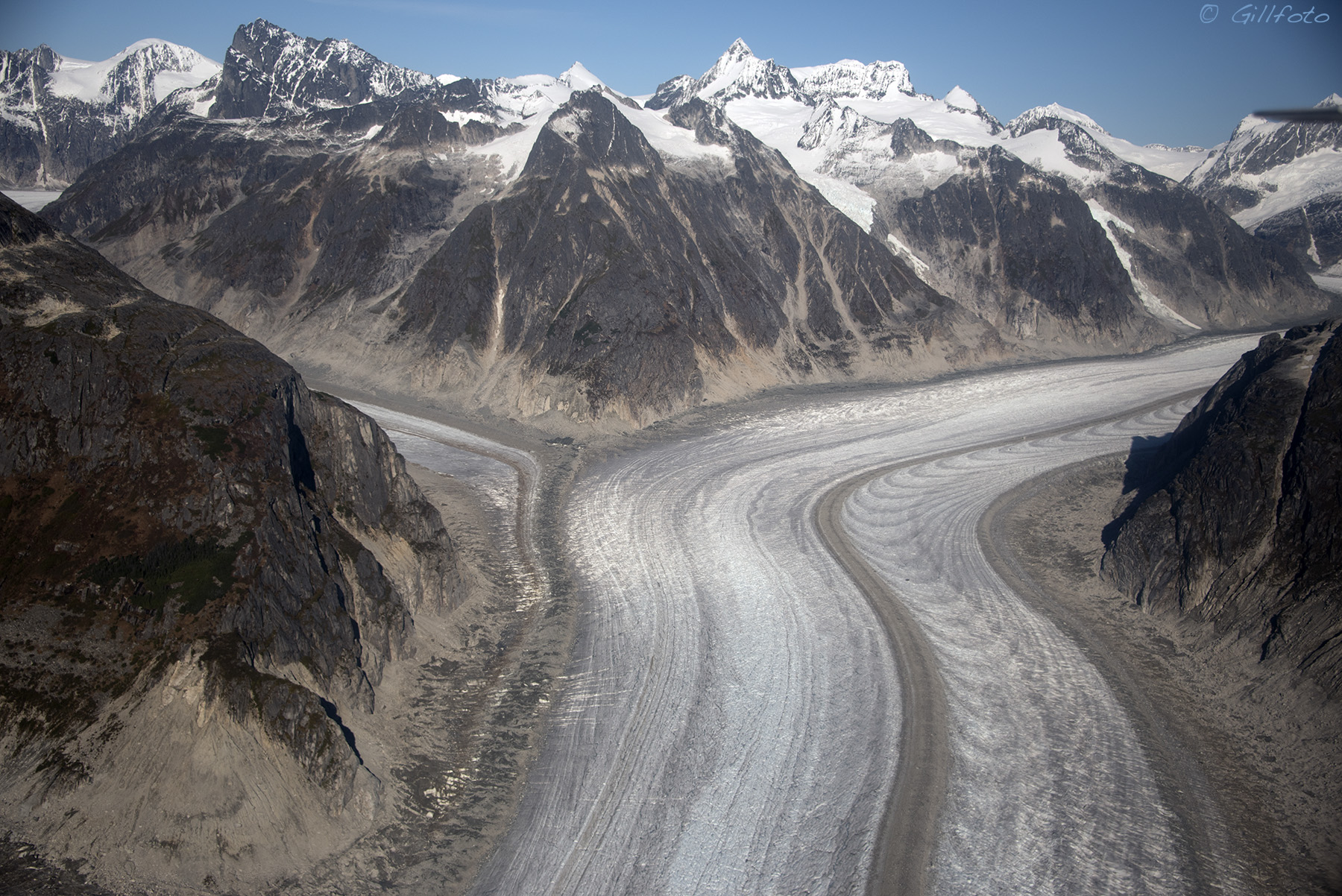
- Mt. Queena (right of center) from southwest

Highest point
- Elevation: 7,620+ ft (2,320+ m)
- Prominence: 2,320 ft (710 m)
- Parent peak: Mount Bressler
- Isolation: 2.93 mi (4.72 km)
- Coordinates: 58°51′46″N 134°20′24″W

Geography
- Location within Alaska
- Interactive map of Mount Queena
- Location: Tongass National Forest; Juneau Borough; Alaska, United States
- Parent range: Coast Mountains; Boundary Ranges; Juneau Icefield
- Topo map: USGS Juneau D-2

Mount Queena is a 7,620+ ft (2,320+ m) elevation mountain summit located in the Boundary Ranges of the Coast Mountains, in the U.S. state of Alaska. This unofficially named peak is situated on the Juneau Icefield, 39 mi (63 km) north of Juneau, 2.7 mi (4 km) west of the Canada–United States border, and 5 mi (8 km) northeast of Mount Blachnitzky, on land managed by Tongass National Forest. Although modest in elevation, relief is significant since the east aspect of the mountain rises over 3,200 feet above the Gilkey Glacier in less than one mile. The nearest higher neighbor is Mount Ogilvie, 2.5 mi (4 km) to the east.

== Climate ==
Based on the Köppen climate classification, Mount Queena has a subarctic climate with cold, snowy winters, and cool summers. Most weather fronts originate in the Pacific Ocean, and travel east toward the Coast Mountains where they are forced upward by the range (Orographic lift), causing them to drop their moisture in the form of rain or snowfall. As a result, the Coast Mountains experience high precipitation, especially during the winter months in the form of snowfall. Temperatures can drop below −20 °C with wind chill factors below −30 °C. The months June and July offer the most favorable weather for viewing this rarely climbed peak.

== Gallery ==
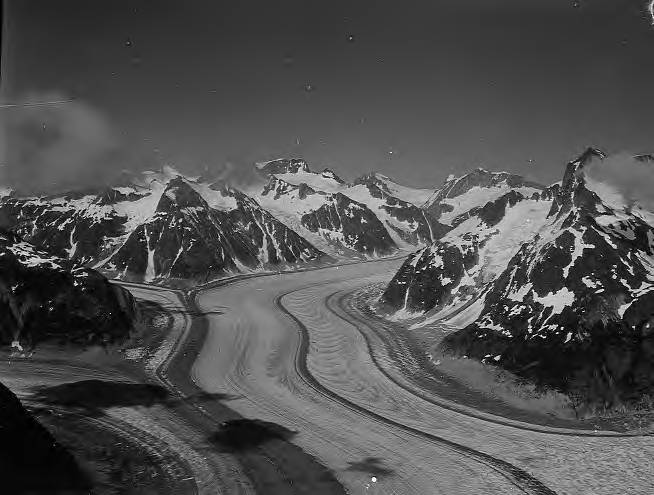
Mount Queena centered in the distance, with Mount Blachnitzky on right (1955)

== See also ==
- Geospatial summary of the High Peaks/Summits of the Juneau Icefield
- Geography of Alaska
