= Porcupine River (disambiguation) =

Porcupine River may refer to:

- Porcupine River, in Alaska, United States and Yukon, Canada
- Porcupine River (British Columbia), in British Columbia, Canada
- Porcupine River (Ontario), in Ontario, Canada
