= Mount Blachnitzky =

Mountain in Juneau, Alaska

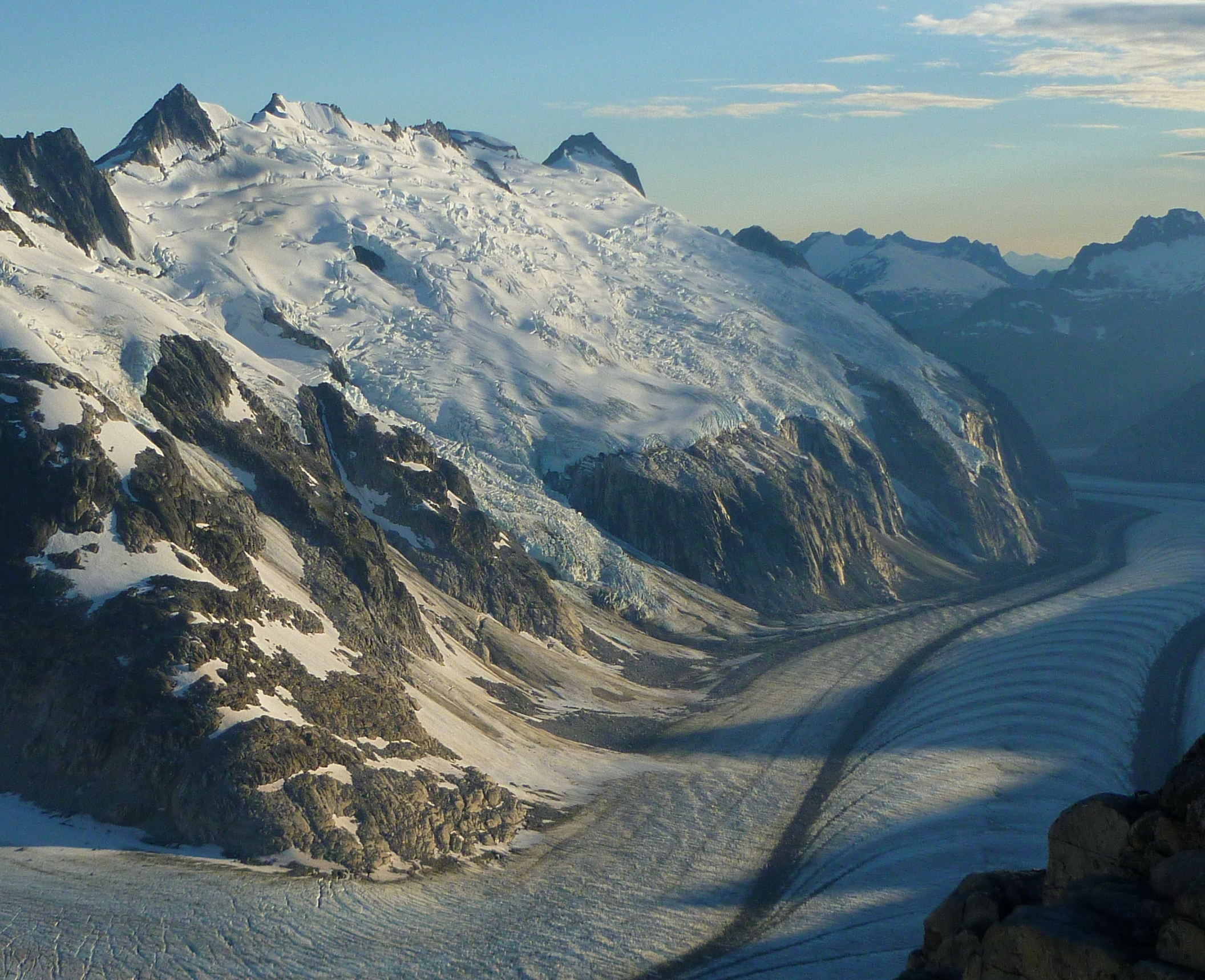
- Mt. Blachnitzky from the northeast

Highest point
- Elevation: 6,552 ft (1,997 m)
- Prominence: 602 ft (183 m)
- Isolation: 3.7 mi (6.0 km)
- Coordinates: 58°47′48″N 134°23′44″W

Geography
- Location within Alaska
- Interactive map of Mount Blachnitzky
- Location: Tongass National Forest; Juneau Borough; Alaska, United States
- Parent range: Boundary Ranges
- Topo map: USGS Juneau D-2

Climbing
- First ascent: 2004, Keith Daellenbach and party
- Easiest route: class 3 south ridge

Mount Blachnitzky is a 6,552 ft (2,000 m) mountain summit in the city and borough of Juneau, Alaska, United States. It is a part of the Boundary Ranges of the Coast Mountains in western North America. It is located between Gilkey Glacier and Avalanche Canyon; it is named after Klaus Blachnitzky (1921-1988), a surveyor, geodesist, and explorer of the Juneau Icefield. Blachnitzky was the head surveyor for the Juneau Icefield Research Program. Much of his work was conducted in the vicinity of this summit. In August 1988, having completed almost two seasons instructing student surveyors and scientists in the science and practice of terrestrial field surveying and geodesy, he was killed when he slipped from a rock cleaver on the slope of Vaughan Lewis Glacier. The site of his death is four miles from the mountain named in his honor. In 2004, four climbers made a memorial climb of the previously unclimbed summit and left surveying mementos of Blachnitzky's life at the peak. The first ascent was made on June 30, 2004 by Scott McGee, Keith Daellenbach, Charles Daellenbach, and Fred Skemp III, via the southwest cirque/south ridge. The mountain's name was officially adopted in 2007 by the U.S. Board on Geographic Names.

== Climate ==
Based on the Köppen climate classification, Mount Blachnitzky has a subarctic climate with cold, snowy winters, and mild summers.. Most weather fronts originate in the Pacific Ocean, and travel east toward the Coast Mountains where they are forced upward by the range (orographic lift), causing them to drop their moisture in the form of rain or snowfall. As a result, the Coast Mountains experience high precipitation, especially during the winter months in the form of snowfall. Temperatures can drop below −20 °C with wind chill factors below −30 °C. The month of July offers the most favorable weather for viewing and climbing Mount Blachnitzky.

== Gallery ==
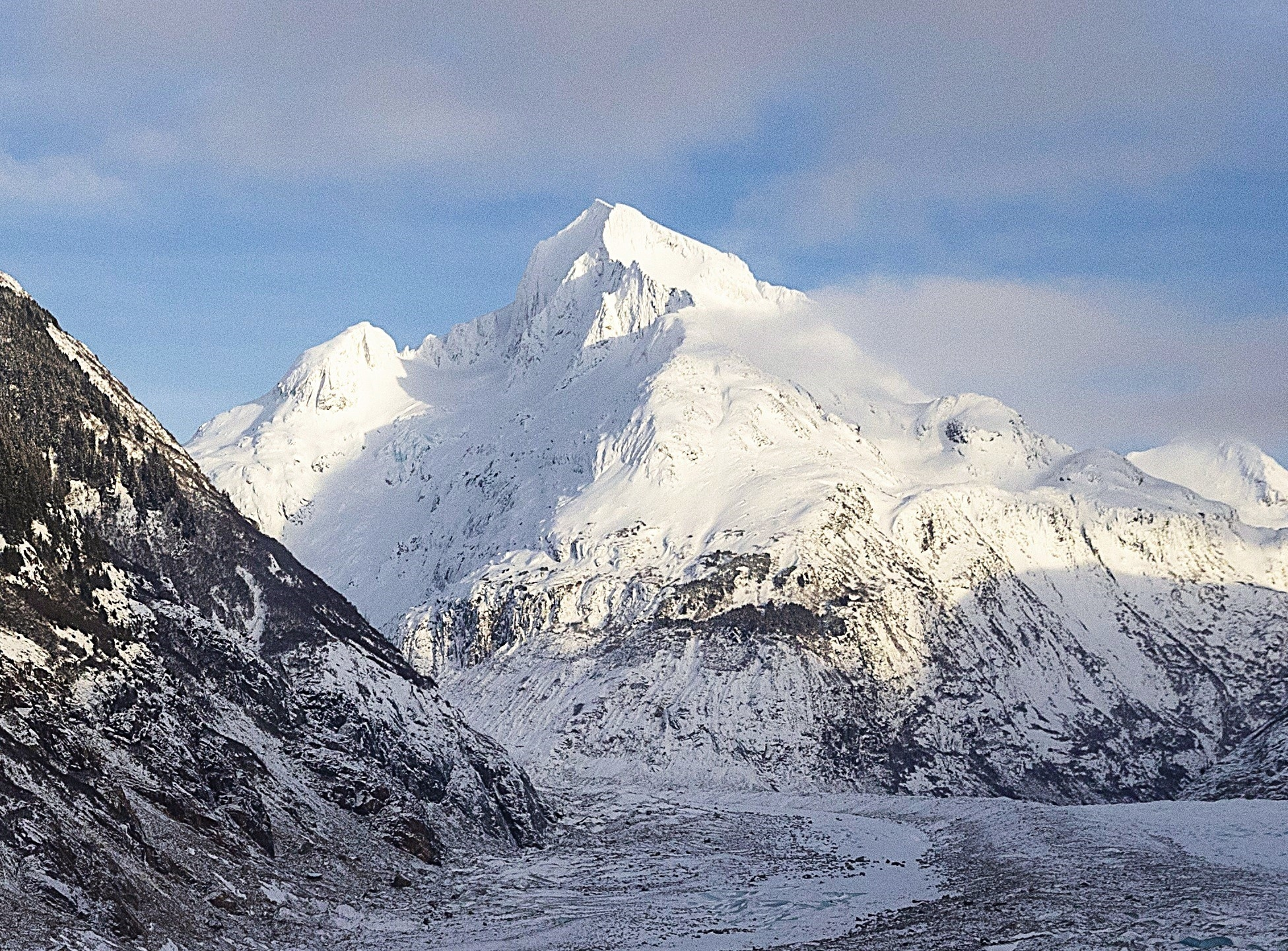
Aerial view from the west

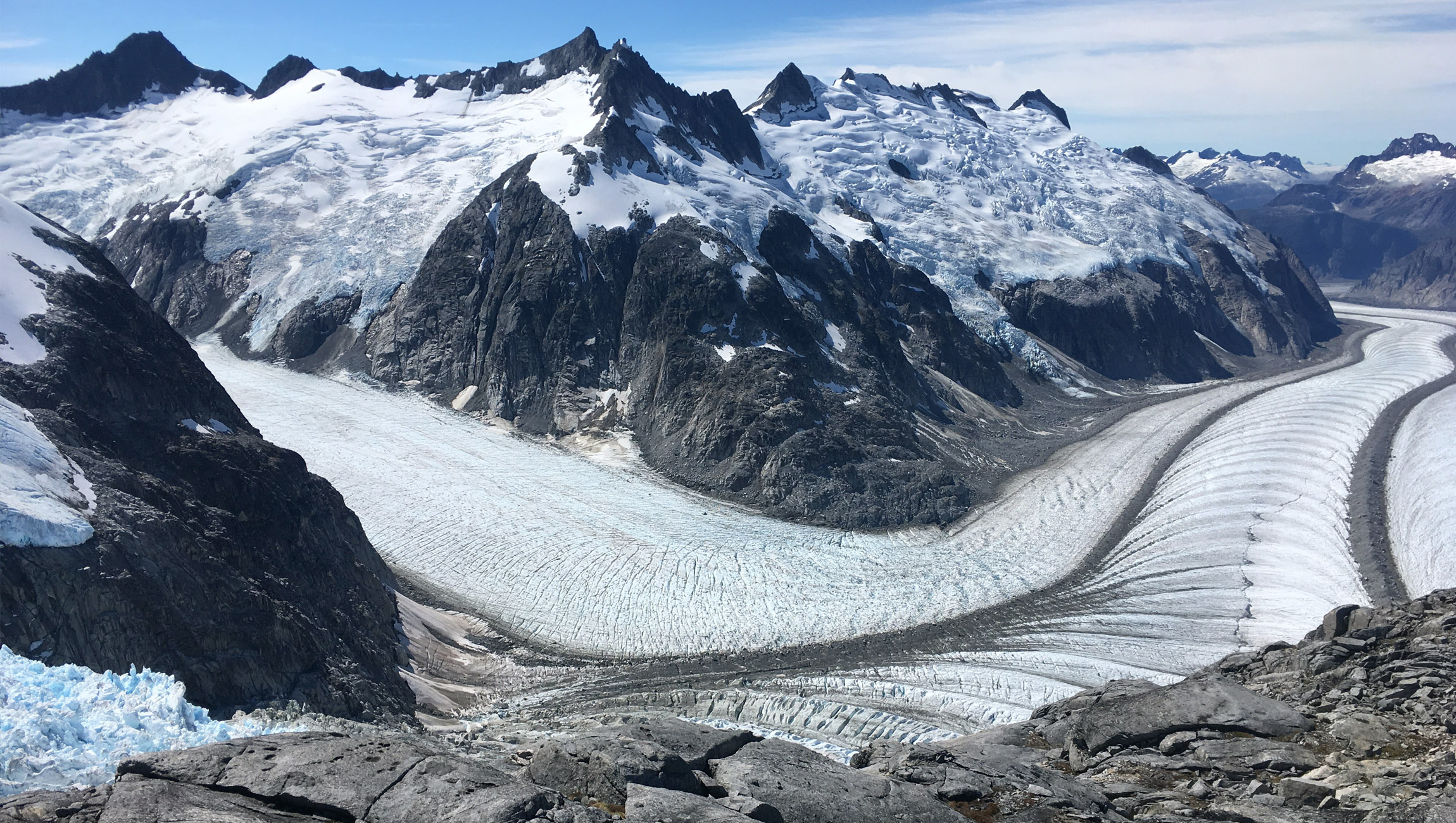
Gilkey Glacier. Mt. Blachnitzky to right of center

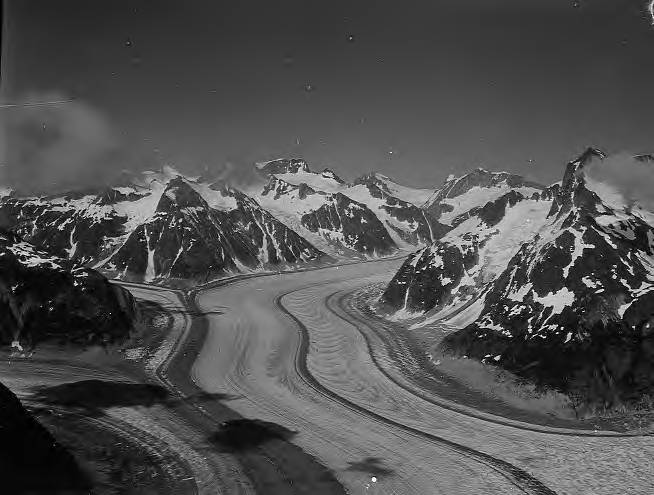
Gilkey Glacier, Mt. Blachnitzky to right, Mt. Queena centered, circa 1955

== See also ==
- Geospatial summary of the High Peaks/Summits of the Juneau Icefield
