= 1943 Gillam plane crash =

1943 aviation accident and survival ordeal in Alaska

Accident
- Date: January 5, 1943
- Summary: Left-engine failure in severe weather; contributing navigational and radio-aid issues; and crash into mountainous terrain
- Site: Mountainous terrain about 30 miles east of Ketchikan, Alaska, near Boca de Quadra, Territory of Alaska, United States

Aircraft
- Aircraft type: Lockheed 10-B Electra
- Operator: Morrison-Knudsen Construction Company
- Registration: NC14915
- Flight origin: Boeing Field, Seattle, Washington
- Stopover: Annette Island Army Airfield, Territory of Alaska
- Destination: Anchorage, Territory of Alaska
- Occupants: 6
- Passengers: 5
- Crew: 1
- Fatalities: 2
- Injuries: 4
- Survivors: 4

The 1943 Gillam plane crash was an aviation accident and wilderness survival ordeal in southeast Alaska involving a Morrison-Knudsen Construction Company Lockheed 10-B Electra, registration NC14915, piloted by Alaska aviator Harold Gillam. The aircraft crashed on January 5, 1943, during a flight from Boeing Field in Seattle to Annette Island Army Airfield in the Territory of Alaska, while en route to Anchorage. The aircraft suffered left-engine failure in severe weather and crashed in mountainous terrain about 30 miles east of Ketchikan, Alaska, near Boca de Quadra.

All six occupants initially survived. Passenger Susan Winch Batzer died from injuries about 48 hours later. Gillam later left the wreck site to seek help and died of exposure and freezing. The four surviving passengers—Joseph H. Tippets, Percy "Sandy" Cutting, Robert Gebo and Dewey Metzdorf—remained lost in winter conditions until Tippets and Cutting reached tidewater and were rescued on February 3, 1943. Gebo and Metzdorf were rescued from an inland camp on February 7 by civilian guides and U.S. Coast Guard personnel.

The accident became a prominent Alaska aviation survival story because of Gillam's reputation as a bush pilot, the length of the survivors' ordeal, and the subsequent Coast Guard rescue effort.

== Background ==
Gillam was one of Alaska's best-known early bush pilots. Later accounts describe him as a pilot whose reputation was built on flying in weather and terrain that other pilots avoided. At the time of the accident, he was chief pilot for Morrison-Knudsen's Alaska operations. The Civil Aeronautics Board reported that Gillam held a commercial pilot certificate for single- and multi-engine aircraft, landplanes, seaplanes and instrument flying, and had accumulated approximately 7,412 flight hours, including about 757 hours in the type of aircraft involved in the crash.

The accident occurred during World War II, after Japanese forces had occupied Attu and Kiska in the Aleutian Islands. The Annette Island airfield was part of a military airfield chain linking Seattle with Alaska and the Aleutians, and Morrison-Knudsen was one of the civilian contractors involved in building wartime facilities in Alaska.

== Aircraft and occupants ==
The aircraft was a ten-passenger Lockheed 10-B Electra, registration NC14915, powered by two Wright engines and owned by Morrison-Knudsen Construction Company, which maintained a branch office in Anchorage. The flight was a cross-country commercial flight from Boeing Field to Annette Island, with Anchorage as the intended final destination.

Name	Role or occupation	Outcome
Harold Gillam	Pilot; Morrison-Knudsen chief pilot	Survived crash; died of exposure after leaving wreck site
Susan Winch Batzer	Newly hired Civil Aeronautics Administration employee traveling to Anchorage	Died from crash injuries
Robert Gebo	Morrison-Knudsen construction supervisor; seated in copilot's seat	Survived
Percy "Sandy" Cutting	Morrison-Knudsen mechanic	Survived
Dewey Metzdorf	Anchorage Hotel owner/operator	Survived
Joseph H. Tippets	Civil Aeronautics Administration aviation employee based in Anchorage	Survived

== Accident ==
Gillam departed Boeing Field at approximately 1:27 p.m. on January 5, 1943, after receiving clearance and weather information for the flight to Annette Island. According to the CAB report, Gillam initially flew at lower altitude under broken clouds, then climbed to about 9,000 feet and later entered an overcast at about 5:10 p.m., continuing on instruments.

The CAB found that Gillam and Gebo, who was seated in the copilot's seat and assisting with navigation, believed they had picked up the Annette radio range and were near their destination. At about 6:25 p.m., after a series of heading changes and while at approximately 7,000 feet, the left engine stopped. Gillam called the Ketchikan radio station and advised that the left engine had failed and that he thought the aircraft was in trouble. Later aviation-history accounts quote the message as "one engine conked out, expect trouble."

The aircraft then entered a violent downdraft, and Gillam abandoned further radio communication while attempting to recover control. The Electra broke out beneath a ragged overcast at about 2,500 feet, headed north and parallel to a mountain ridge. Gillam shut down the right engine, aimed toward a clearing and pulled the aircraft into a stalled attitude for a crash landing. The right wing sheared two tall trees, the aircraft turned about 90 degrees to the right, struck the ground on the stub of the broken right wing and lower fuselage, and came to rest upright.

The official report placed the crash at approximately 6:30 p.m. on a heavily timbered mountainside about 30 miles east of Ketchikan, at an elevation of approximately 2,400 feet above sea level. A March 1943 account in The Cordova Daily Times, based on Tippets's recollections, similarly described the aircraft as having crashed into a mountaintop east of Ketchikan during a snowstorm and Alaskan night.

== Injuries and first days ==
All six occupants survived the initial impact. The survivors' injuries varied substantially. The CAB reported that Batzer was critically injured and died about 48 hours after the accident for lack of medical attention. Gebo and Metzdorf were seriously injured; Tippets and Cutting received minor injuries; and Gillam was apparently uninjured in the crash. Tippets later stated that Gebo had a broken leg and arm, Metzdorf had a broken collarbone and broken ribs, and Batzer's hand had been nearly severed when she was pinned in the wreckage.

The survivors improvised shelter near the wreckage and recovered limited food and equipment from the aircraft. TIGHAR's 2004 account, relying on contemporaneous sources, stated that the aircraft contained an axe, knife, two sleeping bags, signal flares, a .22 rifle with ammunition, fuel, beans, corned beef, sardines, hardtack, bouillon cubes, coffee, tea and chocolate.

Search aircraft passed through the general region, but the wreckage and survivors were not seen. According to later accounts, the survivors initially believed they were on or near Annette Island, when in fact they were much farther east on the mainland side of the region.

== Search and survival ordeal ==
Search efforts began after the aircraft failed to arrive. The search was hampered by winter weather, difficult terrain and uncertainty over the aircraft's position. According to the CAB report, an extensive air, land and water search covered large areas east and south of Ketchikan and into British Columbia; after about three weeks, the party was presumed lost and the search was abandoned.

Gillam left the wreck site several days after the accident to seek help. Tippets later said that Gillam left with matches, light emergency rations and a sleeping bag, believing he could reach civilization. Gillam did not return. His remains were found on February 6, 1943, on the shore of Boca de Quadra Inlet, about seven miles from the crash scene.

The remaining survivors stayed near the aircraft and later moved to a lower camp. Cutting and Tippets eventually left Gebo and Metzdorf at the camp and attempted to reach tidewater. They traveled through deep snow, brush and steep terrain until they reached Weasel Cove on Boca de Quadra. They found an abandoned cabin, ate small amounts of food found there, attempted to repair a damaged boat and maintained a signal fire along the shore.

== Rescue ==
On February 3, 1943, Cutting and Tippets encountered a U.S. Coast Guard patrol boat in Weasel Cove on Boca de Quadra Inlet. TIGHAR identifies the boat as CGR-232, also referred to in later accounts as the Tuscan. The two men were taken to Ketchikan, where they reported that Gebo and Metzdorf remained alive at an inland camp.

A rescue effort was then organized from Ketchikan using Coast Guard personnel and local guides. Gebo and Metzdorf were located alive and were brought out on February 7 by civilian guides and Coast Guard personnel. Later accounts describe the final evacuation as involving improvised sleds or toboggans and movement over a ridge to Badger Bay, where the Coast Guard cutter McLane had moved through ice to support the rescue.

The four surviving passengers were hospitalized in Ketchikan. Tippets returned to Anchorage later in February 1943.

== Investigation ==
Because no Civil Aeronautics Board air safety investigator was available in the Territory of Alaska, the wreck-site investigation was conducted by E. S. Gull, a senior aeronautical inspector of the Civil Aeronautics Administration stationed in Anchorage. The CAB adopted its report on August 25, 1943.

The investigation found that Gillam had received weather information before departure, including warnings about overcast conditions, precipitation, icing and winds aloft. The report stated that the Fraser River aeronautical chart Gillam used was out of date and showed the Annette Island radio range incorrectly. It also noted that Gillam had invited error by labeling the chart in true rather than magnetic headings, and that no attempt had been made to contact ground stations by radio to verify radio-range headings or report the flight's progress.

The CAB concluded that the stoppage of the left engine from an undetermined cause in extremely rough weather and over hazardous terrain was the primary cause of the accident. It identified as contributing factors Gillam's failure to carry an up-to-date aeronautical chart and his failure to use available radio aids to accurately establish the aircraft's position while flying on instruments.

A 2004 TIGHAR analysis emphasized the same navigational issues and suggested that Gillam may have been homing on the Ketchikan beacon while believing he was using the Annette beacon. The article also noted that forecast westerly winds aloft may have contributed to eastward drift, placing the aircraft farther from Annette than Gillam realized.

== Later accounts ==
The crash was later recounted in books, aviation-history articles and press coverage. In 1968, FAA Horizons published a first-person account by Joseph H. Tippets titled "They Cheated Icy Death." The editor's note identified Tippets as FAA Associate Administrator for Personnel and Training and described the article as part of a series of true adventures of FAA employees.

John M. Tippets, Joseph Tippets's son, published Hearts of Courage: The Gillam Plane Crash and the Amazing True Story of Survival in the Frozen Wilderness of Alaska in 2008. The book was reviewed in Air Power History in 2009. The story was also covered by the Deseret News in 2009 and by the Anchorage Daily News in 2013. The American Aviation Historical Society Journal published a detailed article on the crash and rescue in 2020.

== See also ==
- Bush flying
- Lockheed Model 10 Electra
- Misty Fiords National Monument
