= Chutine Peak =

Mountain in the country of Canada

- Location within British Columbia
- Interactive map of Chutine Peak

Highest point
- Elevation: 2,910 m (9,550 ft)
- Prominence: 1,765 m (5,791 ft)
- Parent peak: Noel Peak (3062 m)
- Listing: Canada highest major peaks 78th; Canada prominent peaks 67th; Mountains of British Columbia
- Coordinates: 57°46′36″N 132°20′00″W

Geography
- Location: British Columbia, Canada
- District: Cassiar Land District
- Parent range: Boundary Ranges, Coast Mountains
- Topo map: NTS 104F16 Chutine Peak

Climbing
- First ascent: 16 July 1980 by Geoffrey Faraghan, Paul Tamm, Chris Wilson, Leslie Wilson

Chutine Peak is one of the highest mountains in the Boundary Ranges, a group of subranges of the northern Coast Mountains of British Columbia and Alaska. Chutine Peak lies just east of the Stikine Icecap, and to the north and west of the Stikine River, and south of the basin of the Whiting River. It is notable for its huge west face: the drop to Chutine Lake is 2,600 m (8,530 ft) in 3.5 km (2 mi). Due to its remoteness, however, it is rarely visited.

The mountain was named in 1980 by the first ascent party for its location near Chutine Lake and Chutine River. Chutine means "the half-people" - half Tlingit and half Tahltan

== See also ==
- Geography of British Columbia
