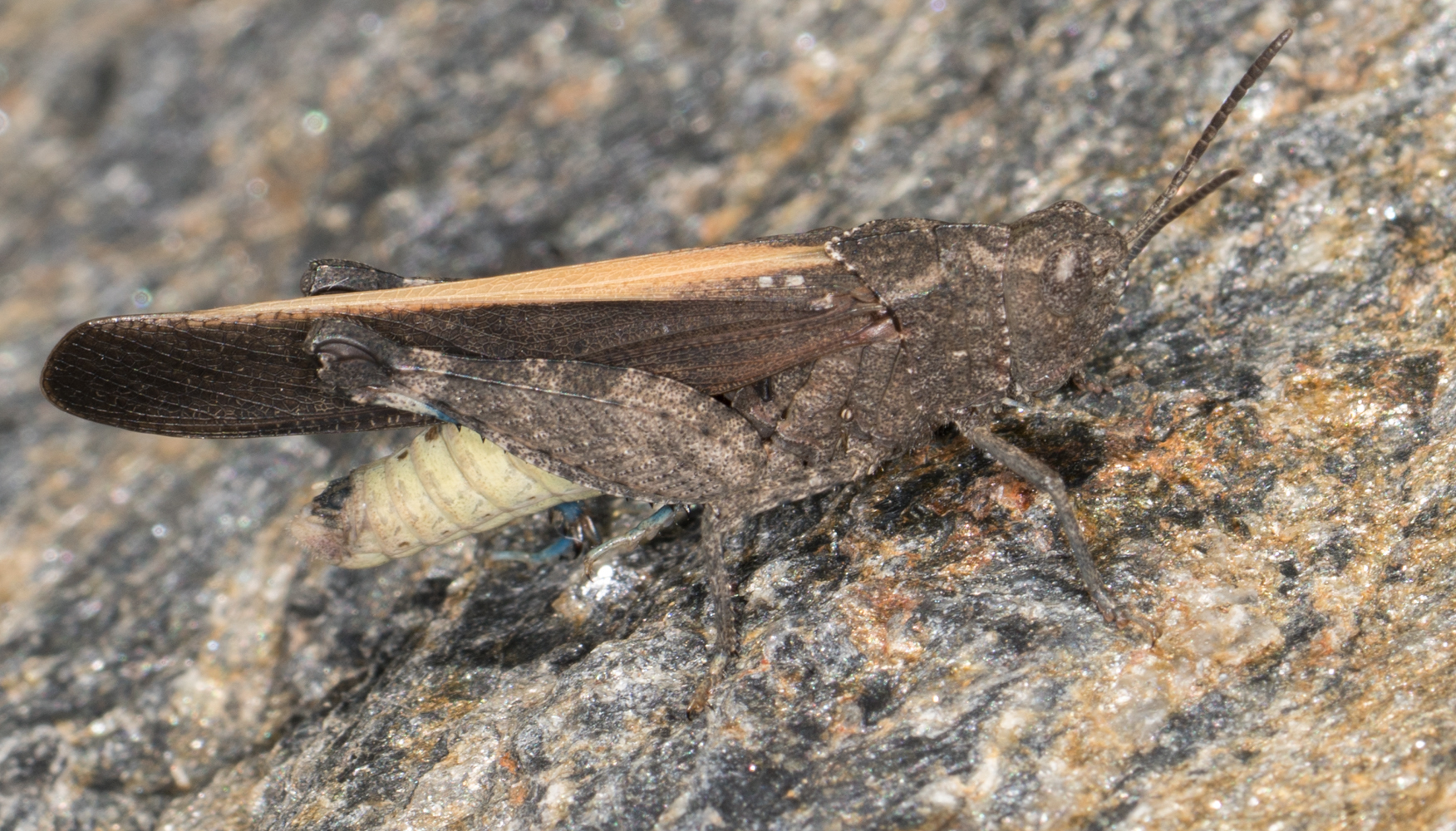

Scientific classification
- Kingdom: Animalia
- Phylum: Arthropoda
- Clade: Pancrustacea
- Class: Insecta
- Order: Orthoptera
- Suborder: Caelifera
- Family: Acrididae
- Tribe: Arphiini
- Genus: Arphia
- Species: A. ramona

Binomial name
- Arphia ramona Rehn, 1902

= Arphia ramona =

Species of grasshopper

Arphia ramona, the California orange-winged grasshopper, is a species of band-winged grasshopper in the family Acrididae, often called the short-horned grasshopper. The short-horned grasshopper is known to be agriculturally harmful to crops as their diet consists of leaves, flowers, and seeds. It is found in Central America and North America. In California, it is found from the Coast Ranges to Mt. Diablo. Its hind wings are orange, and its body is long, slender, or can be short, and stout. The California orange-winged grasshopper can be 23mm to 31mm in size for males, while the females range from 30mm to 41mm. Grasshoppers begin to appear in late winter and early spring. The California orange-winged grasshopper is known for making a cracking noise while flying by rubbing its front wings together. The noise produced during flight by male and some female band-wing grasshoppers is associated with mating. When they are in flight, you can see their colorful hind wings, usually orange, hidden behind their front wings while still. They are commonly found in a sunny, open patch of soil, blending in with their surrounding environment due to their camouflage coloring. Female grasshoppers reproduce 100 eggs in the soil, which will continue the life cycle of different stages of molts.
