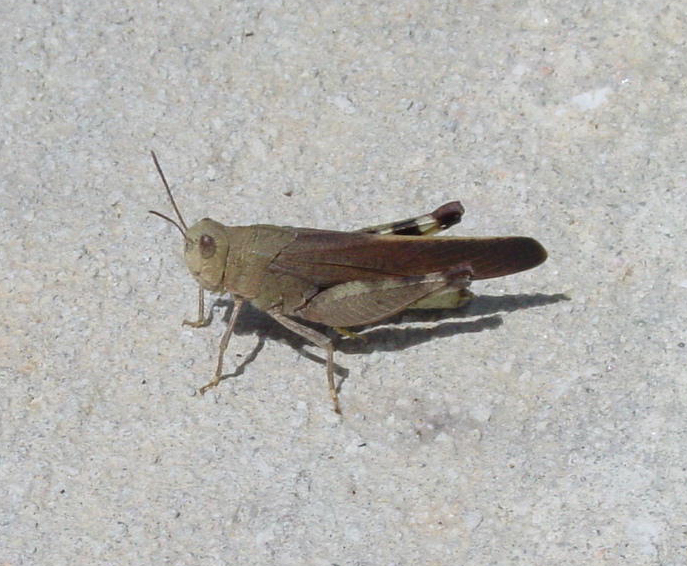

Scientific classification
- Kingdom: Animalia
- Phylum: Arthropoda
- Clade: Pancrustacea
- Class: Insecta
- Order: Orthoptera
- Suborder: Caelifera
- Family: Acrididae
- Genus: Arphia
- Species: A. granulata

Binomial name
- Arphia granulata Saussure, 1884

= Arphia granulata =

Species of grasshopper

Arphia granulata is a species of grasshopper in the subfamily Oedipodinae ("band-winged grasshoppers"), in the family Acrididae ("short-horned grasshoppers"). The species is known generally as the "southern yellow-winged grasshopper". It is found in North America.
