= Arphia saussureana =

Scientific classification
- Kingdom: Animalia
- Phylum: Arthropoda
- Clade: Pancrustacea
- Class: Insecta
- Order: Orthoptera
- Suborder: Caelifera
- Family: Acrididae
- Tribe: Arphiini
- Genus: Arphia
- Species: A. saussureana

Binomial name
- Arphia saussureana Bruner, 1889

Species of grasshopper

Arphia saussureana, the California red-winged grasshopper, is a species of band-winged grasshopper in the family Acrididae. It is found in North America.
