= Rousseau Range =

Mountain range in Alaska, United States

- Location within Alaska

Dimensions
- Area: 264 km^{2} (102 mi^{2})

Geography
- Country: United States
- Region: Alaska
- Range coordinates: 55°24.6′N 130°15.2′W
- Parent range: Boundary Ranges

The Rousseau Range is a small mountain range in southeastern Alaska, United States, located just north of the Peabody Mountains. It has an area of 264 km^{2} and is a subrange of the Boundary Ranges which in turn form part of the Coast Mountains. The range is located entirely within Misty Fjords National Monument.

It was possibly named for General Lovell H. Rousseau, who accepted the territory of Alaska for the United States in 1867, in a ceremony with Russian representatives at Sitka.

It is near Halibut Bay, Tombstone Bay, Astronomical Point, Blunt Point, Breezy Point, Halibut Point, Petrel Point, River Point, Steep Point, Turn Point and other notable geographic wonders.

== See also ==
- List of mountain ranges
