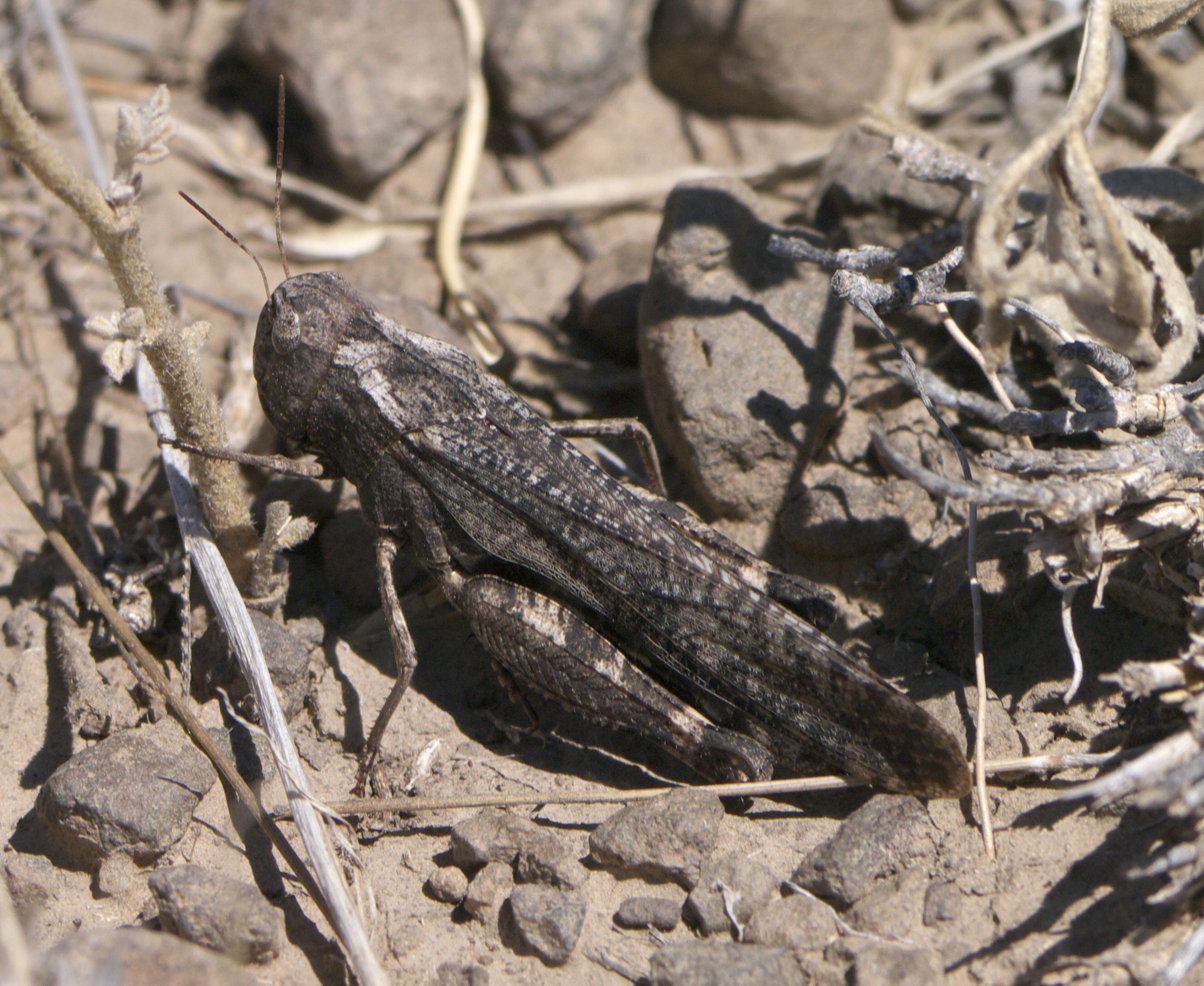

Scientific classification
- Kingdom: Animalia
- Phylum: Arthropoda
- Clade: Pancrustacea
- Class: Insecta
- Order: Orthoptera
- Suborder: Caelifera
- Family: Acrididae
- Tribe: Arphiini
- Genus: Arphia
- Species: A. pseudonietana

Binomial name
- Arphia pseudonietana (Thomas, 1870)

= Arphia pseudonietana =

Species of grasshopper

Arphia pseudonietana, known generally as the red-winged grasshopper or red-winged locust, is a species of band-winged grasshopper in the family Acrididae. It is found in Central America and North America.

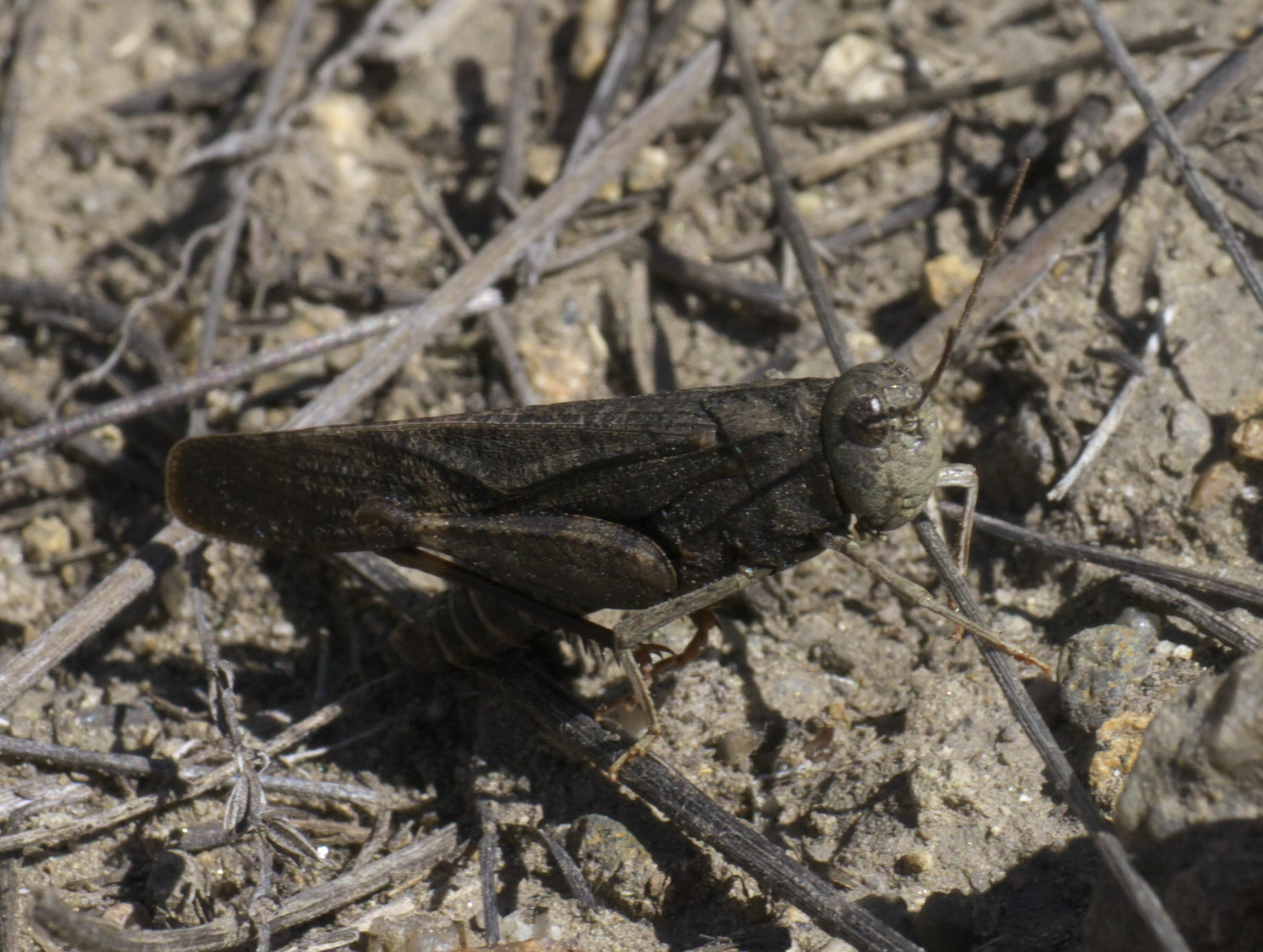
Red-winged grasshopper, Arphia pseudonietana
