= Chutine =

- Location of Chutine in British Columbia
- Coordinates: 57°40′00″N 131°35′00″W
- Country: Canada
- Province: British Columbia
- Area codes: 250, 778

Chutine, originally Chutine Landing, is an abandoned locality and a former settlement at the confluence of the Chutine and Stikine Rivers in the Stikine Country of northwestern British Columbia, Canada. The name "Chutine" means "half-people" in the Tahltan language, as the community here was a mixture of Tahltan and Tlingit peoples.
