= Adam Mountains =

Mountain range in Alaska, United States

- Adam Range
- Location within Alaska

Dimensions
- Area: 50 km^{2} (19 mi^{2})

Geography
- Country: United States
- State: Alaska
- Range coordinates: 55°39′14″N 130°26′27″W
- Parent range: Boundary Ranges

The Adam Mountains, sometimes called the Adam Range, are a small mountain range in the southeastern extremity of the Alaska Panhandle, in the Ketchikan Gateway Borough near the Halleck Range. It has an area of 50 km^{2} and is a subrange of the Boundary Ranges which in turn form part of the Coast Mountains.

== See also ==
- List of mountain ranges
