= Chechidla Range =

Mountain range in British Columbia, Canada

- Location within British Columbia

Geography
- Country: Canada
- Region: British Columbia
- Range coordinates: 58°15′N 132°35′W
- Parent range: Stikine Icecap

The Chechidla Range is a mountain range in northwest British Columbia, Canada, located about 150 km (93 mi) west of Dease Lake and 125–150 km south-southeast of Atlin. It has an area of 3236 km^{2} and lies roughly in between the Whiting and Sutlahine Rivers on the west and northwest and the Samotua and Sheslay on the east. It is a subrange of the Boundary Ranges which in turn form part of the Coast Mountains of the Pacific Cordillera mountain system. The Whiting River has its source in the range. The range's name is an approximation of a phrase in the Tahltan language meaning "mountains of small rocks".

== See also ==
- List of mountain ranges
- Cheja Range
