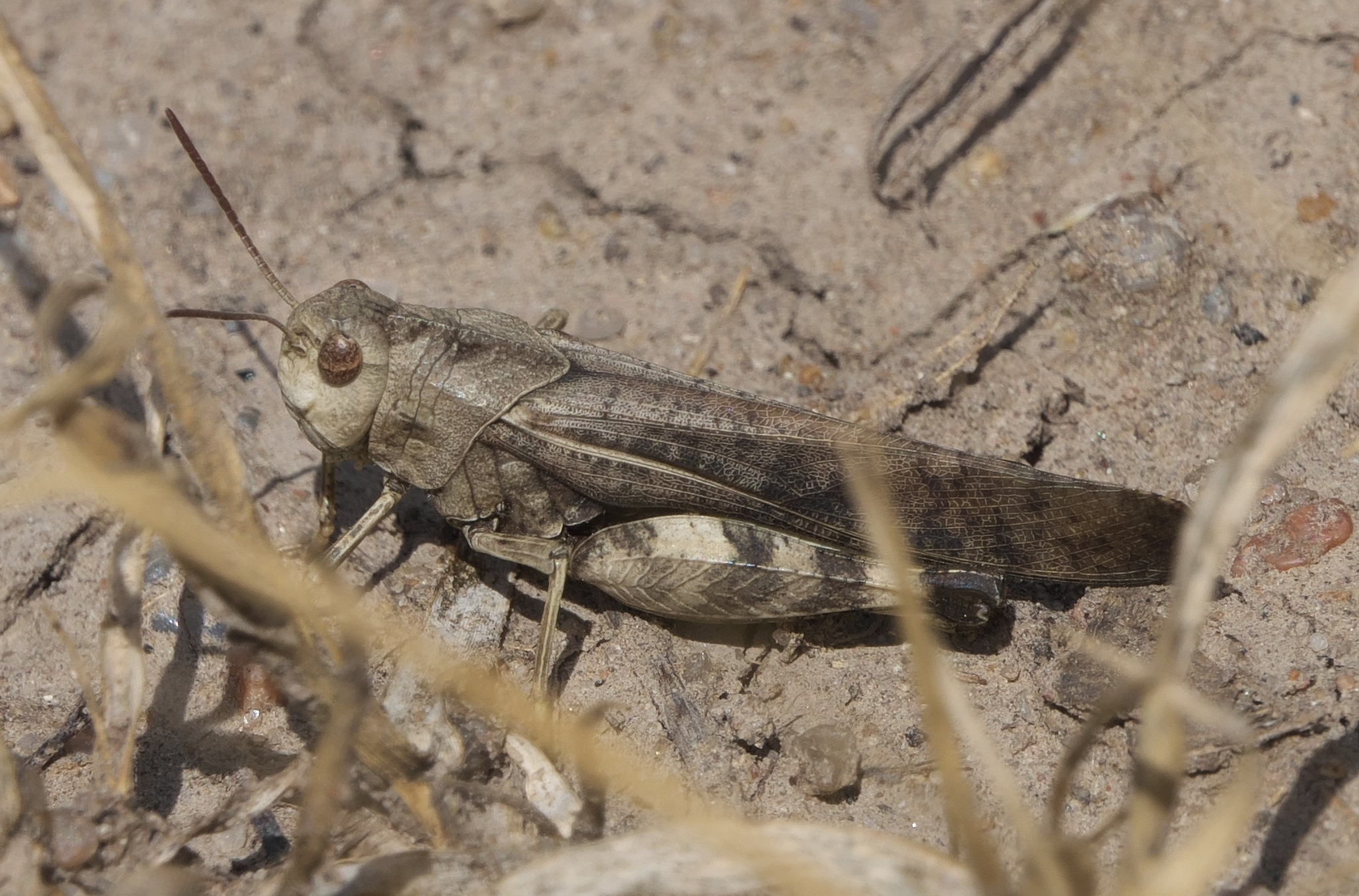
- Arphia simplex, Kansas

Scientific classification
- Kingdom: Animalia
- Phylum: Arthropoda
- Clade: Pancrustacea
- Class: Insecta
- Order: Orthoptera
- Suborder: Caelifera
- Family: Acrididae
- Tribe: Arphiini
- Genus: Arphia
- Species: A. simplex

Binomial name
- Arphia simplex Scudder, 1875

= Arphia simplex =

Species of grasshopper

Arphia simplex, the plains yellow-winged grasshopper, is a species of band-winged grasshopper in the family Acrididae. It is found in Central America and North America.
