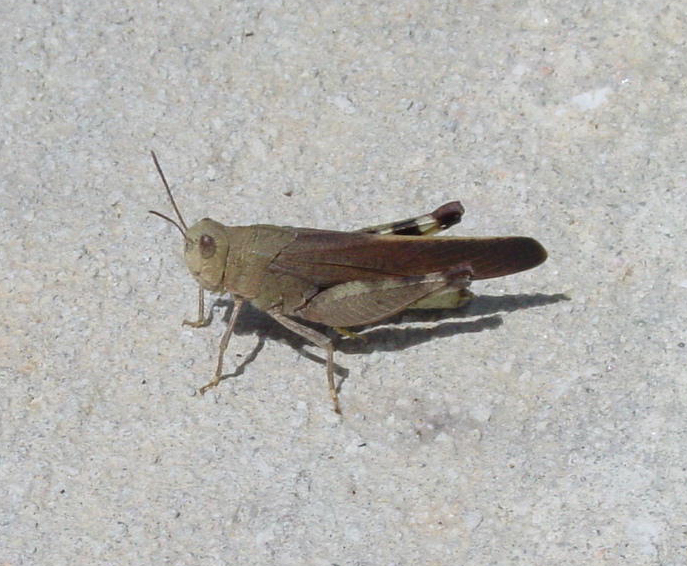
- Arphia granulata

Scientific classification
- Kingdom: Animalia
- Phylum: Arthropoda
- Clade: Pancrustacea
- Class: Insecta
- Order: Orthoptera
- Suborder: Caelifera
- Family: Acrididae
- Subfamily: Oedipodinae
- Tribe: Arphiini
- Genus: Arphia; Stål, 1873

= Arphia =

Genus of grasshoppers

Arphia is a genus of band-winged grasshoppers in the family Acrididae. There are at least 11 described species in the genus Arphia.

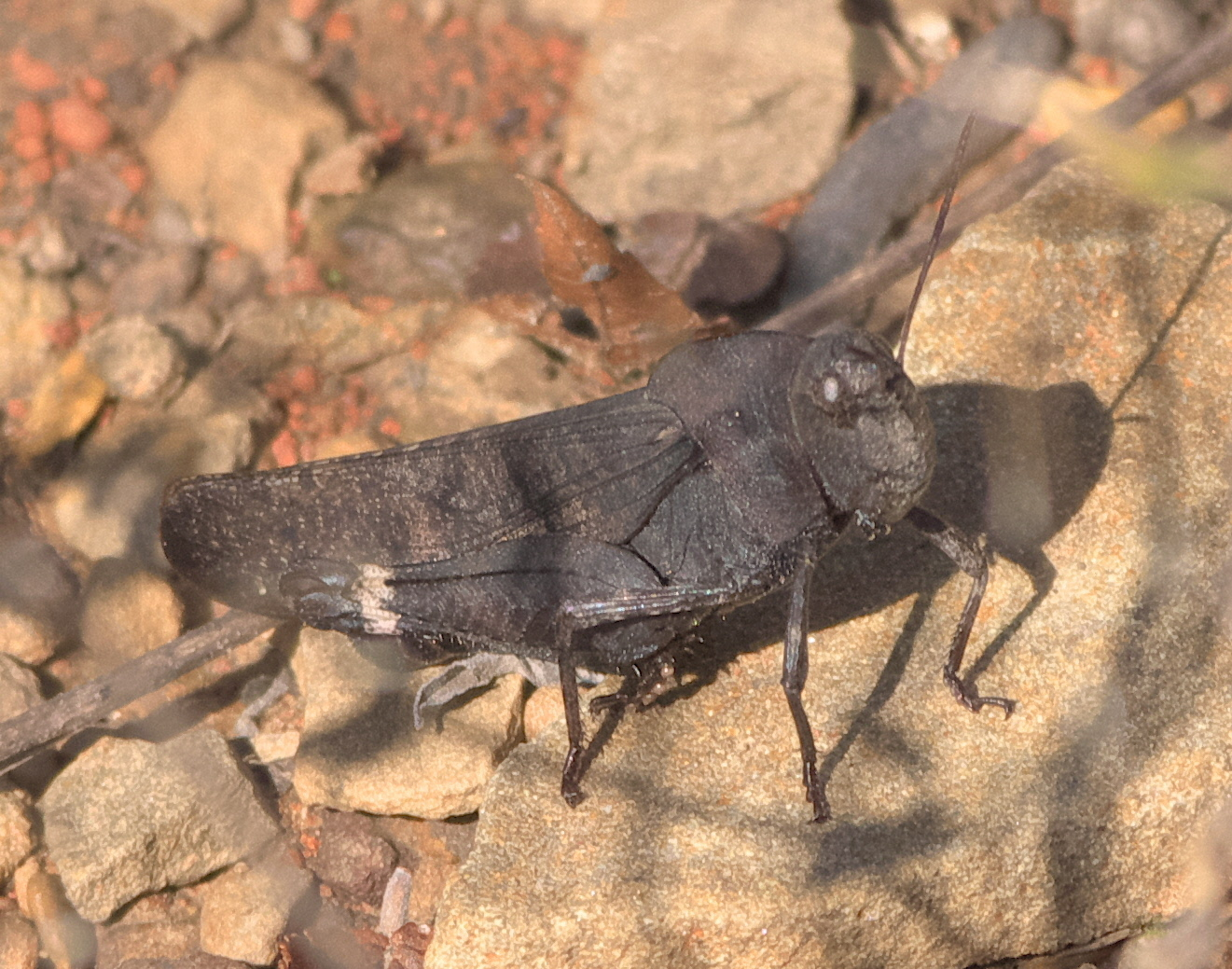
Arphia xanthoptera

== Species ==
- Arphia behrensi Saussure, 1884 - California sulphur-winged grasshopper
- Arphia conspersa Scudder, 1875 - speckle-winged rangeland grasshopper
- Arphia granulata Saussure, 1884 - southern yellow-winged grasshopper
- Arphia pecos Otte, 1984 - Pecos arphia
- Arphia pseudonietana (Thomas, 1870) - red-winged grasshopper
- Arphia pulchripennis Bruner, 1905
- Arphia ramona Rehn, 1902 - California orange-winged grasshopper
- Arphia saussureana Bruner, 1889 - California red-winged grasshopper
- Arphia simplex Scudder, 1875 - plains yellow-winged grasshopper
- Arphia sulphurea (Fabricius, 1781) - sulphur-winged grasshopper
- Arphia xanthoptera (Burmeister, 1838) - autumn yellow-winged grasshopper
