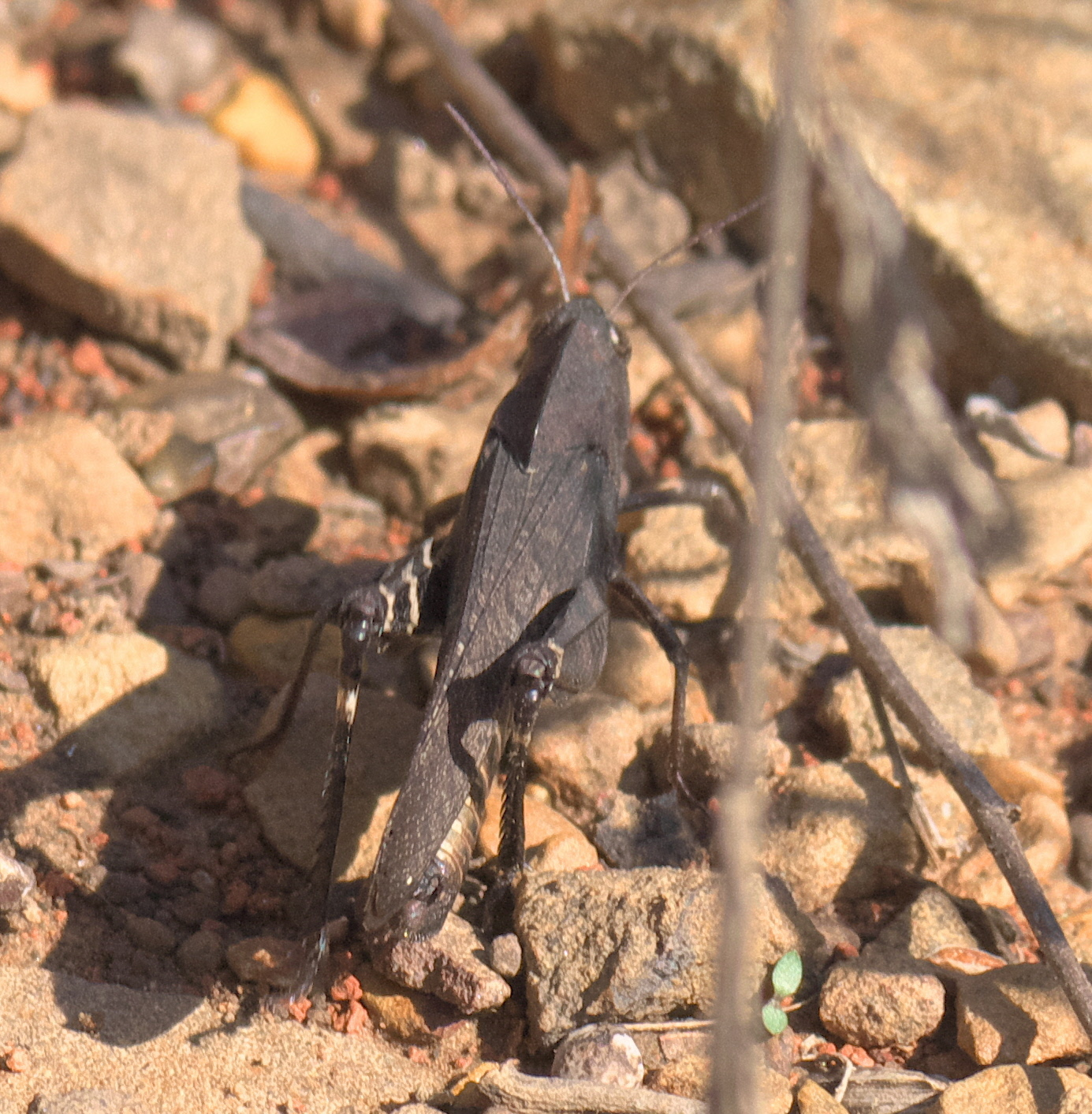

Scientific classification
- Kingdom: Animalia
- Phylum: Arthropoda
- Clade: Pancrustacea
- Class: Insecta
- Order: Orthoptera
- Suborder: Caelifera
- Family: Acrididae
- Genus: Arphia
- Species: A. xanthoptera

Binomial name
- Arphia xanthoptera (Burmeister, 1838)

= Arphia xanthoptera =

Species of grasshopper

Arphia xanthoptera, the autumn yellow-winged grasshopper, is a species of band-winged grasshopper in the family Acrididae. It is found in North America.

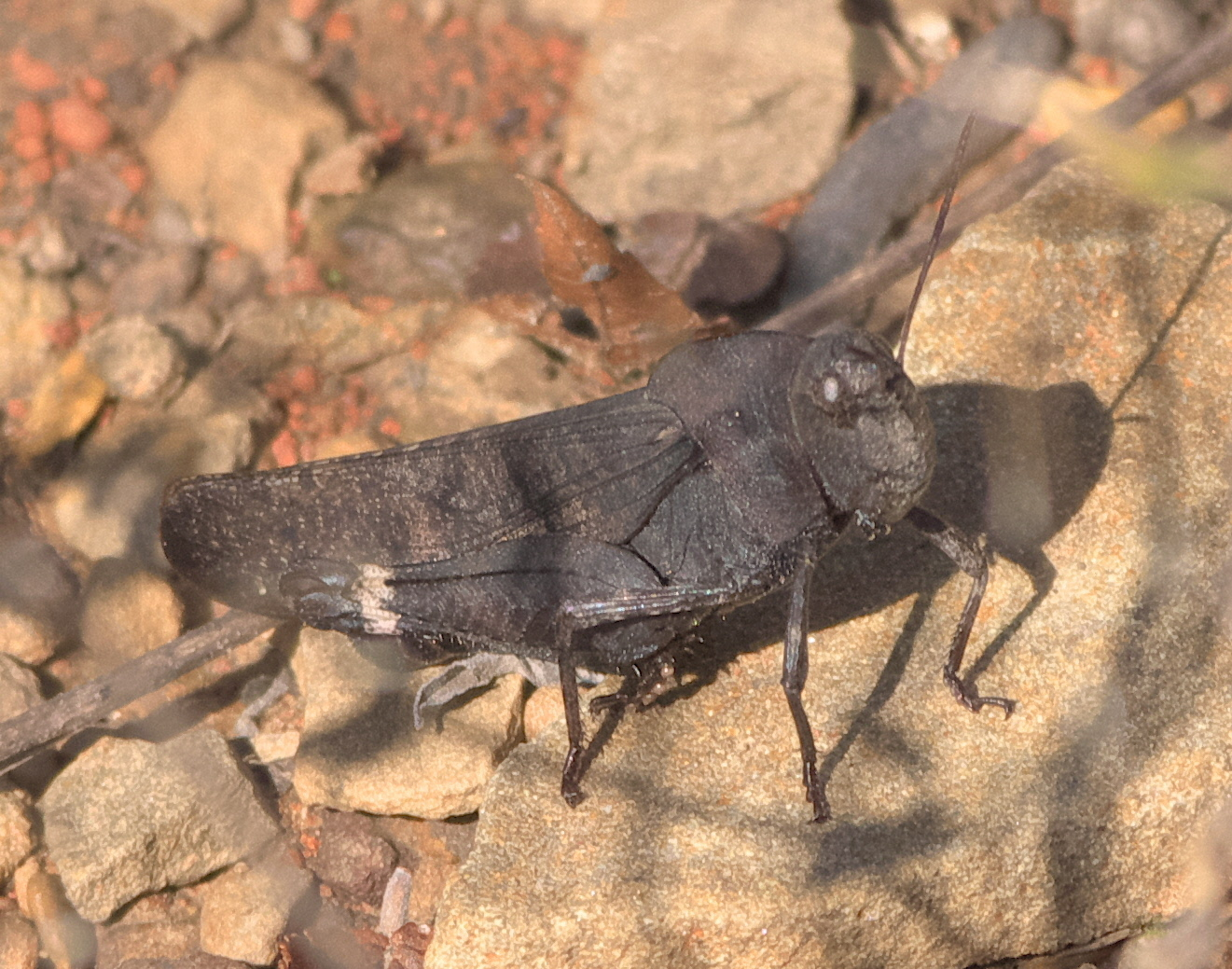
Autumn Yellow-winged Grasshopper, Arphia xanthoptera, West of Pryor, OK, USA
