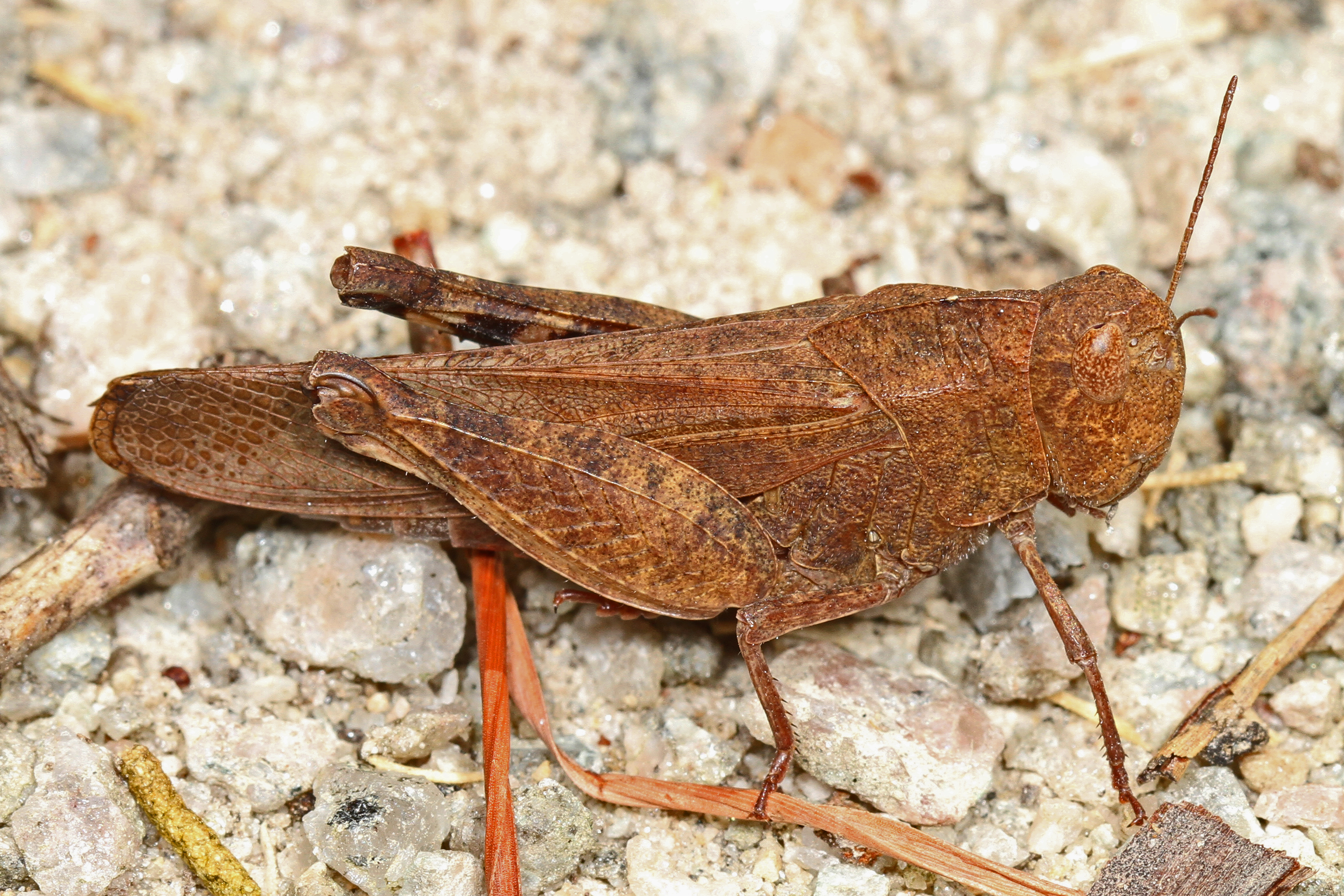

Scientific classification
- Kingdom: Animalia
- Phylum: Arthropoda
- Clade: Pancrustacea
- Class: Insecta
- Order: Orthoptera
- Suborder: Caelifera
- Family: Acrididae
- Genus: Arphia
- Species: A. sulphurea

Binomial name
- Arphia sulphurea (Fabricius, 1781)

= Arphia sulphurea =

Species of grasshopper

Arphia sulphurea, known generally as sulphur-winged grasshopper, is a species of band-winged grasshopper in the family Acrididae. Other common names include the spring yellow-winged locust and spring yellow-winged grasshopper. It is found in North America.

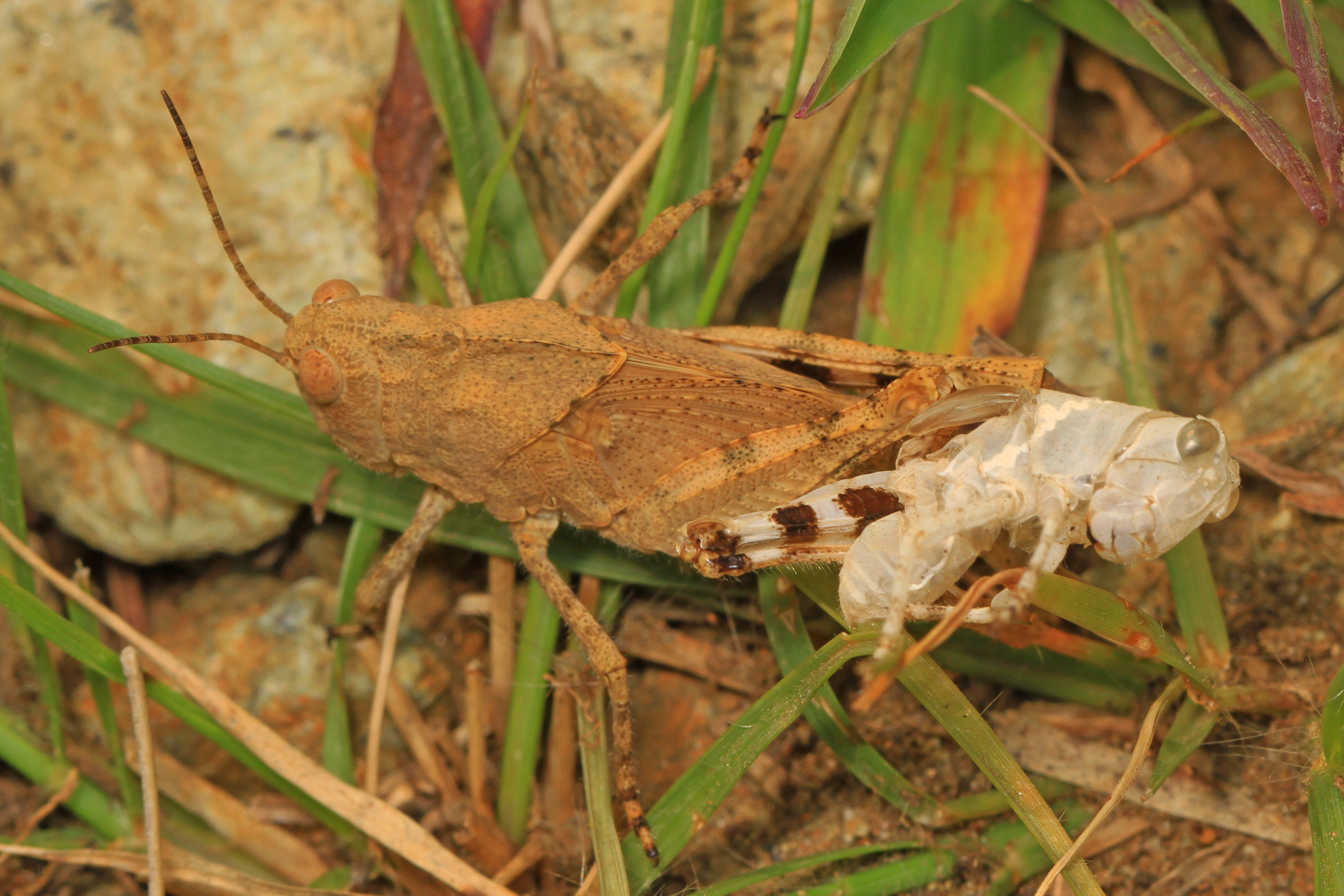
Sulphur-winged grasshopper, Arphia sulphurea
