= Mount Ratz =

Mountain in British Columbia, Canada

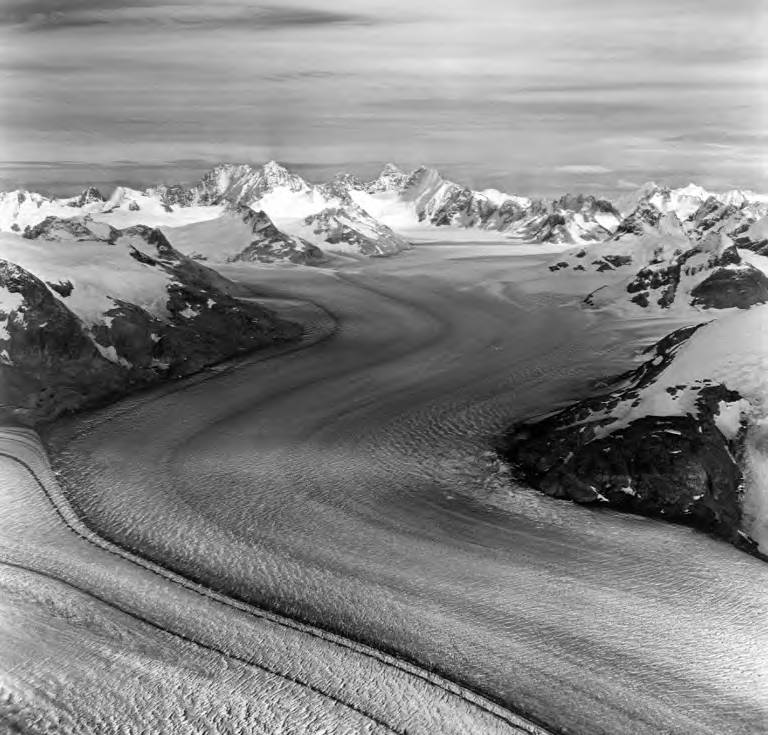
- Mount Ratz centered on skyline

Highest point
- Elevation: 3,090 m (10,140 ft)
- Prominence: 2,430 m (7,970 ft)
- Listing: Mountains of British Columbia; North America prominent peak 40th; North America isolated peaks 63rd; Canada highest major peaks 61st; Canada most prominent peak 14th; Canada most isolated peaks 20th
- Coordinates: 57°23′35″N 132°18′12″W

Geography
- Location within British Columbia Location within Canada
- Location: British Columbia, Canada
- District: Cassiar Land District
- Parent range: Stikine Icecap, Boundary Ranges
- Topo map: NTS 104F8 Mount Ratz

Mount Ratz is a mountain located just west of the Stikine River, about 5 km (3 mi) east of the British Columbia–Alaska border. It is the highest peak in the Stikine Icecap and of the Boundary Ranges which in turn form part of the Coast Mountains. It is an extremely high-prominence summit, with a difference in elevation with its "key col" at Hyland Ranch Pass of 2,430 m (7,972 ft). Thus making it one of Canada's Ultra peaks.

Mount Ratz is named for William Francis Ratz, Dominion Land Surveyor and engineer-in-charge of surveying the Taku, Whiting and Stikine Rivers, who died on February 6, 1909.

"I regret to have to record the death of Mr. W.F. Ratz which occurred in Ottawa on February 6. Mr. Ratz had been employed on the Alaska survey since 1905. He carried out demarcation of the line at [Tsirku] river (Chilkat district), and in part between Taku Inlet and Whiting river. During the last two years he was engaged on the topographical survey between Whiting and Stikine rivers, not the least difficult section of a very difficult survey. His success in carrying this to completion in a relatively short time is a testimony of his capability as a surveyor as well as to his personal energy. His death, at the early age of 25, is a serious loss to the profession and to the public service."

Report of the Chief Astronomer to the Deputy Minister of the Interior, Canada, for the year ending March 31, 1909, p.17; republished in Report of the International Boundary Commission, 1952, footnote p.79.

== See also ==
- Highest mountain peaks of Canada
- List of the most prominent summits of North America
- Table of the most isolated major summits of North America
