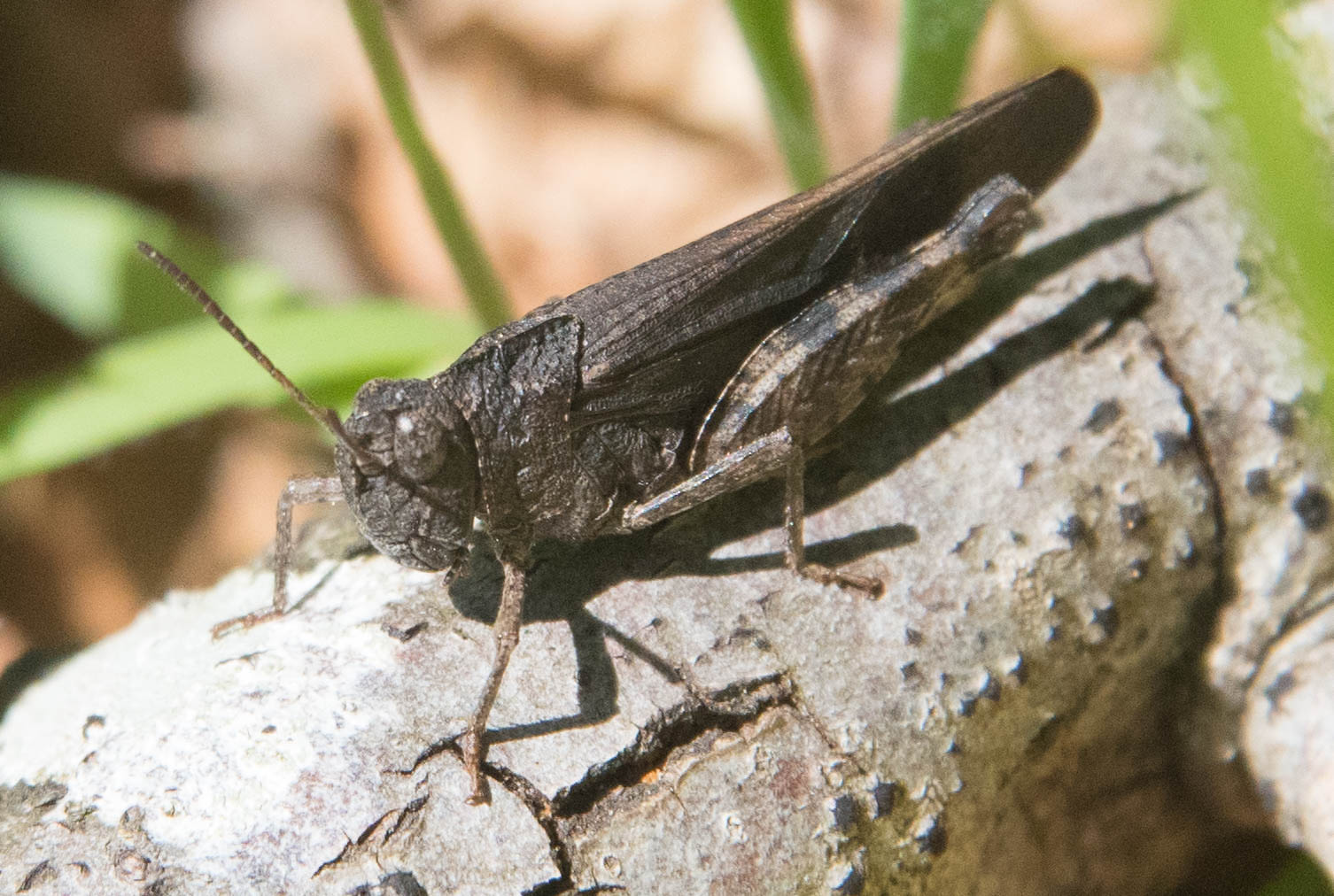

Scientific classification
- Kingdom: Animalia
- Phylum: Arthropoda
- Clade: Pancrustacea
- Class: Insecta
- Order: Orthoptera
- Suborder: Caelifera
- Family: Acrididae
- Tribe: Arphiini
- Genus: Arphia
- Species: A. behrensi

Binomial name
- Arphia behrensi Saussure, 1884

= Arphia behrensi =

Species of grasshopper

Arphia behrensi, the California sulphur-winged grasshopper, is a species of band-winged grasshopper in the family Acrididae. It is found in California along the Sierra Nevada, the San Francisco Bay Area, and north of the Bay Area.

It is 22-40 mm long and has yellow hind wings.
