= Florence Range =

Mountain range in British Columbia, Canada

- Location within British Columbia

Geography
- Country: Canada
- Region: British Columbia
- Range coordinates: 59°22′N 134°21′W
- Parent range: Boundary Ranges

The Florence Range is a small mountain range in northwestern British Columbia, Canada, located at the southern end of Taku Arm and west of Nelson Lake. It has an area of 153 km^{2} and is a subrange of the Boundary Ranges which in turn form part of the Coast Mountains.

== See also ==
- List of mountain ranges
