= Dezadeash Range =

Mountain range in Yukon, Canada

- Location within Yukon

Highest point
- Coordinates: 60°41′27″N 136°55′14″W

Geography
- Country: Canada
- Region: Yukon
- Parent range: Boundary Ranges/Yukon Plateau

The Dezadeash Range is a mountain range in southern Yukon, Canada, located east of Haines Junction and south of the Alaska Highway. It has an area of 1,005 km^{2} (388 mi^{2}) and its appearance has a triangular shape. Although it can be considered to lie within the northern Boundary Ranges of the Coast Mountains, the Canadian Government consider the Dezadeash Range as part of the Yukon Plateau.

== See also ==
- List of mountain ranges
