= Longview Range =

Mountain range in British Columbia

- Location within British Columbia

Geography
- Country: Canada
- Region: British Columbia
- Range coordinates: 56°23′N 129°33′W
- Parent range: Boundary Ranges

The Longview Range is a small mountain range in northwestern British Columbia, Canada, located between Bowser Lake and Surveyors Creek. It has an area of 165 km^{2} and is a subrange of the Boundary Ranges which in turn form part of the Coast Mountains.

== See also ==
- List of mountain ranges
