= Keta River =

Coordinates: 55°20′15″N 130°28′28″W

The Keta River is a river in Southeastern Alaska in the United States, flowing generally south-southwest to enter the Boca de Quadra, which connects to the sea via Revillagigedo Channel about 45 miles (72 km) east of Ketchikan. It is located almost entirely within Misty Fjords National Monument.
