= Ashington Range =

Mountain range in British Columbia, Canada

- Location within British Columbia

Geography
- Country: Canada
- Region: British Columbia
- Range coordinates: 55°09′59″N 130°00′06″W
- Parent range: Boundary Ranges

The Ashington Range is a mountain range of the Boundary Ranges in northwestern British Columbia, Canada. North of the Ashington Range lies the Burniston Range.

== Landforms ==
- Mount Dent
- Mount Jauncey

== See also ==
- Coast Mountains
