= Boca de Quadra =

Bay in Ketchikan Gateway Borough, Alaska, United States

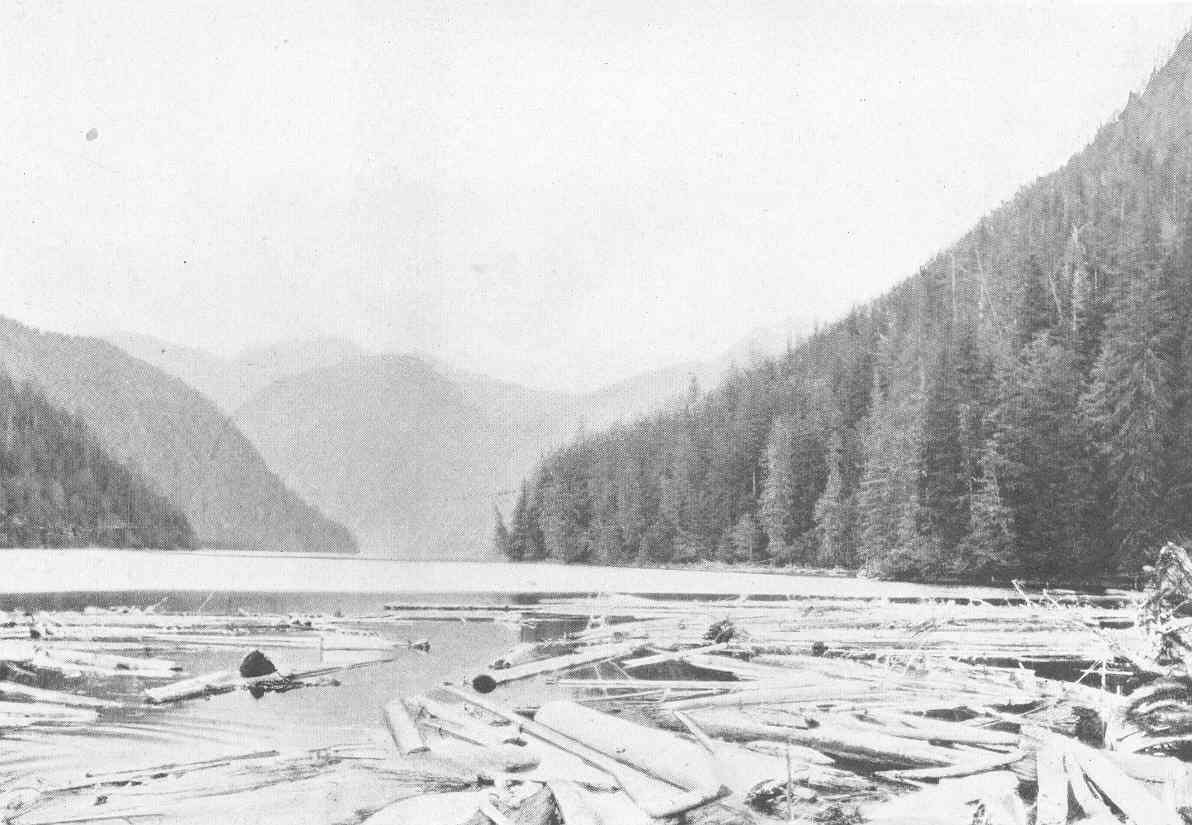
- 1915 photograph

- Location in Alaska
- Location: Alexander Archipelago, Alaska
- Coordinates: 55°07′57″N 130°42′21″W
- Type: Bay
- Etymology: Named for Juan Francisco de Bodega y Quadra

The Boca de Quadra is a bay extending southwest from the Keta River to Revillagigedo Channel in Southeastern Alaska. It is located almost entirely within Misty Fjords National Monument.

== Name origin ==
The bay was named in 1792 for Juan Francisco de Bodega y Quadra by Jacinto Caamano, in relation to Quadra's expeditions and surveys in the region in 1775–79. The name was adopted by Captain George Vancouver, RN who explored this estuary on August 6, 1793.
