= Snowslide Range =

Mountain range in British Columbia, Canada

Coordinates: 56.63°N 129.8°W

- Location within British Columbia

Geography
- Country: Canada
- Region: British Columbia
- Parent range: Boundary Ranges

The Snowslide Range is a mountain range in northwestern British Columbia, Canada, located west of the Bell-Irving River, between Treaty Creek in the south and Teigen Creek in the north. It has an area of 189 km^{2} (73 sq mi) and is a subrange of the Boundary Ranges which in turn form part of the Coast Mountains.

== See also ==
- List of mountain ranges
