= Burniston Range =

Mountain range in British Columbia, Canada

- Location within British Columbia

Highest point
- Elevation: 2,064 m (6,772 ft)
- Coordinates: 55°38′N 130°00′W

Geography
- Country: Canada
- Region: British Columbia
- Parent range: Boundary Ranges

The Burniston Range is a mountain range of the Boundary Ranges in northwestern British Columbia, Canada, located on the northeast side of Portland Canal and north of the Ashington Range.

== Landforms ==
- Carr Ridge
- Mount Ashby
- Mount Clashmore
- Mount George
- Mount Guanton
- Mount Marshal
- Mount Newport
- Mount Tournay
