= Lincoln Mountains =

Mountain range in Alaska, United States

- Location within Alaska

Dimensions
- Area: 235 km^{2} (91 mi^{2})

Geography
- Country: United States
- Region: Alaska
- Range coordinates: 55°57.6′N 130°08.2′W
- Parent range: Boundary Ranges

The Lincoln Mountains is a mountain range in southeastern Alaska, United States, located on the Alaskan side of the Portland Canal between the Salmon River and the Soule River, near the community of Hyder. It has an area of 235 km^{2} and is a subrange of the Boundary Ranges which in turn form part of the Coast Mountains.

== See also ==
- List of mountain ranges
