= Boundary Ranges =

Subrange of the Coast Mountains in Alaska, British Columbia, and Yukon

- Alaska Boundary Range
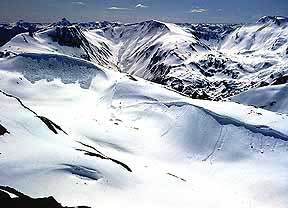
- View of the Juneau Icefield.

Highest point
- Peak: Mount Ratz, British Columbia
- Elevation: 3,090 m (10,140 ft)
- Coordinates: 57°23′35.2″N 132°18′11.2″W

Dimensions
- Area: 87,101 km^{2} (33,630 mi^{2})

Geography
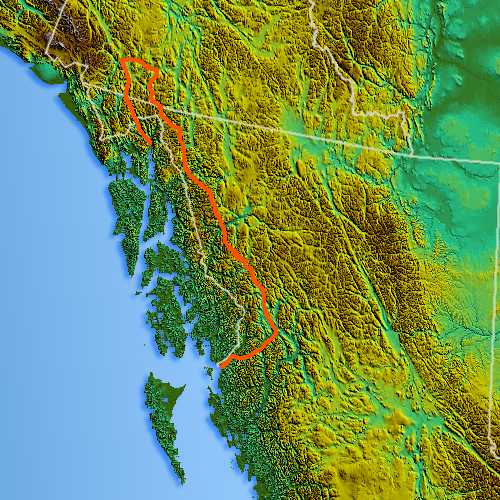
- Location map of Boundary Ranges; marine shoreline-boundary not shown
- Countries: Canada; United States
- States/Provinces: Alaska; British Columbia; Yukon
- Parent range: Coast Mountains

The Boundary Ranges, also known in the singular and as the Alaska Boundary Range, are the largest and most northerly subrange of the Coast Mountains. They begin at the Nass River, near the southern end of the Alaska Panhandle in British Columbia and run to the Kelsall River, near the Chilkoot Pass, beyond which are the Alsek Ranges of the Saint Elias Mountains, and northwards into the Yukon Territory flanking the west side of the Yukon River drainage as far as Champagne Pass, north of which being the Yukon Ranges. To their east are the Skeena Mountains and Stikine Plateau of the Interior Mountains complex that lies northwest of the Interior Plateau; the immediately adjoining subregion of the Stikine Plateau is the Tahltan Highland. To their northeast is the Tagish Highland, which is a subregion of the Yukon Plateau. Both highlands are considered in some descriptions as included in the Coast Mountains. The Alexander Archipelago lies offshore and is entirely within Alaska.

The Boundary Ranges include several large icefields, including the Juneau Icefield, between the Alaskan city of the same name and Atlin Lake in B.C.; and the Stikine Icecap, which lies between the lower Stikine River and the Whiting River. Some of the highest mountains in the Boundary Ranges are: Mount Ratz, 3,090 m (10,138 ft); Chutine Peak, 2,910 m (9,547 ft); and Devils Thumb, 2,766 m (9,075 ft), all in the Stikine Icecap region; and Devils Paw, 2,593 m (8,507 ft), in the Juneau Icefield. (Other peaks in the Stikine Icecap are higher than 2,600 m (8,530 ft), but they have relatively low topographic prominence.)

Despite the height of Mount Ratz and its neighbours, most of the Boundary Ranges are considerably lower than the Pacific Ranges of the southern Coast Mountains. The larger icefields of the Boundary Ranges are at a much lower elevation than their southern counterparts in the Pacific Ranges because of the difference in latitude.

Physiographically, they are a section of the larger Pacific Border province, which in turn is part of the larger Pacific Mountain System physiographic division.

The granitic intrusions that form the Boundary Ranges are remnants of a Late Cretaceous volcanic arc system called the Coast Range Arc.

== Subranges ==
- Boundary Range
- Cheja Range
- Chechidla Range
- Chutine Icefield
- Adam Mountains
- Ashington Range
- Burniston Range
- Dezadeash Range
- Florence Range
- Halleck Range
- Juneau Icefield
- Kahpo Mountains
- Kakuhan Range
- Lincoln Mountains
- Longview Range
- Peabody Mountains
- Rousseau Range
- Seward Mountains
- Snowslide Range
- Spectrum Range
- Stikine Icecap

== Rivers ==
Rivers draining or transiting the Boundary Ranges include the:

- Chilkat River
- Choquette River
- Craig River
- Iskut River
- Kelsall River
- Keta River
- King Salmon Creek
- Klehini River
- Lava Fork
- Nass River
- Porcupine River
- Salmon River
- Scud River
- Skagway River
- Stikine River
- Taiya River
- Taku River
- Tulsequah River
- Unuk River
- Whiting River

== See also ==
- List of Boundary Peaks of the Alaska-British Columbia/Yukon border
