= Seward Mountains (Alaska) =

Mountain range in Alaska, United States

- Location within Alaska

Dimensions
- Area: 107 km^{2} (41 mi^{2})

Geography
- Country: United States
- Region: Alaska
- Range coordinates: 55°52.1′N 130°17.9′W
- Parent range: Boundary Ranges

The Seward Mountains is a small mountain range in southeastern Alaska, United States, located on the upper Portland Canal. It has an area of 107 km^{2} and is a subrange of the Boundary Ranges which in turn form part of the Coast Mountains. Part of the eastern border of Misty Fjords National Monument transects the range. Despite its name, the Seward Mountains are located nowhere near Seward, Alaska or the Seward Peninsula, though the Seward Peninsula has its own set of four maintain ranges: the Kigluaik Mountains, Bendeleben Mountains, Darby Mountains, and York Mountains.

== See also ==
- List of mountain ranges
