= Peabody Mountains =

Mountain range in Alaska, United States

- Location within Alaska

Geography
- Country: United States
- Region: Alaska
- Range coordinates: 55°09.85′N 130°17.8′W
- Parent range: Boundary Ranges

The Peabody Mountains is a mountain range in southeastern Alaska located between the lower Portland Canal and the Marten River. It has an area of 1387 km^{2} and is a subrange of the Boundary Ranges which in turn form part of the Coast Mountains. The range is located entirely within Misty Fjords National Monument.

It is about 6 kilometres (3.7 miles) from the Canada–United States border.

== See also ==
- List of mountain ranges
