= Porcupine River (British Columbia) =

Coordinates: 57°03′00″N 131°43′00″W

The Porcupine River is a left tributary of the Stikine River in northwestern British Columbia, Canada, entering that stream south of the confluence of the Anuk River and above the confluence of the Iskut.

== See also ==
- Stikine Gold Rush
- List of rivers of British Columbia
