= Halleck Range =

Mountain range in Alaska, United States

- Location within Alaska

Geography
- Country: United States
- Region: Alaska
- Range coordinates: 55°38′N 130°14′W
- Parent range: Boundary Ranges

The Halleck Range is a small mountain range in southeastern Alaska, United States, located on the Alaskan side of the Portland Canal. It has an area of 127 km^{2} and is a subrange of the Boundary Ranges which in turn form part of the Coast Mountains. The range is located within the Misty Fjords National Monument.

== See also ==
- List of mountain ranges
