= Cheja Range =

Mountain range in British Columbia, Canada

- Location within British Columbia

Dimensions
- Area: 732 km^{2} (283 mi^{2})

Geography
- Country: Canada
- Region: British Columbia
- Range coordinates: 58°05′N 132°30′W
- Parent range: Boundary Ranges

The Cheja Range is an icefield-bound mountain range on the inside perimeter of the Alaska Panhandle in northwest British Columbia, Canada. It lies between the South Whiting River and the Samotua River. It is a subrange of the Boundary Ranges which in turn form part of the Pacific Cordillera mountain system. The name is an approximation of a phrase in the Tahltan language meaning "mountains are hard".

== See also ==
- List of mountain ranges
