= Whiting River =

- Location of the mouth of the Whiting River in Alaska

Location
- Country: Canada, United States
- Province or state: British Columbia, Alaska

Physical characteristics
- Source: Coast Mountains
  - location: British Columbia
- Mouth: Gilbert Bay, Port Snettisham
  - location: 33 miles (53 km) southeast of Juneau, Juneau Borough, Tongass National Forest, Alaska
  - coordinates: 57°57′26″N 133°52′54″W
  - elevation: 0 ft (0 m)
- Length: 50 mi (80 km)

The Whiting River is a stream, about 50 miles (80 km) long, in the U.S. state of Alaska and the Canadian province of British Columbia. It enters the waters of Stephens Passage at the Borough of Juneau in the Alaska Panhandle between the mouths of the Taku and Stikine Rivers. The main tributary of the Whiting is the South Whiting. The river's basin is at the northern end of the Stikine Icecap The river crosses the international boundary at 58°11′00″N 133°13′00″W. Its origin is in the Chechidla Range, and its terminus is at Gilbert Bay, which empties into Stephens Passage.

In 1888, Lieutenant Commander C. M. Thomas of the U.S. Navy (USN) named the river for assistant surgeon Robert Whiting, USN, a member of his surveying party.

== See also ==
- List of rivers of Alaska
- List of rivers of British Columbia
