= Brassiere Hills =

Mountain summits in Alaska, United States

- Location within Alaska

Highest point
- Elevation: 2,333 ft (711 m)
- Coordinates: 58°27′38″N 134°02′44″W

Geography
- Location: Juneau, Alaska, United States
- Parent range: Juneau Icefield / Boundary Ranges
- Topo map: USGS Juneau B-1

The Brassiere Hills are a pair of summits in the City and Borough of Juneau, Alaska, United States. It is located at the northern end of Taku Inlet, 4.5 miles (7.2 km) north of Taku Point and 18 miles (29 km) northeast of the city of Juneau. The peaks are 2,405 feet (733 m) and 2,360 feet (719 m) high and a stream named Zipper Creek runs between them.

Ice thickness studies of Taku Glacier were conducted near the hills in 1989, 1990, and 1993.

Nancy Bartley of The Seattle Times attributes the naming to photographer Austin Post.

The name was noted by the United States Geological Survey on 1948 and 1962 topographical maps of the Juneau area, but it was removed prior to the latter edition's publication. It later appeared on a 1997 USGS map. It was entered into the Geographic Names Information System on March 31, 1981.
