= Deaf climbers =

Deaf climbers use alternative ways such as commands, hand tactics, and sometimes an Interpreter or hearing aid to assist them with their climb. They are capable of all types of climbing including bouldering, which consists of no ropes and usually a crash pad. Top roping, which uses a pre set anchor at the summit of your climb as well as a belayer who helps manage your climbing rope and your security during your climb. Also lead climbing, which is when the rope is attached to the climber, which the climber then clips onto either pre placed bolt anchors or other temporary anchor devices during the ascent, while the belayer manages the rope as well as the safety of the climber.

== Alternative command methods ==
Climbers rely a lot on vocal commands. Vocal commands are used to assist in climbs in terms of navigation, safety, as well as it being the main source of communication between climbers. The only difference for deaf climbers that separates them from hearing climbers is that they cannot use vocal commands. Alternative command methods such as tugging of rope, either softly or gently, identifies with a certain command. The number of times as well as strength of the tug is how the command will be identified. This may take a lot of practice and vary within groups or individual deaf climbers so it is important to be clear of what amount of tugs as well as what the strength of each tug stands for what command.

Sign language may be used as a command method. This is the language of deaf individuals who are in the Deaf community. There are many people who are deaf who do not use sign language. This language is a visual language and does not require any vocal usage. Sign language uses facial and body gestures as well to distinguish meanings.

Sign language is not a universal language; it does vary within certain parts of the world, therefore for deaf climbers climbing outside of their region amongst other deaf climbers, this command method may be an obstacle when climbing.

Hearing aids work on individuals who have some type of hearing loss but not on individuals who are completely deaf. They could be worn on one ear or both, mainly depending on the amount of hearing loss as well as which ear the hearing loss occurs from. A hearing aid amplifies sounds around an individual which can help make vocal commands during climbing much clearer for an individual with hearing loss.

Another alternative command method that is very common especially in the Deaf community is the assistance of sign language interpreters. Sign language interpreters can help deaf climbers with communicating to those who are not deaf and assist deaf climbers when vocal commands are given from the belayer.

== Deaf climber population ==
There are not any demographics for the population of deaf climbers.

== Accomplished deaf climbers ==
American climbers-adventurers Scott Lehmann and Shayna Unger made history atop Mount Everest on May 22, 2023. Unger and Lehmann became only the third and fourth deaf people to summit Mount Everest. Unger is the first deaf woman ever. The second deaf person to reach the top was Malaysian national Muhammad Hawari Hashim – who scaled the peak on May 18. 2023. Until 2023, only one deaf person had ever summited Everest – Japanese climber Satoshi Tamura, an alpine skier who succeeded on his third attempt in 2016.

Nicole Bringolf, a deaf ski mountaineer, has been climbing since she first joined the Aspen Mountain Rescue Group in 1991 and spent two months on the Juneau Icefield with the Juneau Icefield Research Program in 1992. She spent several years in Alaska climbing various peaks including first attempt on Denali and Mt. Mather. She solo climbed Mt. Shasta, Mt. Williamson, Mt. Russell, and Mt. Whitney in the Sierra Nevada Mountains. In Switzerland, she climbed Dufourspitze and Breithorn. Recently, she climbed the Grand Teton via Owen-Spaudling route in 2025 one year after getting a total knee replacement.

Two deaf climbers, Alec Naiman from New York, and Paul Stefurak from Washington, reached the summit of Mount Rainier at 14,410 feet in July 1981. The summit attempt was completed alongside five blind climbers, a man with an artificial leg, and a person with epilepsy. Only two individuals in the group did not reach the summit.

Heidi Zimmer was the first deaf woman to reach the summit of Denali in Alaska. She is the first deaf individual to reach the summit of Kilimanjaro in Africa, as well as Mount Elbrus in the Republic of Russia which has an elevation of 18,510 feet. She has a goal of completing the seven summits which consist of the highest peak in each continent. This is considered a huge accomplishment in the climbing world.

Yasayuki Okobu, a Japanese climber became the first deaf climber to summit Mount Vinson in Antarctica. He is not only the first deaf individual to summit Mount Vinson, but also the first to attempt it. He completed this climb in January 2009, along with Rob Jarvis and numerous guides from Adventure Network International.

== Organizations involved with Deaf climbers ==
Many organizations across the world are involved with deaf individuals and climbing, because being a deaf climber causes a need for alternative methods to climbing, these organizations usually use one or more of these methods.

The Aspen Camp for the Deaf and Hard of Hearing is a camp dedicated to deaf and hard of hearing kids and the outdoors. This organization focuses on climbing and uses this sport to encourage the kids and help them gain skills. The instructor, named Clint Woosley, who is the coordinator of the camp program as well is deaf along with some campers. Some of them are hearing and know sign language either through studies or a deaf family member, and some have hearing loss but can still hear and talk.

Community services for the deaf hosts a climb a thon which provides services for individuals who are deaf in the Cincinnati area. This organization is a non-profit organization and provides various services for the deaf. They provide classes as well as outings to places such as climbing gyms and other outdoors events.

Climb France is an organization run by climbers in the area of France and Sardinia. The services Climb France provides include climbing courses and guided tours throughout the mountains of France. In January 2009, Climb France teamed up with interpreters who were climbers themselves and guided a group of deaf climbers.

Splore is a non-profit organization who provides services for individuals who are disabled. This organization works with various other organizations that are involved with the outdoors. Splore provides custom trips as well as classes for disabled people in numerous activities such as whitewater rafting, skiing and snowboarding, golf and climbing.

Outward Bound is a non-profit organization which has schools around the world that provides programs indoors as well as out, the programs they provide all have to do with personal growth and skills, mental and physical growth, overall personal development.

Outward Bound deals with numerous kinds of groups across the world despite disability, economic status, or other special needs. Outward Bound takes their groups to the wilderness, which is sometimes a day or overnight trip, and provide them with challenges that they are to face alone or through teamwork. They cater to students as well as teachers.

Adventure Network International is based in the United States and is a guide group that handles expeditions in Antarctica. They guide trips such as safaris, private flights, and climbing. Adventure Network International is the only company in the world which guides explorers through expeditions in the Antarctic.

== Sources ==
- fda.gov
- http://library.gallaudet.edu/Library/Deaf_Research_Help/Frequently_Asked_Questions_(FAQs)/Statistics_on_Deafness/Deaf_Population_of_the_United_States.html
- http://www.hearingspeechdeaf.com/about/news/csdclimb/index.asp
