= Slanting Peak =

Mountain in Alaska, United States

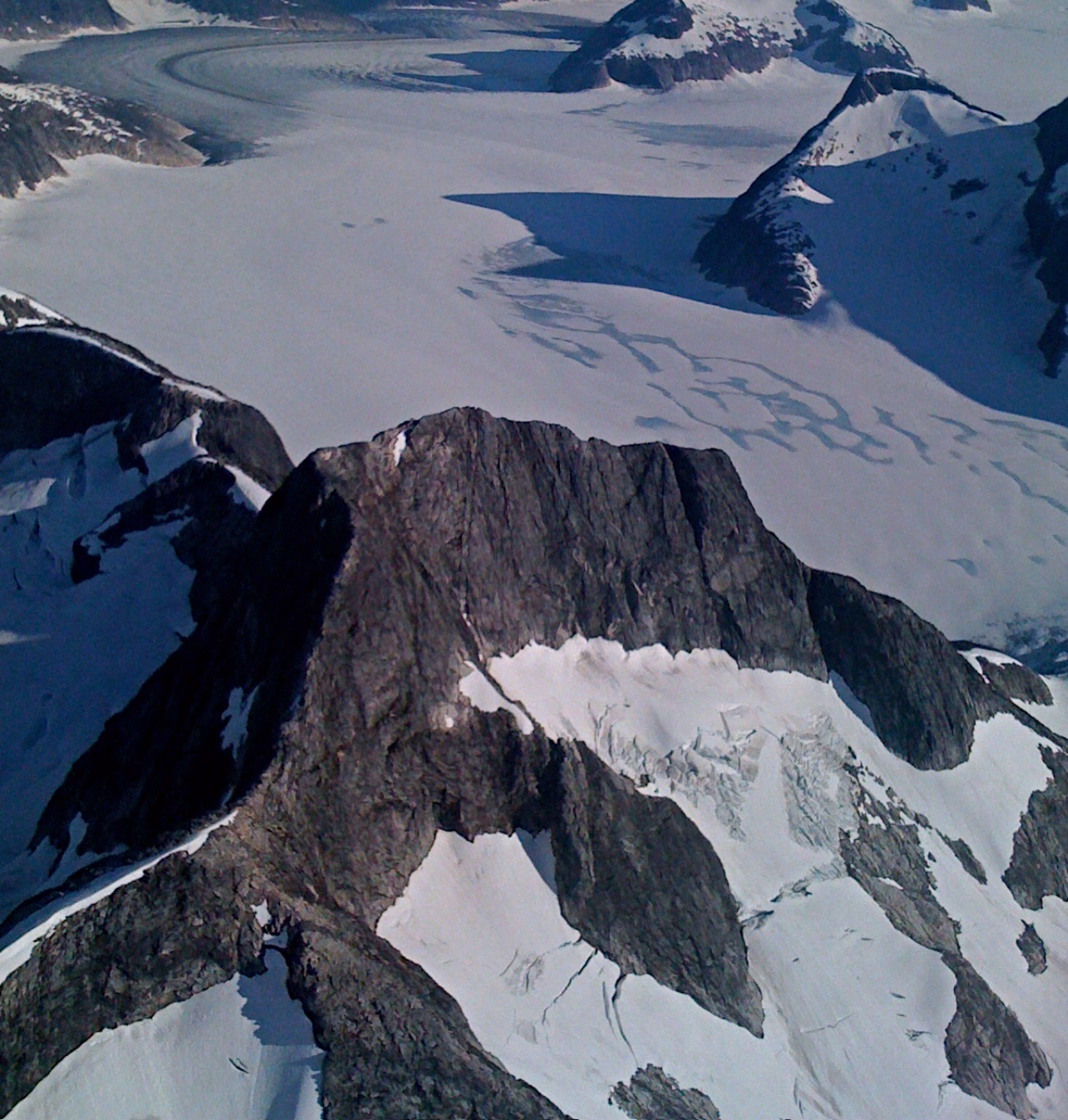
- Aerial view of north aspect, with Norris Glacier

Highest point
- Elevation: 5,200+ ft (1,580+ m)
- Prominence: 1,600 ft (490 m)
- Parent peak: Amherst Peak
- Isolation: 5.53 mi (8.90 km)
- Coordinates: 58°32′12″N 134°13′00″W

Geography
- Location within Alaska
- Location: Tongass National Forest; Juneau Borough; Alaska, United States
- Parent range: Coast Mountains; Boundary Ranges; Juneau Icefield
- Topo map: USGS Juneau C-1

Slanting Peak is a 5,200+ ft (1,580+ m) glaciated mountain summit located in the Boundary Ranges of the Coast Mountains, in the U.S. state of Alaska. The peak is situated in the southern portion of the Juneau Icefield, 18 mi (29 km) northeast of Juneau, and 2.4 mi (4 km) northeast of Guardian Mountain, which is its nearest neighbor. Slanting Peak is surrounded by the North Branch Norris Glacier to its west, and Taku Glacier on the east, and set on land managed by Tongass National Forest. This peak's descriptive name was published in 1960 by the U.S. Geological Survey.

== Climate ==
Based on the Köppen climate classification, Slanting Peak is located in a subarctic climate zone, with long, cold, snowy winters, and cool summers. Weather systems coming off the Gulf of Alaska are forced upwards by the Coast Mountains (orographic lift), causing heavy precipitation in the form of rainfall and snowfall. Temperatures can drop below −20 °C with wind chill factors below −30 °C. The month of July offers the most favorable weather to view or climb Slanting Peak.

== Gallery ==
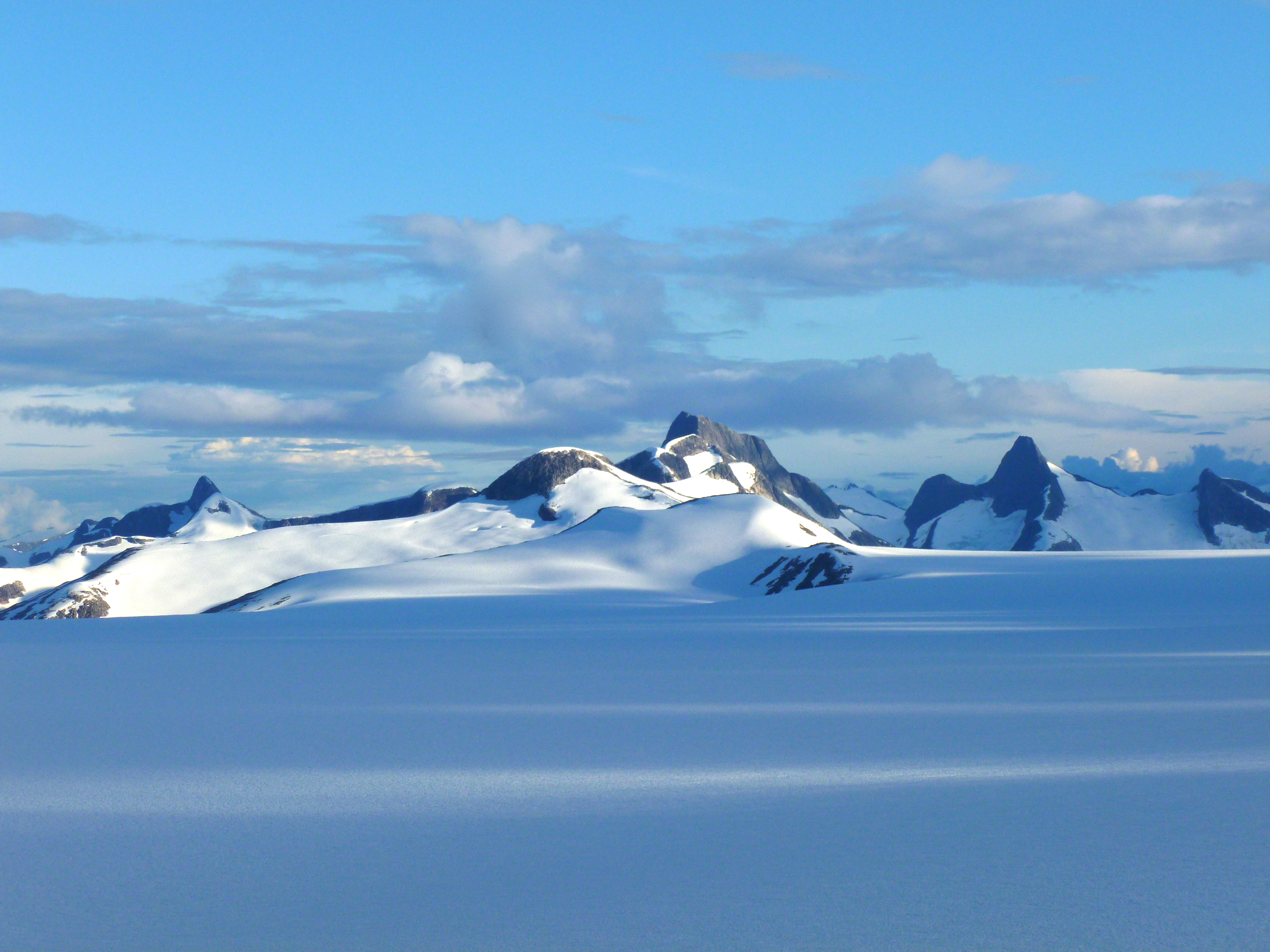
Slanting Peak centered, with Guardian Mountain to right

== See also ==
- Geospatial summary of the High Peaks/Summits of the Juneau Icefield
- Geography of Alaska
