= Zipper Creek (Alaska) =

Coordinates: 58°26′57″N 134°01′05″W

Location
- Country: United States
- State: Alaska

Physical characteristics
- Source
  - location: Brassiere Hills, Juneau, Alaska
- Mouth
  - location: Taku Inlet
  - elevation: 259 ft (79 m)

Zipper Creek is a river in the City and Borough of Juneau, Alaska, United States. Located 19 miles (31 km) northeast of the city of Juneau, its origin is in the Brassiere Hills. It flows southward past Taku Glacier and ends at the head of Taku Inlet. Nancy Bartley of The Seattle Times attributes the naming to photographer Austin Post.
