= Tidewater glacier cycle =

Behavior of glaciers that terminate at the sea

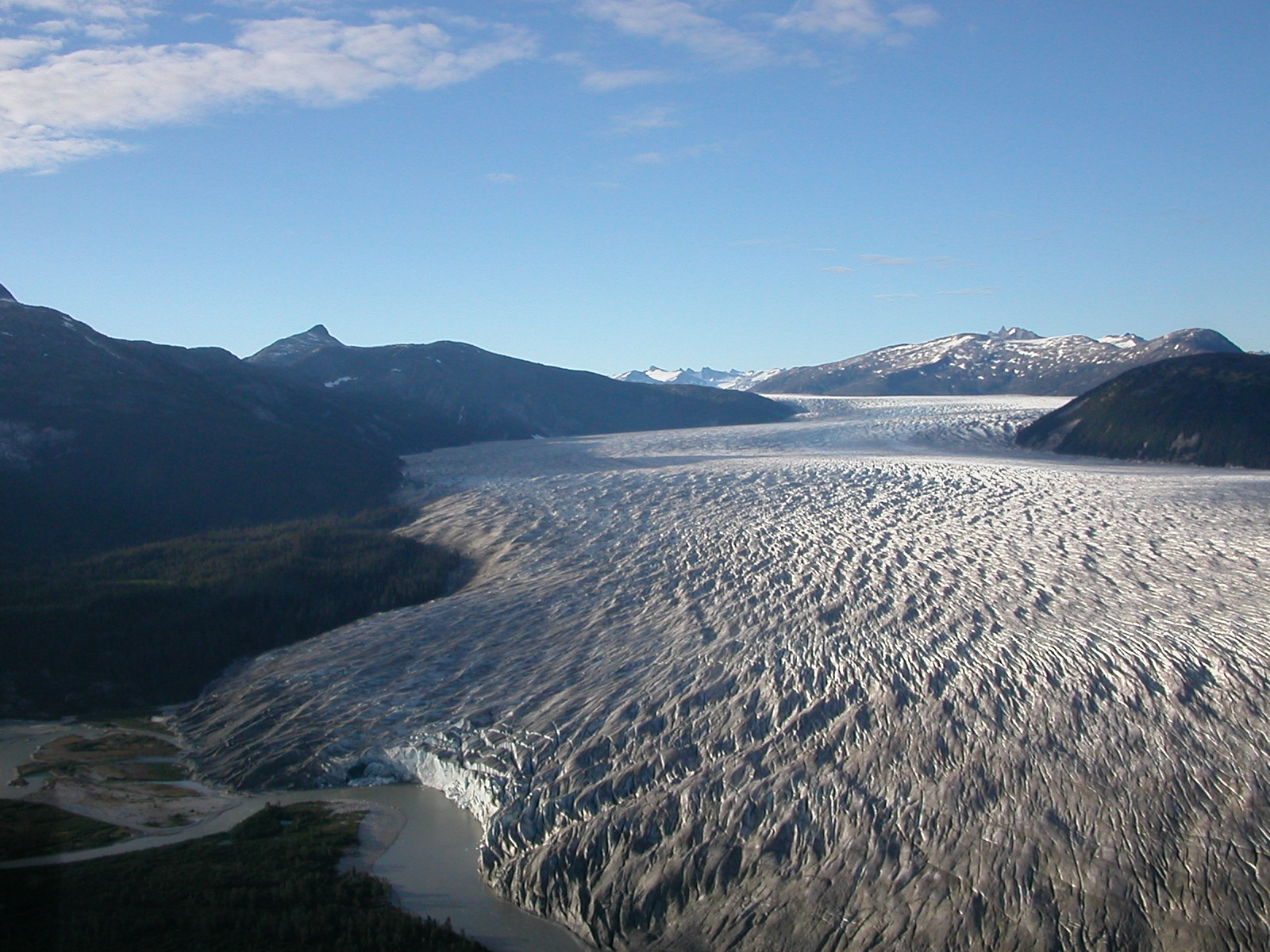
The Taku Glacier.

The tidewater glacier cycle is the typically centuries-long behavior of tidewater glaciers that consists of recurring periods of advance alternating with rapid retreat and punctuated by periods of stability. During portions of its cycle, a tidewater glacier is relatively insensitive to climate change.

== Calving rate of tidewater glaciers ==
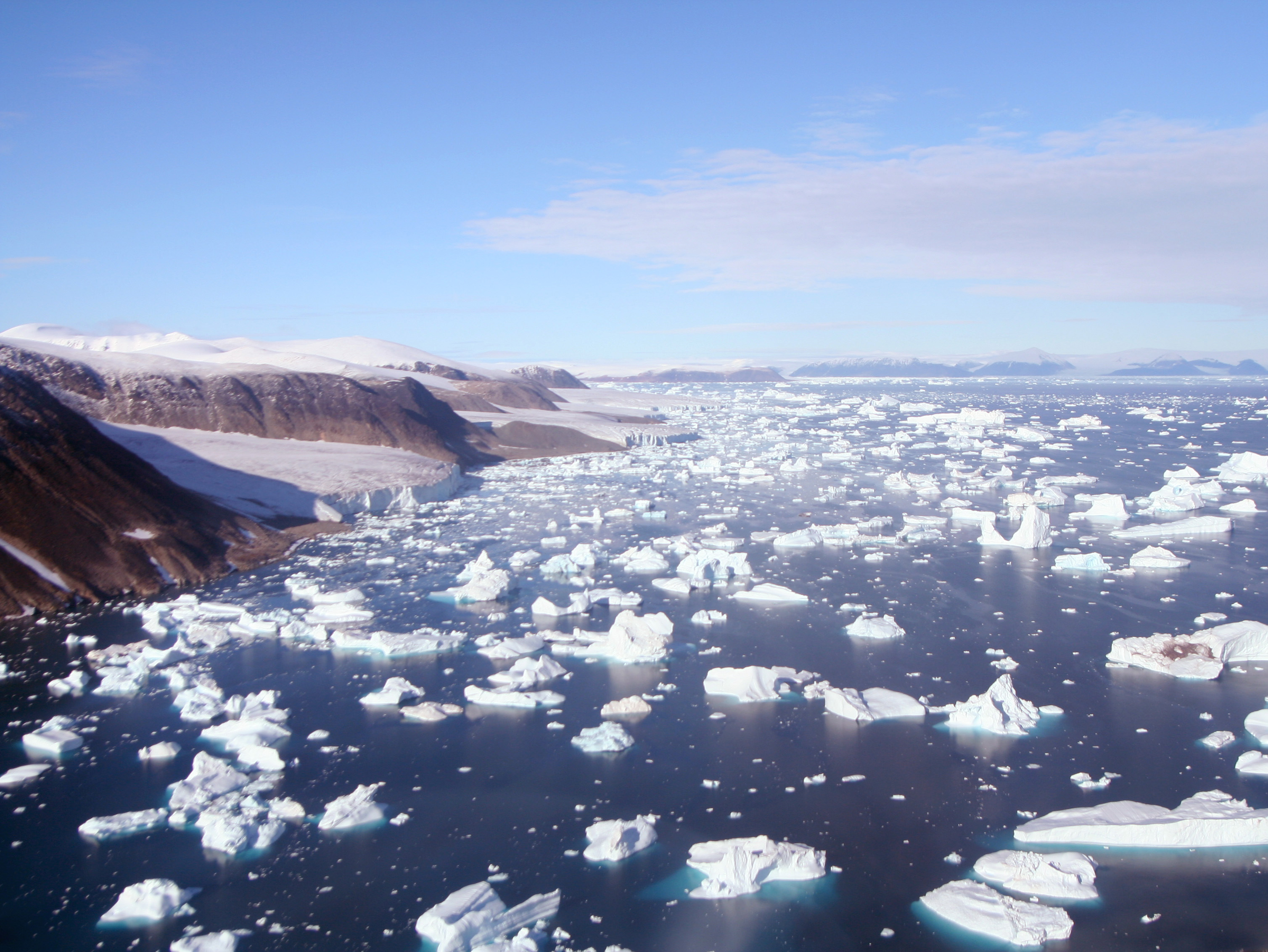
Iceberg calving from several tidewater glaciers, Cape York, Greenland

While climate is the main factor affecting the behavior of all glaciers, additional factors affect calving (iceberg-producing) tidewater glaciers. These glaciers terminate abruptly at the ocean interface, with large pieces of the glacier fracturing and separating, or calving, from the ice front as icebergs.

Climate change causes a shift in the equilibrium line altitude (ELA) of a glacier. This is the imaginary line on a glacier, above which snow accumulates faster than it ablates, and below which, the reverse is the case. This altitude shift, in turn, prompts a retreat or advance of the terminus toward a new steady-state position. However, this change in terminus behavior for calving glaciers is also a function of resulting changes in fjord geometry, and calving rate at the glacier terminus as it changes position.

Calving glaciers are different from land terminating glaciers in the variation in velocity along their length. Land terminating glacier velocities decline as the terminus is approached. Calving glaciers accelerate at the terminus. A declining velocity near the terminus slows the glacier response to climate. An accelerating velocity at the front enhances the speed of the glaciers response to climate or glacier dynamic changes. This is observed in Svalbard, Patagonia and Alaska. A calving glacier requires more accumulation area than a land terminating glacier to offset this higher loss from calving.

The calving rate is largely controlled by the depth of the water and the glacier velocity at the calving front. The process of calving provides an imbalance in forces at the front of the glaciers, that raises velocity. The depth of the water at the glacier front is a simple measure that allows estimation of calving rate, but is the amount of flotation of the glacier at the front that is the specific physical characteristic that is important.

Water depth at the glacier terminus is the key variable in predicting calving of a tidewater glacier. Debris flux and sediment recycling at the glacier grounding-line, particularly rapid in the temperate glaciers of Alaska, can alter this depth, acting as a second-order control on terminus fluctuations. This effect contributes to the insensitivity of a glacier to climate when its terminus is either retreating or advancing in deep water.

Austin Post was one of the first to propose that water depth at the calving margin strongly affects the rate of iceberg calving. Glaciers that terminate on a morainal shoal are generally stable, but once a glacier retreats into water that deepens as the ice front recedes, calving rate increases rapidly and results in drastic retreat of the terminus. Using data collected from 13 Alaskan tidewater calving glaciers, Brown et al. (1982) derived the following relationship between calving speed and water depth: $V_C = CH_w + D$, where $V_C$ is the mean calving speed (m⋅a^{−1}), $C$ is a calving coefficient (27.1±2 a^{−1}), $H_w$ is the mean water depth at glacier front (m) and $D$ is a constant (0 m⋅a^{−1}). Pelto and Warren (1991) found a similar calving relationship with tidewater glaciers observed over longer time periods, with slightly reduced calving rate to the mainly summer rates noted by Brown et al. (1982).

Calving is an important form of ablation for glaciers that terminate in freshwater, also. Funk and Röthlisberger determined a relationship between calving speed and water depth based on analysis of six glaciers that calve into lakes. They found that the same basic calving relationship developed for tidewater calving glaciers was true for freshwater calving glaciers, only the calving coefficients led to calving rates 10% of that for tidewater glaciers.

== Tidewater glacier phases ==
Observations of Alaskan tidewater calving glaciers prompted Austin Post to describe the tidewater calving glacier advance/retreat cycle: (1) advancing, (2) stable-extended, (3) drastically retreating, or (4) stable-retracted. The following is a detailed review of the tidewater glacier cycle derived by Post, with numerous cited examples, the cycle is based on observations of temperate tidewater glaciers in Alaska, not outlet glaciers from large ice sheets or polar glaciers.

The accumulation area ratio of a glacier, AAR, is the percentage of a glacier that is a snow-covered accumulation zone at the end of the summer melt season. This percentage for large Alaskan glaciers is between 60 and 70 for non-calving glaciers, 70–80 for moderately calving glaciers and up to 90 for very high calving rate glaciers. By using accumulation area ratio (AAR) data for Alaskan tidewater calving glaciers, Pelto (1987) and Viens (1995) produced models showing that climate acts as a first-order control on the advance/retreat cycle of calving glaciers during most of the advance retreat cycle, but there are climate insensitive periods as well. Pelto (1987) examined the terminus behavior of 90 Alaskan glaciers and found that the terminus behavior of all 90 were correctly predicted based on the AAR and calving rate.

=== Advancing ===
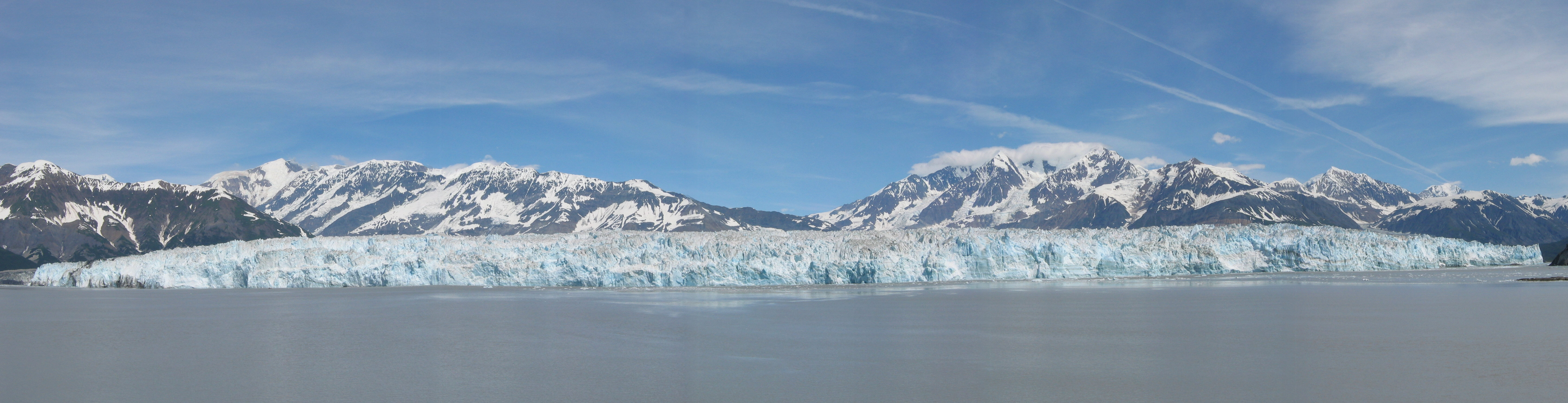
The Hubbard Glacier

If we begin at the stable retracted position at the end of a tidewater glacier cycle the glacier will have a moderate calving rate and a high AAR, above 70. The glacier will build a terminus shoal of sediment further reducing the calving rate. This will improve the glacier mass balance and the glacier can begin to advance due to this change or an increase in ice flux to the terminus due to increasing snowfall or reduced snow melt. As the advance proceeds the terminus shoal will be pushed in front of the glacier and continue to build, keeping the calving rate low. In the case of the most glaciers such as the Taku Glacier the glacier will eventually build a terminus shoal that is above water and calving will essentially cease. This will eliminate this loss of ice from the glacier and the glacier can continue to advance. Taku Glacier and Hubbard Glacier have been in this phase of the cycle. Taku Glacier which has been advancing for 120 years no longer calves. Hubbard Glacier still has a calving front. The glacier will then expand until the AAR is between 60 and 70 and equilibrium of the non-calving glacier is achieved. The glacier is not very sensitive to climate during the advance as its AAR is quite high, when the terminus shoal is limiting calving.

=== Stable-extended ===
At the maximum extended position the glacier is once again sensitive to changing climate. Brady Glacier and Baird Glacier are examples of glaciers currently at this point. Brady Glacier has been thinning during the last two decades due to the higher equilibrium line altitudes accompanying warmer conditions in the region, and its secondary termini have begun to retreat. A glacier can remain at this position for sometime, a century at least in the case of Brady Glacier. Usually substantial thinning occurs before retreat from the shoal commences. This allowed the prediction in 1980, by the United States Geological Survey (USGS), of the retreat of the Columbia Glacier from its terminus shoal. The glacier had remained on this shoal throughout the entire 20th century. The USGS was monitoring the glacier due to its proximity to Valdez, Alaska, the port for crude oil export from the Alaskan Pipeline. At some point a decline in mass balance will trigger a retreat from the shoal into deeper water at which point calving will ensue. Based on the recent thinning it is suggested that Brady Glacier is poised to begin retreat.

=== Drastically retreating ===
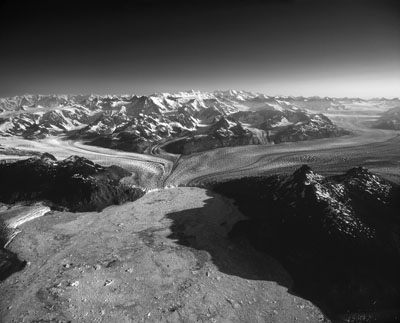
Columbia Glacier in 2004

The calving rate will increase as the glacier retreats from the shoal into the deeper fjord just cleared by the glacier during advance. The water depth initially increases as the glacier retreats from the shoal, causing ever more rapid glacier flow, calving and retreat. A glacier is comparatively insensitive to climate during this calving retreat. However, in the case of San Rafael Glacier, Chile, a switch from retreat (1945–1990) to advance (1990–1997) was noted. Current examples of this retreat are Columbia Glacier and Guyot Glacier. The most famous recent example of this is the large retreat of Glacier Bay and Icy Bay glaciers in Alaska that occurred rapidly via this process. Muir Glacier retreated 33 km from 1886 to 1968 featuring extensive calving the entire time. It reversed its retreat briefly 1890—1892. In 1968, Muir Glacier was still 27 km long, less than half of its length in 1886. The retreat continued an additional 6.5 km by 2001. Today, the glacier is near the head of its fjord and with minimal calving the glacier may be stable at this retracted position.

The best current example is illustrated by the United States Geological Survey study of Columbia Glacier. They noted that the average calving rate from Columbia Glacier increased from 3 km^{3}⋅a^{−1} in the second half of 1983 to 4 km^{3}⋅a^{−1} during the first nine months of 1984. This rate was four times greater than that measured at the end of 1977 and increased again in 1985. The glacier flow, i.e., the movement of the ice toward the sea, also increased, it was inadequate to keep pace with the break-up and expulsion of icebergs. The increase in speed instead seemed to just feed the ever faster conveyor to the terminus for iceberg production. This prompted the USGS to predict that the glacier would retreat 32 km before stabilizing. By 2006, it has retreated 16 km. The water remains deep and the calving rate and glacier velocity very high, indicating retreat will continue. At this point, just like having a balloon payment in an adjustable rate mortgage, the glacier has to pay a whole new portion of its balance via icebergs. The glacier accelerates as flow is enhanced by the calving process; this increases the export of icebergs from the glacier. Large calving retreats are initiated by warming conditions causing ice thinning. The resulting retreat to a new equilibrium conditions can be far more extensive than will be regained during the next advance stage. A good example of this is Muir Glacier.

Next to Glacier Bay, Icy Bay has had the most extensive retreat. At the beginning of the 20th century, the coastline was nearly straight and the bay non-existent. The entrance of the bay was filled by a tidewater glacier face that calved icebergs directly into the Gulf of Alaska. A century later glacier retreat has opened a multi-armed bay more than 30 miles long. The tidewater glacier has divided into three independent glaciers, Yahtse, Tsaa and Guyot Glacier. Other examples of glaciers currently in the retreat phase are South Sawyer and Sawyer Glaciers in Alaska, retreating 2.1 and 2.3 km respectively from 1961 to 2005.

In Patagonia an example of a rapidly retreating glacier is the Jorge Montt Glacier which drains into Baja Jorge Montt in the Pacific Ocean. The glacier's ice thinning, at low elevations, from 1975 to 2000 reached 18 m⋅a^{−1} at the lowest elevations. The glacier calving front experienced a major retreat of 8.5 km in those 25 years as a result of rapid thinning .

=== Stable-retracted ===
At some point the glacier reaches a pinning point where calving is reduced due to a fjord narrowing or shoaling and the glacier's AAR is near 100. This is occurring with LeConte Glacier and Yahtse Glacier. Le Conte Glacier currently has an AAR of 90, is at a retracted position and seems likely to be set to advance after building a terminus shoal. The drop in calving rate allows the glacier to reestablish equilibrium.

== Examples of tidewater glacier behavior ==
=== Taku Glacier ===
The Taku Glacier provides a good example of this cycle. It was at its maximum extent near 1750. At this point it had closed off Taku Inlet. Subsequently, calving retreat commenced. By the time John Muir saw the glacier in 1890, it was near its minimum extent, at a location where the fjord narrowed, with deep water in front. About 1900, its AAR of 90 led to the Taku Glacier onset of advance, at the same time that the remaining Juneau Icefield glaciers continued receding. This advance continued at a rate of 88 m⋅a^{−1}, advancing 5.3 km from the 1900 minimum until 1948, all the while building and then riding up on a substantial outwash plain beneath its calving face. After 1948, the now non-calving Taku Glacier, possessed an AAR only slightly reduced (86 and 63). This drove 1.5 km of further advance at a reduced rate of 37 m⋅a^{−1}. In 1990, the Taku Glacier's AAR was 82 high enough, to prompt Pelto and Miller to conclude that the Taku Glacier would continue to advance for the remaining decade of the 20th century. From 1986 to 2005, the equilibrium line altitude on the glacier rose without a significant terminus shift causing the AAR to decline to about 72. Pelto and Miller concluded that the current reduction in rate of advance is since 1970 is attributable to the laterally expanding terminal lobe as opposed to declining mass balance and that the primary force behind the Taku Glacier's advance since about 1900 is due to positive mass balance. Since 2018 retreat has begun at the Taku Glacier, with an overall declining mass balance as well indicating a transition to the retreat phase of the tidewater glacier cycle.

== Effects of climate change ==
The size of tidewater glaciers is such that the tidewater glacier cycle is several hundred years in length. A tidewater glacier is not sensitive to climate during the advancing and drastically retreating phases of its cycle. In the same region, disparate terminus responses are observed amongst tidewater calving glaciers, but not land terminating glaciers. This is exemplified by the 17 major glaciers of the Juneau Icefield, 5 have retreated more than 500 m since 1948, 11 more than 1000 m, and one glacier the Taku has advanced. This difference highlights the unique impacts on terminus behavior of the tidewater glacier cycle, which has caused the Taku Glacier to be insensitive to climate change in the last 60 years. Concurrently, in both Patagonia and Alaska, there are tidewater glaciers that have advanced for a considerable period, tidewater glaciers undergoing rapid retreat and stable tidewater glaciers.

== See also ==
River delta – Silt deposition landform at the mouth of a river
