= Guardian Mountain =

Mountain in Alaska, U.S.

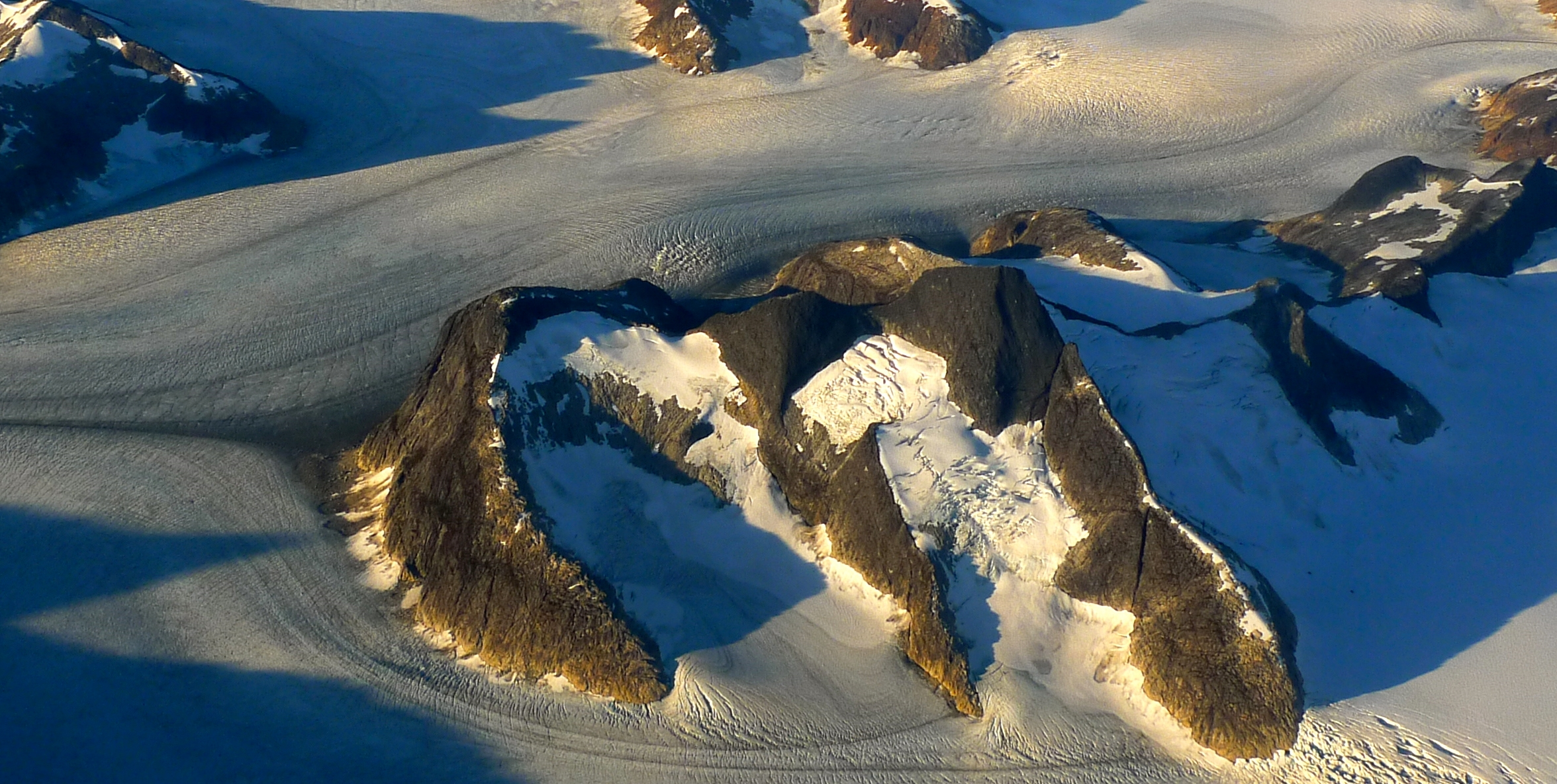
- Aerial view of north aspect

Highest point
- Elevation: 5,060 ft (1,540 m)
- Prominence: 1,060 ft (320 m)
- Parent peak: Slanting Peak
- Isolation: 2.39 mi (3.85 km)
- Coordinates: 58°30′21″N 134°14′48″W

Geography
- Location within Alaska
- Interactive map of Guardian Mountain
- Location: Tongass National Forest; Juneau Borough; Alaska, United States
- Parent range: Coast Mountains; Boundary Ranges; Juneau Icefield
- Topo map: USGS Juneau C-1

Guardian Mountain is a 5,060 ft (1,540 m) glaciated mountain summit located in the Boundary Ranges of the Coast Mountains, in the U.S. state of Alaska. The peak is situated in the southern portion of the Juneau Icefield, 15 mi (24 km) northeast of Juneau, and 2.4 mi (4 km) southwest of Slanting Peak which is its nearest higher neighbor. Guardian Mountain is a nunatak surrounded by the Norris Glacier, on land managed by Tongass National Forest. This peak's local name was published in 1960 by the U.S. Geological Survey.

== Climate ==
Based on the Köppen climate classification, Guardian Mountain is located in a subarctic climate zone, with long, cold, snowy winters, and cool summers. Weather systems coming off the Gulf of Alaska are forced upwards by the Coast Mountains (orographic lift), causing heavy precipitation in the form of rainfall and snowfall. Temperatures can drop below −20 °C with wind chill factors below −30 °C. The month of July offers the most favorable weather to view or climb Guardian Mountain.

== Gallery ==
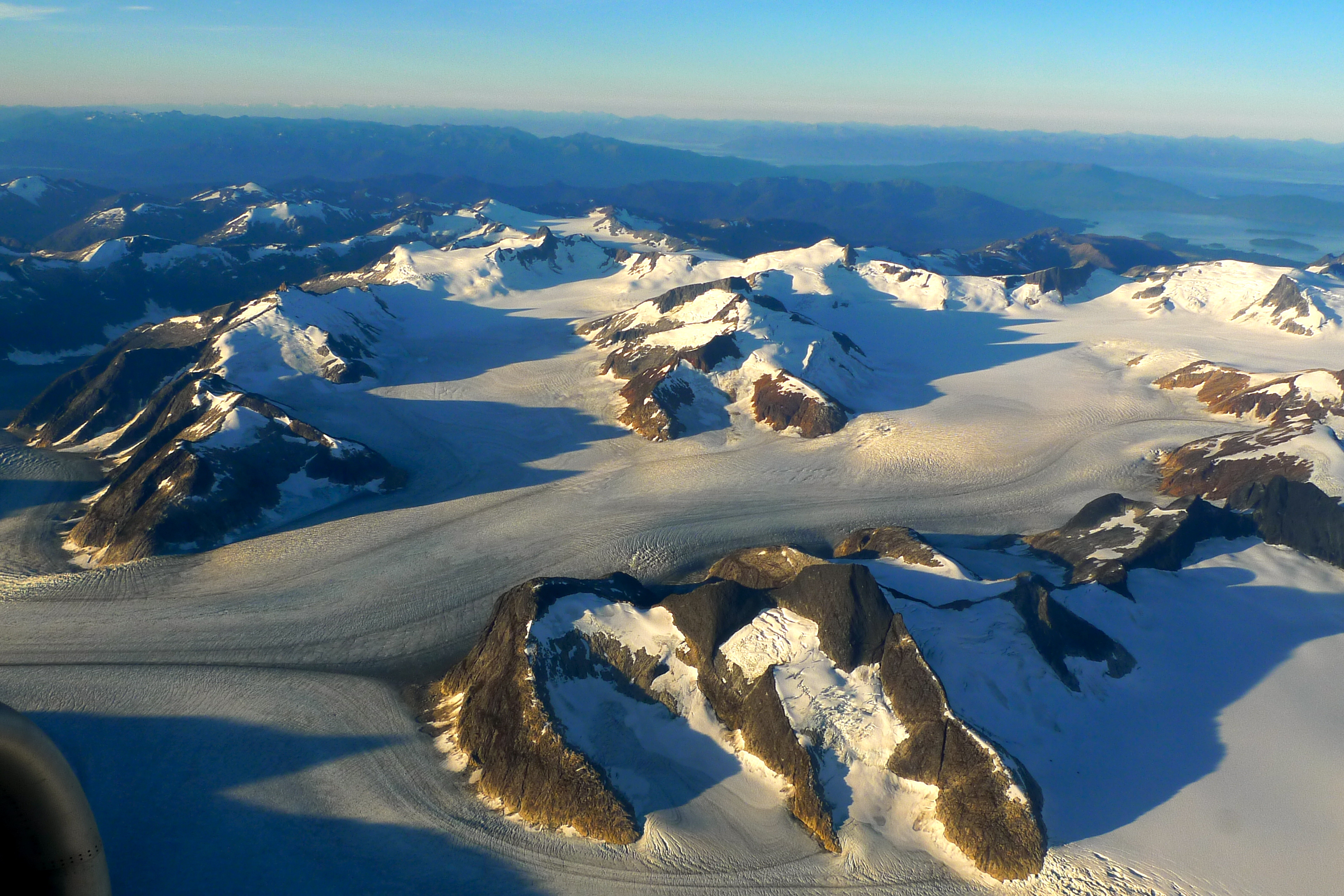
Looking south at Guardian Mountain at bottom of frame

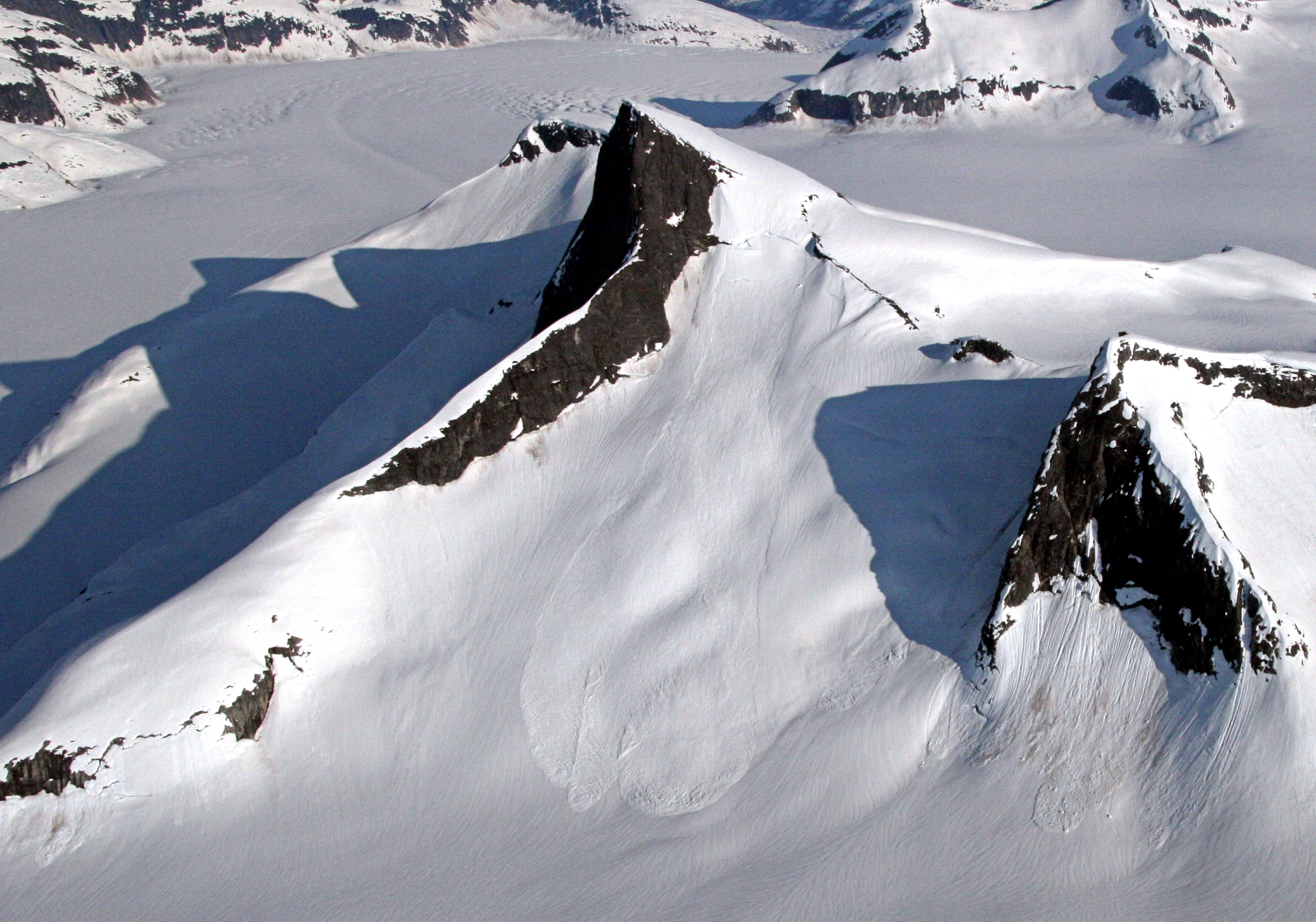
Aerial from northwest

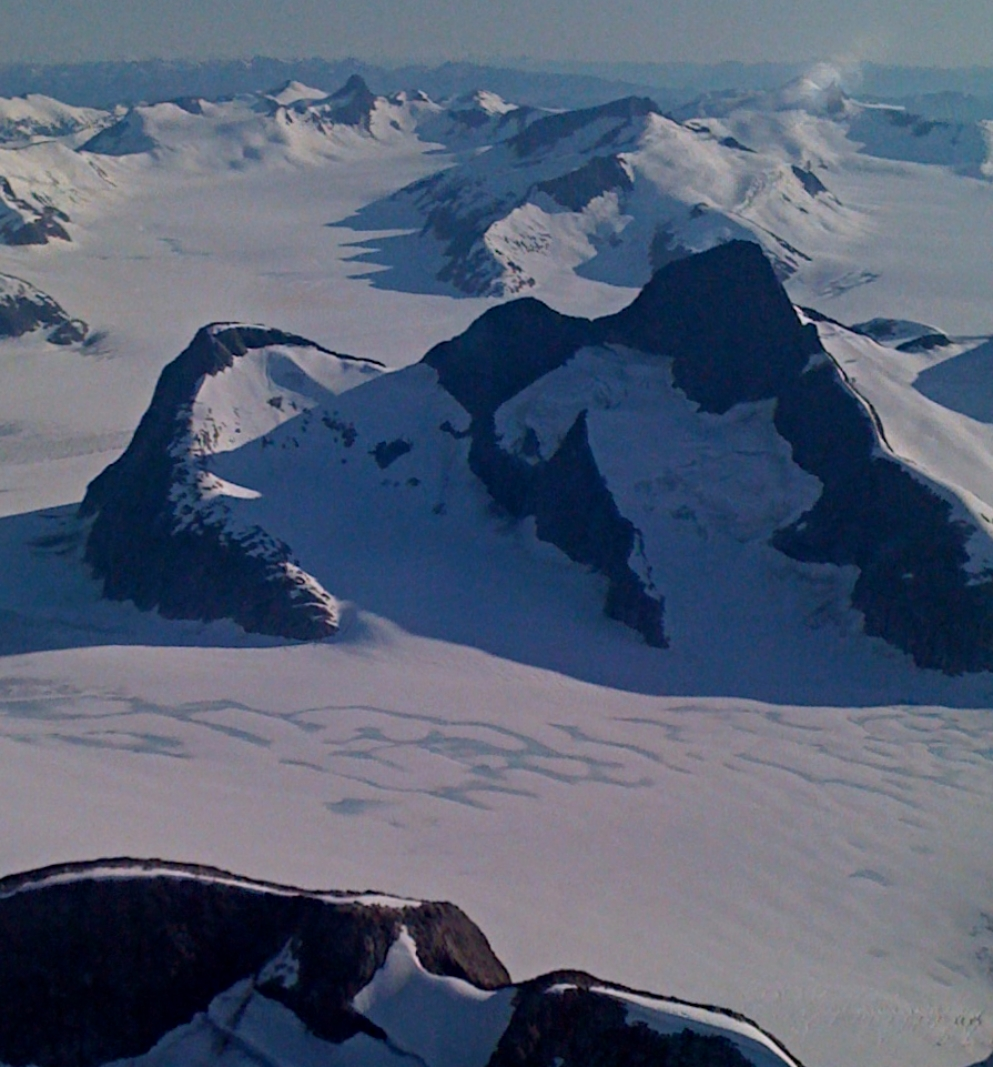
Guardian Mountain

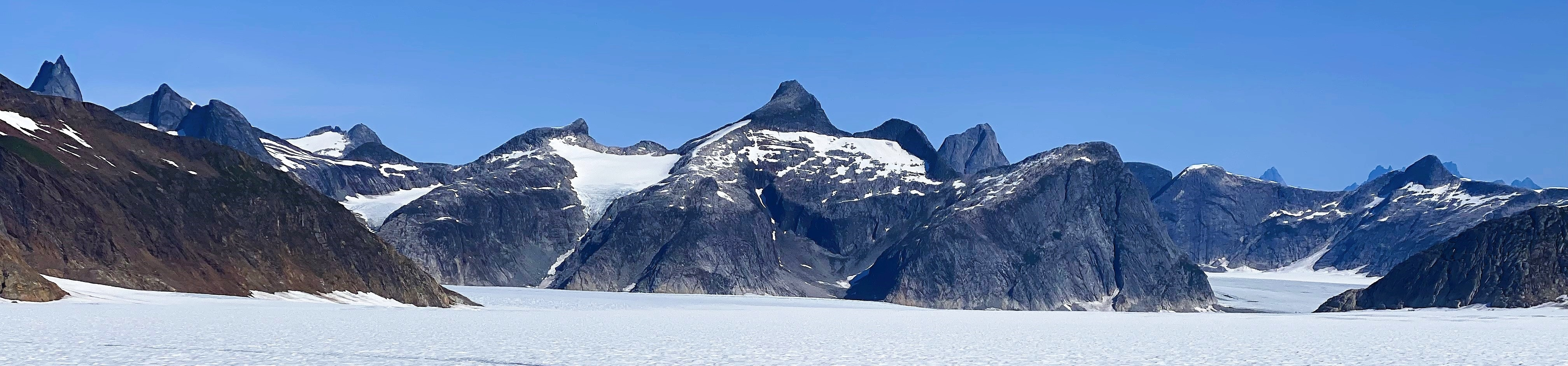
South aspect of Guardian Mountain (centered)

== See also ==
- Geospatial summary of the High Peaks/Summits of the Juneau Icefield
- Geography of Alaska
