= Camp 15 Peak =

Mountain in Alaska, United States

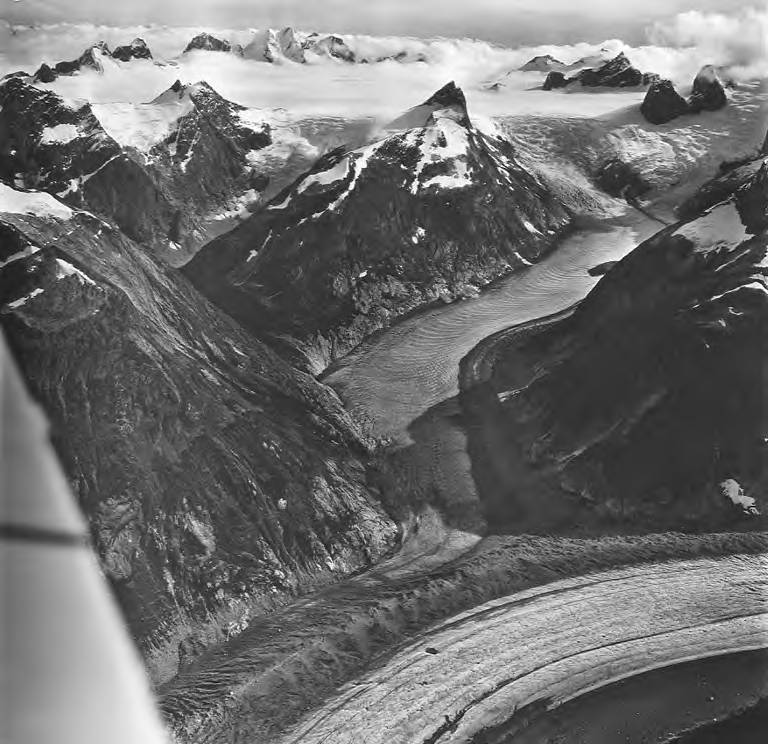
- North aspect of Camp 15 Peak is the sharp peak above center of frame

Highest point
- Elevation: 5,321 ft (1,622 m)
- Coordinates: 58°41′36″N 134°33′48″W

Geography
- Location within Alaska
- Location: Juneau, Alaska, United States
- Parent range: Boundary Ranges
- Topo map: USGS Juneau C-2

Camp 15 Peak is a mountain in the borough of Juneau, Alaska, United States. It is part of the Boundary Ranges of the Coast Mountains in western North America. On the divide east of Battle Glacier, it is located 3 miles southwest of The Tusk and 28 miles north-northwest of the city of Juneau.

The Juneau Icefield Research Program (JIRP) included Camp 15 Peak in its 2001 survey of conditions throughout parts of the Juneau Icefield. The peak was noted by the JIRP in 1964 and entered into the United States Geological Survey's Geographic Names Information System on January 1, 2000.
