= Amherst Peak =

Mountain in Alaska, United States

- Location within Alaska

Highest point
- Elevation: 4,777 ft (1,456 m)
- Coordinates: 58°30′05″N 134°22′24″W

Geography
- Location: Juneau, Alaska, United States
- Parent range: Boundary Ranges
- Topo map: USGS Juneau C-2

Amherst Peak is a mountain in the city and borough of Juneau, Alaska, United States. It is a part of the Boundary Ranges of the Coast Mountains in western North America. It is near the Taku Glacier, 0.2 miles (0.32 km) northwest of Echo Pass and 14 miles (23 km) north of the city of Juneau.

The mountain's name was published locally by the United States Geological Survey (USGS) in 1960; it was collected by the USGS between 1976 and 1981, and entered into the Survey's Geographic Names Information System on March 31, 1981.
