= Llewellyn Glacier =

Glacier in Canada and the United States

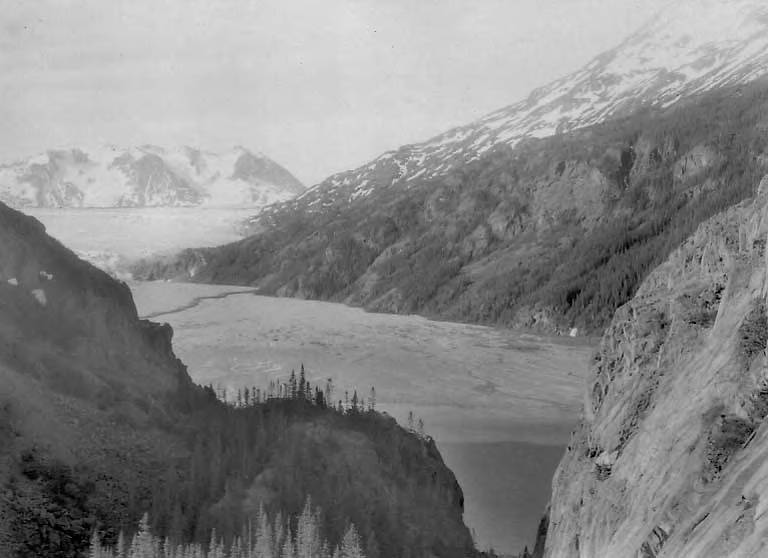
- View of the Llewellyn Glacier through a gorge, between 1916 and 1917

- Location within Alaska
- Interactive map of Llewellyn Glacier
- Coordinates: 59°05′N 134°05′W

The Llewellyn Glacier is a glacier located in British Columbia and Alaska. It is the second-largest glacier in the Juneau Icefield. The glacier has rapidly retreated as of recent, and on June 6, 2018, a large kilometre-sized chunk of the narrow tongue of the glacier broke off and plunged into Atlin Lake.
