= Juneau Icefield Research Program =

Undergraduate Research Program

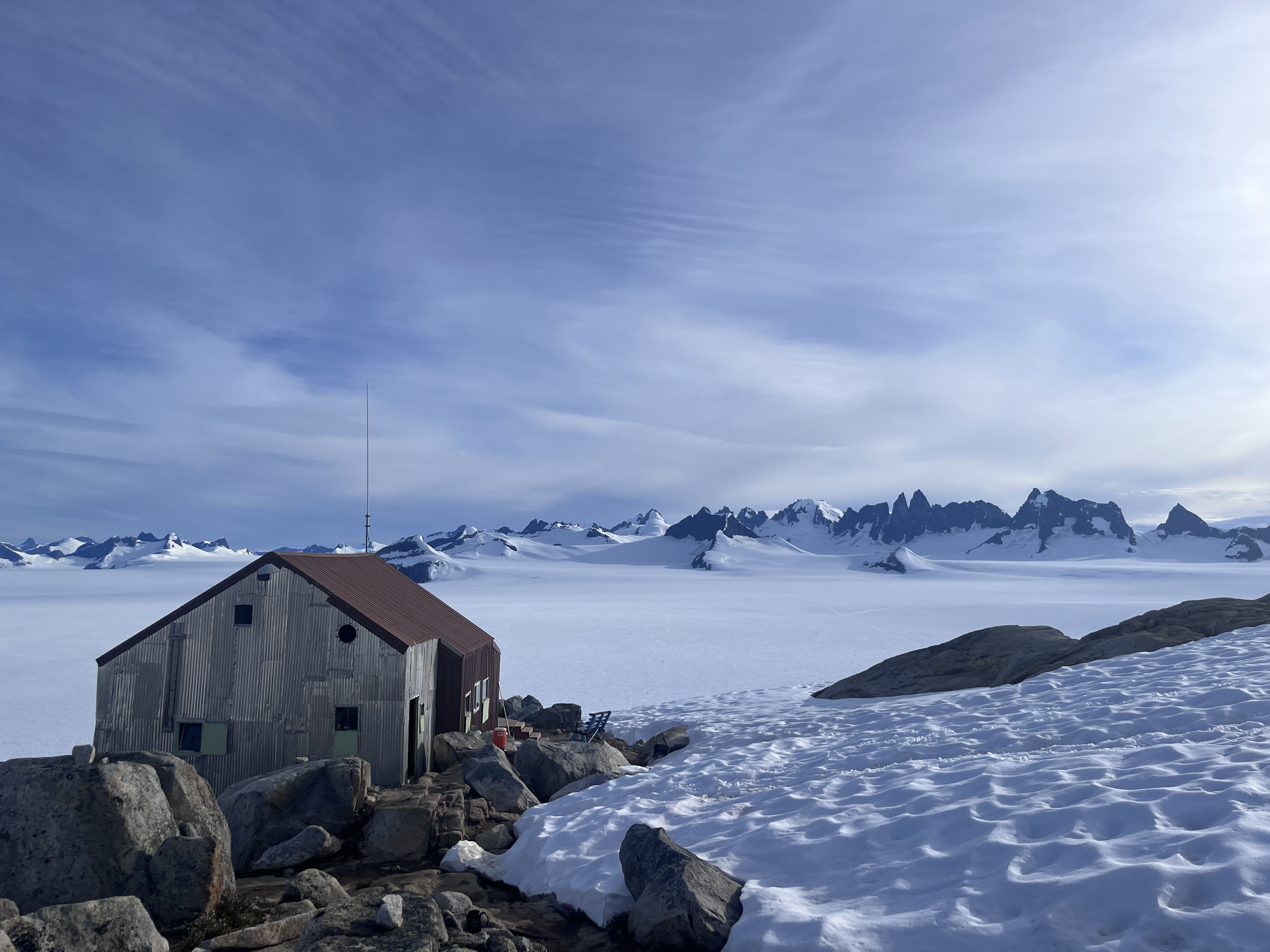
- JIRP field camp 10, on the Taku Glacier.
- Founded: 1946
- Located: Juneau, Alaska
- Field of Study: Glaciology

The Juneau Icefield Research Program (JIRP) is a student research program that focuses on the study of the Juneau Icefield, a collection of glaciers near Juneau, Alaska. Currently run by the Foundation for Glacier and Environmental Research and the University of Colorado, Boulder in collaboration with the University of Maine and the University of Alaska Southeast, it is the longest running icefield research program in North America. Students start in Juneau and traverse the icefield in 8 weeks, ending in Atlin, British Columbia.

== History ==
The Juneau Icefield Research Program was founded in the 1940s by Maynard Miller, a glaciologist on a surveying expedition of the area led by William B. Osgood Field Jr. It was led by Miller until his death in 2014. It is currently run by the University of Colorado, Boulder in collaboration with the University of Maine and the University of Alaska Southeast.

== Research ==
JIRP has collected and analyzed the surface mass-balance of the Juneau Icefield since 1946, primarily focusing on the Lemon Creek Glacier and Taku Glacier. Students in the program learn mountaineering and glacial travel skills while conducting research on the surrounding ice. Although primarily an undergraduate research program, it is open to graduate students and high school students.

== Notable alumni ==
Some notable JIRP alumni include:

- Steve Squyres, geologist and planetary scientist
- Alison Criscitiello, glaciologist and mountaineer
- Austin Post, photographer

== Facilities ==
The JIRP and its parent organization, the Foundation for Glacier and Environmental Research (FGER), maintains several research facilities around the expanse of the Juneau Icefield for the purpose of providing educational and expeditionary experience to students with training in Earth sciences, wilderness survival, and mountaineering skills. These camps are private facilities and are operated in accordance with a U.S. Forest Service Special Use Permit, which stipulates that the facilities can be used only for educational and research purposes by the Juneau Icefield Research Program. Thus all non-JIRP related visitation and use of these camps is prohibited.

FFGR/JIRP Research Facilities Summary
Facility	Established	Reference	CT	Peak	Remarks
C-4	19XX			Camp-4 Peak	Location Approximate
C-8	195X			Mount Moore	Major JIRP Facility
C-9	19XX				on upper Matthes Glacier
C-9B	19XX				Abandoned, location approx., all structures removed
C-10	195X			Vantage Peak	Major JIRP Facility
C-10B	195X			N/A	Virtual Camp, Ski-plane landing area
C-12	19XX				Lower Goat Ridge, abandoned, all structures removed
C-13	19XX			Split Thumb	Location approximate, abandoned, all structures removed
C-14	19XX				Location approximate, abandoned, all structures removed
C-15	19XX			Camp-15 Peak	Abandoned, all structures removed
C-16	195X				Abandoned, all structures removed
C-17	1953			Cairn Peak	Major JIRP Facility
C-17A	196X				At the end of the Lemon Creek Trail
C-18	19XX				Major JIRP Facility
C-18B	19XX				on lower Vaughan Lewis Glacier
C-19	19XX				Watchamacallit Glacier in the Gilkey Canyon near site 18B
C-25	19XX			Mount Nesselrode	
C-26	197X				On a nunatak on the north side of the Llewellyn Glacier
C-29	19XX				On Cathedral Glacier Massif, west of Torres Channel
C-29B	19XX			N/A	At timberline and in alpine tundra zone near Cathedral Glacier terminus
C-30	1968			N/A	Atlin, British Columbia

Notes

FFGR/JIRP Research Facilities

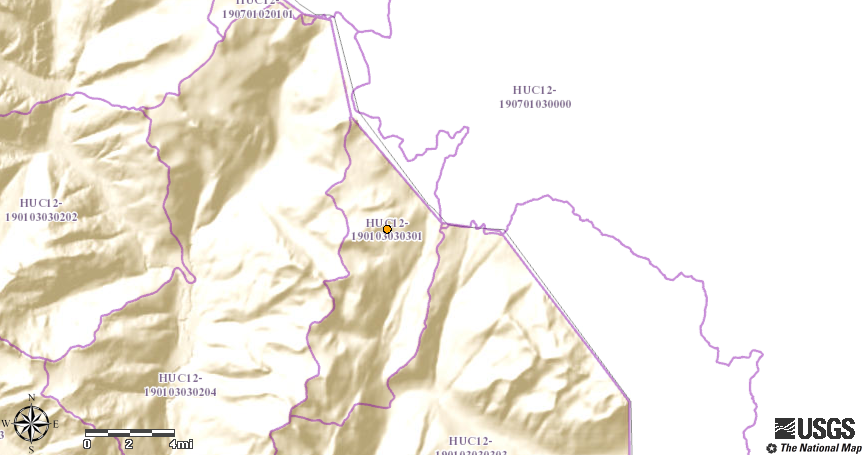
Camp 17A (Awaiting photograph contribution)

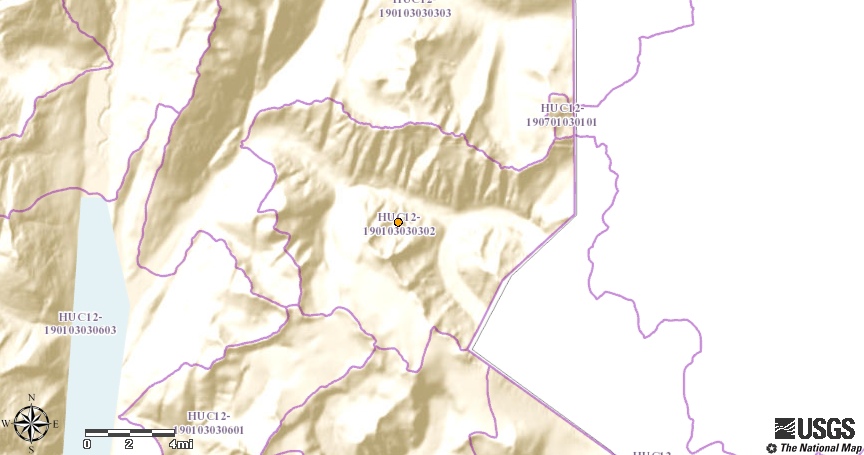
Camp-17 (Awaiting photograph contribution)

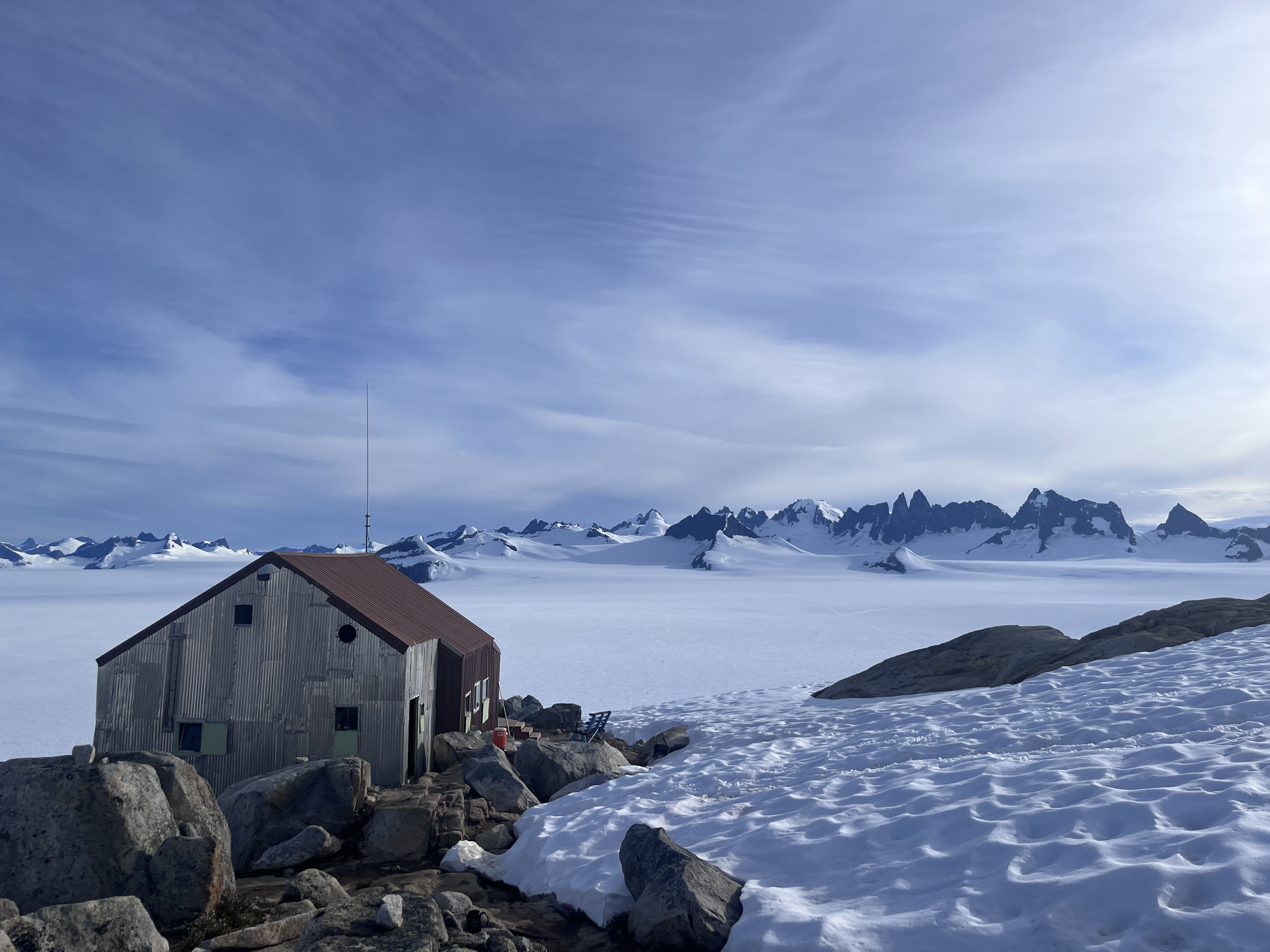
Camp-10

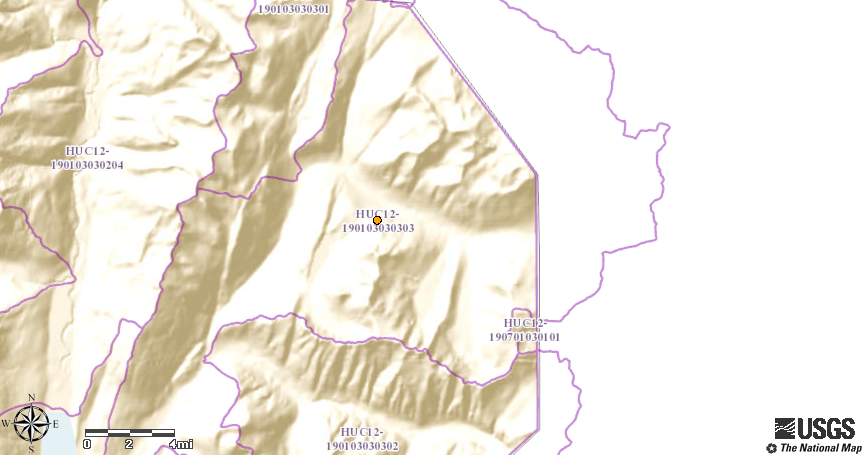
Camp-25 (Awaiting photograph contribution)

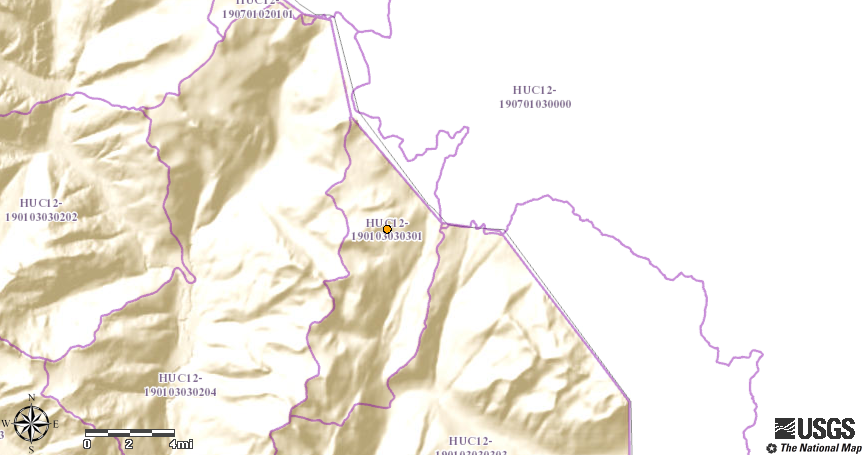
Camp 8 (Awaiting photograph contribution)

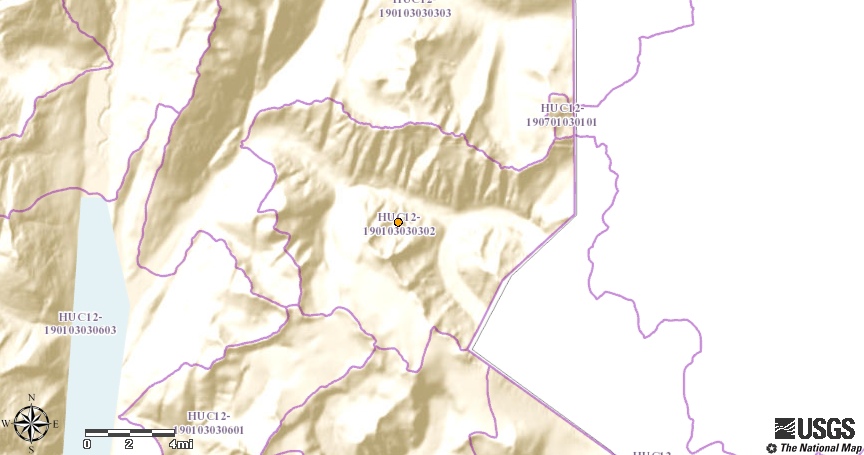
Camp-18 (Awaiting photograph contribution)

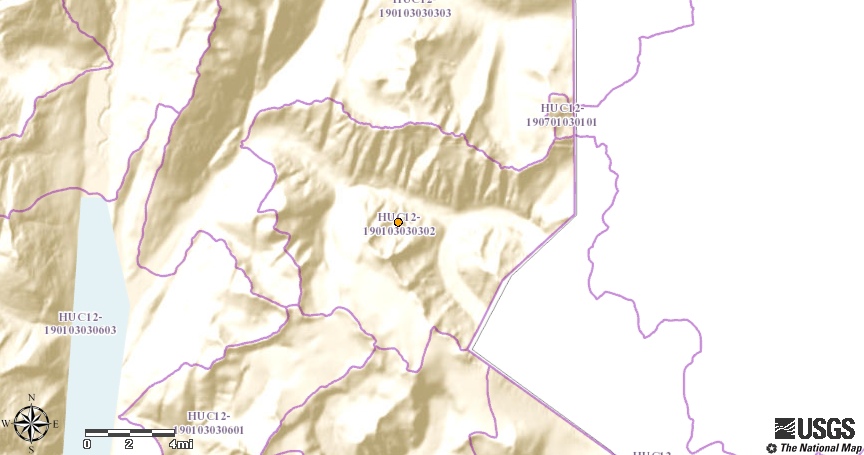
Camp-26 (Awaiting photograph contribution)

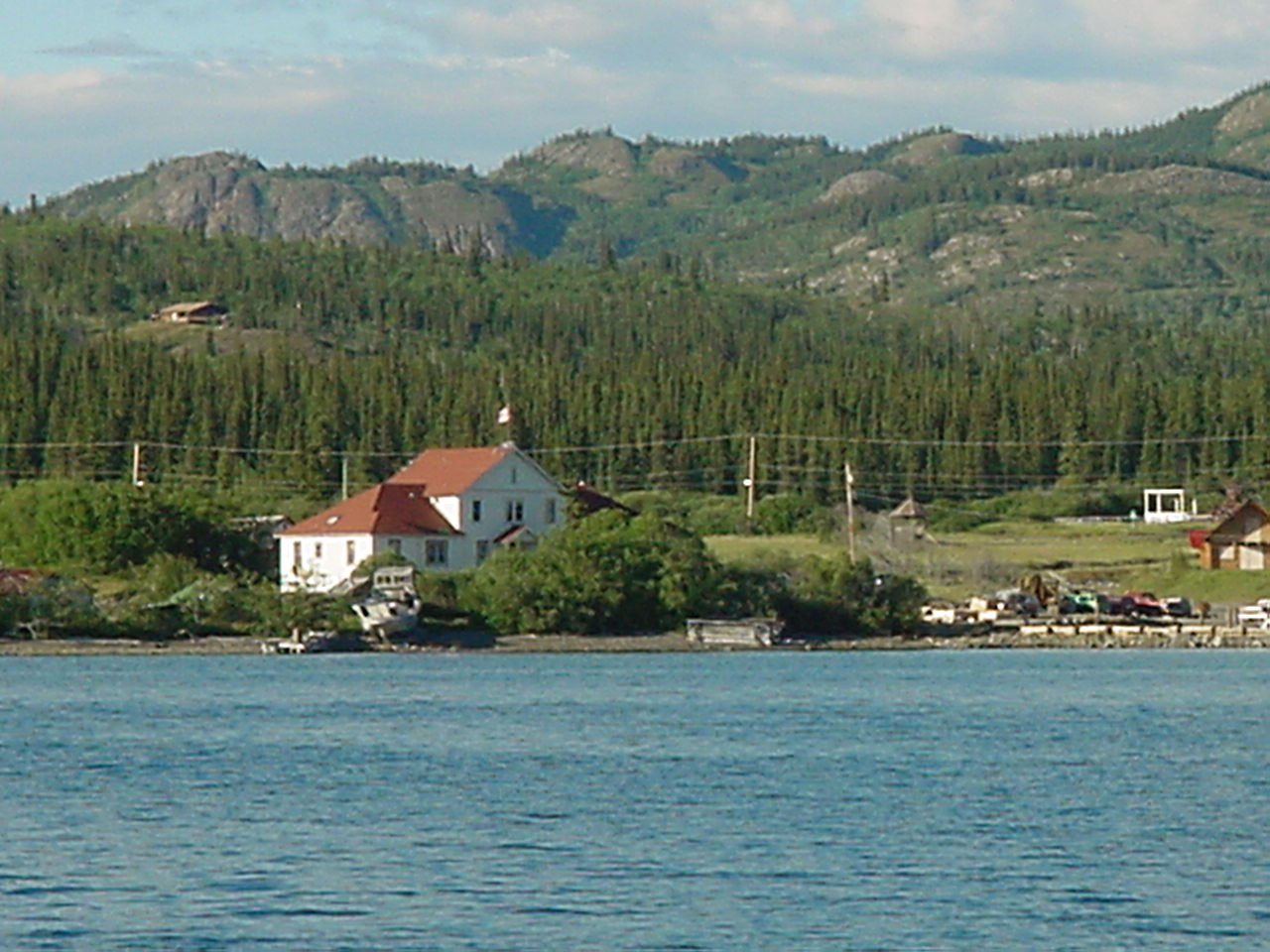
Camp-30 (Atlin, British Columbia)

== See also ==
- Llewellyn Glacier
- Glaciology
- Glacier Mass Balance
