= Annex Peak =

Mountain in Alaska, United States

- Location within Alaska

Highest point
- Elevation: 4,094 ft (1,248 m)
- Listing: Mountains of the United States
- Coordinates: 58°21′41″N 134°08′13″W

Geography
- Location: Juneau, Alaska, U.S.
- Parent range: Boundary Ranges
- Topo map: USGS Juneau B-1

Annex Peak is a mountain in the city and borough of Juneau, Alaska, United States. It is a part of the Boundary Ranges of the Coast Mountains in western North America. It is 3 miles (4.8 km) west of Scow Cove and 11 miles (18 km) northeast of the city of Juneau.

The mountain's name was published locally by D. A. Brew and A. B. Ford of the United States Geological Survey (USGS) in 1965; it was collected by the USGS between 1976 and 1981, and entered into the Survey's Geographic Names Information System on March 31, 1981.

== See also ==
- Mount Roberts
