= Herbert Glacier =

Glacier in Alaska, United States

Coordinates: 58.554°N 134.623°W

Herbert Glacier is located in the Tongass National Forest near Juneau, Alaska in the United States. A six-mile trail, reachable from Glacier Highway, provides walking and bike access closer to the glacier via a former horse trail, and provides information on plant life following glacial recession. As the glacier has receded, mining claims on the Herbert River have increased.

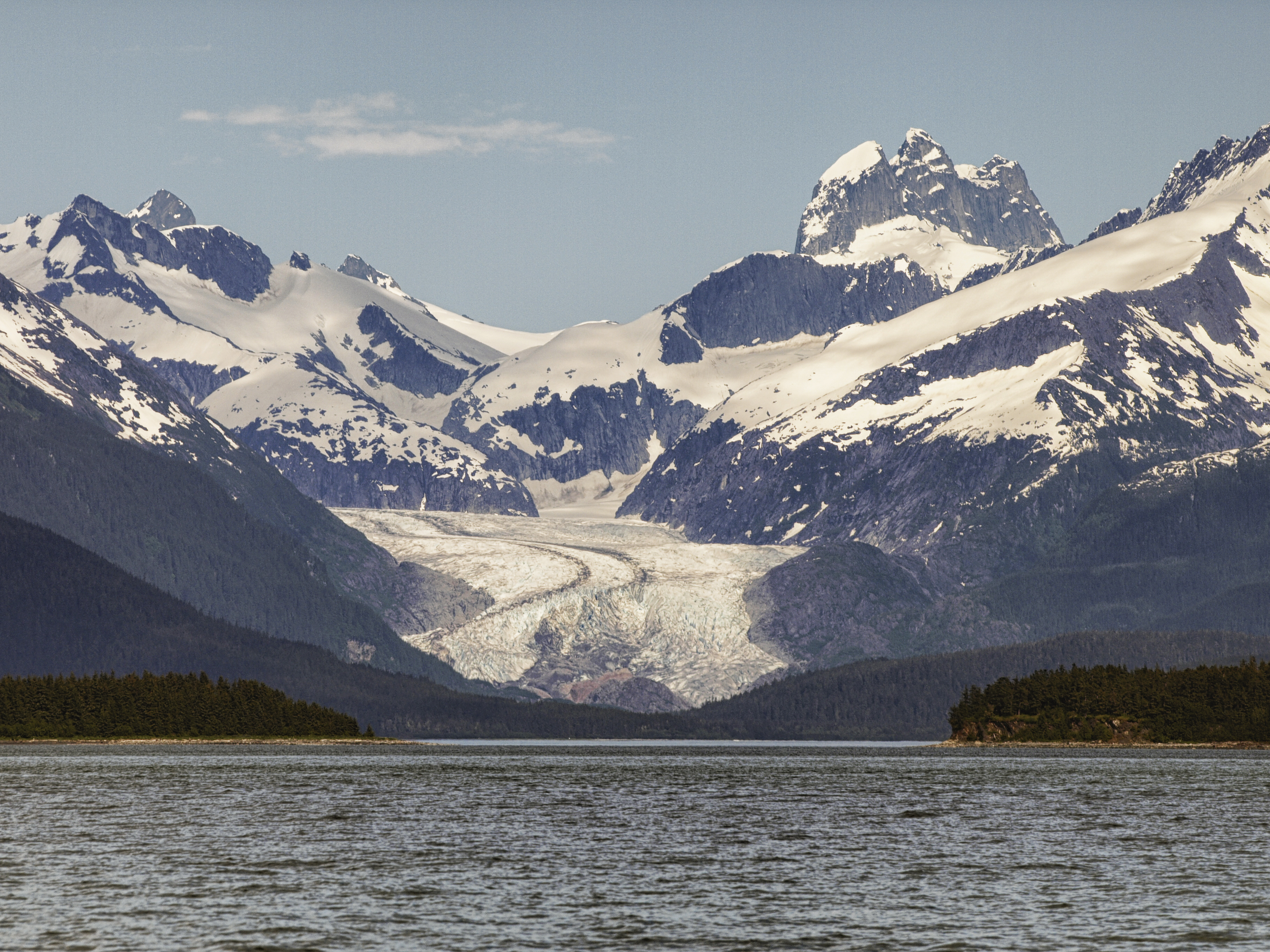
Herbert Glacier
