= Juneau Icefield =

Icefield in Alaska, US, and British Columbia, Canada

Coordinates: 58°36′N 134°30′W

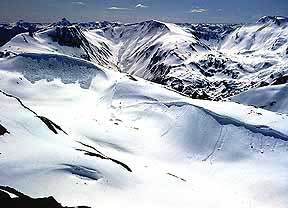
View of the Juneau Icefield.

The Juneau Icefield is an ice field located just north of Juneau, Alaska, continuing north through the border with British Columbia, extending through an area of 3,900 square kilometres (1,500 mi^{2}) in the Coast Range ranging 140 km (87 mi) north to south and 75 km (47 mi) east to west. The icefield is the source of many glaciers, including the Mendenhall Glacier and the Taku Glacier. The icefield is home to over 40 large valley glaciers and 100 smaller ones. The Icefield serves as a tourist attraction with many travellers flown in by helicopter for quick walks on the 240-to-1,400-metre (790 to 4,590 ft) deep ice and the massive, awe-inspiring moist crevasses.

== Glaciers ==
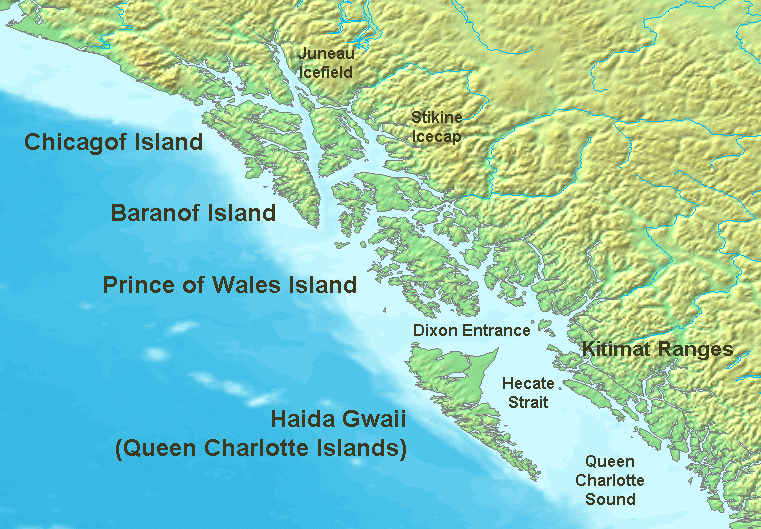
Locational map of major features of the Alaska Panhandle area including the Juneau Icefield in the northern portion.

Eight kilometers to the north, the Herbert Glacier has retreated 540 m (0.34 mi), while Eagle Glacier retreated 700 m (0.43 mi), Gilkey Glacier 3,500 m (2.2 mi) and Llewellyn Glacier 2,800 m (1.7 mi). On the south side of the icefield, the Norris Glacier retreated 1,740 m (1.08 mi), the East Twin Glacier 1,100 m (0.68 mi), the West Twin Glacier 570 m (0.35 mi) with only the Taku Glacier advancing. Surveys reveal the Taku as one of the deepest glaciers of the sub-temperate icefields surveyed at nearly 1,370 metres (4,490 ft) thick.

== History ==
In 1890, John Muir viewed Taku Glacier from a steamer in Taku Inlet and described an iceberg-calving front about three-quarters of a mile wide. The first United States Coast and Geodetic Survey chart of the inlet, also made in 1890, shows the glacier ending at the head of a deep tidal basin. Between 1890 and 1948, the glacier advanced 5.3 km (3.3 mi), and sediment gradually filled the once-deep tidal basin in front of it. Calving had largely ceased by about 1950, after the glacier's sediment moraine rose above the water surface.

From 1948–1986, the glacier had a positive glacier mass balance driving the advance. From 1987–2009, the glacier has had a slightly negative mass balance, not enough to end the advance, but if it continues will soon slow it.

The icefield, like many of its glaciers, reached its maximum glaciation point around 1700 and has been in retreat since. Much of the icefield is contained within the Tongass National Forest. Since 1948, the Juneau Icefield Research Program has monitored glaciers of the Juneau Icefield. On the west side of the icefield, from 1946 to 2009, the terminus of the Mendenhall Glacier has retreated over 700 metres (0.43 mi).

== Peaks ==
Notable peaks on the Juneau Icefield are Devils Paw, Nelles Peak, Emperor Peak, The Snow Towers, Taku Towers, Camp 15 Peak, and the Mendenhall Towers.

== Gallery ==
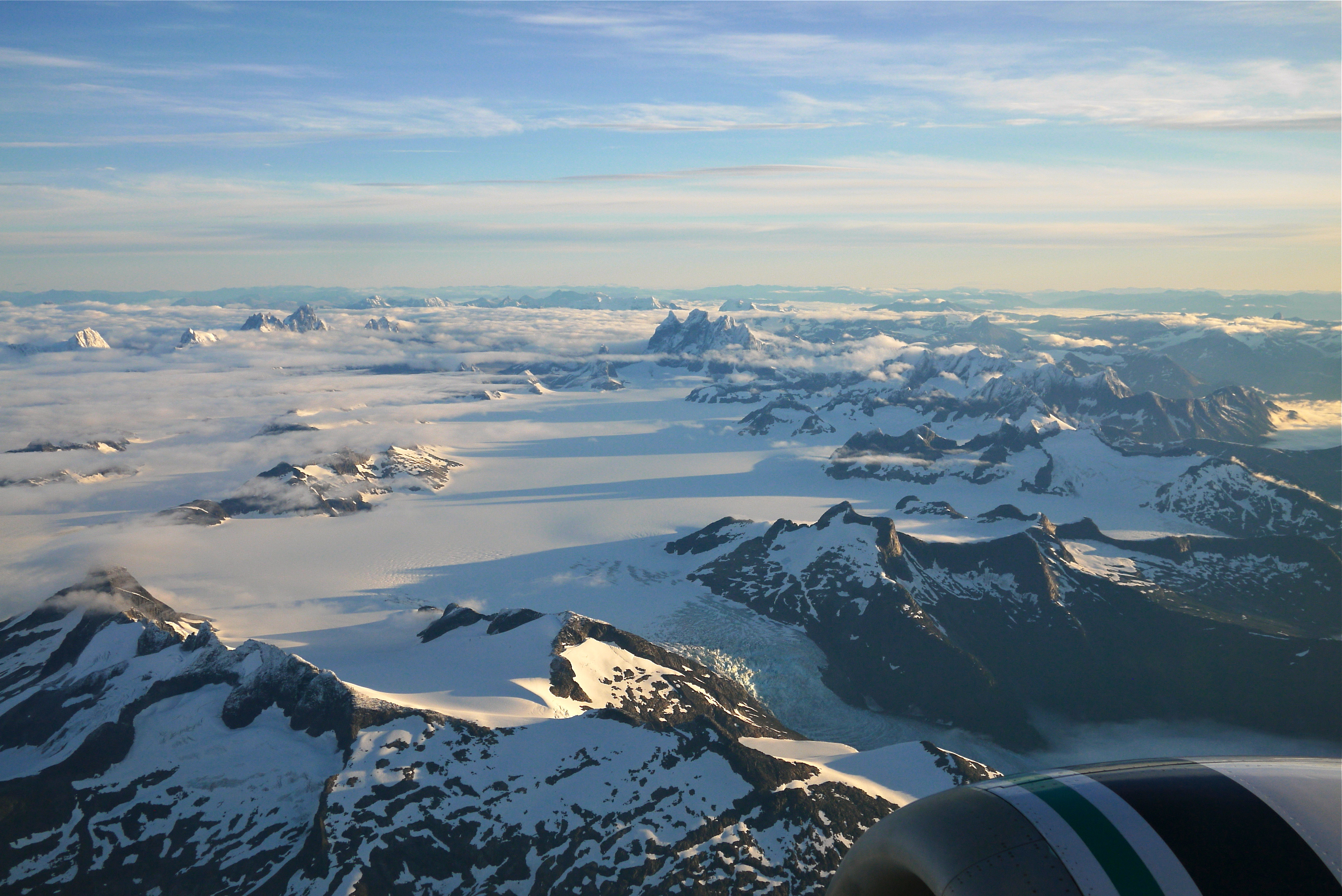
Juneau Icefield showing Devils Paw and Nelles Peak

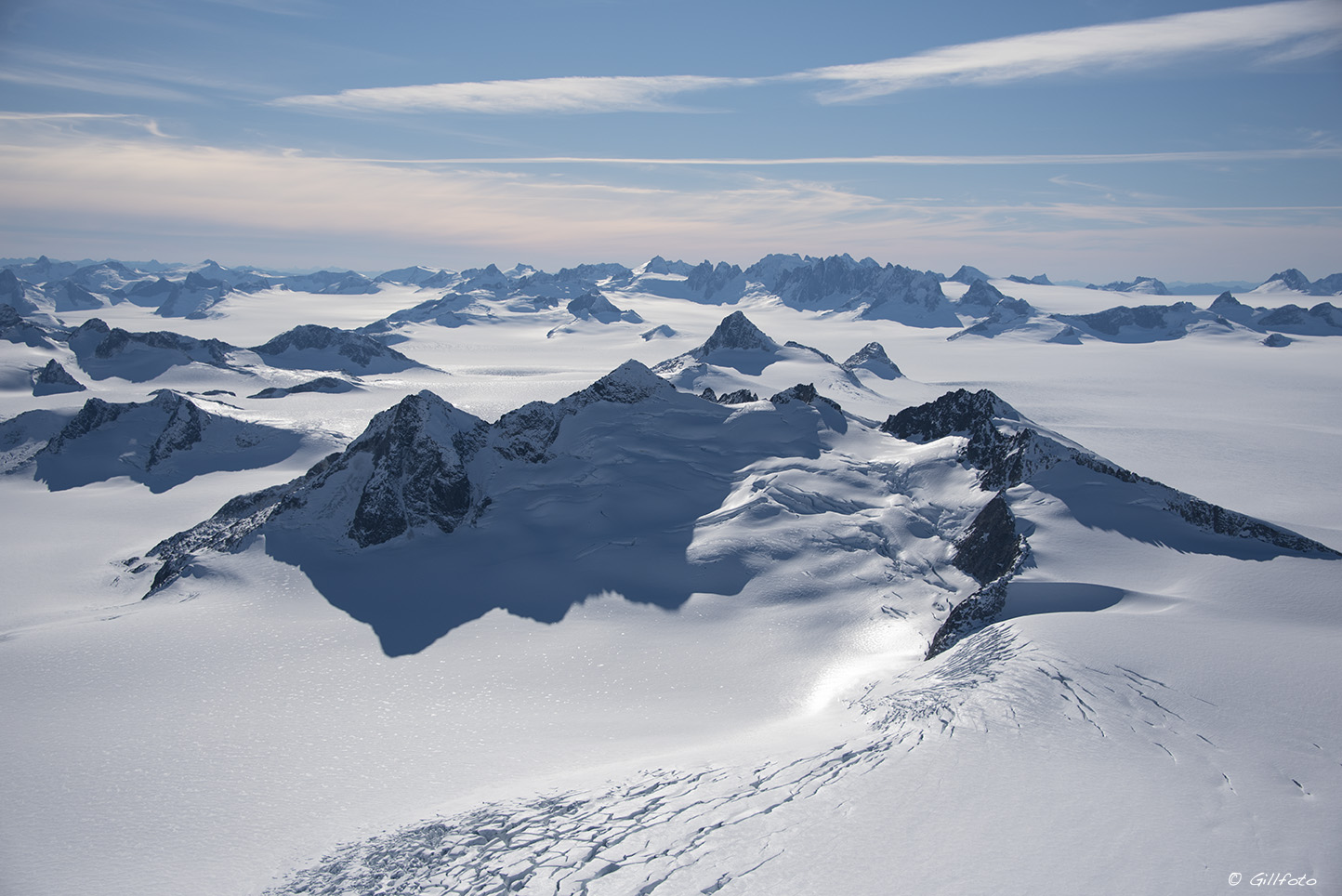
Spirit Range, over the Juneau Icefield

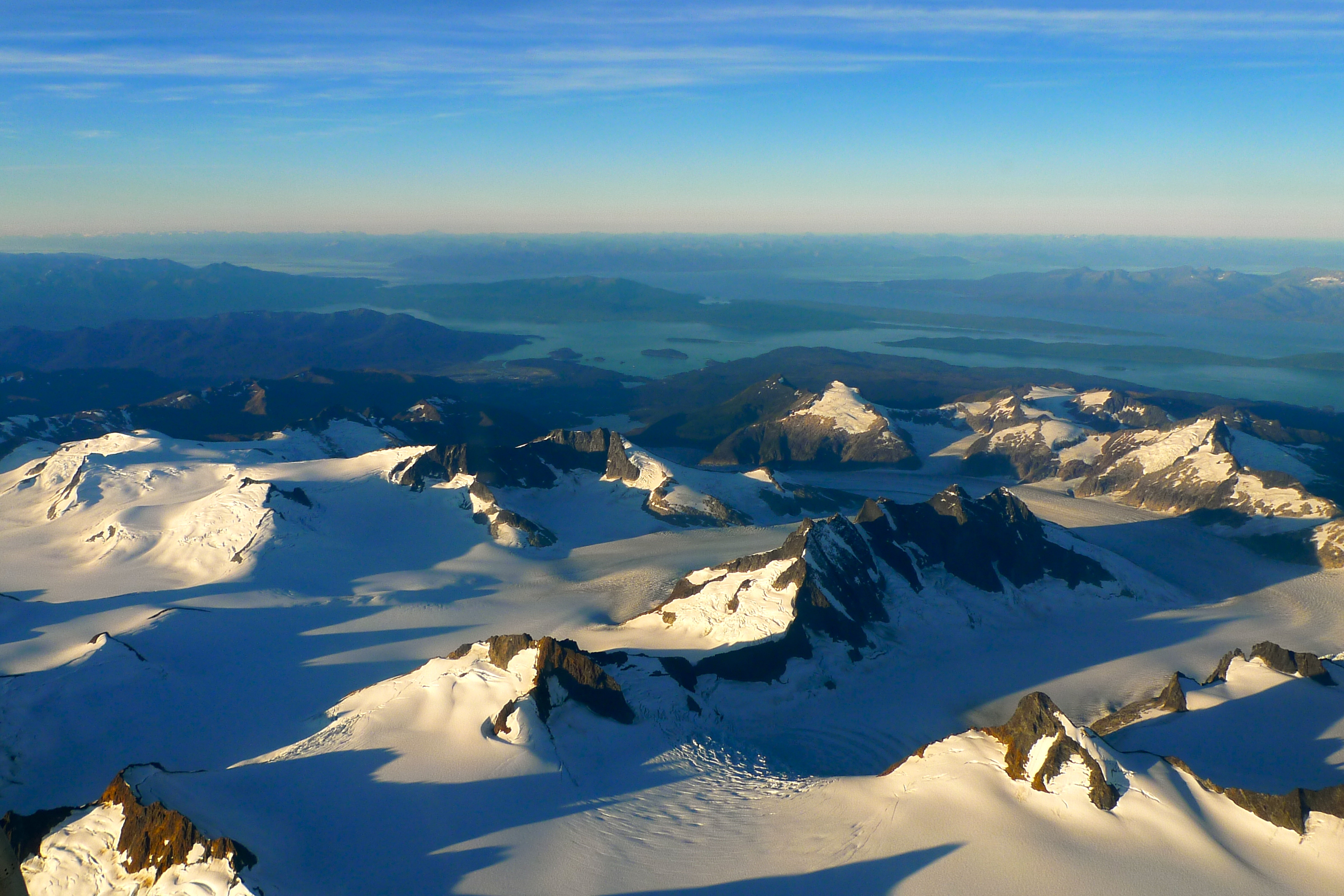
Several prominent peaks in the icefield

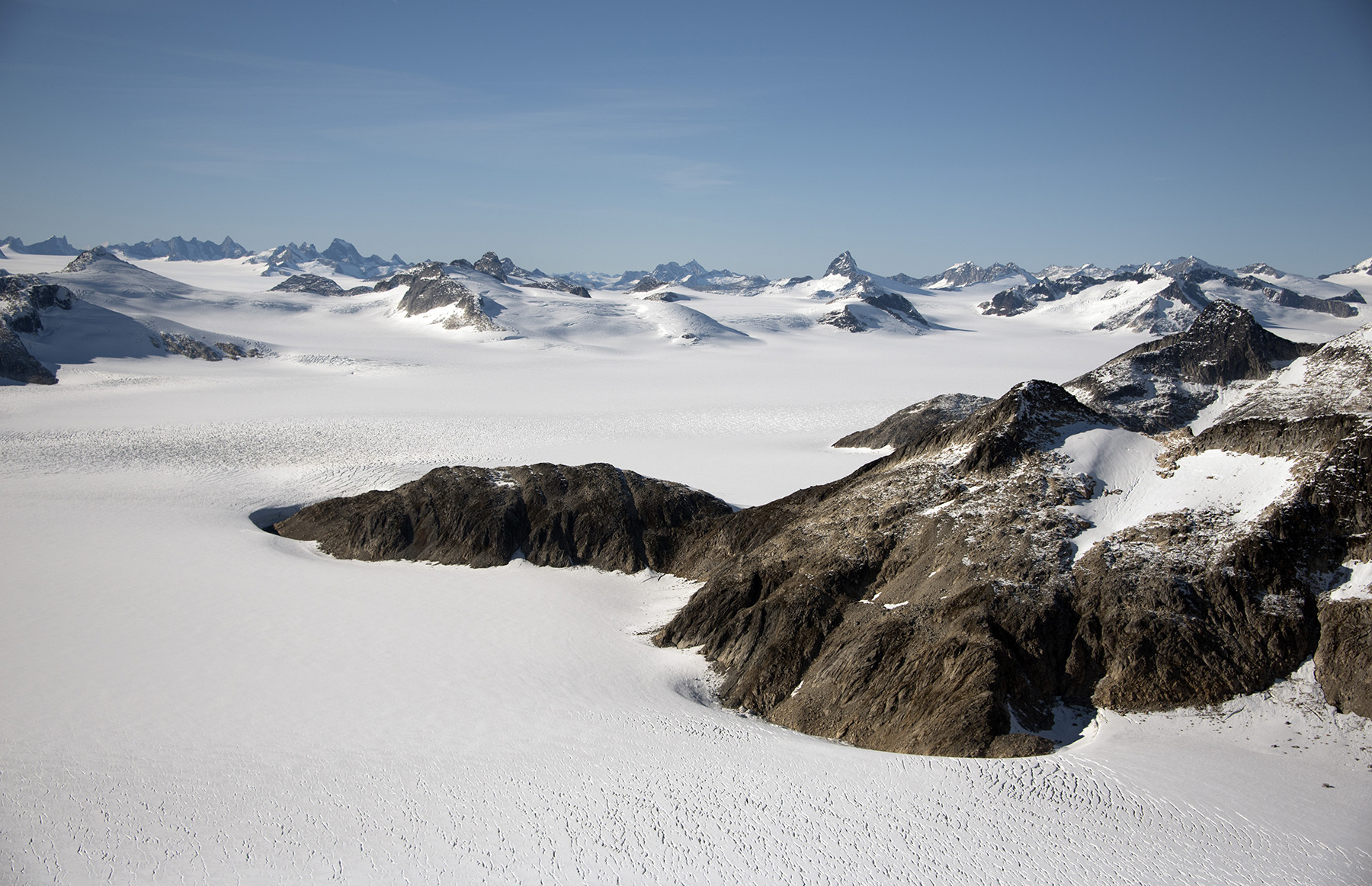
Juneau Icefield looking Northwest

== See also ==
- List of glaciers and icefields
- Retreat of glaciers since 1850
- Ha-Iltzuk Icefield
- Homathko Icefield
- Lillooet Icecap
