= Taku Inlet =

Coordinates: 58°20′26″N 134°1′51″W

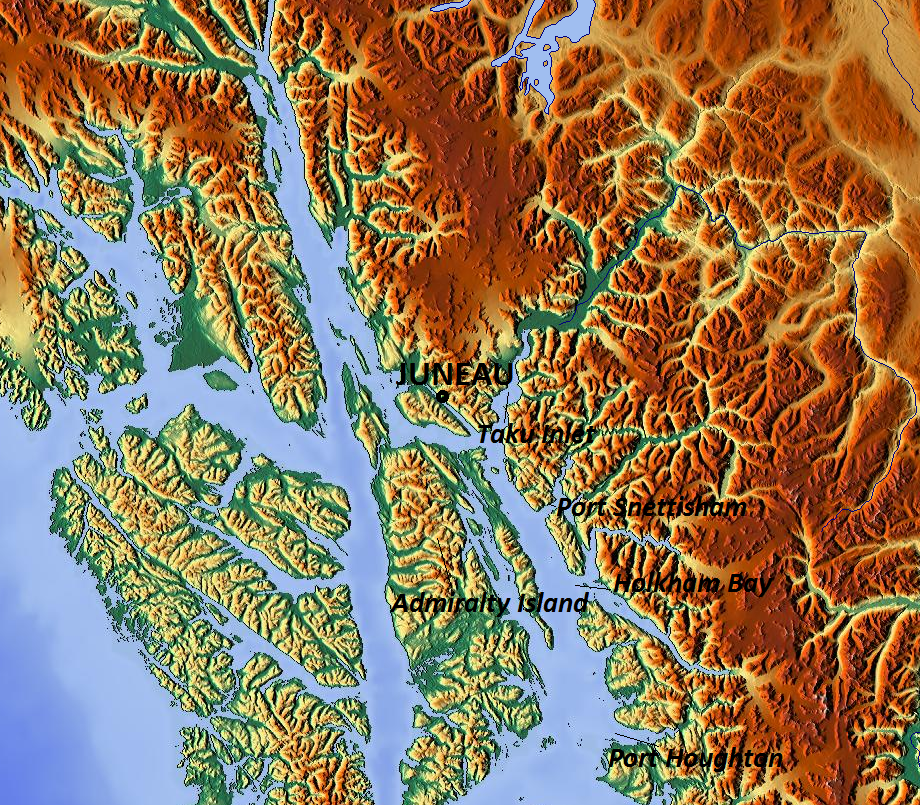
Location of Taku Inlet

Taku Inlet is an inlet located in the U.S. state of Alaska. It extends 18 miles (29 km) in a northeast direction from Stephens Passage in the Alexander Archipelago, about 12 kilometres (7.5 mi) southeast of Juneau, widening to a basin where discharge from the Taku River and Taku Glacier emerges.

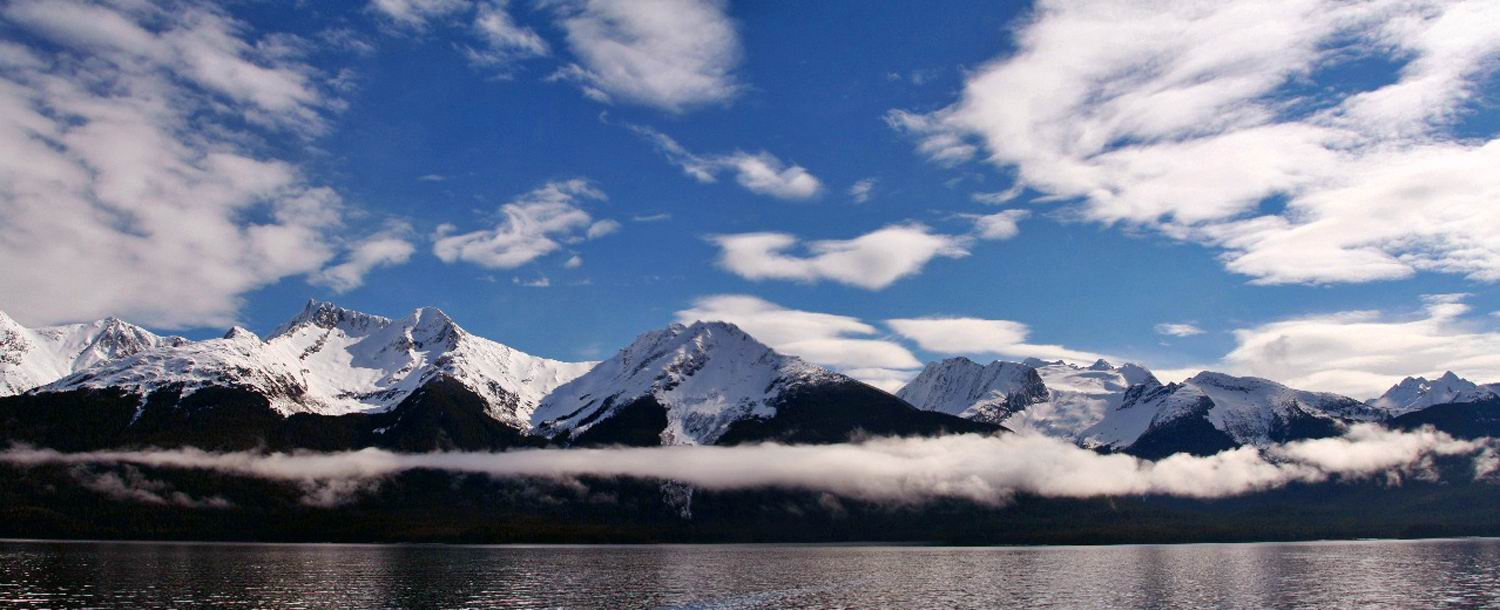
The waters and shore of Taku Inlet

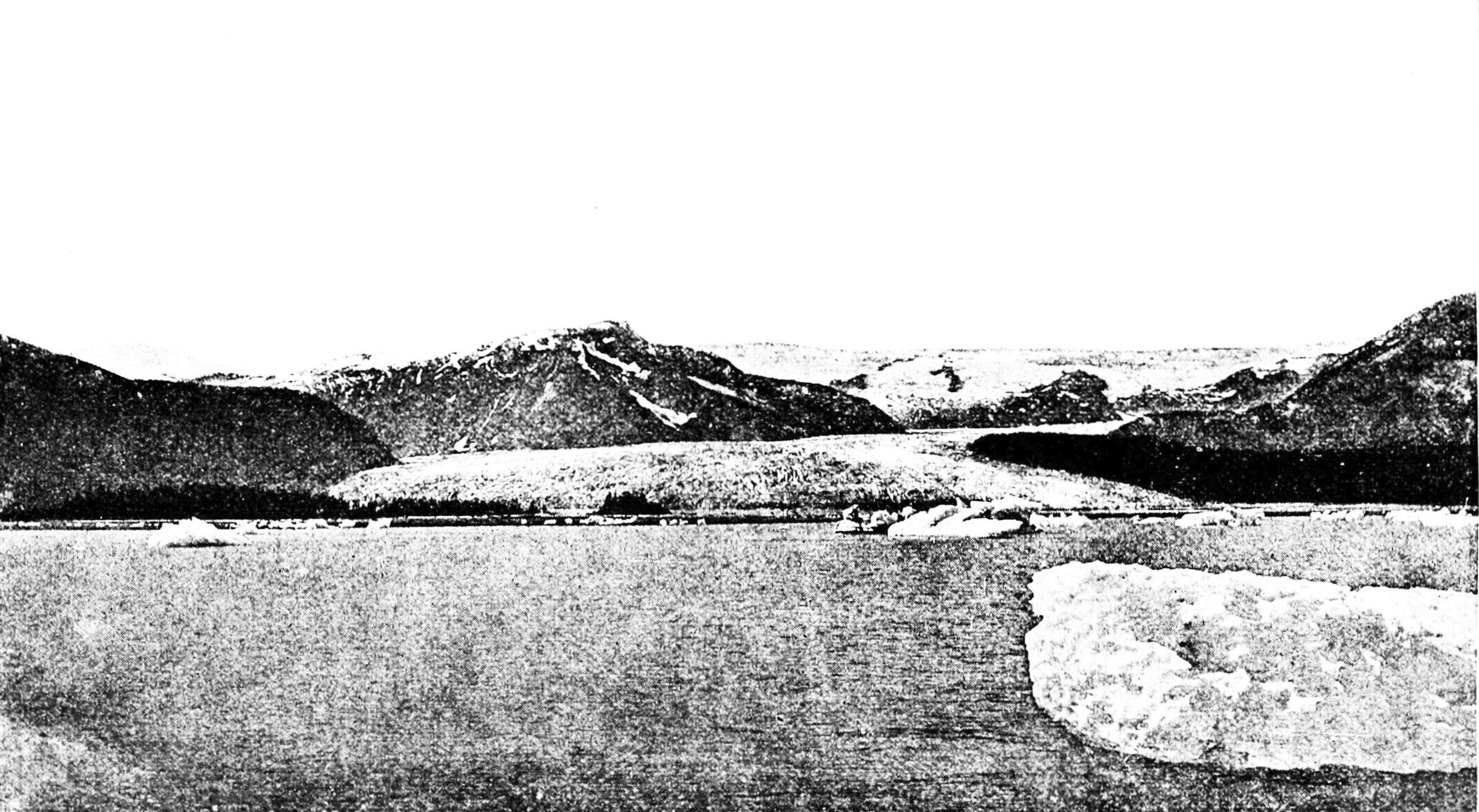
The Norris Glacier as it empties into Taku Inlet, 1889.

== Geography ==
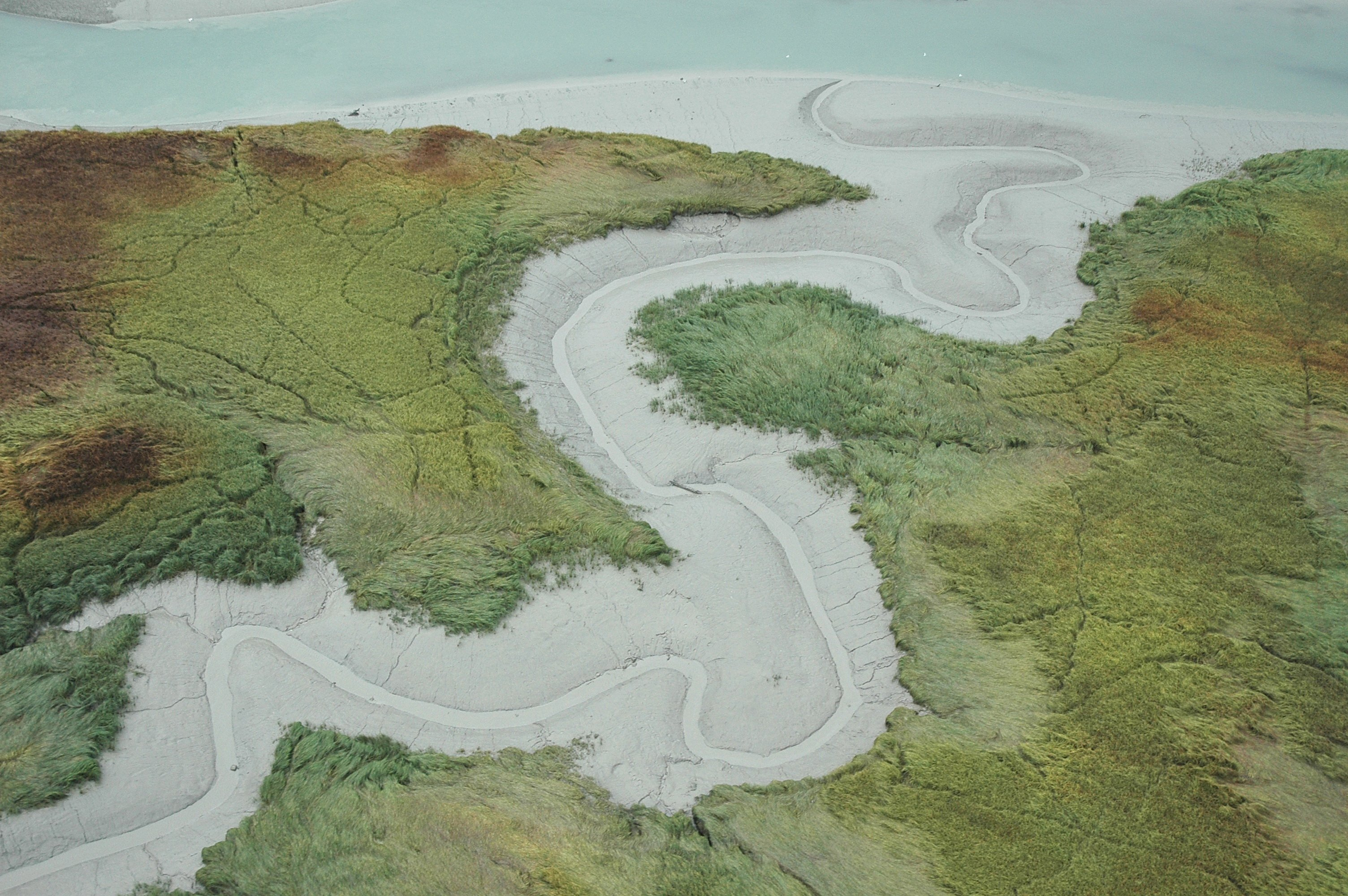
A meandering, gray mud tidal stream empties into Taku Inlet

Taku Inlet is suitable for use only for shallow draft river boats, as it is shallow in depth and is a “cul-de-sac”. Taku Glacier is located at the head of this inlet. Since 1890, the glacier had moved by some 3 miles (4.8 km) into the Taku Inlet. As a result of the rapid movement of the glacier, silting has occurred at the head of the inlet. However, a clear channel exists between Taku Point and the Norris Glacier moraine, 1.25 miles (2.01 km) wide, with a depth of above 10 fathoms. A complete preliminary navigational chart, to a scale of 1:10,000, has been prepared by field surveys, to facilitate interested navigators to operate ships to view the glaciers. Scow Cove, Sunny Cove, Annex Peak, and Annex Lakes are some of its geographical features on its western side. On the eastern side of the inlet is Turner Lake, Bart Lake and Lake Dorothy.

Norris, Taku, Hole-in–the-Wall, Twin and Tulsequah glaciers emerge out on the southeastern side and flow into the trench of the Taku Inlet and Taku River. Two ice-streams join here to form a fan slope, ending in a terminal moraine. The sandy level of the moraine is cut by several watercourses; crimson epilobium blanket the beds of moraine.

=== Climate ===
Annex Creek is a weather station on the western shore of Taku Inlet, below Annex Lakes.

Climate data for Annex Creek, Alaska, 1991-2020 normals, 1917-2023 extremes: 92ft (28m)
Month	Jan	Feb	Mar	Apr	May	Jun	Jul	Aug	Sep	Oct	Nov	Dec	Year
Record high °F (°C)	55 (13)	58 (14)	58 (14)	73 (23)	76 (24)	84 (29)	83 (28)	82 (28)	74 (23)	64 (18)	60 (16)	54 (12)	84 (29)
Mean maximum °F (°C)	43.1 (6.2)	43.2 (6.2)	46.5 (8.1)	58.2 (14.6)	67.0 (19.4)	70.1 (21.2)	70.2 (21.2)	71.1 (21.7)	64.0 (17.8)	55.3 (12.9)	46.1 (7.8)	43.0 (6.1)	74.5 (23.6)
Mean daily maximum °F (°C)	28.8 (−1.8)	32.3 (0.2)	36.9 (2.7)	46.0 (7.8)	54.4 (12.4)	59.2 (15.1)	58.9 (14.9)	58.7 (14.8)	53.3 (11.8)	45.2 (7.3)	35.1 (1.7)	29.3 (−1.5)	44.8 (7.1)
Daily mean °F (°C)	24.2 (−4.3)	27.6 (−2.4)	31.8 (−0.1)	39.5 (4.2)	46.8 (8.2)	52.0 (11.1)	52.6 (11.4)	52.0 (11.1)	48.1 (8.9)	40.9 (4.9)	31.4 (−0.3)	25.6 (−3.6)	39.4 (4.1)
Mean daily minimum °F (°C)	19.5 (−6.9)	22.9 (−5.1)	26.7 (−2.9)	32.9 (0.5)	39.2 (4.0)	44.8 (7.1)	46.3 (7.9)	45.4 (7.4)	42.8 (6.0)	36.6 (2.6)	27.7 (−2.4)	21.9 (−5.6)	33.9 (1.1)
Mean minimum °F (°C)	3.8 (−15.7)	7.8 (−13.4)	14.7 (−9.6)	24.9 (−3.9)	33.2 (0.7)	39.6 (4.2)	42.3 (5.7)	41.2 (5.1)	36.1 (2.3)	28.7 (−1.8)	15.4 (−9.2)	7.6 (−13.6)	−0.3 (−17.9)
Record low °F (°C)	−14 (−26)	−18 (−28)	−5 (−21)	12 (−11)	25 (−4)	28 (−2)	29 (−2)	28 (−2)	23 (−5)	9 (−13)	−10 (−23)	−16 (−27)	−18 (−28)
Average precipitation inches (mm)	11.80 (300)	8.00 (203)	7.48 (190)	4.54 (115)	5.43 (138)	4.47 (114)	5.93 (151)	9.89 (251)	18.09 (459)	18.48 (469)	12.25 (311)	10.51 (267)	116.87 (2,968)
Average snowfall inches (cm)	60.8 (154)	42.0 (107)	33.8 (86)	4.2 (11)	0.0 (0.0)	0.0 (0.0)	0.0 (0.0)	0.0 (0.0)	0.0 (0.0)	3.9 (9.9)	34.4 (87)	49.5 (126)	228.6 (580.9)
Source 1: NOAA(1981-2010 precipitation)
Source 2: XMACIS2 (records, 2003-2023 monthly max/mins & snowfall)

== Fauna ==
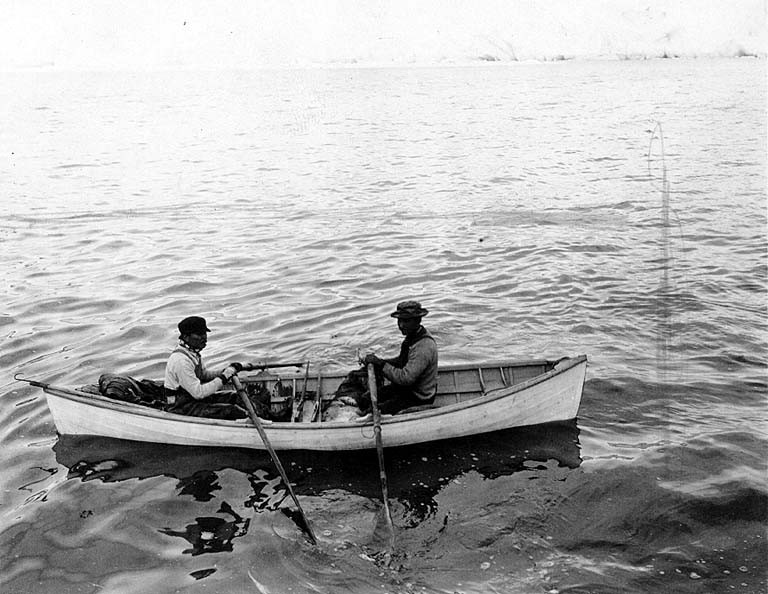
Tlingit hair seal hunters at Taku Inlet, May 1911

Many bears, wolves, and killer whales are found in the area. Halibut and crabs are commercially harvested in Taku Inlet.
