= Taku Glacier =

Glacier in Alaska, United States

- T'aaḵú Ḵwáan Sít'i
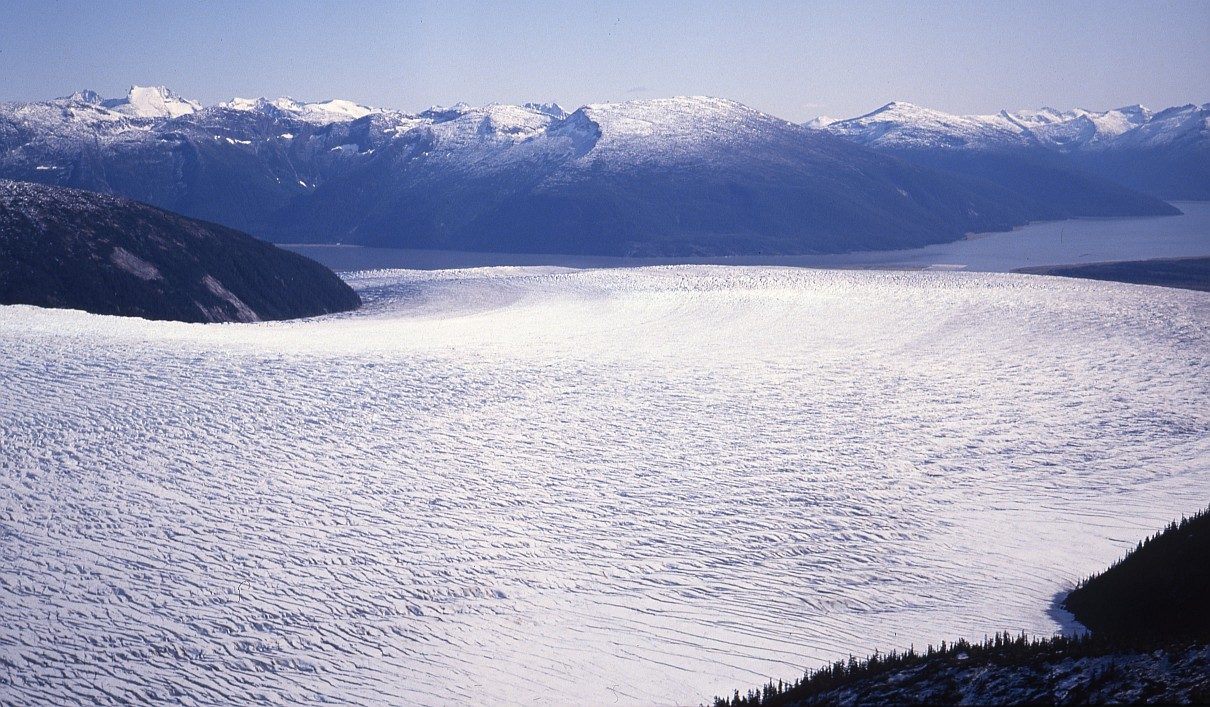
- Taku Glacier in 1992

- Location within Alaska
- Interactive map of Taku Glacier
- Type: Tidewater glacier
- Location: City and Borough of Juneau, Alaska, United States
- Coordinates: 58°35′42″N 134°10′47″W
- Area: 386 sq mi (1,000 km^{2})
- Length: 58 km (36 mi)
- Terminus: Taku River
- Status: Retreating

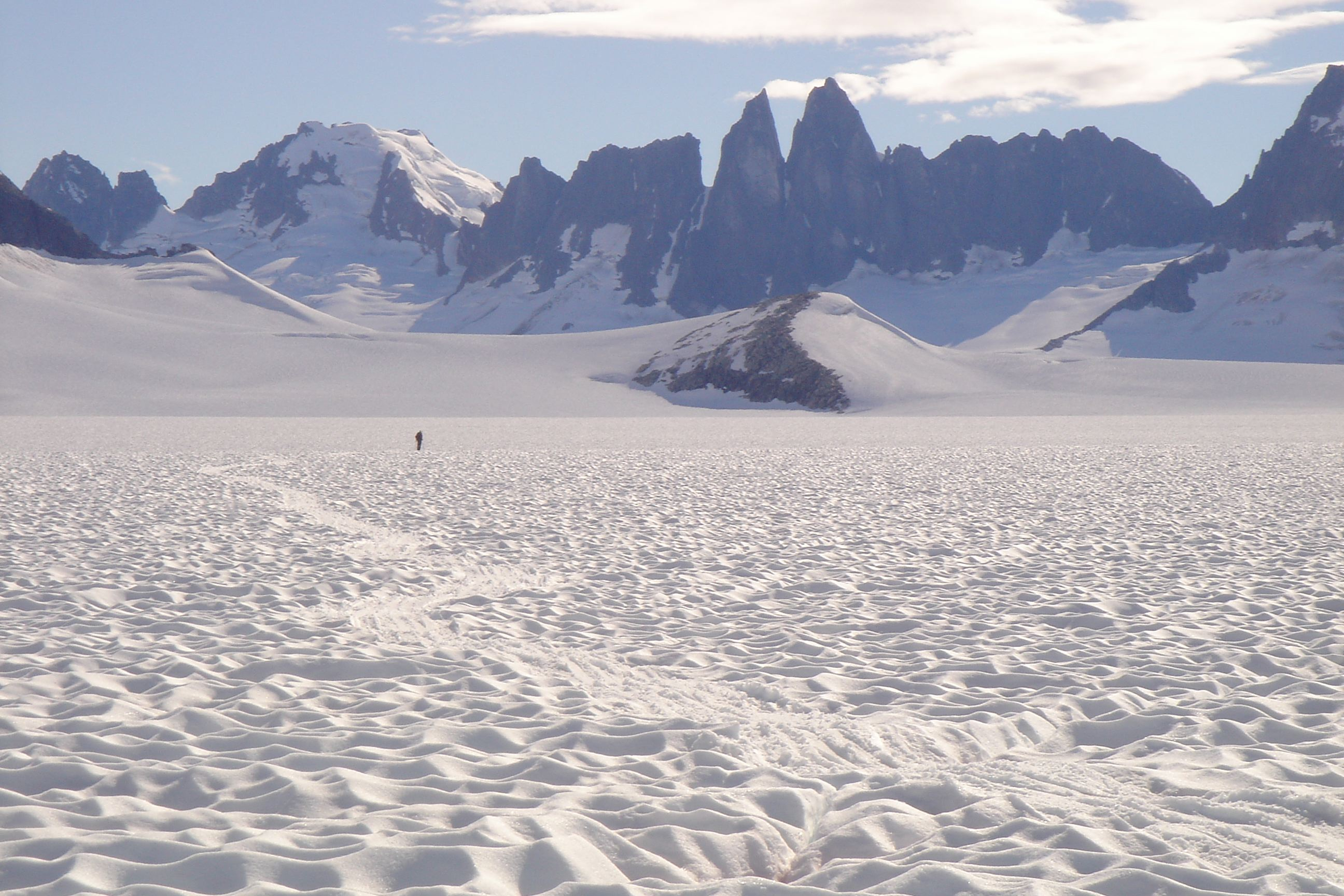
View across the Taku Glacier to Taku Towers.

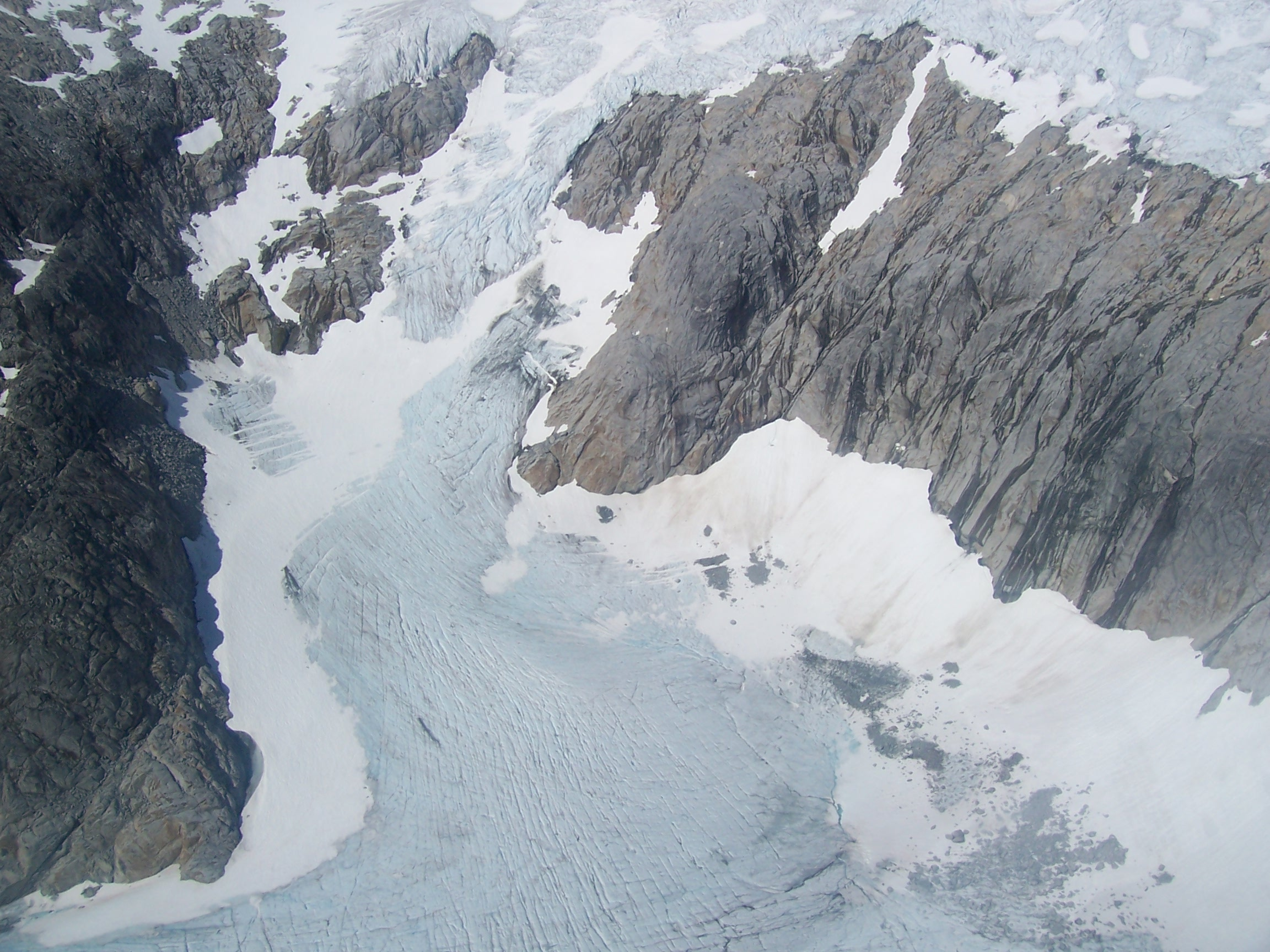
An aerial view of a small corner of Taku Glacier, 2007.

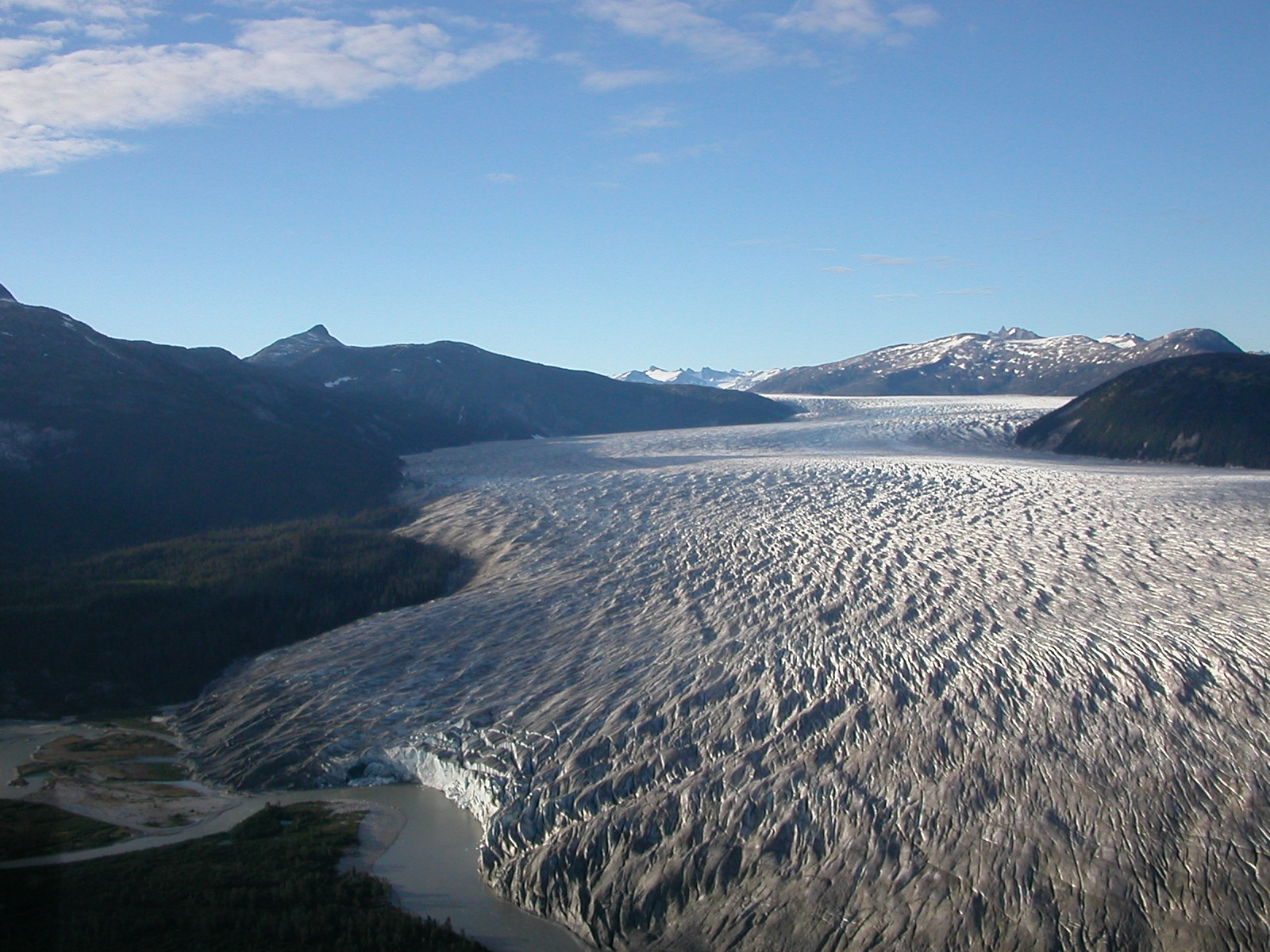
Taku Glacier at the glacial snout

Aerial view of curving crevasse bands on the Taku Glacier, June 2026

Taku Glacier (Lingít: T'aaḵú Ḵwáan Sít'i) is a tidewater glacier located in Taku Inlet in the U.S. state of Alaska, just southeast of the city of Juneau. Recognized as the deepest and thickest alpine temperate glacier known in the world, the Taku Glacier is measured at 4,845 feet (1,477 m) thick. It is about 58 kilometres (36 mi) long, and is largely within the Tongass National Forest.

The glacier has been named Schultze Glacier in 1883 and the Foster Glacier in 1890, but Taku, the name the local Tlingit natives had for the glacier, eventually stuck. It is nestled in the Coast Mountains and originates in the Juneau Icefield. It is the largest glacier in the icefield and one of the southernmost tidewater glaciers of the northern hemisphere.

The glacier, which converges with the Taku River at Taku Inlet, has a history of advancing until it blocks the river, creating a lake, followed by a dramatic break of the ice dam. The most recent of these advances occurred in 1750. The glacier has advanced 7.75 kilometres (4.82 mi) since 1890, and as of June 29, 2012 is 1.26 kilometres (0.78 mi) from Taku Point. It is the only advancing glacier of the 20 major glaciers of the Juneau Icefield. If the advance continues it will again block the river, but this appears unlikely at present. Since 1946, the glacier has been monitored by the Juneau Icefield Research Program, which has documented its rate of advance since 1988 at 17 metres (56 ft) a year. The advance is due to a positive mass balance; that is, more snow accumulates than snow and ice melt. Until 1948 the glacier had a calving front; since then the terminus has been grounded.

Due to the positive mass balance and the fact that it was no longer losing mass to icebergs, Taku Glacier has become insensitive to the warming that has impacted all other glaciers of the icefield. This has driven its advance. The recent negative mass balance 1989-2005 is not large enough yet to stop the advance, but it is the first sign that the glacier's advance may not take it to Taku Point.

Taku Glacier is the namesake of the Alaska Marine Highway System ferry M/V Taku.

Taku Glacier was reported to be in retreat as of 2019.

== See also ==
- List of glaciers in the United States
