= Mount Ernest Gruening =

Mountain in Alaska, U.S.

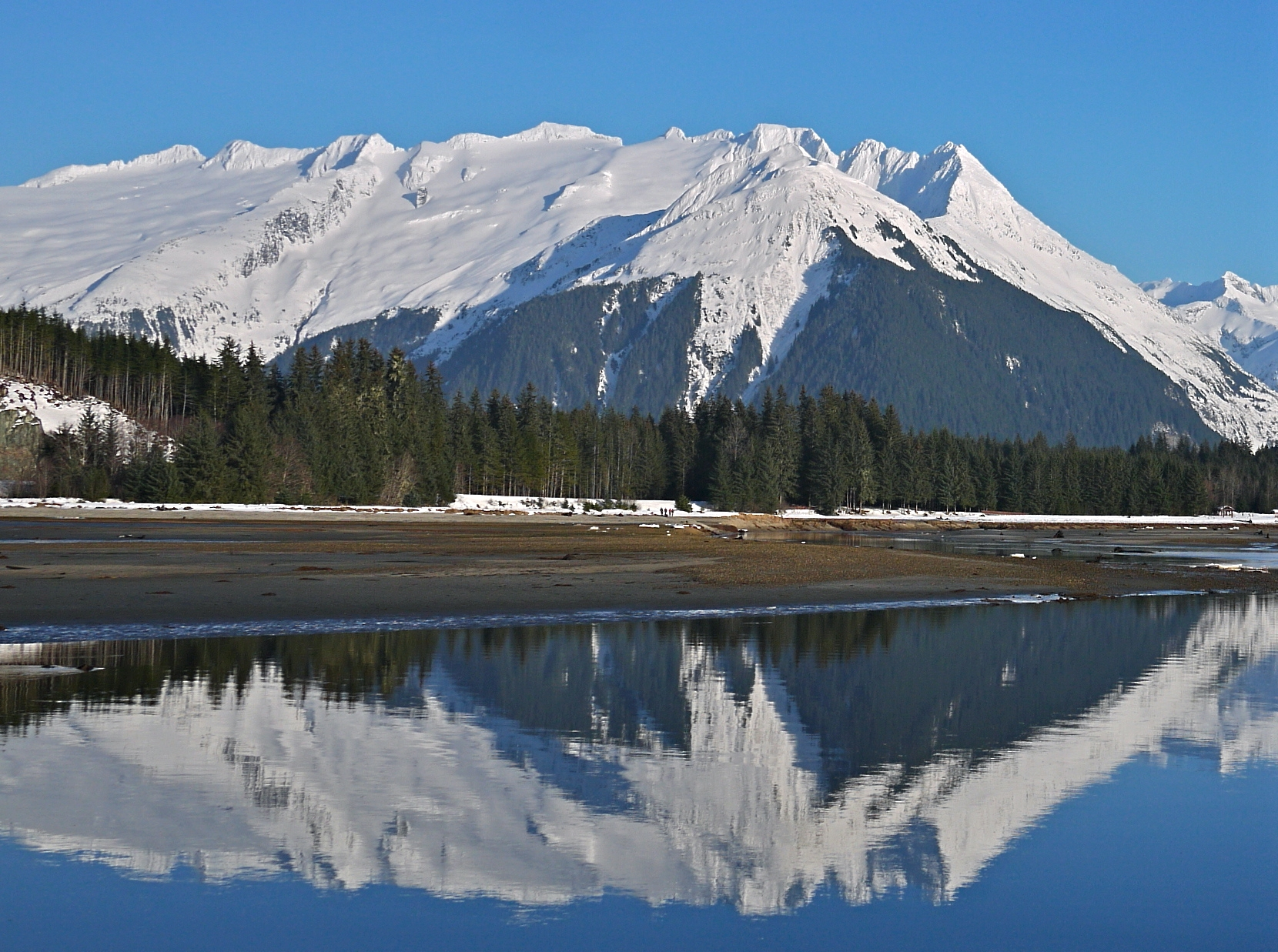
- Mount Ernest Gruening, west aspect

Highest point
- Elevation: 6,015+ ft (1,830+ m)
- Prominence: 1,615 ft (492 m)
- Parent peak: The Snow Towers
- Isolation: 4.5 mi (7.2 km)
- Coordinates: 58°34′24″N 134°39′19″W

Naming
- Etymology: Ernest Gruening

Geography
- Location within Alaska
- Interactive map of Mount Ernest Gruening
- Location: Tongass National Forest; Juneau Borough; Alaska, United States
- Parent range: Coast Mountains; Boundary Ranges; Juneau Icefield
- Topo map: USGS Juneau C-2

Mount Ernest Gruening is a 6,015+ ft (1,830+ m) glaciated mountain summit located in the Boundary Ranges of the Coast Mountains, in the U.S. state of Alaska. The long ridge-like mountain is situated between the Herbert Glacier and Eagle Glacier at the west edge of the Juneau Icefield, 20 mi (32 km) northwest of Juneau, Alaska, and 8 mi (13 km) east of Favorite Channel, on land managed by Tongass National Forest. Although modest in elevation, relief is significant since the east face of the mountain rises over 3,500 feet above the Herbert Glacier in less than one mile, and the west aspect rises 5,800 feet above the Eagle River valley in two miles.

== History ==
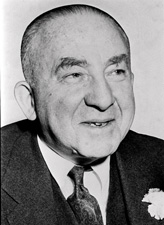
Ernest Gruening

This mountain had been called "Goat Mountain" and "Thane Mountain" until it was officially named in 1968 after Dr. Adolph Knopf, a geologist with the United States Geological Survey who studied this area.

The mountain's toponym was officially changed in 1976 by the U.S. Board on Geographic Names to honor Ernest Gruening (GREEN-ing) (1887–1974), known as "the father of Alaska statehood", the Governor of the Alaska Territory from 1939 through 1953, and one of Alaska's inaugural pair of Senators when Alaska gained statehood in 1959. The reason for the name change was Gruening had an affinity for this particular mountain within sight of his home at Eagle River Landing, and a helicopter ride to the top of this mountain was presented to him by grateful Alaskans on September 11, 1969. His cremated ashes lie scattered over the mountain as he had wished.

The Adolph Knopf name was moved to a peak eight miles to the north of its previous location. Some maps continue to misidentify Mount Ernest Gruening as Adolph Knopf Mountain.

== Climate ==
Based on the Köppen climate classification, Mount Ernest Gruening is located in a subpolar oceanic climate zone, with long, cold, wet winters, and cool summers. Weather systems coming off the Gulf of Alaska are forced upwards by the Coast Mountains (orographic lift), causing heavy precipitation in the form of rainfall and snowfall. Temperatures can drop below −20 °C with wind chill factors below −30 °C. The months May through July offer the most favorable weather for viewing this peak.

== Gallery ==
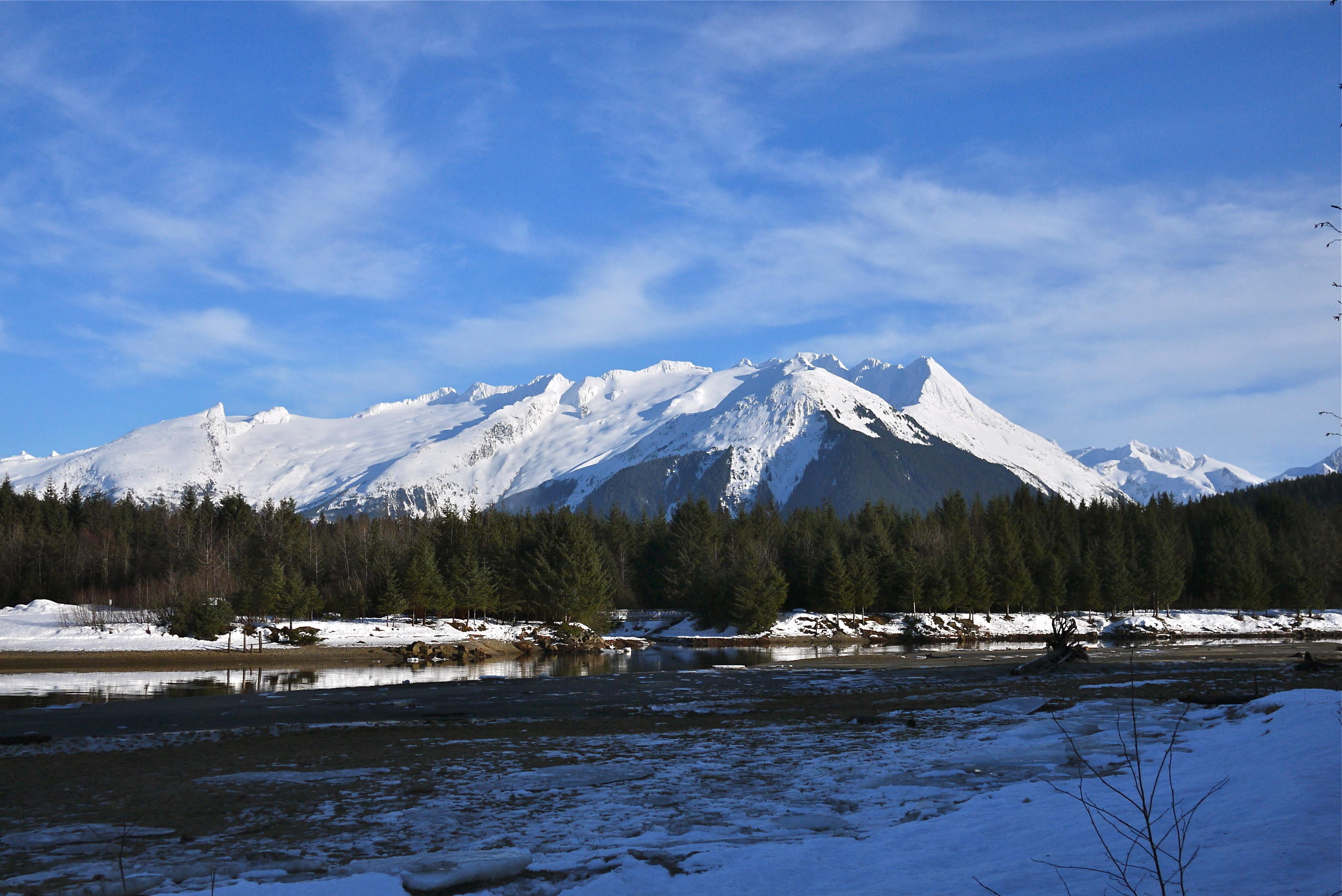
From west at Eagle River

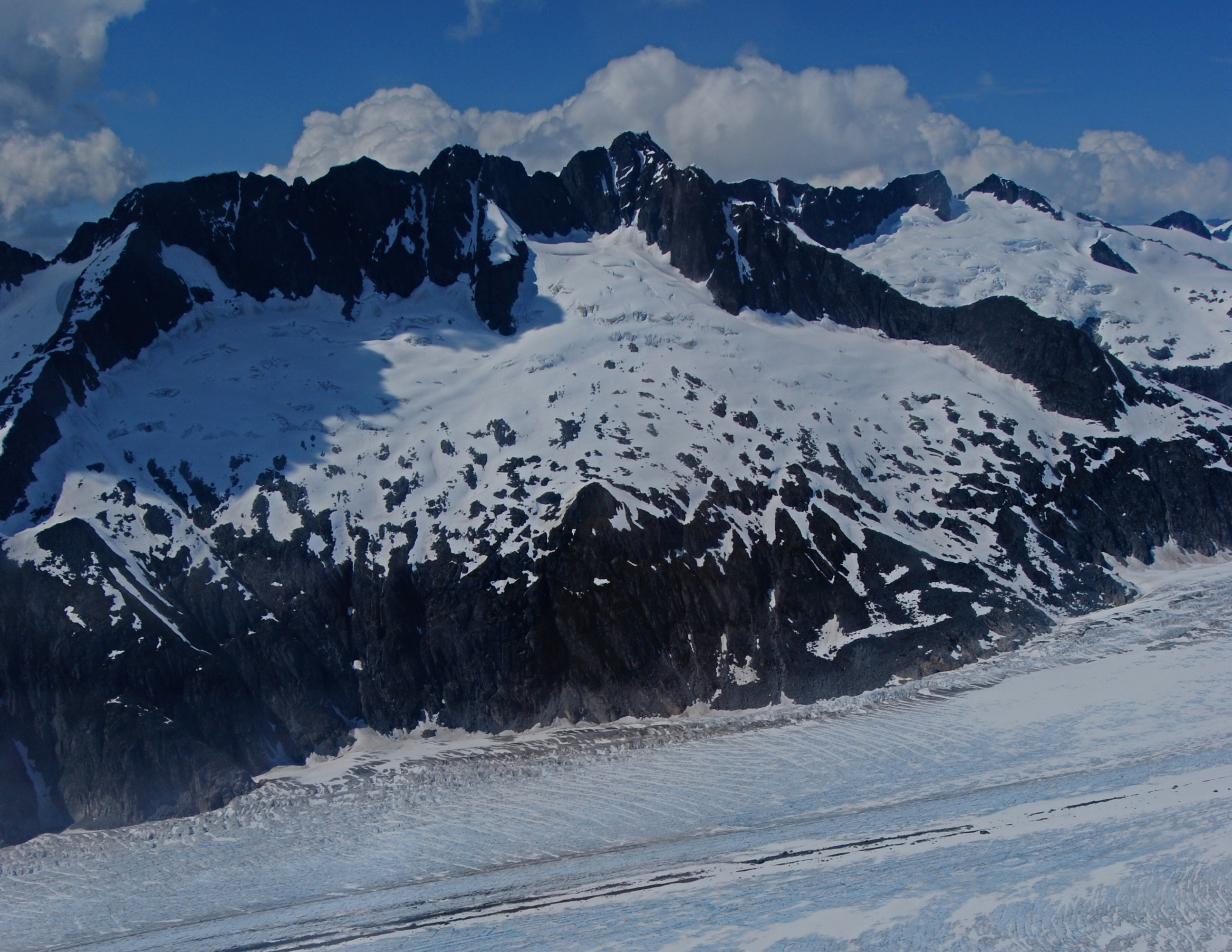
East aspect, aerial view

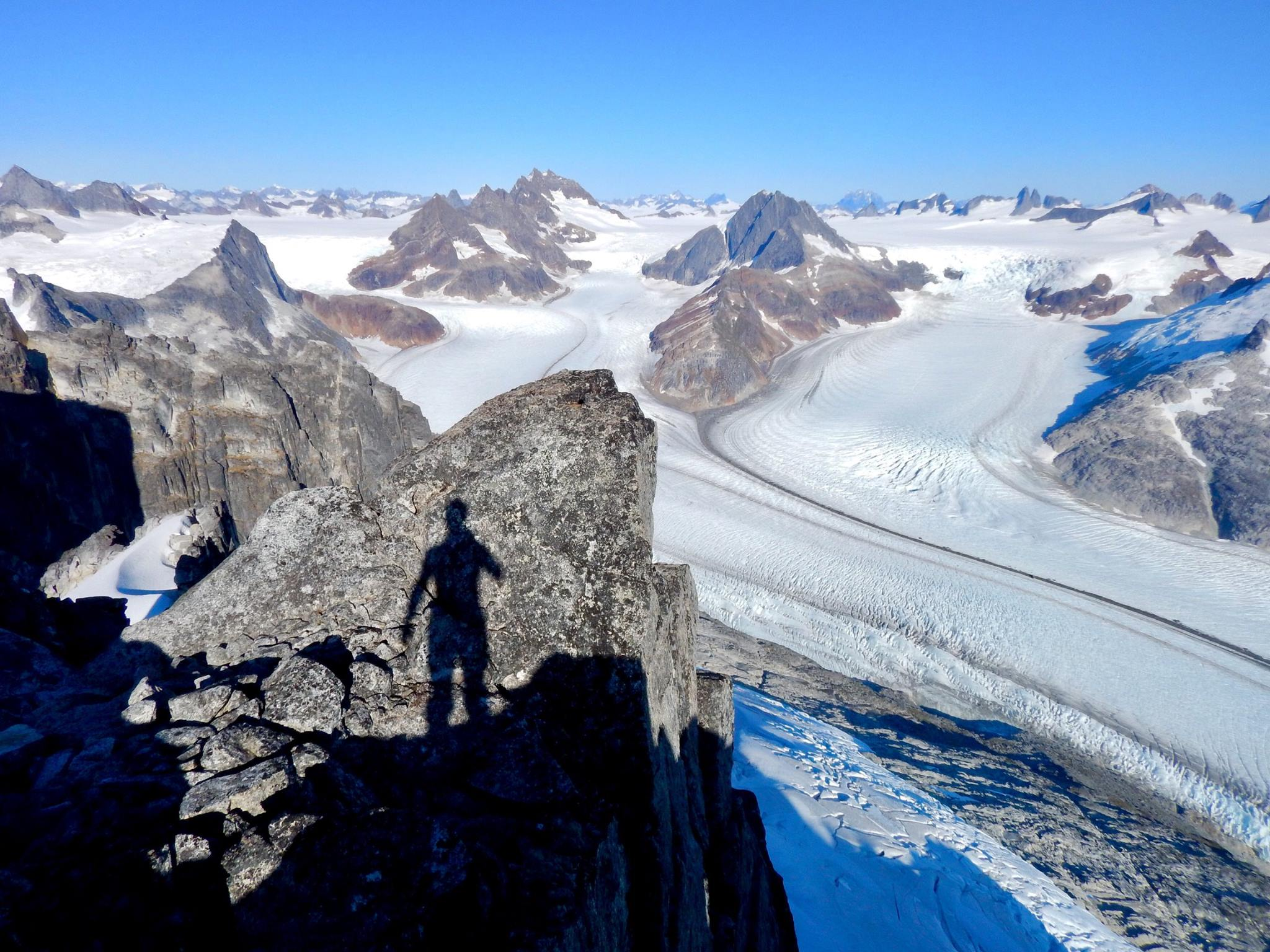
View from Mt. Ernest Gruening of Herbert Glacier and The Snow Towers (left of center)

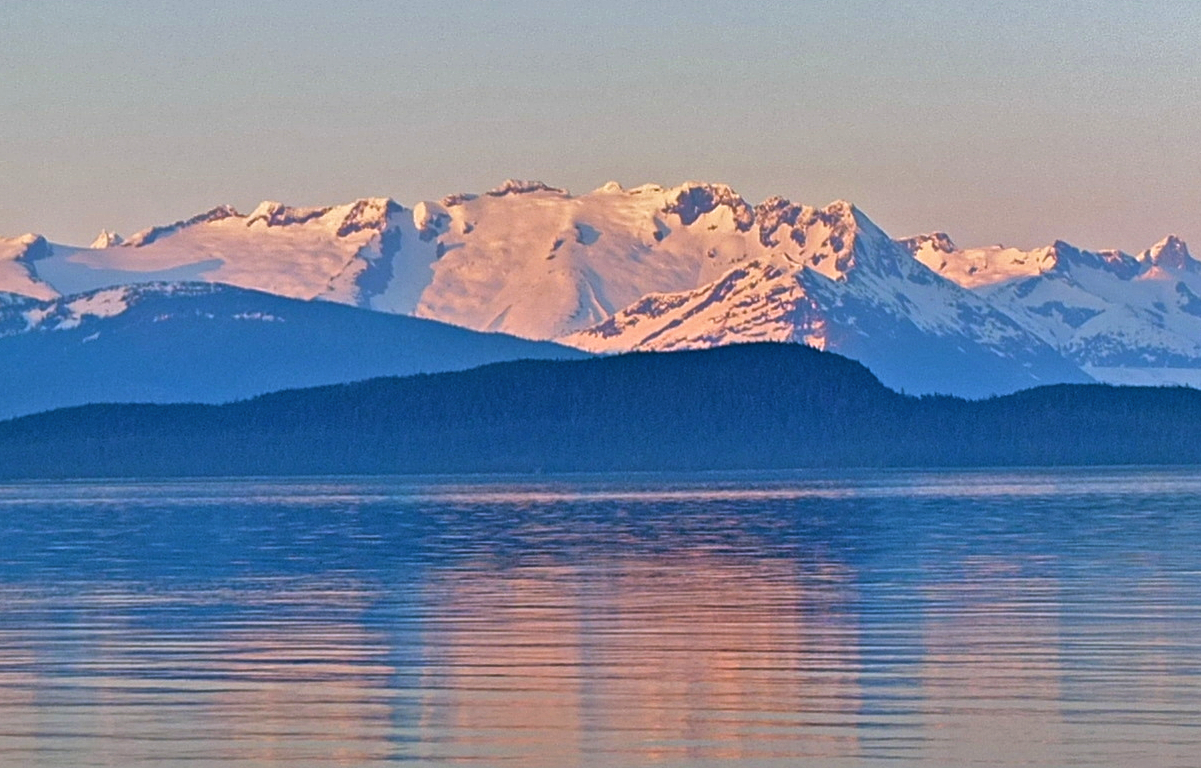
Mount Ernest Gruening, west aspect across Lynn Canal

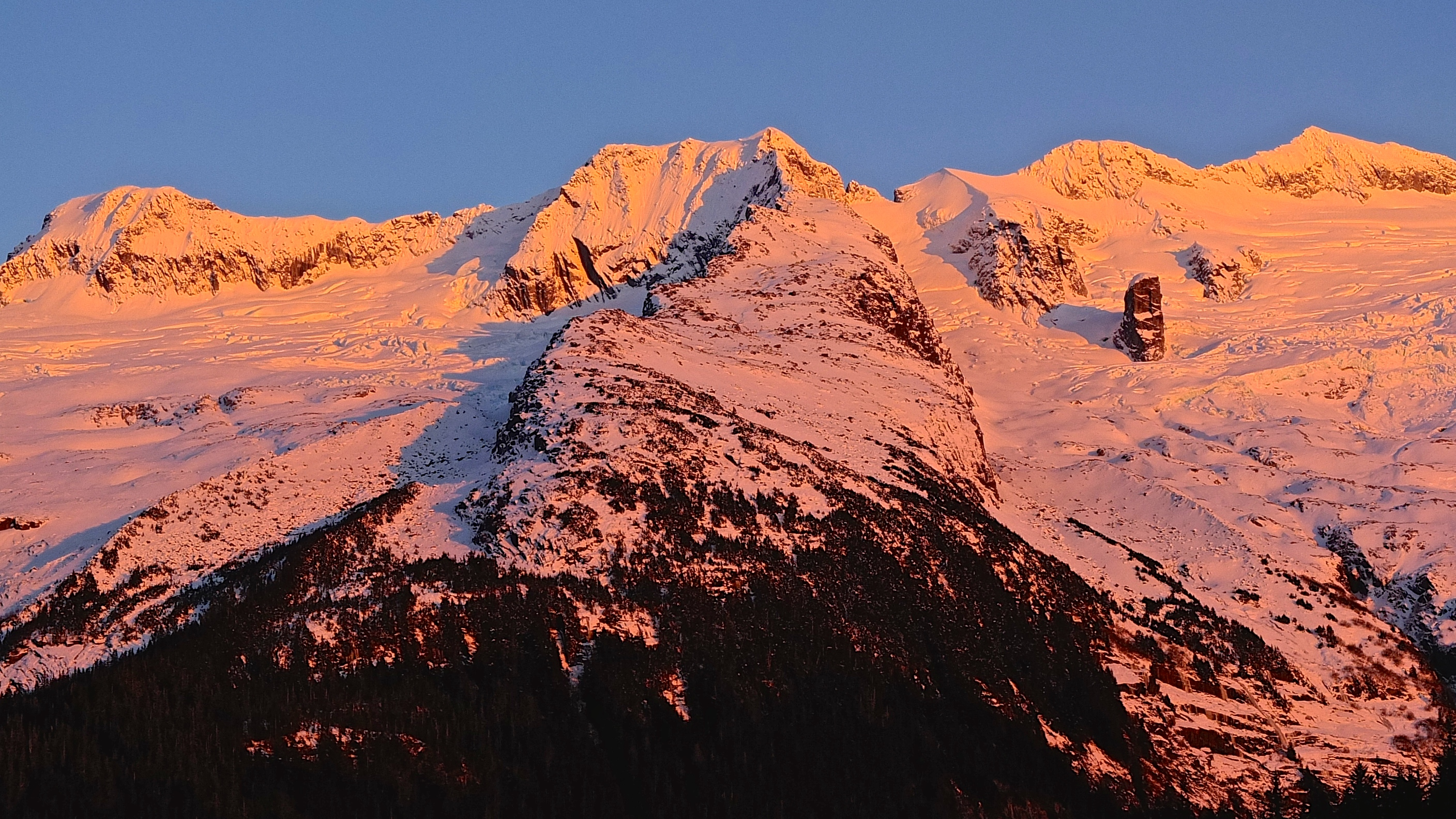
Sunset on Mount Ernest Gruening

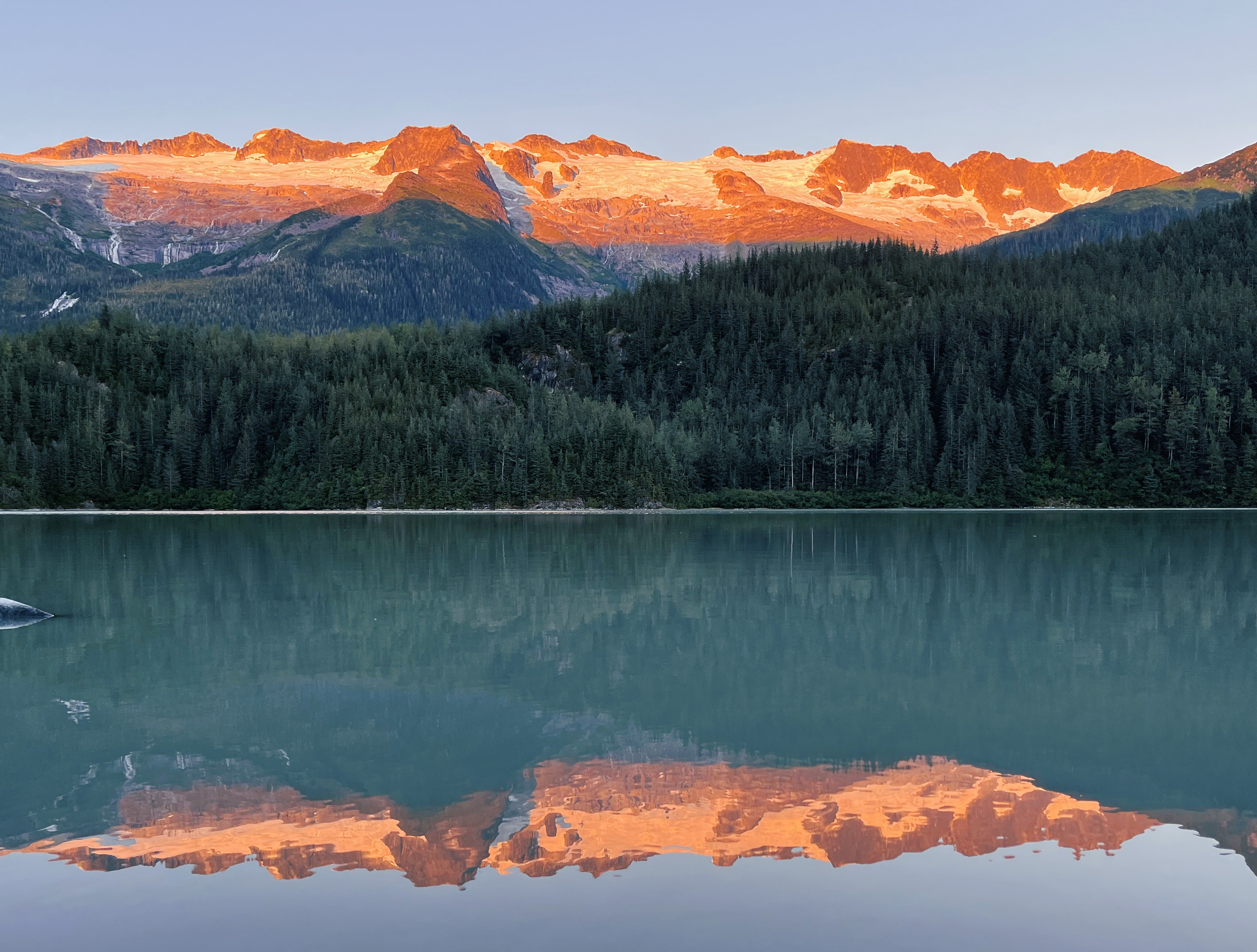
West aspect of Mt. Ernest Gruening from Eagle Glacier Cabin at sunset.

== See also ==
- List of mountain peaks of Alaska
- Geography of Alaska
