= Horn Spire =

Mountain in Alaska, U.S.

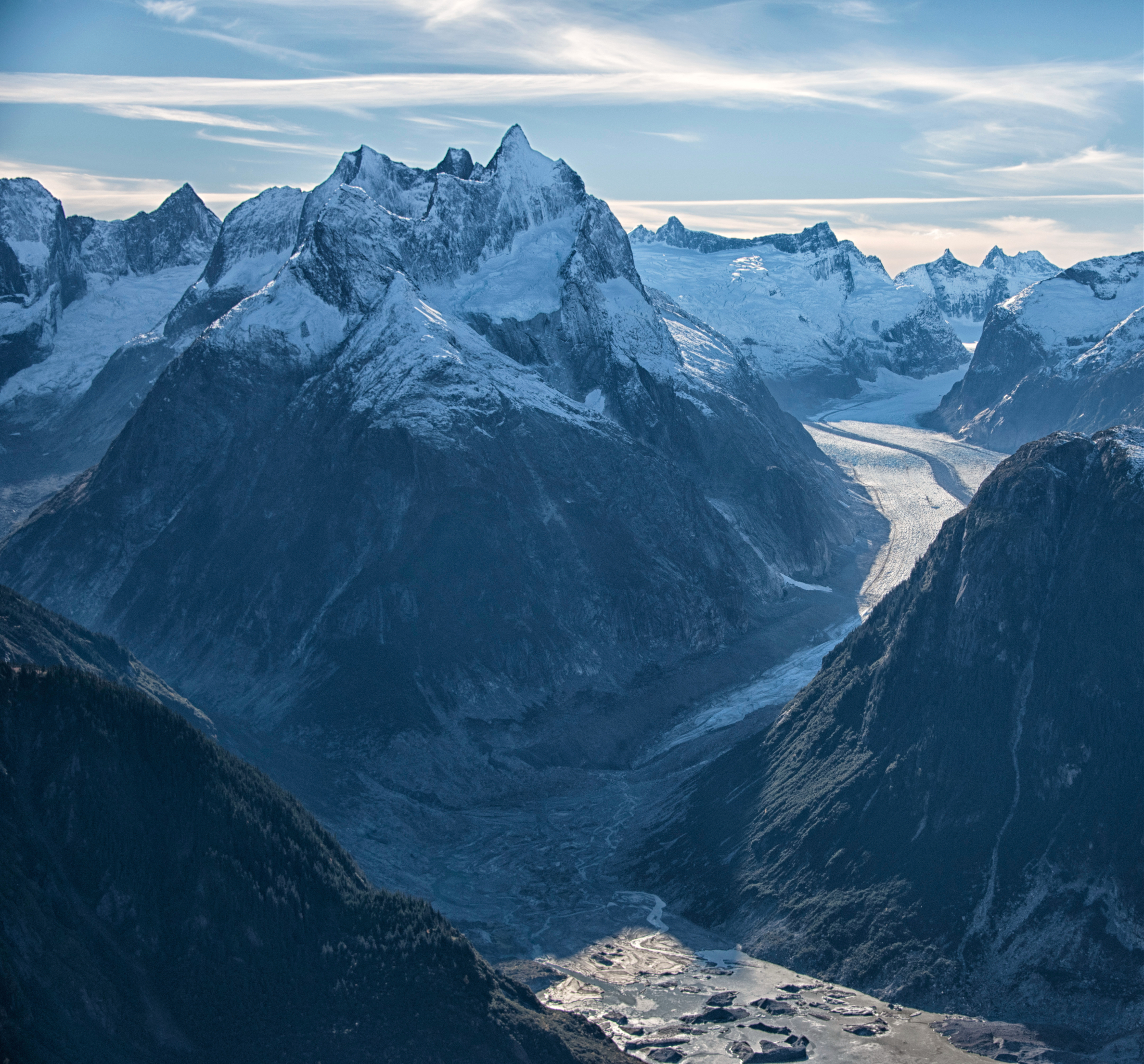
- Horn Spire, north aspect

Highest point
- Elevation: 6,700+ ft (2,040+ m)
- Prominence: 1,400 ft (430 m)
- Parent peak: The Snow Towers
- Isolation: 7.07 mi (11.38 km)
- Coordinates: 58°42′56″N 134°37′12″W

Geography
- Location within Alaska
- Interactive map of Horn Spire
- Country: United States
- State: Alaska
- Borough: Juneau
- Protected area: Tongass National Forest
- Parent range: Coast Mountains; Boundary Ranges; Juneau Icefield
- Topo map: USGS Juneau C-2

Climbing
- First ascent: 1973 Dick Benedict, Gerry Buckley, Craig Lingle, Bruce Tickell
- Easiest route: class 5.9

Horn Spire is a 6,700+ ft (2,040+ m) mountain summit located in the Boundary Ranges of the Coast Mountains, in the U.S. state of Alaska. The peak is situated between the Thiel Glacier and Battle Glacier at the northwest extent of the Juneau Icefield, 31 mi (50 km) north-northwest of Juneau, Alaska, and 12 mi (19 km) east of Lynn Canal, on land managed by Tongass National Forest. Horn Spire is the highest point of the Icefall Spires, and although modest in elevation, relief is significant since the north face of the mountain rises over 4,700 feet above the Thiel Glacier in less than one mile. The peak's descriptive name was submitted in 1965 by Maynard Miller, director of the Juneau Icefield Research Project, and officially adopted that same year by the U.S. Board on Geographic Names. The first ascent of the peak was made June 30, 1973, by Dick Benedict, Gerry Buckley, Craig Lingle, and Bruce Tickell.

== Climate ==
Based on the Köppen climate classification, Horn Spire has a subarctic climate with cold, snowy winters, and cool summers. Weather systems coming off the Gulf of Alaska are forced upwards by the Coast Mountains (orographic lift), causing heavy precipitation in the form of rainfall and snowfall. Winter temperatures can drop to 0 °F with wind chill factors below −10 °F. The months May and June offer the most favorable weather for viewing this rarely climbed peak.

== Gallery ==
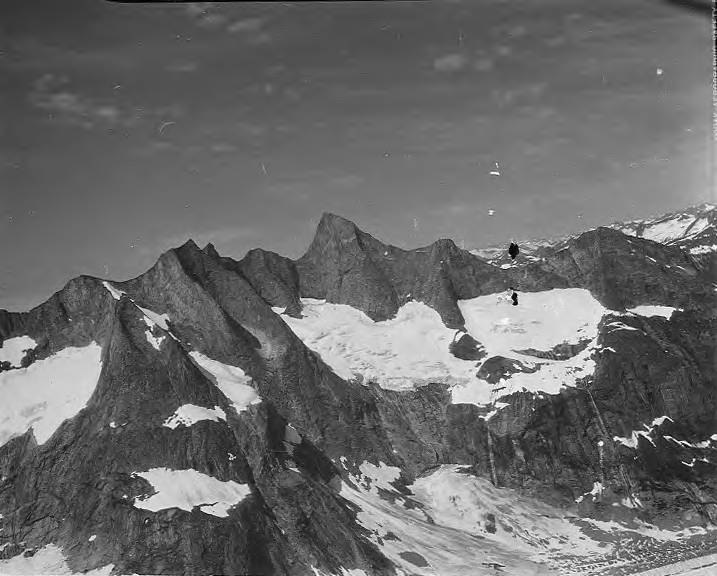
Southeast aspect

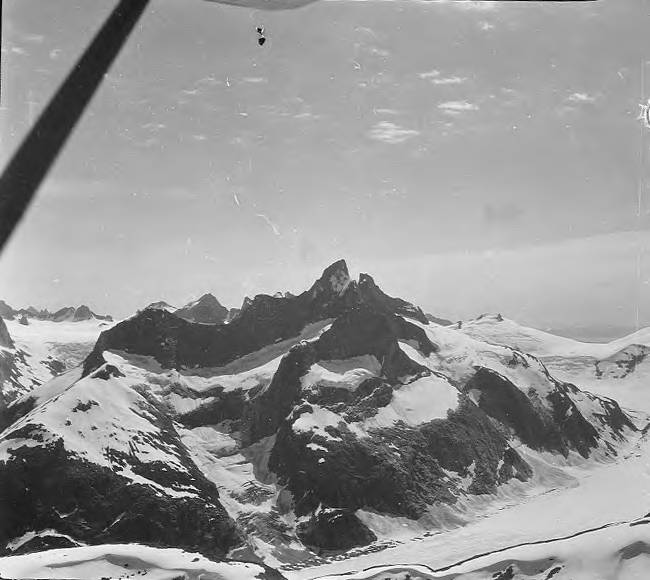
North aspect

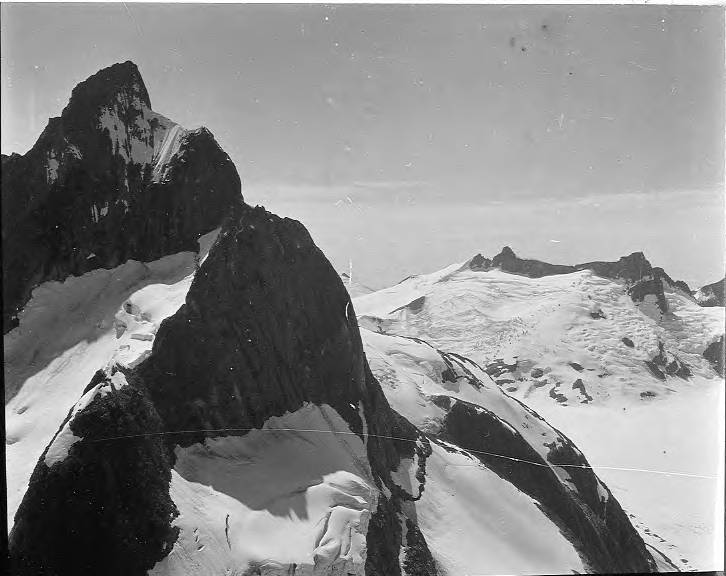
Horn Spire (left), with Mount Adolph Knopf (right)

== See also ==
- List of mountain peaks of Alaska
- Geography of Alaska
