= Snowpatch Crag =

Mountain in Alaska, United States

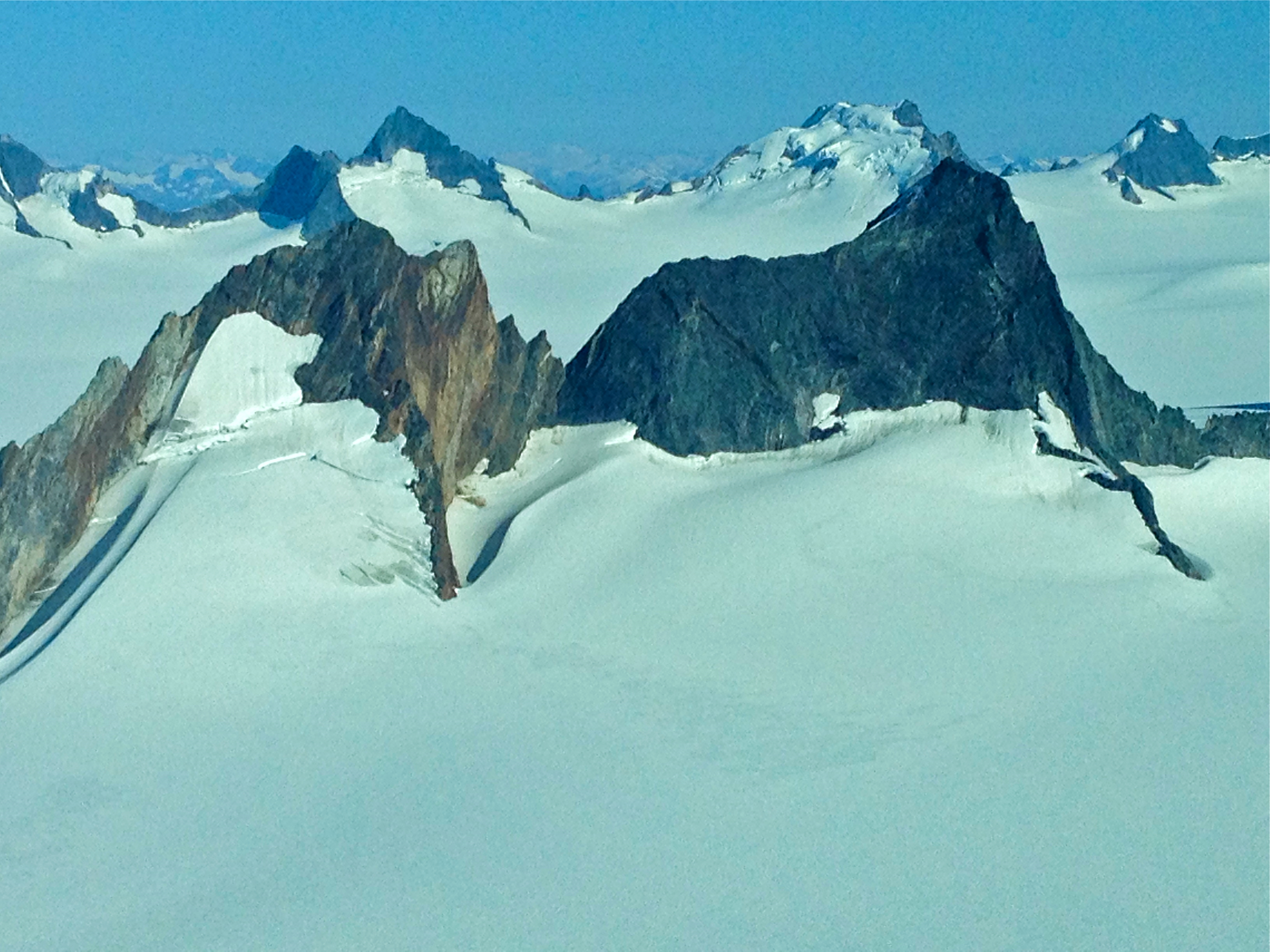
- Snowpatch Crag, northwest aspect (Taku Towers and Emperor Peak in the distance)

Highest point
- Elevation: 6,345 ft (1,934 m)
- Prominence: 1,045 ft (319 m)
- Parent peak: The Snow Towers
- Isolation: 1.07 mi (1.72 km)
- Coordinates: 58°39′06″N 134°29′33″W

Geography
- Location within Alaska
- Location: Tongass National Forest; Juneau Borough; Alaska, United States
- Parent range: Coast Mountains; Boundary Ranges; Juneau Icefield
- Topo map: USGS Juneau C-2

Snowpatch Crag is a 6,345 ft (1,930 m) elevation glaciated mountain summit located in the Boundary Ranges of the Coast Mountains, in the U.S. state of Alaska. Snowpatch Crag is a nunatak surrounded by the Taku Glacier, and is situated near the west side of the Juneau Icefield, 25 mi (40 km) north of Juneau, and 1.8 mi (3 km) northeast of The Snow Towers, on land managed by Tongass National Forest. The mountain was named by members of the Juneau Icefield Research Project in 1964, and was officially adopted in 1965 by the U.S. Board on Geographic Names. Variant names for this geographic feature are "Snowpatch Peak" and "Snowpatch Craig."

== Climate ==
Based on the Köppen climate classification, Snowpatch Crag is located in a subpolar oceanic climate zone, with long, cold, wet winters, and cool summers. Weather systems coming off the Gulf of Alaska are forced upwards by the Coast Mountains (orographic lift), causing heavy precipitation in the form of rainfall and snowfall. Temperatures can drop below −20 °C with wind chill factors below −30 °C. The months May and June offer the most favorable weather for viewing this peak.

== See also ==
- Geospatial summary of the High Peaks/Summits of the Juneau Icefield
- Geography of Alaska
