= Aaron Waters =

Aaron Waters may refer to:

- Ron Wasserman, also known as Aaron Waters, American musician
- Aaron C. Waters, American geologist, petrologist, and volcanologist
