= Mustang Peak (Coast Mountains, Alaska) =

Mountain in Alaska, United States

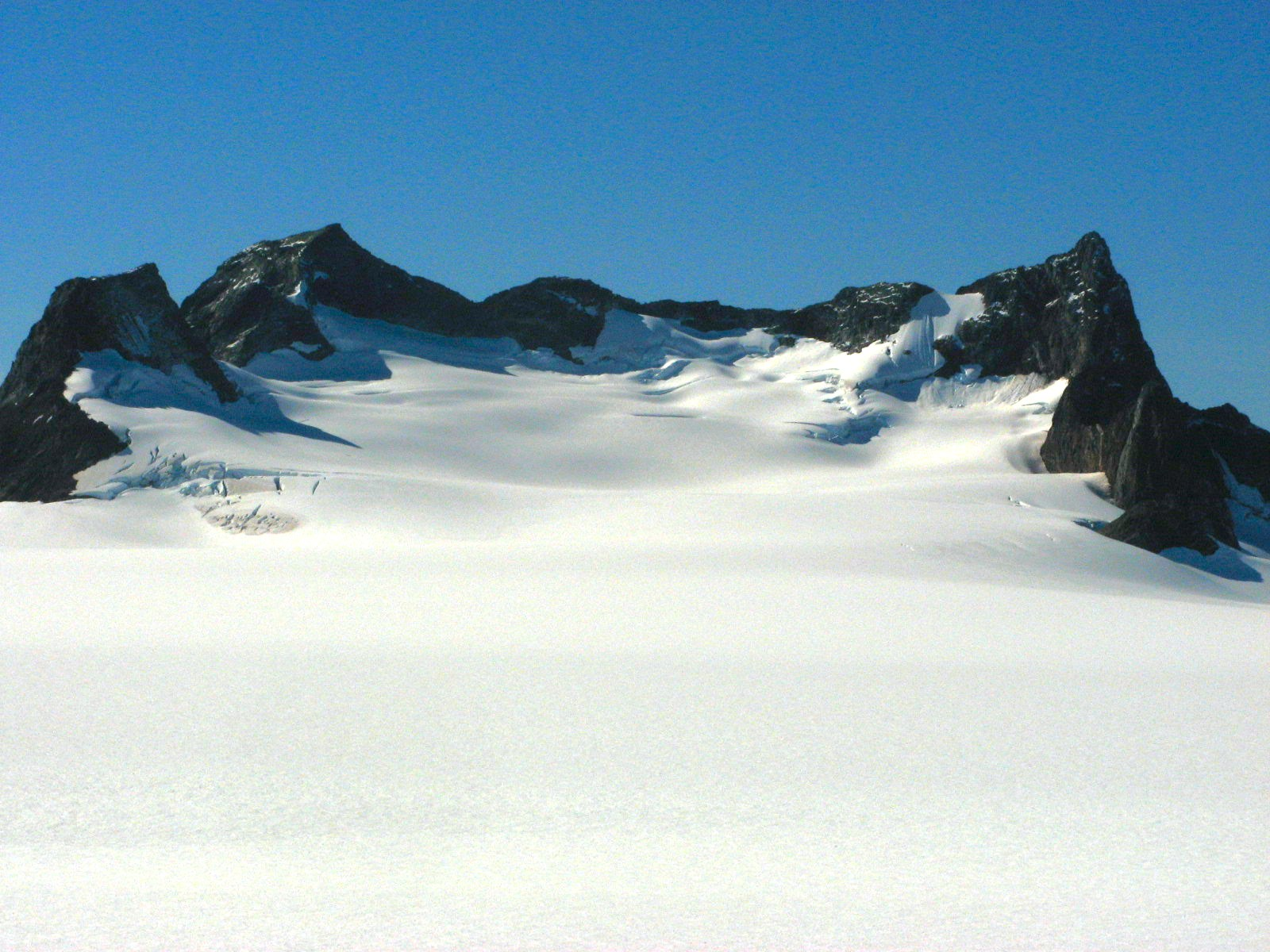
- East aspect of Mustang Peak to left (Dike Mountain to right)

Highest point
- Elevation: 6,720 ft (2,048 m)
- Prominence: 1,400 ft (427 m)
- Parent peak: The Snow Towers
- Isolation: 2.95 mi (4.75 km)
- Coordinates: 58°38′41″N 134°35′28″W

Geography
- Location within Alaska
- Country: United States
- State: Alaska
- Borough: Juneau
- Protected area: Tongass National Forest
- Parent range: Coast Mountains; Boundary Ranges; Juneau Icefield
- Topo map: USGS Juneau C-2

Geology
- Rock age: Late Cretaceous
- Mountain type: Nunatak
- Rock type: Granitic
- Volcanic arc: Coast Range Arc

Mustang Peak is a 6,720-foot-elevation (2,048-meter) glaciated mountain summit located in the Boundary Ranges of the Coast Mountains, in the U.S. state of Alaska. It is situated 25 miles (40 km) north-northwest of Juneau along the western side of the Juneau Icefield, on land managed by Tongass National Forest. Topographic relief is significant as the summit rises 1,200 feet (366 m) above the Eagle Glacier in 0.25 mi (0.40 km). Neighbors include Dike Mountain 0.8 mi (1.3 km) to the north, and The Snow Towers three miles (4.8 km) to the southeast. Mustang Peak was named by members of the Juneau Icefield Research Project in 1964, and the toponym was officially adopted in 1965 by the U.S. Board on Geographic Names.

== Climate ==
Based on the Köppen climate classification, Mustang Peak is located in a subpolar oceanic climate zone, with long, cold, wet winters, and cool summers. Most weather fronts originate in the Pacific Ocean, and travel east toward the Coast Mountains where they are forced upward by the range (orographic lift), causing them to drop their moisture in the form of rain or snowfall. As a result, the Coast Mountains experience high precipitation, especially during the winter months in the form of snowfall. Winter temperatures can drop below −20 °C with wind chill factors below −30 °C. This climate supports the West Branch Taku Glacier and Eagle Glacier surrounding the peak. The months of May and June offer the most favorable weather for viewing this peak.

== Gallery ==
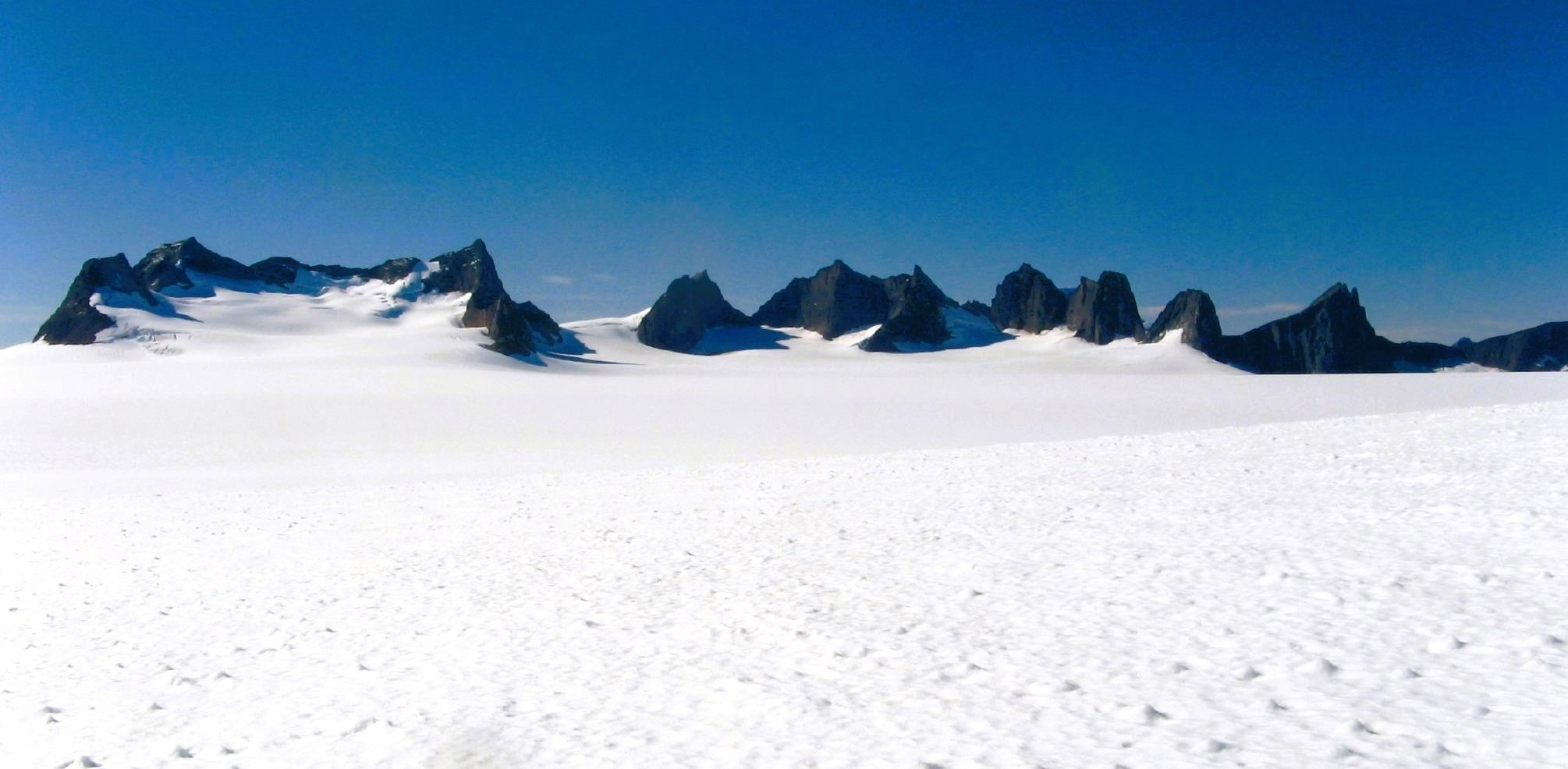
Mustang Peak and Dike Mountain to the left with unnamed nunataks to the right. Viewed from the Juneau Icefield.

== See also ==
- Geospatial summary of the High Peaks/Summits of the Juneau Icefield
- Geography of Alaska
