= Alfred Woodford =

American geologist

Alfred Oswald Woodford
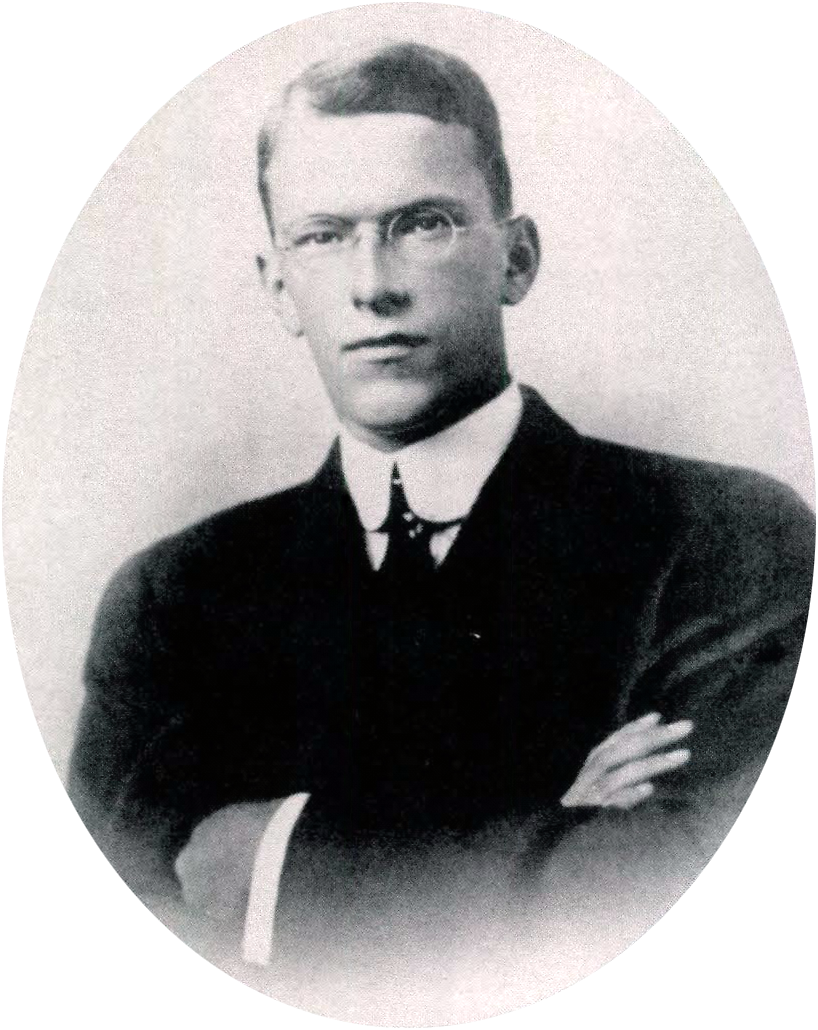
- Woodford as a student, c. 1910
- Born: February 27, 1890; Upland, California, US
- Died: June 29, 1990 (aged 100); Claremont, California, US
- Education: Pomona College (B.A.); University of California, Berkeley (Ph.D)
- Occupation: Geologist
- Employer: Pomona College
- Spouse: Gwendolyn Green (m. 1929; died 1982)
- Children: 2
- Parents: Butler A. Woodford (father); Emma B. Harwood (mother)

Alfred Oswald Woodford (February 27, 1890 – June 29, 1990) was an American geologist. He was the founding director of the geology department at Pomona College, where he taught for four decades.

He was nicknamed "Woody".

== Early life and education ==
Woodford was born in Upland, California, on February 27, 1890, to a family of successful citrus farmers. He moved with his family to neighboring Claremont in 1909, and graduated from Pomona College (where he was editor of The Student Life) with a degree in chemistry in 1913. He subsequently pursued graduate work in soil chemistry at the University of California, Berkeley, and received his doctorate in 1921.

== Career ==
Woodford joined the chemistry department at Pomona in 1915 or 1916, while he was pursuing his doctorate. In 1919 or 1920, he began teaching geology, and he established the college's geology department in 1921 or 1922. He was Pomona's sole geology professor for two decades, until his former student John Shelton joined him in 1941. His academic specialties included California geology, stream hydraulics, and the history of geology.

Woodford taught many students who went on to have notable careers, including Rollin Eckis, Roger Revelle, Charles A. Anderson, Mason Hill, and R. Dana Russell. Several were involved in California's oil industry. From 1920 to 1940, Pomona graduated more geologists on a per capita basis who became listed in American Men of Science than any other institution.

In 1951, Woodford published a geology textbook with James Gilluly and Aaron C. Waters, Principles of Geology, which became the standard instruction for the subject. He published a history of the field, Historical Geology, in 1965.

== Personal life ==
Woodford married Gwendolyn Green in 1929, a partnership that lasted until her death in 1982. He had two daughters, Marjorie and Betsy.

In his spare time, he played bridge and supported Pomona's athletics program.

== Retirement and death ==
Woodford retired from teaching in 1955, although he continued to engage with students into his 90s. In 1972, he served as president of the National Association of Geologists.

A centenarian, he died on June 29, 1990, at Pilgrim Place, a retirement community in Claremont.

== Recognition ==
Upon his retirement, Woodford was awarded the Neil A. Miner Award, the highest honor bestowed by the National Association of Geoscience Teachers. In 1971, Pomona granted him an honorary doctorate.
