= Cathedral Peak (Alaska) =

Mountain summit in Boundary Ranges in Alaska

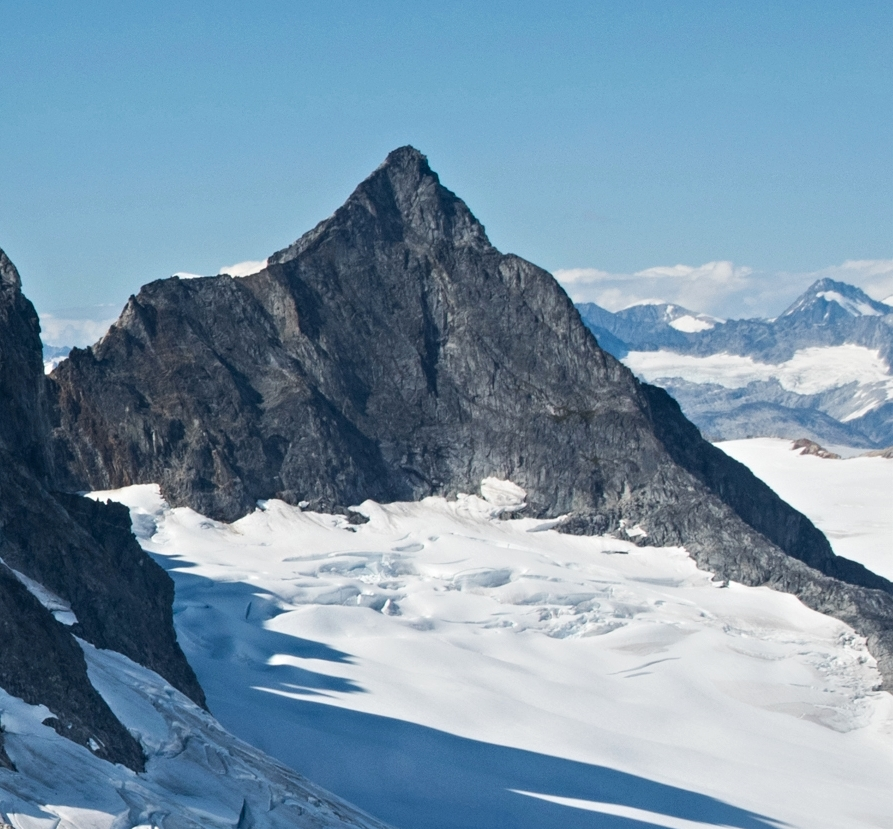
- Cathedral Peak, south face

Highest point
- Elevation: 6,500+ ft (1,980+ m)
- Prominence: 800 ft (240 m)
- Parent peak: Taku Towers
- Isolation: 0.92 mi (1.48 km)
- Coordinates: 58°36′43″N 134°21′56″W

Geography
- Location within Alaska
- Location: Tongass National Forest; Juneau Borough; Alaska, United States
- Parent range: Coast Mountains; Boundary Ranges; Juneau Icefield
- Topo map: USGS Juneau C-2

Cathedral Peak is a 6,500+ ft (1,980+ m) mountain summit located in the Boundary Ranges of the Coast Mountains, in the U.S. state of Alaska. The peak is situated in the Taku Range of the Juneau Icefield, 22 mi (35 km) north of Juneau, and 1 mi (2 km) north of Taku Towers, on land managed by Tongass National Forest. The Taku Range is a north-south trending ridge on the edge of the Taku Glacier. The mountain was named in 1964 by members of the Juneau Icefield Research Project, and officially adopted in 1965 by the U.S. Board on Geographic Names.

== Climate ==
Based on the Köppen climate classification, Cathedral Peak is located in a subpolar oceanic climate zone, with long, cold, snowy winters, and cool summers. Weather systems coming off the Gulf of Alaska are forced upwards by the Coast Mountains (orographic lift), causing heavy precipitation in the form of rainfall and snowfall. Temperatures can drop below −20 °C with wind chill factors below −30 °C. The month of July offers the most favorable weather to view or climb Cathedral Peak.

== See also ==
- List of mountain peaks of Alaska
- Geography of Alaska
