= Taku Towers =

Double-summit mountain in Alaska, U.S.

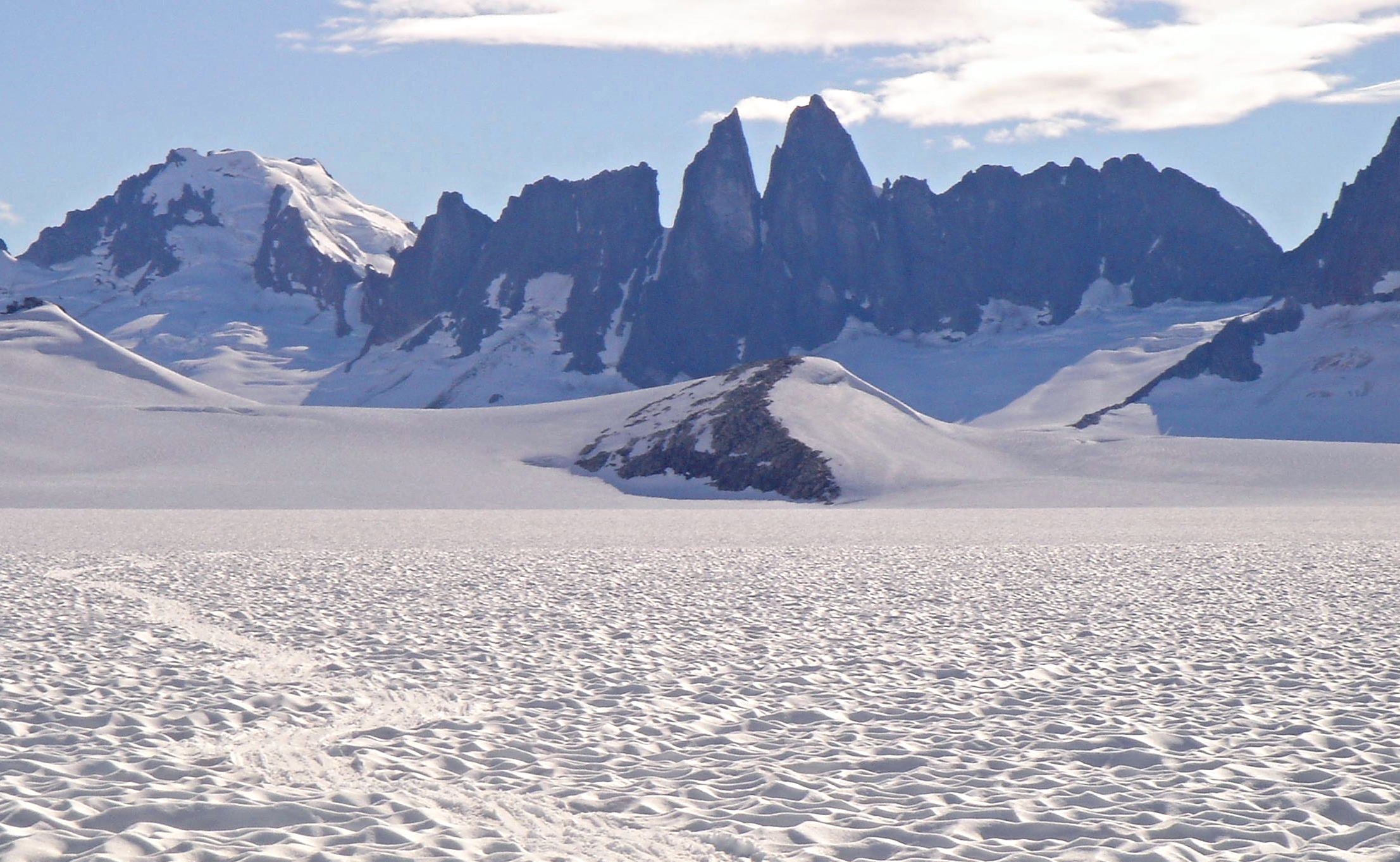
- Taku Towers, centered, east aspect (Emperor Peak to left)

Highest point
- Elevation: 6,653+ ft (2,030+ m)
- Prominence: 1,103 ft (336 m)
- Parent peak: Emperor Peak
- Isolation: 1.2 mi (1.9 km)
- Coordinates: 58°35′58″N 134°22′24″W

Geography
- Location within Alaska
- Interactive map of Taku Towers
- Location: Tongass National Forest; Juneau Borough; Alaska, United States
- Parent range: Coast Mountains; Boundary Ranges; Juneau Icefield
- Topo map: USGS Juneau C-2

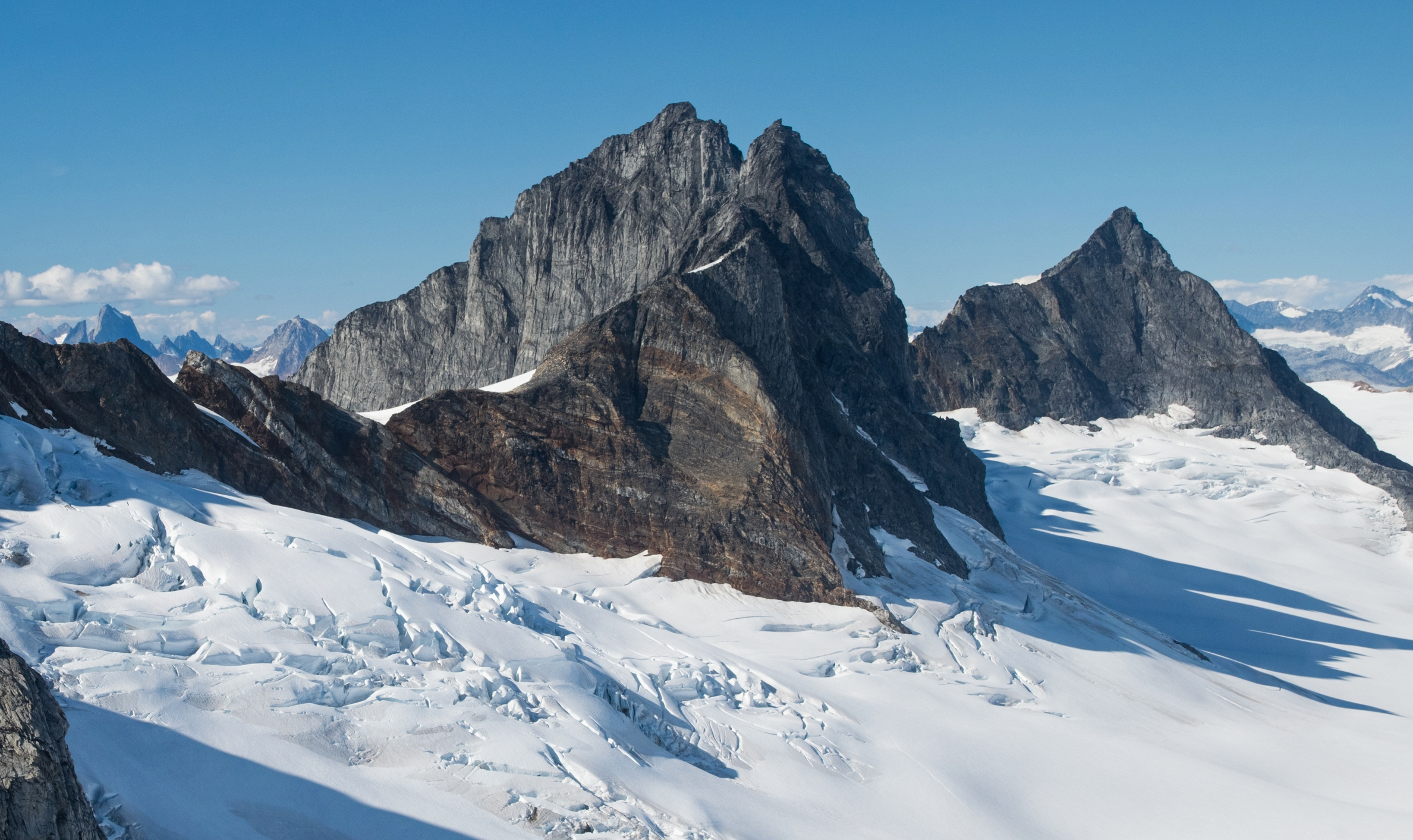
Taku Towers with Cathedral Peak (right)

Taku Towers is a 6,653+ ft (2,030+ m) double summit mountain located in the Boundary Ranges of the Coast Mountains, in the U.S. state of Alaska. The two north and south peaks, 0.2 mi apart with 6,653+ and 6,605-ft elevations respectively, are situated in the Taku Range of the Juneau Icefield, 21 mi (34 km) north of Juneau, Alaska, and 5.5 mi (9 km) east-southeast of The Snow Towers, on land managed by Tongass National Forest. The Taku Range is a north-south trending ridge on the edge of the Taku Glacier. The mountain's name was in local use when first published in 1960 by the U.S. Geological Survey. Several landforms in the vicinity bear this Taku name, which all ultimately derive from the Taku people. The first ascent was made in 1949 by Forbes, Merritt, and Schoeblen via the west ridge. Daniel Reid and party made the first ascent of the difficult east face of South Taku Tower in 1973.

== Climate ==
Based on the Köppen climate classification, Taku Towers is located in a subpolar oceanic climate zone, with long, cold, snowy winters, and cool summers. Weather systems coming off the Gulf of Alaska are forced upwards by the Coast Mountains (orographic lift), causing heavy precipitation in the form of rainfall and snowfall. Winter temperatures can drop below −20 °C with wind chill factors below −30 °C. The month of July offers the most favorable weather to view or climb Taku Towers.

== See also ==
- Cathedral Peak
- Geography of Alaska
- Geospatial summary of the High Peaks/Summits of the Juneau Icefield
