= Mount Adolph Knopf =

Mountain in Alaska, United States

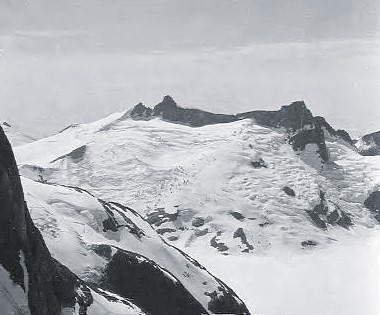
- Northeast aspect

Highest point
- Elevation: 6,200 ft (1,890 m)
- Prominence: 1,900 ft (579 m)
- Parent peak: Peak 6550
- Isolation: 3.35 mi (5.39 km)
- Coordinates: 58°40′42″N 134°42′16″W

Geography
- Location within Alaska
- Interactive map of Mount Adolph Knopf
- Country: United States
- State: Alaska
- Borough: Juneau
- Protected area: Tongass National Forest
- Parent range: Coast Mountains; Boundary Ranges; Juneau Icefield
- Topo map: USGS Juneau C-3

Geology
- Rock age: Late Cretaceous
- Rock type: Granitic
- Volcanic arc: Coast Range Arc

Climbing
- First ascent: 2021
- Easiest route: class 5.7

Mount Adolph Knopf is a 6,200-foot-elevation (1,890-meter) glaciated mountain summit located in the Boundary Ranges of the Coast Mountains, in the U.S. state of Alaska. It is situated 28 miles (45 km) north-northwest of Juneau to the western side of the Juneau Icefield, on land managed by Tongass National Forest. Topographic relief is significant as the summit rises 2,200 feet (670 m) above the Eagle Glacier in 0.5 mi (0.80 km) and 3,800 feet (1,158 m) above the Thiel Glacier in 1.25 mi (2.01 km). Precipitation runoff from the mountain's slopes drains to Lynn Canal.

== Climate ==
Based on the Köppen climate classification, Mount Adolph Knopf is located in a subpolar oceanic climate zone, with long, cold, wet winters, and cool summers. Most weather fronts originate in the Pacific Ocean, and travel east toward the Coast Mountains where they are forced upward by the range (orographic lift), causing them to drop their moisture in the form of rain or snowfall. As a result, the Coast Mountains experience high precipitation, especially during the winter months in the form of snowfall. Winter temperatures can drop below 0 °F with wind chill factors below −10 °F. This climate supports the Eagle and Thiel glaciers surrounding the peak.

== History ==
Mount Adolph Knopf's toponym and present location was officially adopted in 1976 by the U.S. Board on Geographic Names to honor Adolph Knopf (1882–1966), American geologist with the U.S. Geological Survey who performed pioneering geologic studies in southeast Alaska in 1909–1910. "Adolph Knopf Mountain" was originally applied in 1968 to the mountain that is now known as Mount Ernest Gruening. The "Adolph Knopf Mountain" toponym was officially changed in 1976 by the U.S. Board on Geographic Names to honor Ernest Gruening, known as "the father of Alaska statehood", the Governor of the Alaska Territory from 1939 through 1953, and one of Alaska's inaugural pair of Senators when Alaska gained statehood in 1959. The Adolph Knopf toponym was concurrently moved to the present peak eight miles north of its previous location.

== Gallery ==
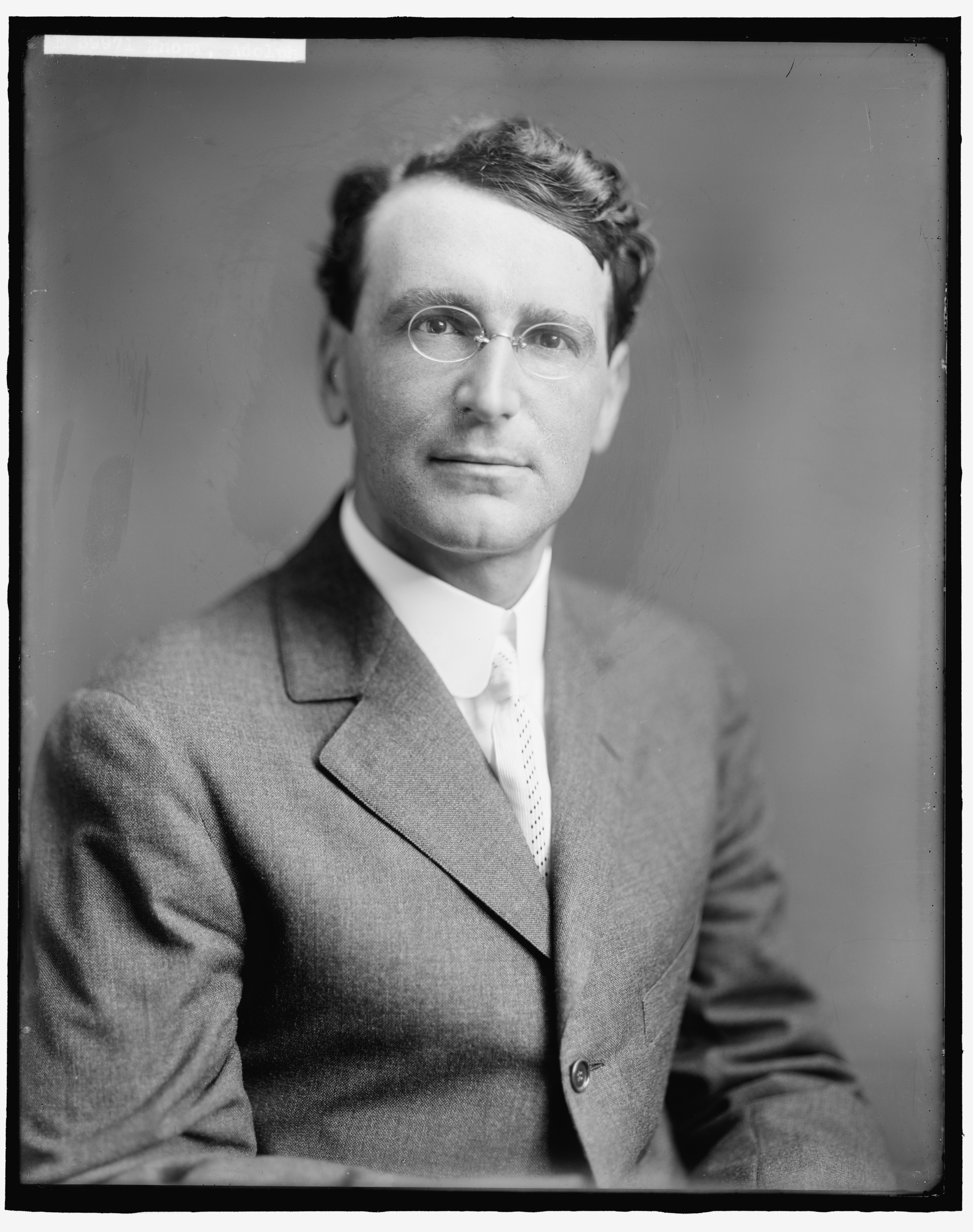
Adolph Knopf, 1905

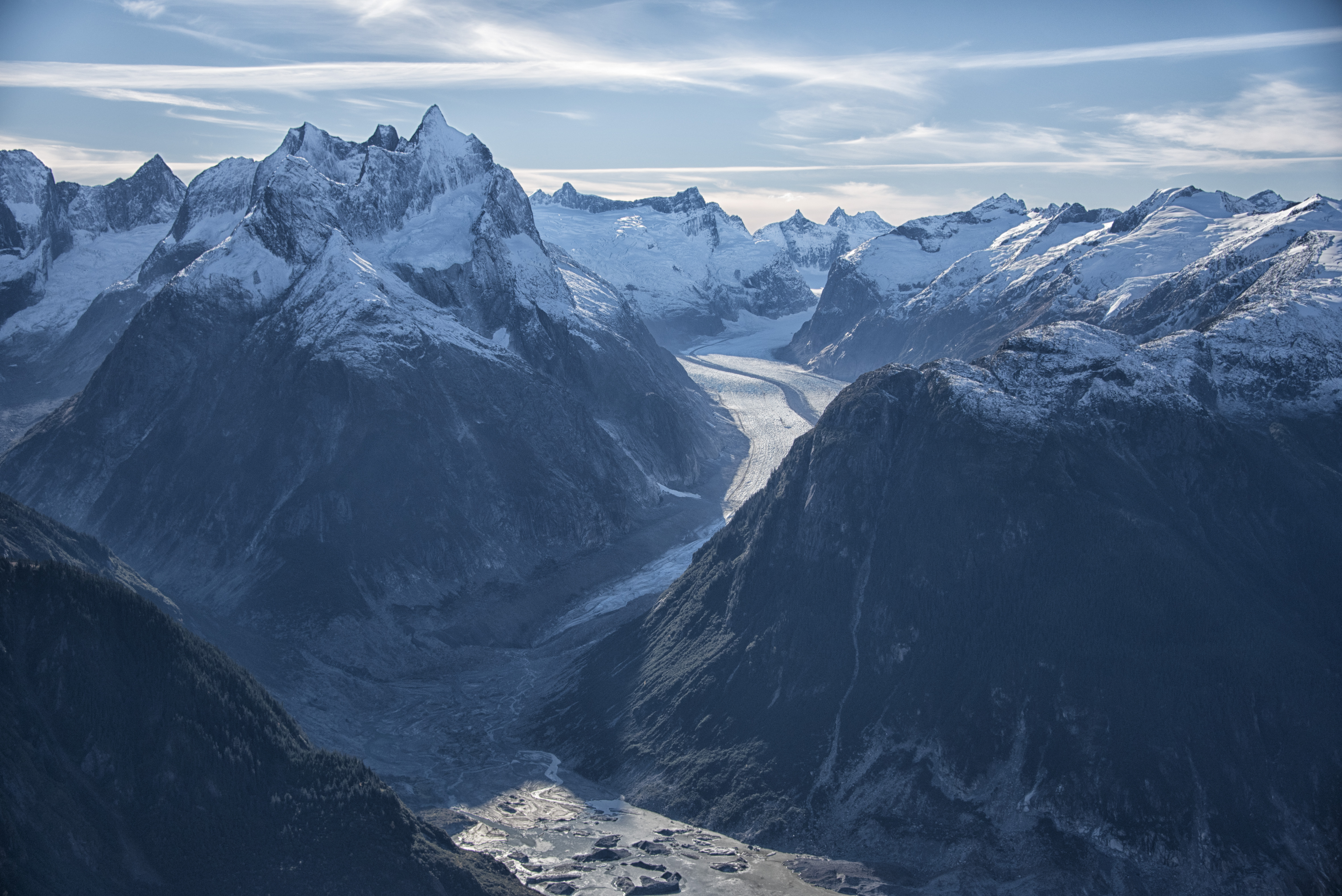
Mount Adolph Knopf centered on skyline. Horn Spire is the prominent peak to left.

== See also ==
- Geography of Alaska
