= Mason Hill (geologist) =

American geologist (1904–1992)

Mason Lowell Hill (January 17, 1904 – March 11, 1992) was an American geologist. He was known for his expertise on earthquakes, and played a leading role in the discovery of oil along the Swanson River, the first commercial oil discovery in Alaska.

== Early life and education ==
Hill was born on January 17, 1904. He attended Pomona College, where he was influenced by professor A. O. Woodford, the founder of the college's geology department, and graduated in 1926.

== Career ==
Hill became the chief geologist for the Richfield Oil Company.

== Retirement and death ==
Hill retired in 1969. He subsequently became a professor. He died of a stroke in his hometown of Whittier, California, on March 11, 1992.
