= Archduke Mountain =

Mountain in British Columbia, Canada

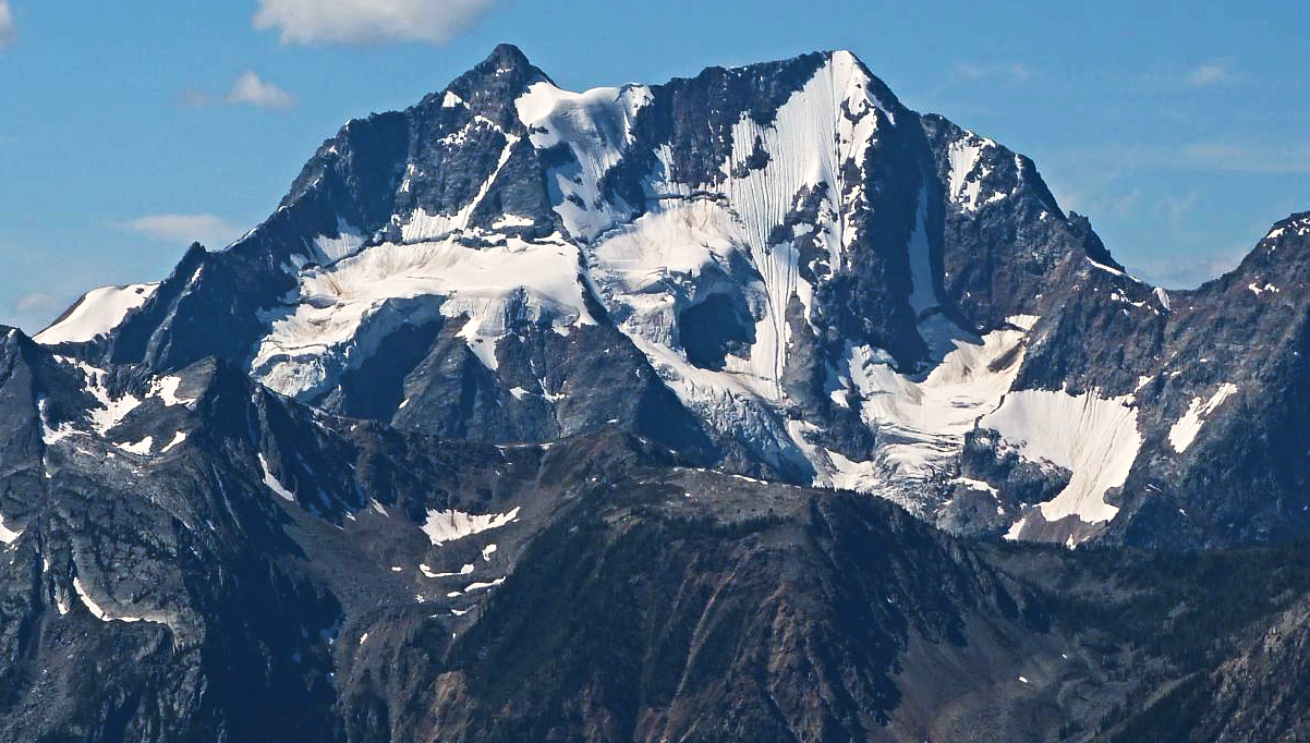
- Emperor-Archduke Massif, northeast aspect Archduke Mountain (left)

Highest point
- Elevation: 3,135 m (10,285 ft)
- Prominence: 585 m (1,919 ft)
- Parent peak: Truce Mountain (3262 m)
- Listing: Mountains of British Columbia
- Coordinates: 50°17′45″N 116°46′23″W

Geography
- Location within British Columbia Location within Canada
- Location: British Columbia, Canada
- District: Kootenay Land District
- Parent range: Purcell Mountains
- Topo map: NTS 82K7 Duncan Lake

Archduke Mountain is a 3,135-metre (10,285-foot) mountain summit located in the Purcell Mountains of British Columbia, Canada. It is situated 43 km (27 mi) north of Kaslo, on the northern boundary of Purcell Wilderness Conservancy Provincial Park and Protected Area. The nearest peak is Emperor Peak, 1 km (0.62 mi) to the west. These two peaks make up the double summit of the Archduke-Emperor massif. The mountain's name was officially adopted June 20, 1972, when approved by the Geographical Names Board of Canada. The mountain's name was submitted by climber Dr. Curt Wagner for Beethoven's Archduke Trio, which was dedicated to Archduke Rudolf of Austria.

== Climate ==
Based on the Köppen climate classification, Archduke Mountain is located in a subarctic climate zone with cold, snowy winters, and mild summers. Temperatures can drop below −20 °C with wind chill factors below −30 °C. Precipitation runoff from the mountain and meltwater from its glaciers drains into tributaries of the Duncan River.

== See also ==
- Geography of British Columbia
