= Aaron C. Waters =

American geologist

- Born: May 6, 1905; Waterville, Washington, United States
- Died: May 18, 1991 (aged 86); Tacoma, Washington
- Education: University of Washington; Yale University
- Awards: Penrose Medal (1982)
- Scientific career
- Fields: Geology
- Workplaces: Stanford University; United States Geological Survey; Johns Hopkins University; University of California, Santa Barbara; University of California, Santa Cruz
- Academic advisors: Adolph Knopf
- Doctoral students: Konrad B. Krauskopf; James G. Moore

Aaron Clement Waters (1905–1991) was an American geologist, petrologist, and volcanologist, known for his pioneering work on the Columbia River Basalt.

== Biography ==
Aaron C. Waters was born as the youngest of seven children of parents who were pioneers in Washington state and grew wheat at their homestead. He graduated in geology from the University of Washington with a B.Sc. in 1927 and an M.Sc. in 1928. He graduated with a Ph.D. in geology in 1930 from Yale University. His doctoral dissertation Geology of the Southern Half of the Chelan [30′] Quadrangle, Washington was supervised by Adolph Knopf. From 1930 to 1951 Waters held an appointment as a faculty member at Stanford University. He was leave of absence for the arcademic year 1937–1938 and during WW II from 1942 to 1945. For the academic year 1937–1938 he was a Guggenheim Fellow and did research in Scotland and Scandinavia. In 1940 he married Elizabeth von Hoene, who was then a student at Mills College. During their marriage, she often accompanied him in his fieldwork and served as camp cook. After the attack on Pearl Harbor, the United States Geological Survey (USGS) expanded its search for strategic minerals. Waters went on an extended leave of absence to serve in the USGS — the main focus of his work was on mercury deposits. He first worked in Arkansas and then in several western states. Before the end of WW II he was sent to search for other metal ores in different parts of the USA. In 1945 he returned to his professorial duties at Stanford and began to focus on basalts and other volcanic rocks of the Pacific Northwest. Waters, in collaboration with James Gilluly and Alfred Woodford, wrote a textbook Principles of Geology, which was published by W. H. Freeman and Company in 1951. The Principles of Geology went through 4 editions and for more than two decades remained the leading introductory textbook for geology. Waters acquired expertise concerning uranium ores and from 1951 to 1952 participated in the USGS's exploration for uranium ores on the Colorado Plateau.

In 1952 Waters resigned from Stanford University to accept an appointment at Johns Hopkins University, where he was a professor from 1952 to 1963. From 1963 to 1967 he was a professor and chair of the geology department at the University of California, Santa Barbara. From 1967 to 1972 he was a professor at the University of California, Santa Cruz. There he established a Ph.D. program in earth sciences and retired as professor emeritus in 1972. During his years as a professor at U.C. Santa Cruz, he worked with Richard Virgil Fisher on maar volcanism.

In retirement as professor emeritus, Waters occasionally taught part-time at the University of Satan Cruz and held visiting professorships at Oregon State University, the University of Texas at El Paso, and California State University, Los Angeles. As professor emeritus, he also worked as a research consultant for the USGS and Los Alamos National Laboratory.

Waters was elected in 1964 a Member of the National Academy of Sciences and in 1966 a Member of the American Academy of Arts and Sciences. In 1982 he was awarded the Penrose Medal of the Geological Society of America.

In 1983 Aaron and Elizabeth Waters settled in Tacoma, where he continued to write about geology and pursue his hobby of gardening. Upon his death in 1991, he was survived by his widow, their two daughters, and three grandchildren.

== Research ==
Waters was a leading expert on the geology of the Pacific Northwest. He did research on volcanology, igneous and metamorphic petrology, geomorphology, and tectonics. With Konrad B. Krauskopf, he did important fieldwork on protoplastic deformation found in the Colville batholith. Waters was the author or co-author of classic articles on determining the directions of flow in volcanic rocks and on documenting the characteristics of volcanic base surge deposits.

As a participant in the Apollo program, he contributed to research on lunar geology, including composition and origin of the lunar surface and assessment of Apollo landing sites. He was involved in the geological training of the astronauts, including those astronauts who later made lunar landings.

== Selected publications ==
=== Articles ===
- Fuller, Richard E.; Waters, Aaron Clement (1929). "The Nature and Origin of the Horst and Graben Structure of Southern Oregon". The Journal of Geology. 37 (3): 204–238. Bibcode:1929JG.....37..204F. doi:10.1086/623616.
- Waters, Aaron Clement (1932). "A Petrologic and Structural Study of the Swakane Gneiss, Entiat Mountains, Washington". The Journal of Geology. 40 (7): 604–633. Bibcode:1932JG.....40..604W. doi:10.1086/623984.
- Waters, A. C. (1933). "Terraces and Coulees Along the Columbia River Near Lake Chelan, Washington". Geological Society of America Bulletin. 44 (4): 783–820. Bibcode:1933GSAB...44..783W. doi:10.1130/GSAB-44-783.
- Wells, F. G.; Waters, A. C. (1935). "Basaltic rocks in the Umpqua formation". Geological Society of America Bulletin. 46 (6): 961–972. Bibcode:1935GSAB...46..961W. doi:10.1130/GSAB-46-961.
- Waters, A. C. (1938). "Petrology of the contact breccias of the Chelan batholith". Geological Society of America Bulletin. 49 (5): 763–794. Bibcode:1938GSAB...49..763W. doi:10.1130/GSAB-49-763.
- Waters, A. C. (1939). "Resurrected Erosion Surface in Central Washington". Geological Society of America Bulletin. 50 (4): 635–660. Bibcode:1939GSAB...50..635W. doi:10.1130/GSAB-50-635.
- Waters, A. C.; Krauskopf, K. (1941). "Protoclastic border of the Colville batholith". Geological Society of America Bulletin. 52 (9): 1355–1418. Bibcode:1941GSAB...52.1355W. doi:10.1130/GSAB-52-1355.
- Brown, Ralph Eugene; Waters, Aaron Clement (1951). "Quicksilver Deposits of the Bonanza-Nonpareil District, Douglas County, Oregon" (PDF). Bulletin No. 955-F, US Geological Survey: 225–251. Bibcode:1951usgs.rept....3B.
- Waters, A. C. (1955). "Volcanic Rocks and the Tectonic Cycle". In Poldervaart, Arie (ed.). Crust of the Earth: A Symposium. Vol. 62. pp. 703–722. doi:10.1130/SPE62-p703. table of contents ISBN 9780813720623
- Waters, Aaron C. (1955). "Geomorphology of South-Central Washington, Illustrated by the Yakima East Quadrangle". Geological Society of America Bulletin. 66 (6): 663–684. doi:10.1130/0016-7606(1955)66[663:GOSWIB]2.0.CO;2. ISSN 0016-7606.
- Hunt, Charles B. (1958). "Origin and evolution of the magmas by Aaron C. Waters and Charles B. Hunt". Structural and igneous geology of the La Sal Mountains, Utah (PDF). U.S. Geological Survey Special Paper 294. pp. 348–355.
- Waters, A. C. (1960). "Determining direction of flow in basalts". American Journal of Science. 258 A: 350–366.
- Waters, A. C. (1961). "Stratigraphic and lithologic variations in the Columbia River basalt". American Journal of Science. 259 (8): 583–611. Bibcode:1961AmJS..259..583W. doi:10.2475/ajs.259.8.583.
- Hopson, Clifford A.; Waters, Aaron C.; Bender, V. R.; Rubin, Meyer (1962). "The Latest Eruptions from Mount Rainier Volcano". The Journal of Geology. 70 (6): 635–647. Bibcode:1962JG.....70..635H. doi:10.1086/626863.
- Waters, Aaron C. (1962). "Basalt Magma Types and Their Tectonic Associations: Pacific Northwest of the United States". In MacDonald, Gordon A.; Kuno, Hisashi (eds.). The Crust of the Pacific Basin. Geophysical Monograph Series. pp. 158–170. doi:10.1029/GM006p0158. ISBN 978-1-118-66931-0. 2013 edition. ISBN 978-1-118-66931-0.
- Fisher, R. V.; Waters, A. C. (1969). "Bed Forms in Base-Surge Deposits: Lunar Implications". Science. 165 (3900): 1349–1352. Bibcode:1969Sci...165.1349F. doi:10.1126/science.165.3900.1349. PMID 17817881.
- Fisher, R. V.; Waters, A. C. (1970). "Base surge bed forms in maar volcanoes". American Journal of Science. 268 (2): 157–180. Bibcode:1970AmJS..268..157F. doi:10.2475/ajs.268.2.157.
- Griggs, G. B.; Kulm, L. D.; Waters, A. C.; Fowler, G. A. (1970). "Deep-Sea Gravel from Cascadia Channel". The Journal of Geology. 78 (5): 611–619. Bibcode:1970JG.....78..611G. doi:10.1086/627560.
- Waters, Aaron C.; Fisher, Richard V. (1971). "Base surges and their deposits: Capelinhos and Taal Volcanoes". Journal of Geophysical Research. 76 (23): 5596–5614. Bibcode:1971JGR....76.5596W. doi:10.1029/jb076i023p05596.
- Schmincke, Hans-Ulrich; Fisher, Richard V.; Waters, Aaron C. (1973). "Antidune and chute and pool structures in the base surge deposits of the Laacher See area, Germany". Sedimentology. 20 (4): 553–574. Bibcode:1973Sedim..20..553S. doi:10.1111/j.1365-3091.1973.tb01632.x.
- Goodell, Philip C.; Waters, Aaron C. (1981). Uranium in Volcanic and Volcaniclastic Rocks. doi:10.1306/St13421. ISBN 978-1-6298-1181-9.

=== Books and monographs ===
- Gilluly, James; Waters, A. C.; Woodford, A. O. (1975). Principles of Geology (4th ed.). San Francisco: W. H. Freeman. 1st edition. 1951. 2nd edition. 1959. 3rd edition. 1968.
- Fiske, Richard S.; Hopson, Clifford Andrae; Waters, Aaron Clement (1963). Geology of Mount Rainier National Park. U.S. Geological Survey Special Paper 444. U.S. Government Printing Office; 93 pages
- Waters, A. C. (1967). Moon Craters and Oregon Volcanoes. Oregon State System of Higher Education. Bibcode:1967mcov.book.....W; Condon Lectures, 70 pages
- Goodell, Philip C.; Waters, Aaaron C., eds. (1981). Uranium in Volcanic and Volcaniclastic Rocks. AAPG Studies in Geology, volume 13. American Association of Petroleum Engineers. doi:10.1306/St13421. ISBN 978-1-6298-1181-9.
- Waters, Aaron Clement; Donnelly-Nolan, Julie M.; Rogers, Bruce W. (1990). Selected caves and lava-tube systems in and near Lava Beds National Monument, California (PDF). U.S. Geological Survey, Bulletin 1673; 102 pages
