= Konrad Bates Krauskopf =

American geologist (1910-2003)

Konrad Bates Krauskopf (November 30, 1910 – May 4, 2003) was an American geologist, a pioneer in geochemistry, noted for his work in radioactive waste disposal. Krauskopf led expeditions to Mexico, Norway, the Sierra and the Pacific Northwest. Krauskopf was a geology professor at Stanford University, and a member of the National Academy of Sciences.

Krauskopf was born in Madison, Wisconsin and attended East Side High School in Madison. He earned his A.B. in chemistry at the University of Wisconsin–Madison in 1931. He earned his PhD at the University of California, Berkeley in 1934, and joined the faculty at Stanford University in 1939, where he served as professor until 1976, then professor emeritus until his death. He was an elected member of the National Academy of Sciences and American Philosophical Society, served as president of the American Geological Institute (1964), Geological Society of America (1967), and the Geochemical Society (1970). He was the recipient of several awards including the Arthur L. Day Medal, V. M. Goldschmidt Award, American Geosciences Institute Medal in Memory of Ian Campbell, Distinguished Public Service Award of the Mineralogical Society of America and the Legendary Geoscientist Award from the American Geological Institute. He was a member of the Norwegian Academy of Science and Letters from 1971. He died in 2003 at his Stanford home.
