= Adolph Knopf =

American geologist (1882–1966)

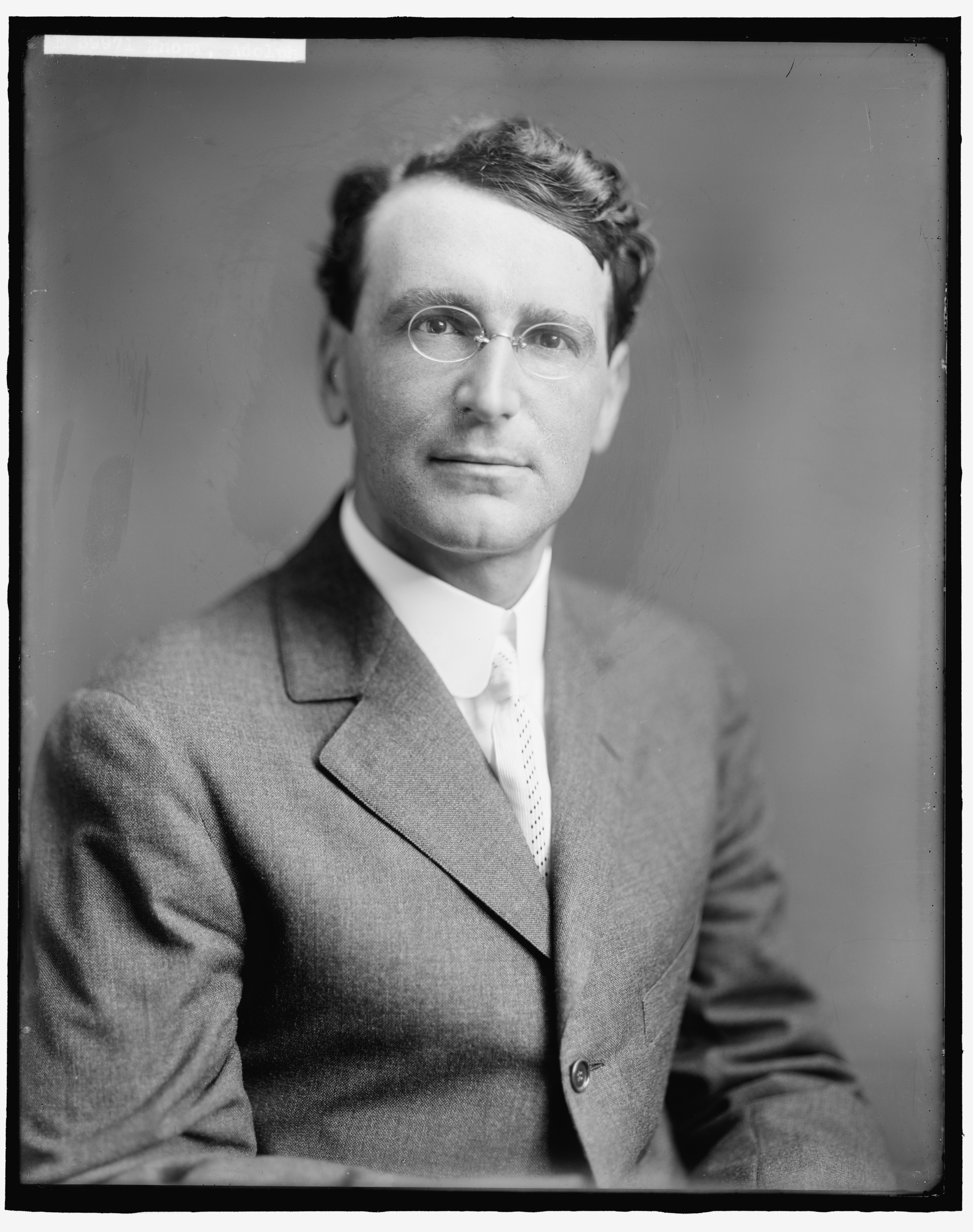
- Born: December 2, 1882; San Francisco, California, United States
- Died: November 23, 1966 (aged 83); Palo Alto, California, United States
- Education: University of California, Berkeley
- Awards: Penrose Medal (1959)
- Scientific career
- Fields: Geology
- Workplaces: United States Geological Survey; Yale University; Stanford University
- Academic advisors: Andrew Lawson
- Doctoral students: Aaron C. Waters

Adolph Knopf (December 2, 1882 – November 23, 1966) was an American geologist. Educated at the University of California, Berkeley, he held professional appointments at the United States Geological Survey, Yale University, and Stanford University. He was primarily a petrologist and mineralogist, though later in his career contributed to geochronology. He performed much of his field work in the western United States, investigating mineral deposits in Alaska, the Boulder Batholith in Montana, and the Gold Country of California.

Knopf was a member of the National Academy of Sciences and the American Academy of Arts and Sciences. He served as president of the Geological Society of America in 1944 and received its Penrose Medal in 1959. His second wife, Eleanora Knopf, was a notable geologist and frequent collaborator.

== Early life ==
Knopf was born December 2, 1882, in San Francisco, California, to German American immigrants. His father was a building contractor. He grew up with his family on a ranch near Woodside, California.

== Career ==
Knopf entered the University of California, Berkeley, where he became a student of petrology under Andrew Lawson. He earned a Bachelor of Science degree in mining geology in 1904 and a Master of Science degree in 1905. That same year he spent the first of six summers surveying the mineral deposits of Alaska for the United States Geological Survey (USGS). In 1906 he moved to Washington, D.C., to work for the USGS full-time. The Alaskan Division, of which Knopf was one of about a dozen members, was considered the best geologic group in the USGS at that time. Knopf's work on tin deposits in the Seward Peninsula became the basis of the dissertation for his Ph.D., which he received from Berkeley in 1909. In Alaska he also discovered the minerals hulsite and paigeite.

In 1911 Knopf was promoted from assistant geologist to geologist. Over the next nine years he undertook a series of field projects for the USGS, beginning with the mining district in Montana that includes the Boulder Batholith and continuing to other western states including Nevada and California. In the latter state he surveyed the Gold Country. After discovering that universities on the eastern seaboard were paying about double the USGS salaries, Knopf left the USGS for a teaching position, and a number of his colleagues followed suit. Knopf began at Yale University in January 1920. He encouraged students to work with the USGS as he had done; this helped mitigate the agency's brain drain following the departures.

Knopf began at Yale as an associate professor but was promoted to full professor in 1923. He was named the Silliman Professor of Geology in 1937 and a Sterling Professor in 1938. He was director of graduate studies from 1933 until his retirement from Yale in 1951. Upon retiring he returned to his native Woodside, California, settling not far from his family's old ranch. There he accepted a visiting appointment at the Stanford University School of Earth Sciences, where he remained until his death in 1966.

Knopf's field work continued through his Yale and Stanford appointments, again with a focus on western states. He continued his work in the Boulder Batholith and investigated intrusive igneous rock bodies in the Spanish Peaks in Colorado. He also contributed to the emerging field of geochronology, putting lower bounds of 2 billion years and later 4.5 billion years on the age of the Earth.

Knopf was elected to the National Academy of Sciences in 1931. He was also a Fellow of the American Academy of Arts and Sciences and of the Geological Society of America. He was president of the Geological Society of America in 1944, and he received the Penrose Medal in 1959. In 1937 he was vice president of the Society of Economic Geologists.

== Personal life ==
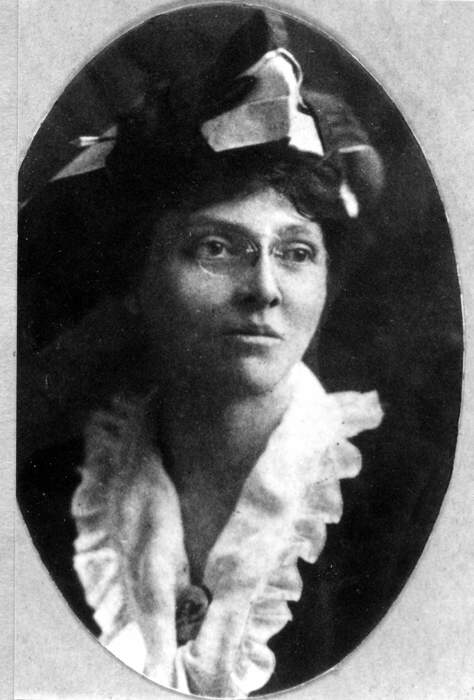
Eleanora Knopf, geologist and second wife of Adolph Knopf.

In 1908 Knopf married Agnes Burchard Dillon. They had three daughters and one son, though one of the daughters died in infancy. Agnes died in 1918 in that year's flu pandemic. In June 1920, Knopf married fellow USGS geologist Eleanora Frances Bliss, who as Eleanora Knopf became a frequent collaborator and travel companion. When Adolph moved to Yale, which did not then hire women, Eleanora worked out of Adolph's office, teaching private classes and still accepting USGS assignments. When they moved to California, Stanford hired her as a research associate.

== Legacy ==
Knopf died November 23, 1966, in Palo Alto, California. In his will he endowed a chaired professorship at Yale. The sitting Adolph Knopf Professor of Petrology is Shun-ichiro Karato. Adolph and Eleanora Knopf also endowed a graduate fellowship in petrology at Stanford. Mount Adolph Knopf in Juneau Borough, Alaska is named after him.
