= Rollin Eckis =

American geologist and oil company executive

Rollin P. Eckis (c. 1905 – November 12, 1999) was an American geologist and oil company executive. He helped discover oil fields in California and Alaska.
