= Emperor Peak =

Mountain in British Columbia, Canada

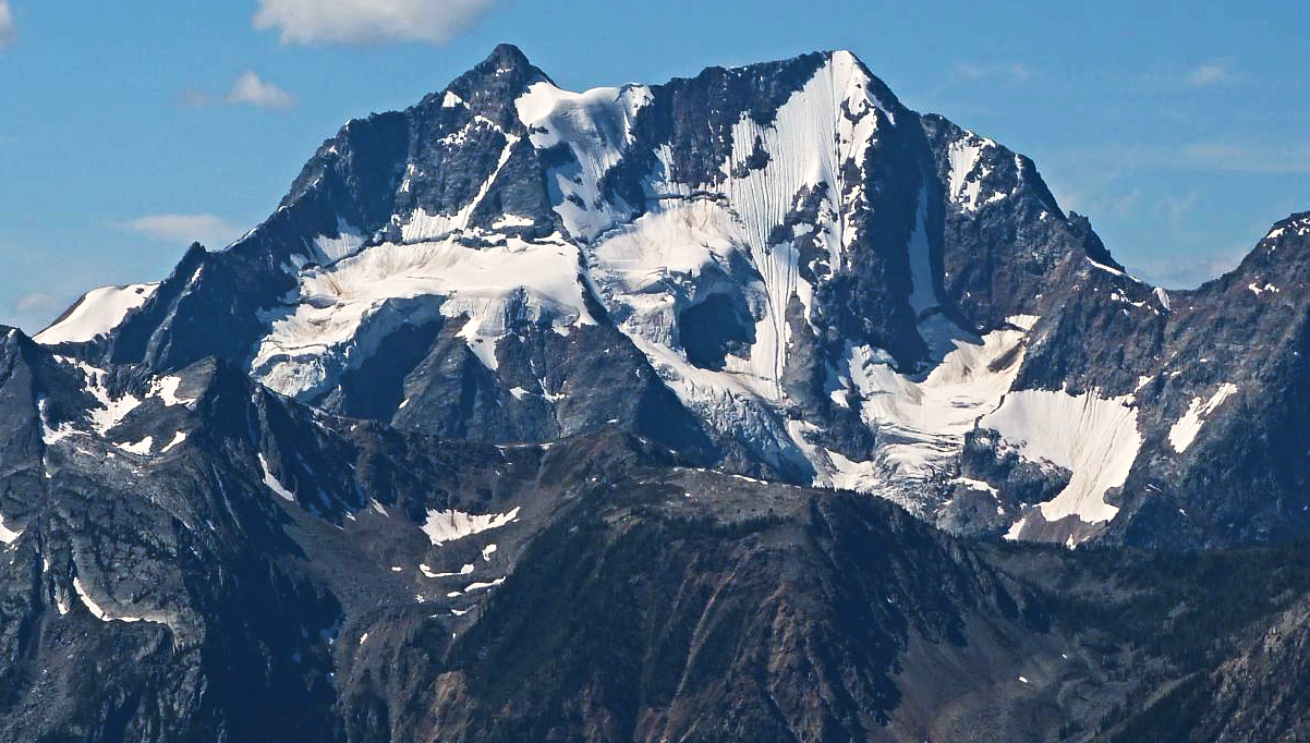
- Emperor-Archduke Massif, northeast aspect Emperor Peak (right)

Highest point
- Elevation: 3,127 m (10,259 ft)
- Prominence: 77 m (253 ft)
- Parent peak: Archduke Mountain (3135 m)
- Listing: Mountains of British Columbia
- Coordinates: 50°17′50″N 116°46′51″W

Geography
- Location within British Columbia Location within Canada
- Location: British Columbia, Canada
- District: Kootenay Land District
- Parent range: Purcell Mountains
- Topo map: NTS 82K7 Duncan Lake

Climbing
- First ascent: 1967

Emperor Peak is a 3,127-metre (10,259-foot) mountain summit located in the Purcell Mountains of British Columbia, Canada. It is situated 43 km (27 mi) north of Kaslo, on the northern boundary of Purcell Wilderness Conservancy Provincial Park and Protected Area. The nearest higher peak is Archduke Mountain, one km (0.62 mi) to the east. These two peaks make up the double summit of the Archduke-Emperor massif. The mountain's name was officially adopted June 20, 1972, when approved by the Geographical Names Board of Canada. The peak was named for its regal appearance, and for Beethoven's Emperor Concerto, as submitted by climber Curt Wagner who had climbed the mountain in 1967.

== Climate ==
Based on the Köppen climate classification, Emperor Peak is located in a subarctic climate zone with cold, snowy winters, and mild summers.Temperatures can drop below −20 °C with wind chill factors below −30 °C. Precipitation runoff from Emperor Peak and meltwater from its glacier drains into tributaries of the Duncan River.

== See also ==
- Geography of British Columbia
