= The Snow Towers =

Mountain in Alaska, U.S.

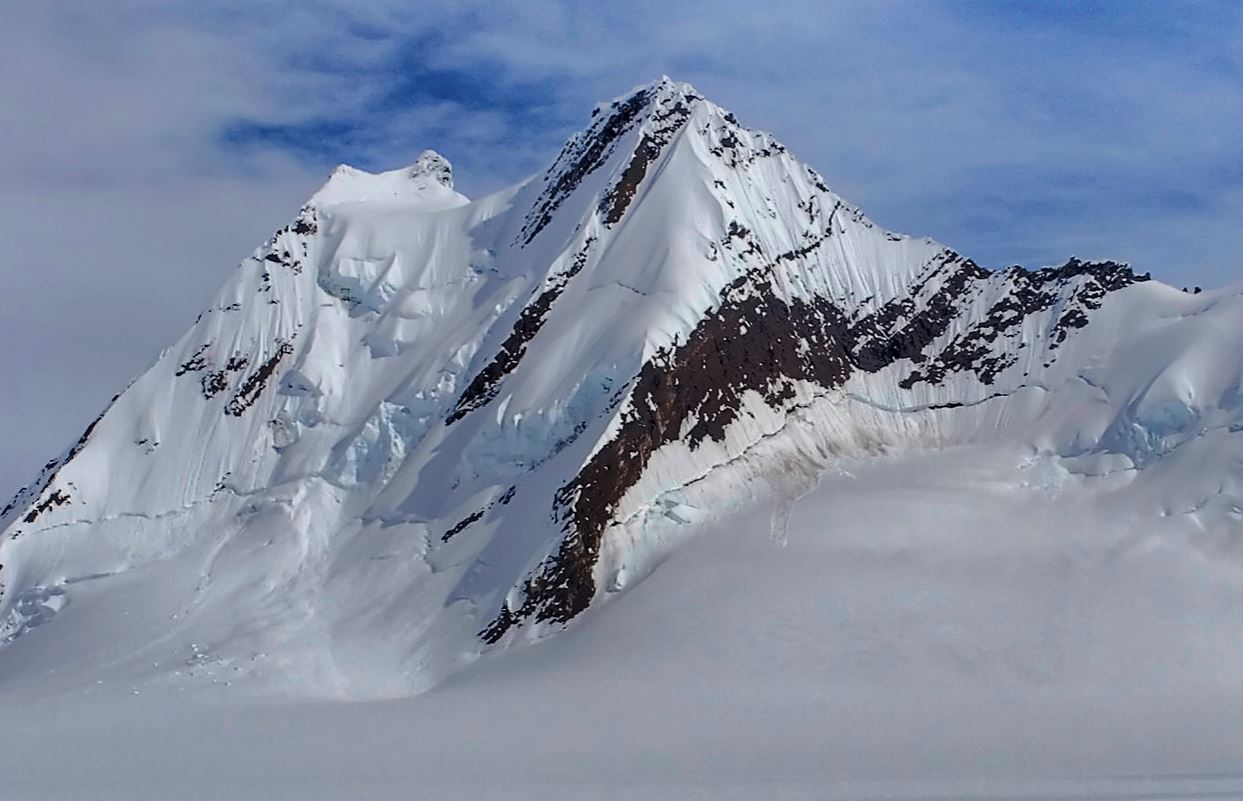
- The Snow Towers, northwest aspect

Highest point
- Elevation: 7,100+ ft (2,160+ m)
- Prominence: 2,600 ft (790 m)
- Parent peak: Blizzard Peak
- Isolation: 16.76 mi (26.97 km)
- Coordinates: 58°37′43″N 134°30′56″W

Geography
- Location within Alaska
- Interactive map of The Snow Towers
- Location: Tongass National Forest; Juneau Borough; Alaska, United States
- Parent range: Coast Mountains; Boundary Ranges; Juneau Icefield
- Topo map: USGS Juneau C-2

Climbing
- First ascent: 1984

The Snow Towers is a 7,100+ ft (2,160+ m) glaciated mountain summit located in the Boundary Ranges of the Coast Mountains, in the U.S. state of Alaska. The two peaks, 0.1 mi apart, are situated at the apex of the Taku and Herbert Glaciers near the western edge of the Juneau Icefield, 23 mi (37 km) north of Juneau, 1.8 mi (3 km) southwest of Snowpatch Crag, and 6.3 mi (10 km) northeast of Mount Ernest Gruening, on land managed by Tongass National Forest. The mountain was named by members of the Juneau Icefield Research Project in 1964, and was officially adopted in 1965 by the U.S. Board on Geographic Names. The first ascent was made in 1984 by Charles "Dick" Ellsworth and Bruce Tickell.

== Climate ==
Based on the Köppen climate classification, The Snow Towers is located in a subpolar oceanic climate zone, with long, cold, wet winters, and cool summers. Most weather fronts originate in the Pacific Ocean, and travel east toward the Coast Mountains where they are forced upward by the range (Orographic lift), causing them to drop their moisture in the form of rain or snowfall. As a result, the Coast Mountains experience high precipitation, especially during the winter months in the form of snowfall. Winter temperatures can drop below −20 °C with wind chill factors below −30 °C. The months May and June offer the most favorable weather for viewing this peak.

== Gallery ==
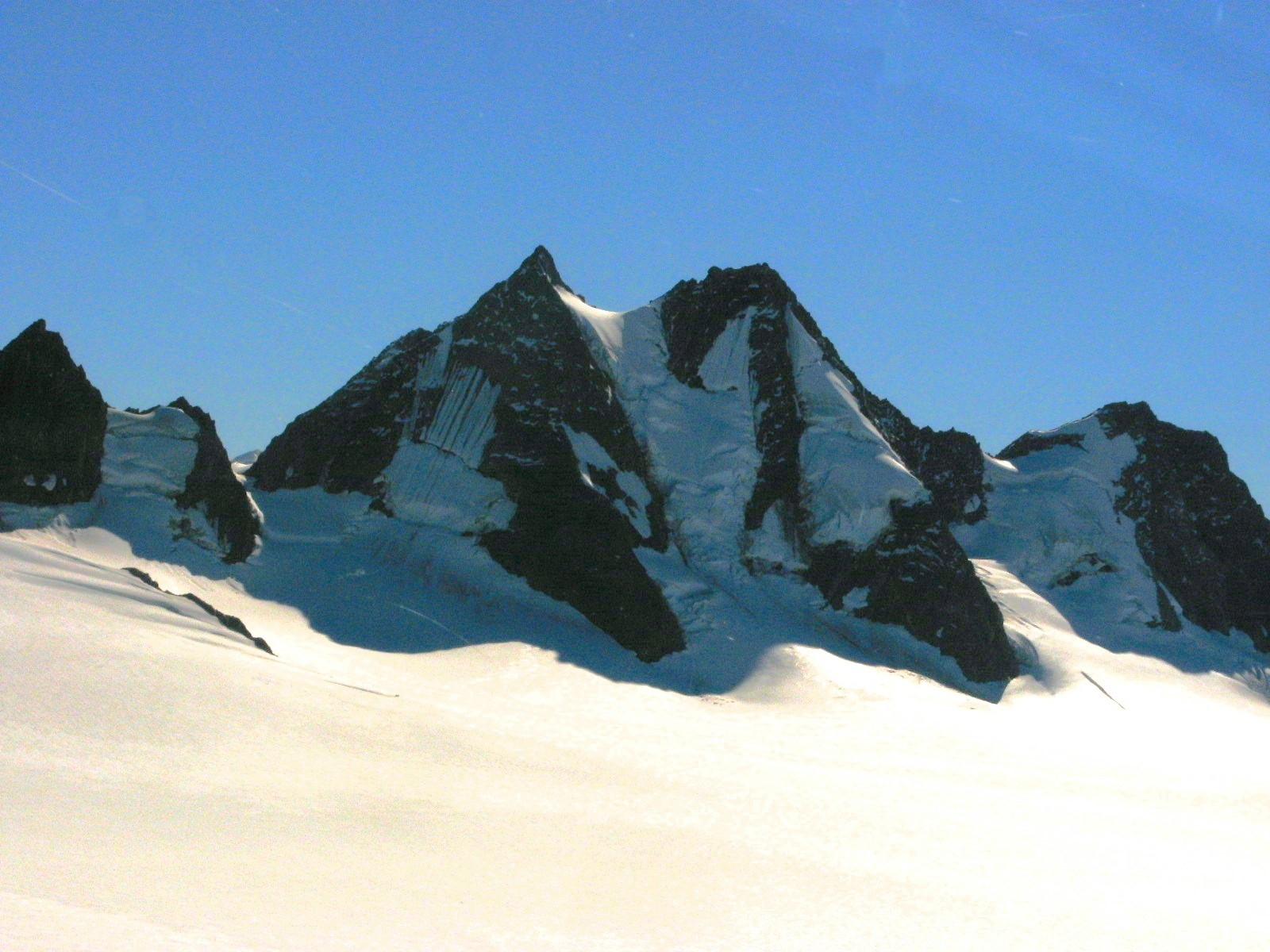
North aspect

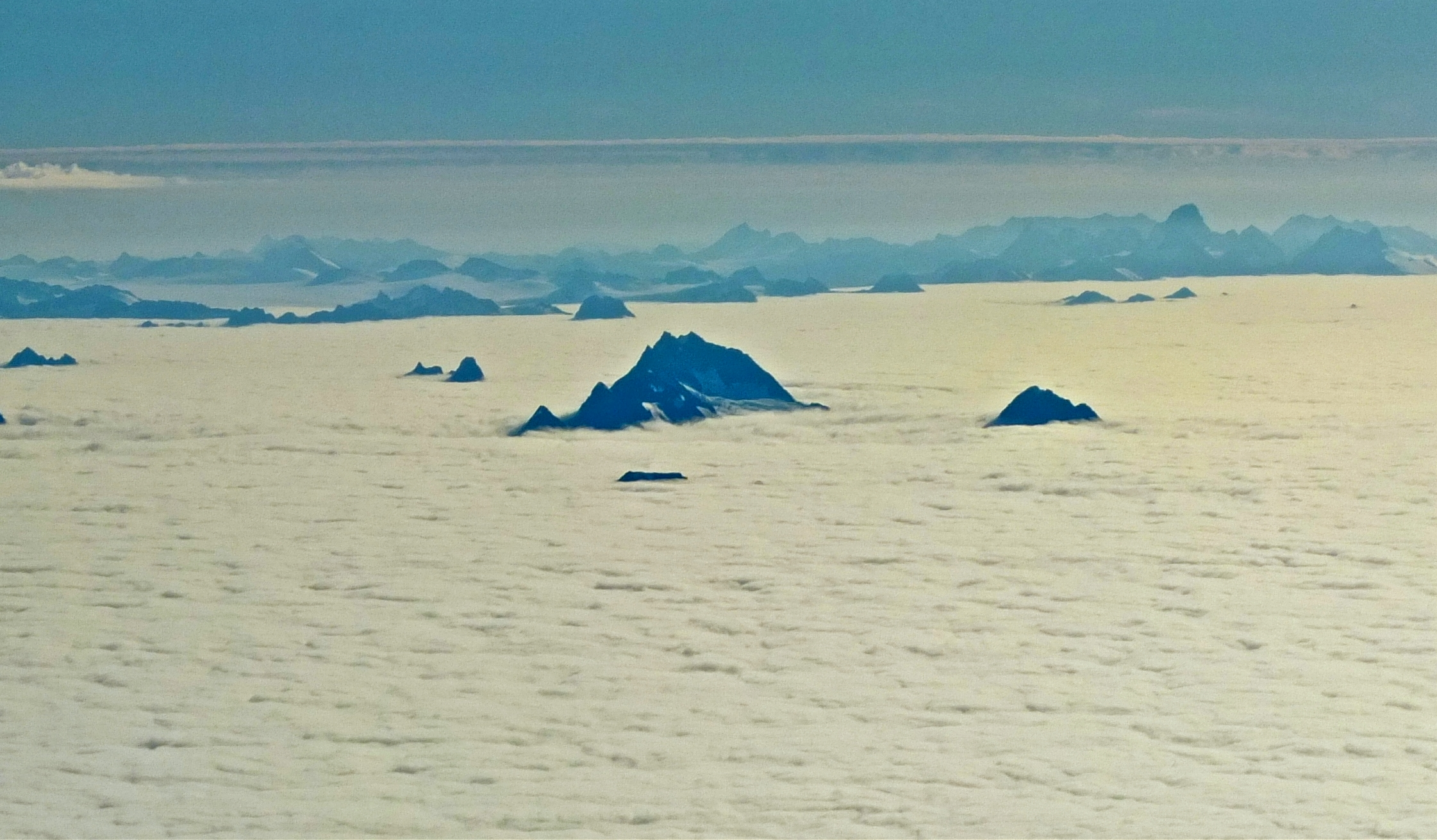
The Snow Towers above clouds

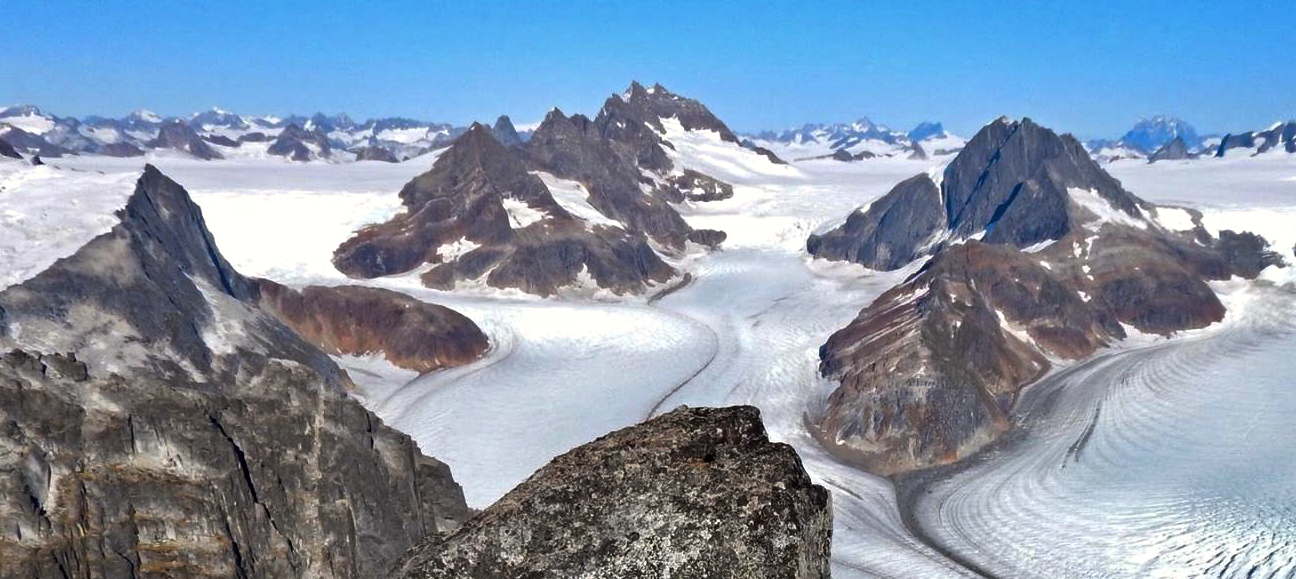
The Snow Towers, southwest aspect, centered at top, seen from Mt. Ernest Gruening

== See also ==
- Geospatial summary of the High Peaks/Summits of the Juneau Icefield
- Geography of Alaska
