= Ice Peak =

Mountain in British Columbia, Canada

- Ice Volcano
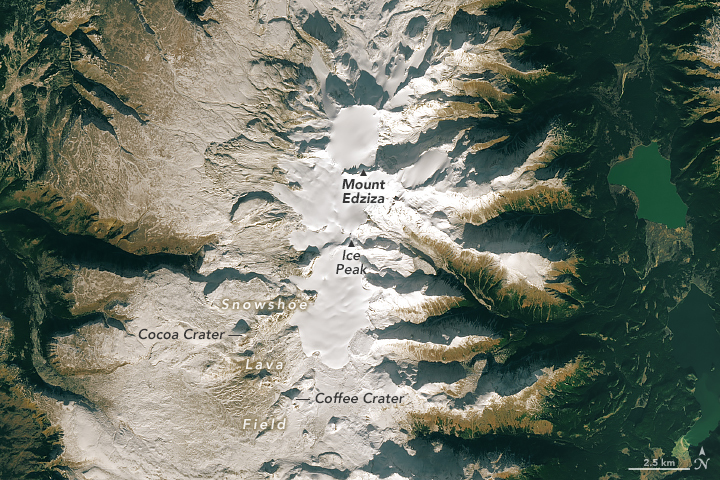
- Satellite image showing the locations of Ice Peak, Mount Edziza and the Snowshoe Lava Field

Highest point
- Elevation: 2,500 m (8,200 ft)
- Coordinates: 57°41′26″N 130°38′08″W

Naming
- Defining authority: BC Geographical Names office in Victoria, British Columbia

Geography
- Location in British Columbia
- Location in Mount Edziza Provincial Park
- Country: Canada
- Province: British Columbia
- District: Cassiar Land District
- Protected area: Mount Edziza Provincial Park
- Topo map: NTS 104G10 Mount Edziza

Geology
- Formed by: Volcanism and erosion
- Rock age: c. 1 Ma to less than 20 ka
- Mountain type: Stratovolcano/pyramidal peak
- Rock type(s): Hawaiite, tristanite, trachybasalt, alkali basalt, benmoreite, trachyte, mugearite
- Volcanic zone: Northern Cordilleran Province
- Last eruption: Holocene age

Ice Peak is the prominent south peak of Mount Edziza in Cassiar Land District of northwestern British Columbia, Canada. It has an elevation of 2,500 metres (8,200 feet) and protrudes through Mount Edziza's ice cap, which is roughly 70 square kilometres (27 square miles) in area. The peak is a pyramid-shaped horn formed by glacial erosion and is completely flanked by steep-walled, active cirques. Tencho Glacier on the southern flank is the largest outlet glacier of Mount Edziza's ice cap. The summit of Ice Peak is about 280 m (920 ft) lower than that of Mount Edziza, but it still rises well above the general level of the Big Raven Plateau. Ice Peak and the surrounding area are in Mount Edziza Provincial Park, which also includes the Spectrum Range to the south.

Ice Peak is the remains of an approximately one-million-year-old stratovolcano whose original eastern flank has been almost completely destroyed by erosion. Four cirques on the eroded eastern flank have exposed the internal structure of the stratovolcano whereas the southern and western flanks are approximal to those of the original volcano. The northern flank is buried under the younger and higher stratovolcano of Mount Edziza which reaches an elevation of 2,786 m (9,140 ft). On the southwestern flank is the Snowshoe Lava Field, which issued from at least 12 vents mostly near the terminus of outlet glaciers in the last 20,000 years. A diverse assemblage of volcanic rocks forms the Ice Peak stratovolcano and are subdivided into three geological formations with varying ages.

== Geography and geomorphology ==
=== Location ===
Ice Peak lies in Mount Edziza Provincial Park southeast of the community of Telegraph Creek. With an area of 2,661.8 km^{2} (1,027.7 mi^{2}), Mount Edziza Provincial Park is one of the largest provincial parks in British Columbia and was established in 1972 to preserve the volcanic landscape. It includes not only the Mount Edziza area but also the Spectrum Range to the south, which are separated by Raspberry Pass. Mount Edziza Provincial Park is in the Tahltan Highland, a southeast-trending upland area extending along the western side of the Stikine Plateau.

=== Structure ===
Ice Peak is the prominent south peak of Mount Edziza, an ice-covered stratovolcano in Cassiar Land District of northwestern British Columbia, Canada. It is a pyramid-shaped horn formed by glacial erosion and represents the western rim of a small caldera which formed on the summit of an older stratovolcano. This stratovolcano is one of four felsic central volcanoes along the north–south axis of the Mount Edziza volcanic complex, the other three being Armadillo Peak, the Spectrum Range and the 2,786 m (9,140 ft) high edifice of Mount Edziza. The current, 2,500 m (8,200 ft) high horn of Ice Peak protrudes through the roughly 70-square-kilometre (27-square-mile) ice cap of Mount Edziza and is completely flanked by steep-walled, active cirques. Tencho Glacier on the southern flank of Ice Peak is the largest outlet glacier of the ice cap, as well as the largest glacier of the Mount Edziza volcanic complex. Idiji Glacier occupies a cirque on the eastern flank of Ice Peak whereas Tennaya Glacier extends southeast from between Ice Peak and the summit of Mount Edziza.

Four cirques on the eastern flank have exposed the internal structure of the Ice Peak stratovolcano whereas the western flank is completely mantled by glaciers. The eastern cirques are at the head of Tennaya Creek which flows northeast into Nuttlude Lake, an expansion of Kakiddi Creek. Between the Tennaya, Nido and Tenchen creeks are pie-shaped, gently sloping interfluves which represent the remains of the original eastern flank of the Ice Peak stratovolcano. Although the original eastern flank has been almost completely destroyed by erosion, the northern flank is buried under the younger stratovolcano of Mount Edziza. The southern and western flanks of the Ice Peak stratovolcano are approximal to those of the original volcano and merge with the Big Raven Plateau, which is one of the main physiographic features of the Mount Edziza volcanic complex.

=== Subfeatures ===
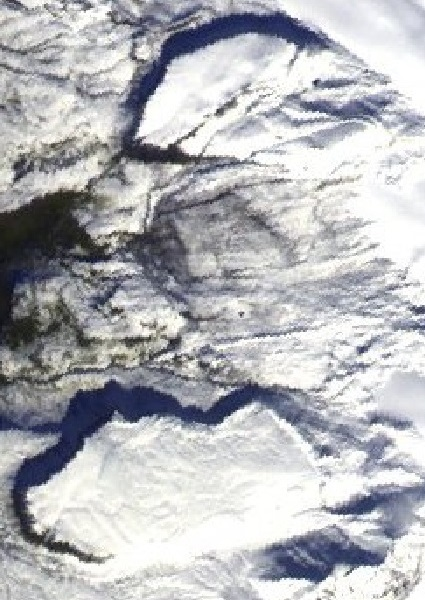
The Ornostay and Koosick bluffs on the western flank of Ice Peak

On the southwestern flank of Ice Peak is a roughly 40-square-kilometre (15-square-mile) area of lava flows and at least 12 vents called the Snowshoe Lava Field. Most of the vents in this lava field are at elevations above 1,800 m (5,900 ft) near the terminus of outlet glaciers of the Mount Edziza ice cap, five of which named. The highest of these vents, Tennena Cone, attains an elevation of 2,390 m (7,840 ft) on the upper western flank of Ice Peak. Cocoa Crater to the southwest has an elevation of 2,117 m (6,946 ft), making it the second highest of the five named vents. The third highest vent, Coffee Crater, is 2,000 m (6,600 ft) in elevation and lies northwest of Cocoa Crater. South of Coffee Crater on the south side of upper Taweh Creek is Keda Cone, the fourth highest vent with an elevation of 1,980 m (6,500 ft). Between the heads of Taweh and Shaman creeks is The Saucer which, with an elevation of 1,920 m (6,300 ft), is the lowest named vent in the Snowshoe Lava Field.

Icefall Cone and Ridge Cone are two parasitic cones on the eastern rim of Ice Peak at an elevation of about 2,285 m (7,497 ft). Both cones are younger than the main edifice of Ice Peak, but they have been greatly modified by glaciation, slumping and rockfalls due to their location near the steep headwalls of active cirques. Punch Cone on the western flank of Ice Peak is a roughly 1-kilometre-long (0.62-mile), steep-sided ridge protruding through Mount Edziza's ice cap. It is elliptical in structure and older than the Icefall and Ridge cones, although it is also younger than the main edifice of Ice Peak. Also on the western flank of Ice Peak where it merges with the surrounding Big Raven Plateau are the Koosick and Ornostay bluffs, which lie adjacent to the head of Sezill Creek. The Neck is a circular, 300 m (980 ft) in diameter volcanic plug on the southeastern flank with an elevation of 1,830 m (6,000 ft).

== Geology ==
=== Background ===
Ice Peak is part of the Northern Cordilleran Volcanic Province, a broad area of shield volcanoes, lava domes, cinder cones and stratovolcanoes extending from northwestern British Columbia northwards through Yukon into easternmost Alaska. The dominant rocks that make up these volcanoes are alkali basalts and hawaiites, but nephelinites, basanites and peralkaline phonolites, trachytes and comendites are locally abundant. These rocks were deposited by volcanic eruptions from 20 million years ago to as recently as a few hundred years ago. Volcanism in the Northern Cordilleran Volcanic Province is thought to be due to rifting of the North American Cordillera, driven by changes in relative plate motion between the North American and Pacific plates.

=== Stratigraphy ===
Ice Peak is subdivided into at least three geological formations, each being the product of a distinct stage of volcanic activity. These periods of volcanic activity occurred during three magmatic cycles of the Mount Edziza volcanic complex; each cycle began with the effusion of alkali basalt and culminated with the eruption of lesser volumes of felsic magma. The oldest geological formation is the Ice Peak Formation, which formed during a period of volcanic activity about one million years ago during the third magmatic cycle. Another period of volcanic activity 0.3 million years ago deposited the Kakiddi Formation on the southwestern and eastern parts of the Ice Peak pile during the fourth magmatic cycle. The third oldest geological formation is the Big Raven Formation, which was deposited on the Ice Peak and Kakiddi formations during the fifth magmatic cycle in the last 20,000 years.

==== Ice Peak Formation ====
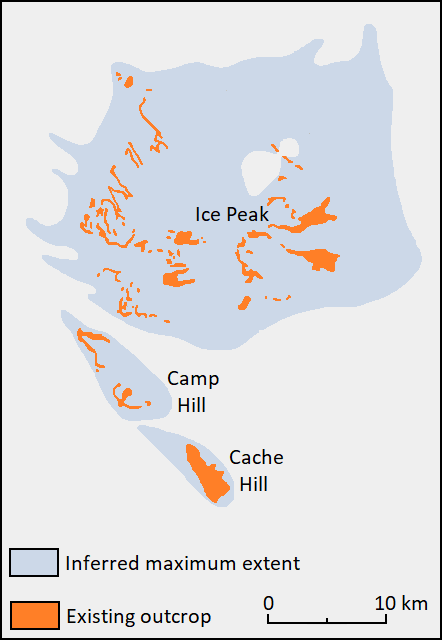
Paleogeological map of the Ice Peak Formation at the end of the Ice Peak eruptive period

The Ice Peak Formation consists of lava and pyroclastic rocks that were erupted mainly from vents near the summit of the Ice Peak stratovolcano. Two stratigraphic units form this once symmetrical stratovolcano, both of which are lithologically distinct. The lower stratigraphic unit, which forms much of the volcanic pile, is an assemblage of mostly thin basaltic lava flows. Lavas of intermediate composition such as tristanite, trachybasalt and mugearite are very limited in extent. The upper stratigraphic unit is a highly varied succession of lavas and pyroclastic rocks forming the high, central edifice of Ice Peak. It consists of basalt, trachyte and a variety of intermediate rocks such as tristanite, trachybasalt, benmoreite and mugearite.

The Ice Peak Formation includes the Koosick and Ornostay bluffs, both of which are thick lobes of trachyte that originated under the summit ice cap. Both bluffs are similar in geomorphology and composition, consisting of several lava flows up to 75 m (246 ft) thick. The Neck, which forms a prominent 215 m (705 ft) high buttress on Sorcery Ridge, is also part of the Ice Peak Formation. Potassium–argon dating of Ice Peak Formation pantelleritic trachyte has yielded ages of 1.6 ± 0.2 million years, 1.5 ± 0.4 million years and 1.5 ± 0.1 million years. These dates being older than those of the underlying Pyramid Formation may be due to excess argon in the Ice Peak Formation; therefore the dates are considered unreliable.

Ice Peak Formation basalt flows on the northwestern flank of Mount Edziza are interbedded with diamictites recording a regional glaciation that occurred during the Early Pleistocene. The lowermost basalt flow contains pillows at its base, directly overlies hyaloclastites and is brecciated and deformed, suggesting that it may have been extruded onto a glacier or an ice sheet. Its extrusion onto glacial ice is also evident due to the lack of fluvial and lacustrine sediments at the base of the basalt flow, which suggests that it did not extrude into lakes or streams. The steep sides and unusually large thicknesses of the trachyte lava flows forming Koosick and Ornostay bluffs is attributed to them having been extruded through glacial ice.

==== Kakiddi Formation ====
The Kakiddi Formation consists of the remains of thick trachyte lava flows and associated pyroclastic rocks. They are lithologically and geomorphologically similar to the older Edziza Formation trachytes, but occur south of the central stratovolcano of Mount Edziza. The remains of a nearly 1 km (0.62 mi) wide, rubble-covered trachyte flow are present on the eastern flank of Ice Peak in Sorcery Valley and in the south fork of Tennaya Valley where it is divided into two tributary branches. In Kakiddi Valley, the lava flow appears to have spread out to form a once continuous, terminal lobe at least 5 km (3.1 mi) wide. Remnants of this terminal lobe are present in the form of isolated outcrops adjacent to the Kakiddi and Nuttlude lakes. The source of this Kakiddi flow remains unknown, but the tributary branch that descended Tennaya Valley probably originated from a vent near the summit of Ice Peak that is now covered by glaciers. A relatively small trachyte flow descended from Punch Cone on the western flank of Ice Peak and spread onto the Big Raven Plateau. Potassium–argon dating of the Kakiddi Formation has yielded ages of 0.31 ± 0.07 million years from mugearite, as well as 0.30 ± 0.02 million years, 0.29 ± 0.02 million years and 0.28 ± 0.02 million years from trachyte.

==== Big Raven Formation ====
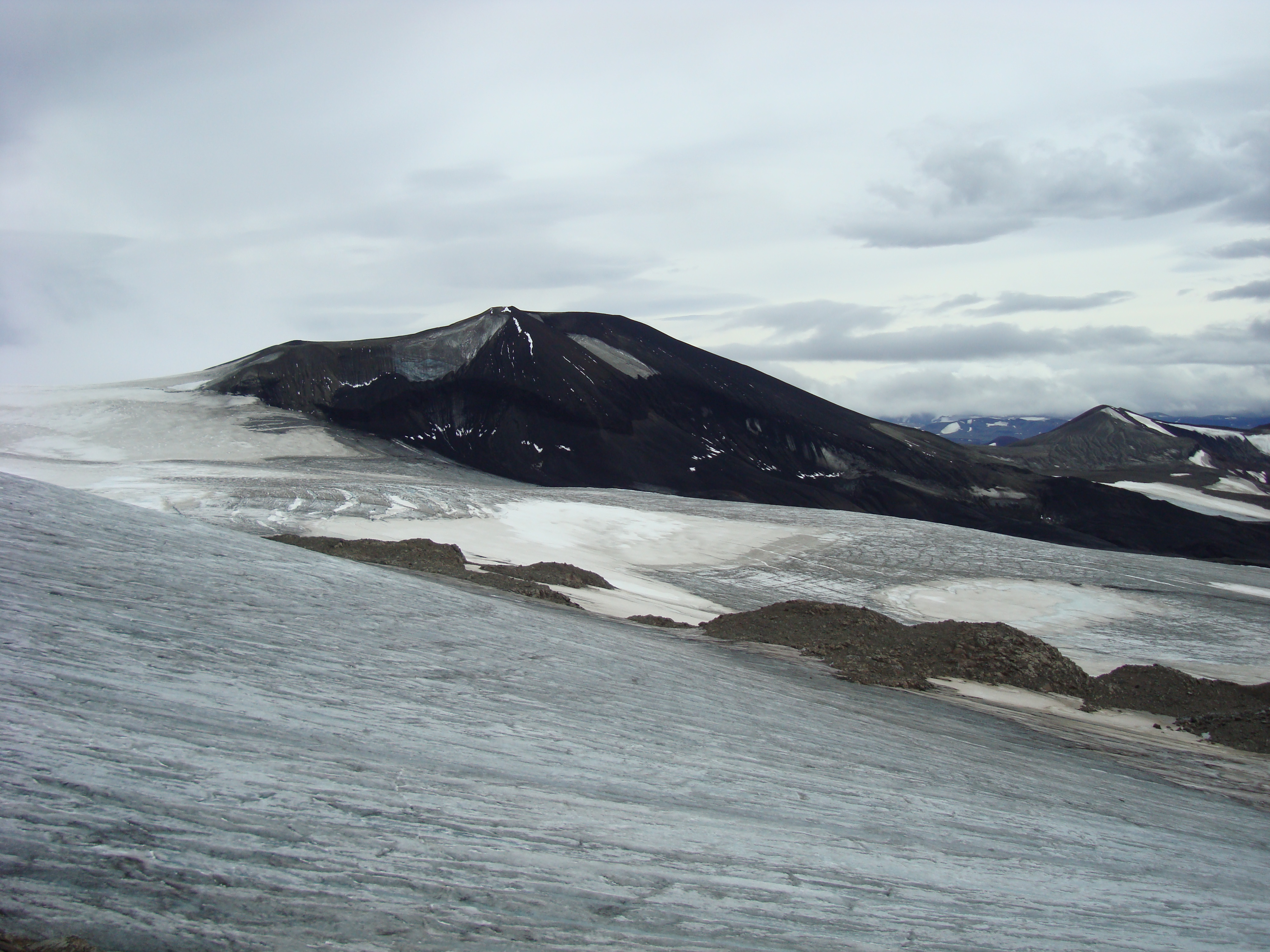
Tennena Cone on the upper western flank of Ice Peak

The Big Raven Formation includes the Icefall and Ridge cones, as well as the Snowshoe Lava Field and the Sheep Track Member. All of these features consist of alkali basalt and hawaiite with the exception of the Sheep Track Member which consists of a small volume of trachyte pumice. Early volcanism in the Snowshoe Lava Field deposited material that was quenched by ice and meltwater, resulting in piles of tuff breccia, pillow lava and pillow breccia such as Tennena Cone. Cinder cones such as the Cocoa and Coffee craters were created by subsequent lava fountain eruptions in a subaerial environment. The Saucer was formed by a later subaerial fissure eruption that was not accompanied by lava fountaining. Instead, lava issued quietly and flowed into Shaman Creek in the east and Taweh Creek in the west.

The Sheep Track Member is the product of a small but violent VEI-3 eruption from the southwestern flank of Ice Peak. It was deposited on all lava flows and cinder cones in the Snowshoe Lava Field with the exception of The Saucer, which likely postdates the Sheep Track eruption. The source of the Sheep Track pumice is unknown, but it probably originated from a vent hidden under Tencho Glacier. Argon–argon dating indicates that the pumice was deposited by an explosive eruption sometime in the last 7,000 years, most likely around 950 CE.

=== Basement ===
Ice Peak is underlain by the Pyramid Formation, which consists mainly of Pleistocene rhyolite and trachyte lava flows, domes and thick piles of pyroclastic breccia. Also underlying Ice Peak are alkali basalt lava flows and flow breccia of the Tenchen Member of the Nido Formation, which were erupted from multiple older volcanoes during the Pliocene. The southern edge of the Ice Peak pile laps out against Miocene comenditic or trachytic pumice and ash flows of the Armadillo Formation. The oldest geological formation underlying Ice Peak is the Raspberry Formation, which consists of Miocene alkali basalt and minor hawaiite and mugearite. These volcanic rocks are in the form of lava flows, flow breccia and agglutinate, although pillow lava and tuff breccia occur locally. Underlying the Raspberry Formation are sedimentary, volcanic or metamorphic rocks of the Stikinia terrane, which are Paleozoic and Mesozoic in age.

== Name and etymology ==
The name of the peak became official on January 2, 1980, and was adopted on the National Topographic System map 104G after being submitted to the BC Geographical Names office by the Geological Survey of Canada. Several other features on or near the flanks of Ice Peak have names that were also adopted on January 2, 1980, including Keda Cone, Koosick Bluff, Tennena Cone and Ornostay Bluff. Ice Peak is tautological with Ice Mountain, another name for Mount Edziza referring to its cover of glacial ice. The Ice Peak stratovolcano is sometimes referred to as Ice Volcano.

== See also ==
- List of volcanoes in Canada
- List of Northern Cordilleran volcanoes
- Volcanism of Western Canada
