= Tennena Cone =

Volcanic cone in British Columbia, Canada

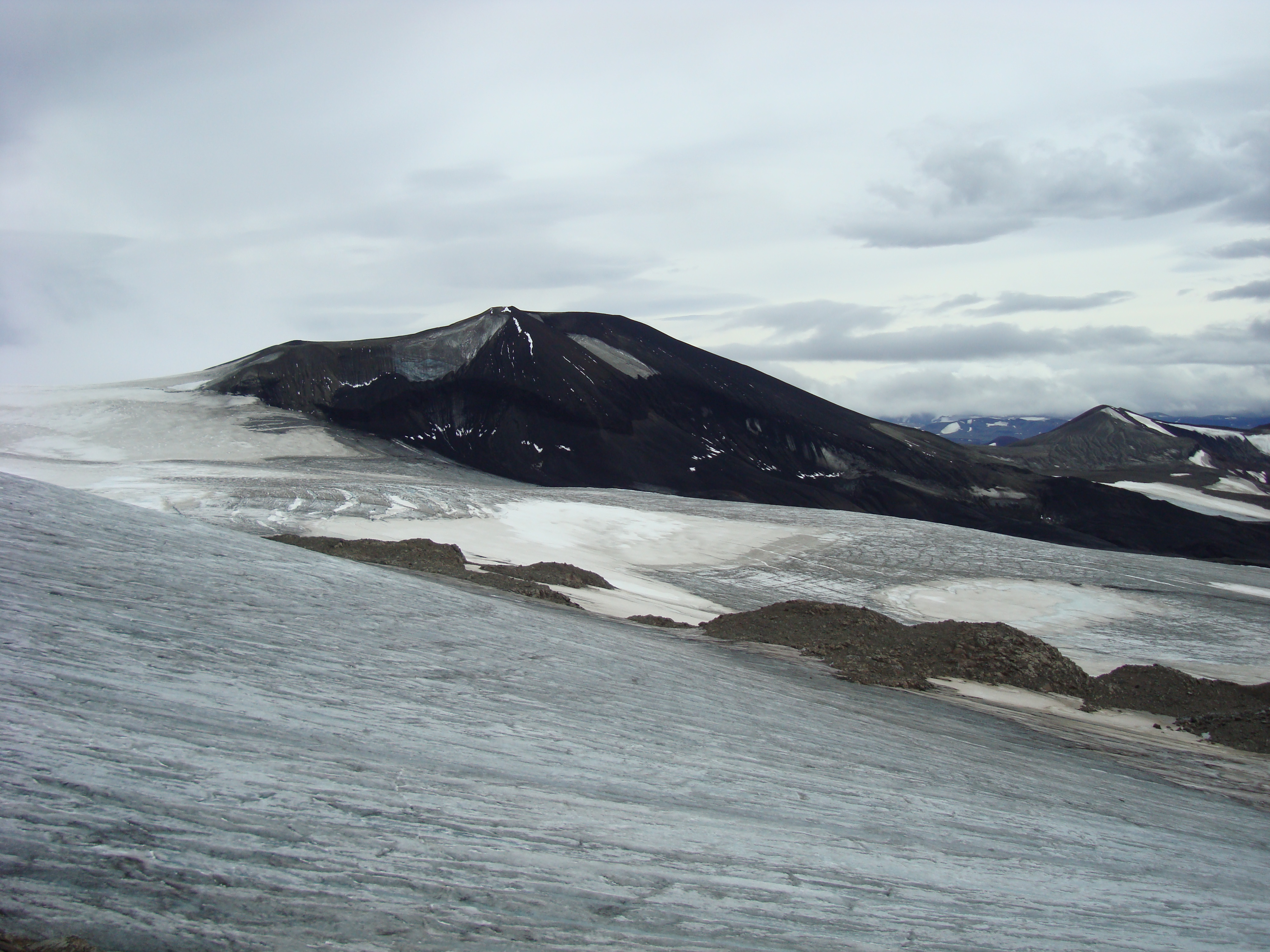
- Tennena Cone from the northwest

Highest point
- Elevation: 2,390 m (7,840 ft)
- Coordinates: 57°41′03″N 130°39′44″W

Dimensions
- Length: 1,200 m (3,900 ft)
- Width: 600 m (2,000 ft)

Naming
- Etymology: Combination of the Tahltan words ten and nena
- English translation: 'Icebridge'

Geography
- Location in British Columbia
- Location in Mount Edziza Provincial Park
- Country: Canada
- Province: British Columbia
- District: Cassiar Land District
- Protected area: Mount Edziza Provincial Park
- Topo map: NTS 104G10 Mount Edziza

Geology
- Formed by: Volcanism
- Mountain type: Subglacial mound
- Rock type: Alkali basalt
- Volcanic zone: Northern Cordilleran Province
- Volcanic field: Snowshoe Lava Field
- Last eruption: Pleistocene or Holocene age

Tennena Cone, alternatively Icebridge Cone, is a small volcanic cone in Cassiar Land District of northwestern British Columbia, Canada. It has an elevation of 2,390 metres (7,840 feet) and lies on the upper western flank of Ice Peak, the prominent south peak of Mount Edziza. The cone is almost completely surrounded by Mount Edziza's ice cap and is one of several volcanoes in the Snowshoe Lava Field on the Big Raven Plateau. Tennena Cone is 200 m (660 ft) high, 1,200 m (3,900 ft) long and up to 600 m (2,000 ft) wide; its symmetrical structure resembles a black pyramid. The cone and the surrounding area are in Mount Edziza Provincial Park, which also includes the Spectrum Range to the south.

Tennena Cone is part of the Mount Edziza volcanic complex, a group of overlapping volcanoes that have formed over the last 7.5 million years. It overlies four geological formations of this volcanic complex that formed during the Miocene, Pliocene and Pleistocene epochs, all of which consist of several types of volcanic rocks. Tennena Cone consists of pillow lavas, tuff breccias and lapilli tuffs of the younger Big Raven Formation, which were deposited by a small eruption under glacial ice. The exact timing of this eruption is unknown, but radiometric dating of alkali basaltic pillow lavas from Tennena Cone suggests that it occurred sometime in the last 33,000 years.

== Name and etymology ==
Tennena Cone was officially named on January 2, 1980. Its name was adopted on the National Topographic System map 104G after being submitted to the BC Geographical Names office by the Geological Survey of Canada. It was required for geology reporting purposes since Jack Souther, a volcanologist of the Geological Survey of Canada, was studying the area in detail between 1970 and 1992.

Tennena is a combination of the Tahltan words ten and nena, which mean 'ice' and 'bridge', respectively. Tennena Cone was given its name because it is almost completely surrounded by glacial ice in an alpine environment. In his 1992 report The Late Cenozoic Mount Edziza Volcanic Complex, British Columbia, Jack Souther gave Tennena Cone the numeronym SLF-1, SLF being an acronym for the Snowshoe Lava Field. Tennena Cone and the associated volcanic rocks have collectively been called the Tennena volcanic centre.

== Geography ==
Tennena Cone is located in Cassiar Land District of northwestern British Columbia, Canada, and resembles a symmetrical, 200 m (660 ft) high, 1,200 m (3,900 ft) long and up to 600 m (2,000 ft) wide black pyramid. Its northern, eastern and southern flanks are mantled by the roughly 70-square-kilometre (27-square-mile) Mount Edziza ice cap and rise about 150 m (490 ft) above the ice surface. Tennena Cone lies at the northern end of Tencho Glacier and reaches an elevation of 2,390 m (7,840 ft) on the upper western flank of Ice Peak, the prominent south peak of Mount Edziza.

At lower elevations, Tennena Cone is surrounded by Ornostay Bluff in the northwest and by Koosick Bluff in the southwest. Between these two bluffs is the head of Sezill Creek which flows northwest from the surrounding Big Raven Plateau and then drains into Taweh Creek, a tributary of Mess Creek. The Big Raven Plateau is a major physiographic feature of the Mount Edziza volcanic complex, which consists of a group of overlapping shield volcanoes, stratovolcanoes, lava domes and cinder cones that have formed over the last 7.5 million years. At the southern end of the Big Raven Plateau is the Snowshoe Lava Field, of which Tennena Cone is a part.

Tennena Cone lies in Mount Edziza Provincial Park southeast of the community of Telegraph Creek. With an area of 2,661.8 km^{2} (1,027.7 mi^{2}), Mount Edziza Provincial Park is one of the largest provincial parks in British Columbia and was established in 1972 to preserve the volcanic landscape. It includes not only the Mount Edziza area but also the Spectrum Range to the south, which are separated by Raspberry Pass. Mount Edziza Provincial Park is in the Tahltan Highland, a southeast-trending upland area extending along the western side of the Stikine Plateau.

== Geology ==
=== Background ===
Tennena Cone is part of the Northern Cordilleran Volcanic Province, a broad area of volcanoes and lava flows extending from northwestern British Columbia northwards through Yukon into easternmost Alaska. The dominant rocks that make up these volcanoes are alkali basalts and hawaiites, but nephelinites, basanites and peralkaline (Note: Peralkaline rocks are magmatic rocks that have a higher ratio of sodium and potassium to aluminum.) phonolites, trachytes and comendites are locally abundant. These rocks were deposited by volcanic eruptions from 20 million years ago to as recently as a few hundred years ago. Volcanism in the Northern Cordilleran Volcanic Province is thought to be due to rifting of the North American Cordillera, driven by changes in relative plate motion between the North American and Pacific plates.

=== Lithology ===
Tennena Cone consists mainly of Big Raven Formation alkali basalt that can be mapped into four subdivisions, all of which are exposed on the eastern, southern and western flanks of the cone. The first subdivision is crudely bedded massive tuff breccia exposed in near-vertical cliffs on the flanks of Tennena Cone. Exposed in scarps on the eastern and southern flanks of Tennena Cone is lapilli tuff of the second subdivision which forms 10-to-30-centimetre-thick (3.9-to-11.8-inch) beds. Two 1 m (3.3 ft) wide dikes (Note: A dike is a sheet-shaped intrusion of magma into pre-existing rock.) form the third subdivision, both of which consist of fragmented plagioclase-phyric rock. The first dike forms a 5 m (16 ft) high remnant and is exposed on the eastern flank of Tennena Cone whereas the second dike is exposed 50 m (160 ft) to the south. In addition to occurring on the eastern flank, the second dike is also exposed on the western flank and along the summit ridge of Tennena Cone. The fourth subdivision consists of pillow and fluidal lavas that overlie tuff breccia in the northern section of the cone.

At the southwestern base of Tennena Cone are elongated mounds of pillow lava that cover about 0.45 square kilometres (0.17 square miles) of hummocky topography. They have a maximum basal diameter of 75 m (246 ft) and range from 3 to 20 m (9.8 to 65.6 ft) high, decreasing in height to the southwest. The orientation of these mounds suggest that they were formed by a fissure eruption. Just west of these pillow lava mounds are massive non-pillowed lava flows which are exposed over an area of around 0.4 square kilometres (0.15 square miles) across gently sloping terrain. Extending west of Tennena Cone north of the pillow lava mounds and massive non-pillowed lava flows is a 4.4-kilometre-long (2.7-mile) pillowed lava flow that terminates at the head of Sezill Creek valley. It contains pillows that range from less than to more than 1 m (3.3 ft) in diameter, as well as vertically oriented pillow-like lava bodies.

Pumice of the Sheep Track Member is present on Tennena Cone and other volcanoes in the Snowshoe Lava Field. This is tephra, deposited via pyroclastic fall by a small but violent VEI-3 eruption from the southwestern flank of Ice Peak in the last 7,000 years, most likely around 950 CE. Sheep Track pumice is lithologically distinct from the rest of the Big Raven Formation, consisting mainly of comenditic trachyte rather than alkali basalt or hawaiite. The source of the pumice is unknown, but it probably originated from a vent under Tencho Glacier, the largest glacier of the Mount Edziza volcanic complex.

=== Formation ===
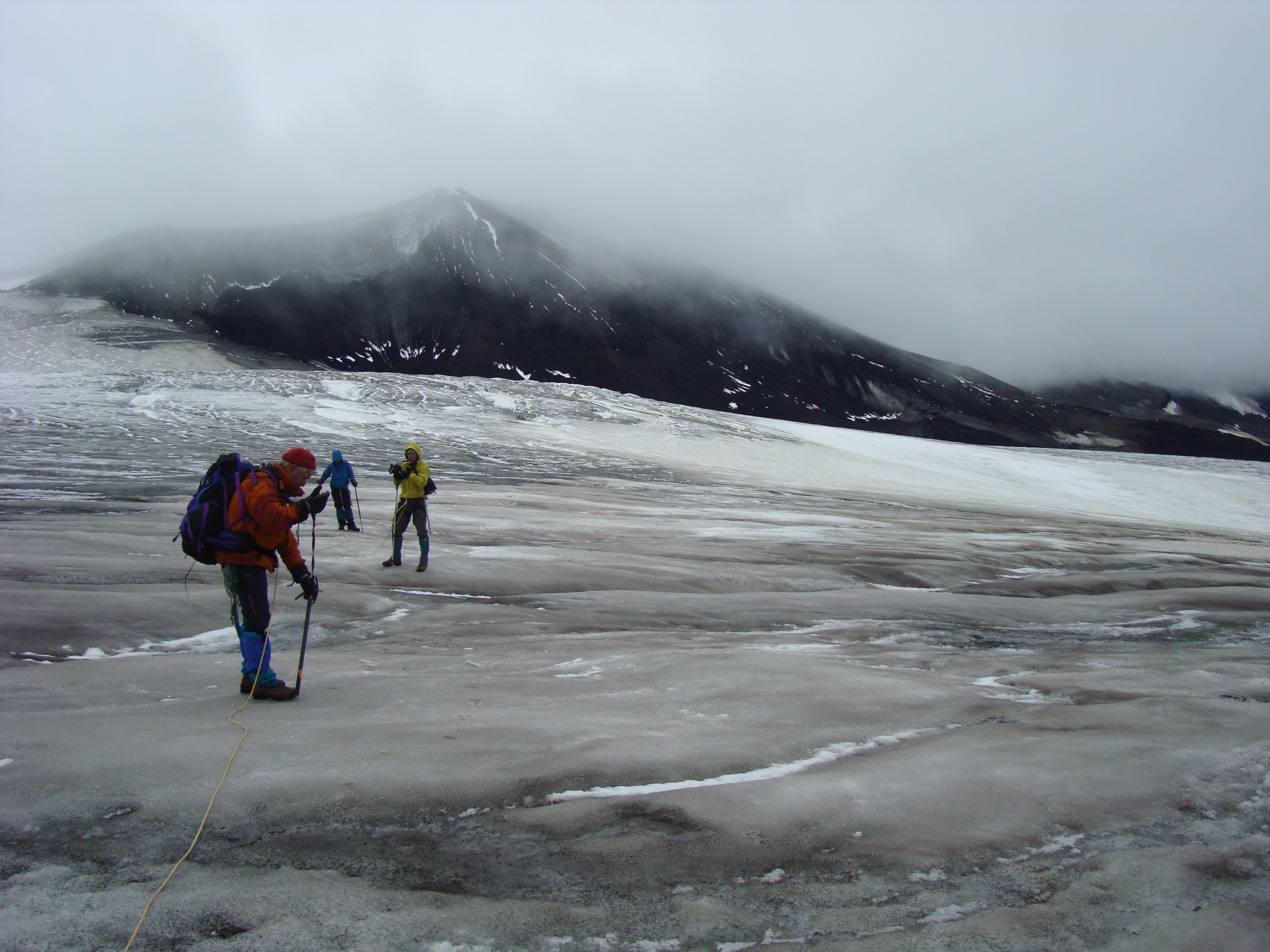
Glacier of Mount Edziza with the summit of Tennena Cone obscured by clouds in the background

Tennena Cone was one of the first volcanoes to erupt during the fifth magmatic cycle of the Mount Edziza volcanic complex. Its formation began when basaltic magma issued from a vent under 500–1,400 m (1,600–4,600 ft) of glacial ice where it was quenched to create the pillow lavas, tuff breccias and lapilli tuffs composing Tennena Cone. This volcanic material accumulated inside a depression melted in the ice but did not breach the ice surface, resulting in the formation of a subglacial mound. Lava flows from Tennena Cone travelled west through tunnels created by eruption-generated meltwater escaping at the base of the enclosing ice.

The longest lava flow at the head of Sezill Creek valley 4.3 km (2.7 mi) west of Tennena Cone travelled to the western edge of the enclosing ice, causing a violent steam explosion. This explosive interaction between meltwater and lava spilled over the terminal moraine and spread onto the Big Raven Plateau beyond the ice. Although the lava flow was quenched by meltwater throughout its entire length, it has a thickness of 2–4 m (6.6–13.1 ft) and travelled into small depressions of the current topography. This suggests that the lava flow was relatively fluid at the time of eruption, resulting in higher mobility.

The exact age of Tennena Cone is unknown, but it may have formed during the Last Glacial Maximum between 23,000 and 18,000 years ago when the Mount Edziza volcanic complex was covered by the Cordilleran Ice Sheet. Another possibility is the cone formed under an expansion of the Mount Edziza ice cap during the Younger Dryas between 12,900 and 11,600 years ago or during a more recent glacial advance. Argon–argon dating of glassy pillow lava from Tennena Cone has yielded ages of 0.011 ± 0.033 million years and 0.005 ± 0.033 million years, but further work is required to improve the precision of these ages.

Since its eruption under glacial ice, Tennena Cone has been modified by glacial erosion. This includes the steepening of its flanks and the formation of its 500 m (1,600 ft) long summit ridge, which is covered with morainal detritus. The degree of glacial erosion and the deposition of morainal detritus on the summit ridge of Tennena Cone suggest that the volcano was overlain by significantly thick ice. This ice may have also overlain the summit of Mount Edziza, which is 3.5 km (2.2 mi) to the north-northeast and 397 m (1,302 ft) higher than that of Tennena Cone.

=== Basement ===
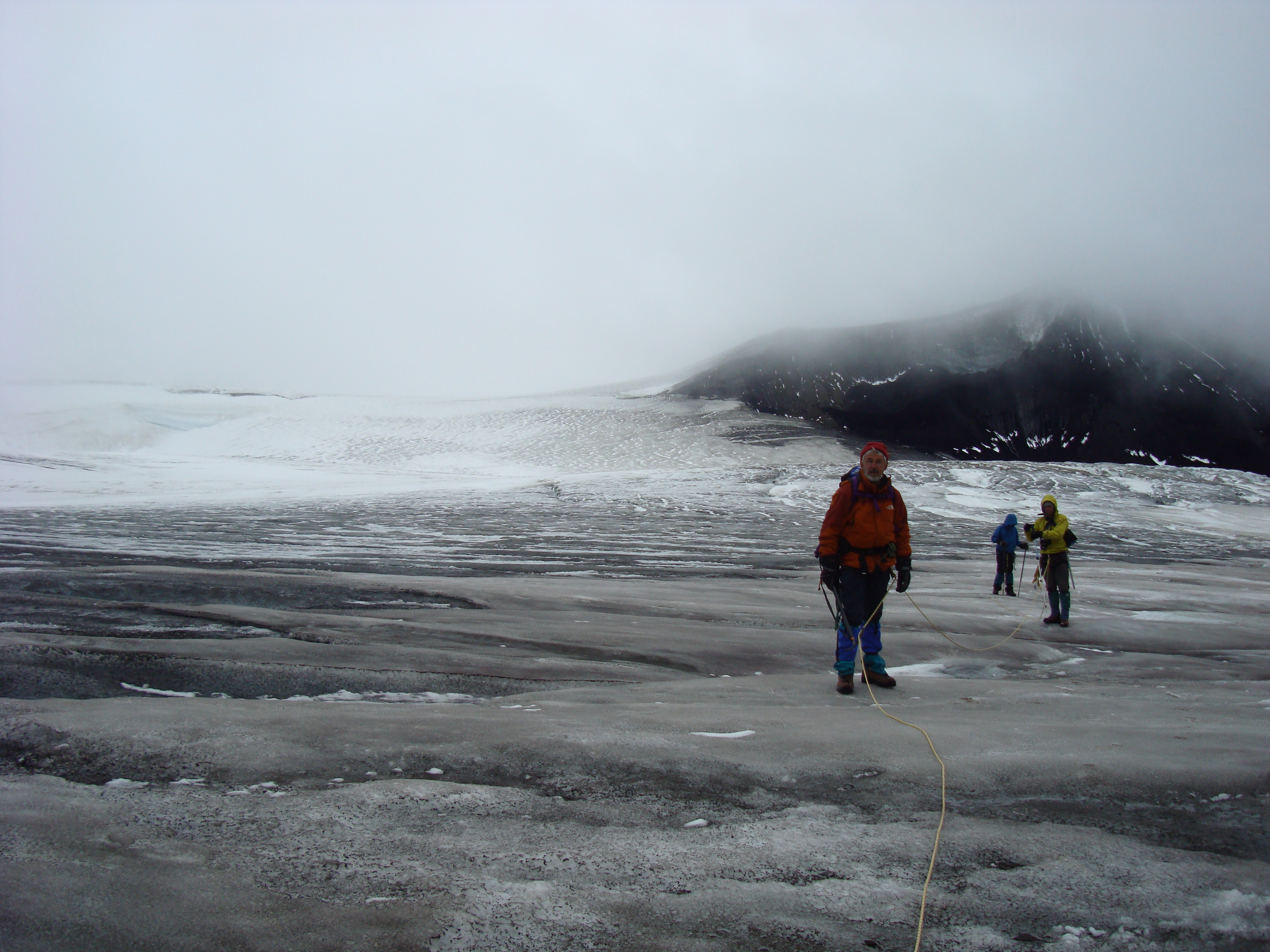
Glacier of Mount Edziza with the summit of Tennena Cone obscured by clouds in the right background

Tennena Cone overlies the Armadillo, Ice Peak, Nido and Raspberry formations, all of which are older stratigraphic units of the Mount Edziza volcanic complex. The Ice Peak Formation is the youngest of the four geological formations and is divided into two principal assemblages of Pleistocene age. The lower assemblage consists of alkali basalt and hawaiite with minor tristanite, trachybasalt and mugearite. These rocks are in the form of pillow lavas, pillow breccias, tuff breccias and ice-contact deposits, as well as subaerial lava flows and pyroclastic breccias. The upper assemblage consists of alkali basalt, trachybasalt, trachyte, tristanite, benmoreite and mugearite, which compose pyroclastic breccias, lava flows and lava domes. Underlying the Ice Peak Formation are alkali basalt lava flows and flow breccias of the Tenchen Member of the Nido Formation, which were erupted from multiple volcanoes during the Pliocene.

Miocene comendite, trachyte, alkali basalt and minor sparsely porphyritic (Note: Porphyritic pertains to the resemblance of porphyry which are magmatic rocks consisting of large crystals in a fine-grained matrix.) hawaiite of the Armadillo Formation underlie the Nido Formation; they are in the form of lava flows, flow breccias, pumice, ash flows and agglutinate. The oldest geological formation underlying Tennena Cone is the Raspberry Formation, which consists of Miocene alkali basalt and minor hawaiite and mugearite. These volcanic rocks are in the form of lava flows, flow breccias and agglutinate, although pillow lava and tuff breccia occur locally. Underlying the Raspberry Formation are sedimentary, volcanic or metamorphic rocks of the Stikinia terrane, which are Paleozoic and Mesozoic in age.

=== Significance ===
Tennena Cone and its eruptive products are of geological significance because they contain an unusually wide range of features characteristic of a small-volume eruption under thick glacial ice. These features include ordinary pillow lavas and vertically oriented, distended pillow lavas, as well as massive non-pillowed lavas, interbedded gravelly sands, and sandstone which is poorly consolidated. The subglacially emplaced lavas erupted from Tennena Cone are also of geological significance because they can be traced more than 3 km (1.9 mi) away from the vent area. Their well-preserved textures and geomorphological structures can be used to help identify other subglacially-emplaced lava flows on Earth and on other terrestrial bodies such as Mars. Tennena Cone is one of two glaciovolcanic features at Mount Edziza that have been investigated in detail, the other being Pillow Ridge on the northwestern side of the mountain.

== See also ==
- List of Northern Cordilleran volcanoes
- List of volcanoes in Canada
- Volcanism of Western Canada

== Notes ==
- Hungerford, J. D.; Skilling, I.; Lloyd, A.; Edwards, B. (2006). Preliminary Interpretation on the Role of Sub-Ice Topography on the Emplacement of Basaltic Pillow Lavas at Tennana Cone, Mount Edziza Volcanic Complex, British Columbia, Canada. American Geophysical Union, Fall Meeting 2006. Astrophysics Data System. Bibcode:2006AGUFM.V53C1756H.
- Hungerford, Jefferson D. G. (2013). The Mechanics of Subglacial Basaltic Lava Flow Emplacement: Inferring Paleo-Ice Conditions (PDF) (PhD thesis). University of Pittsburgh.
