= Ice Peak Formation =

Geological formation in British Columbia, Canada

- Stratigraphic range: Pleistocene; Approx. 1 Ma
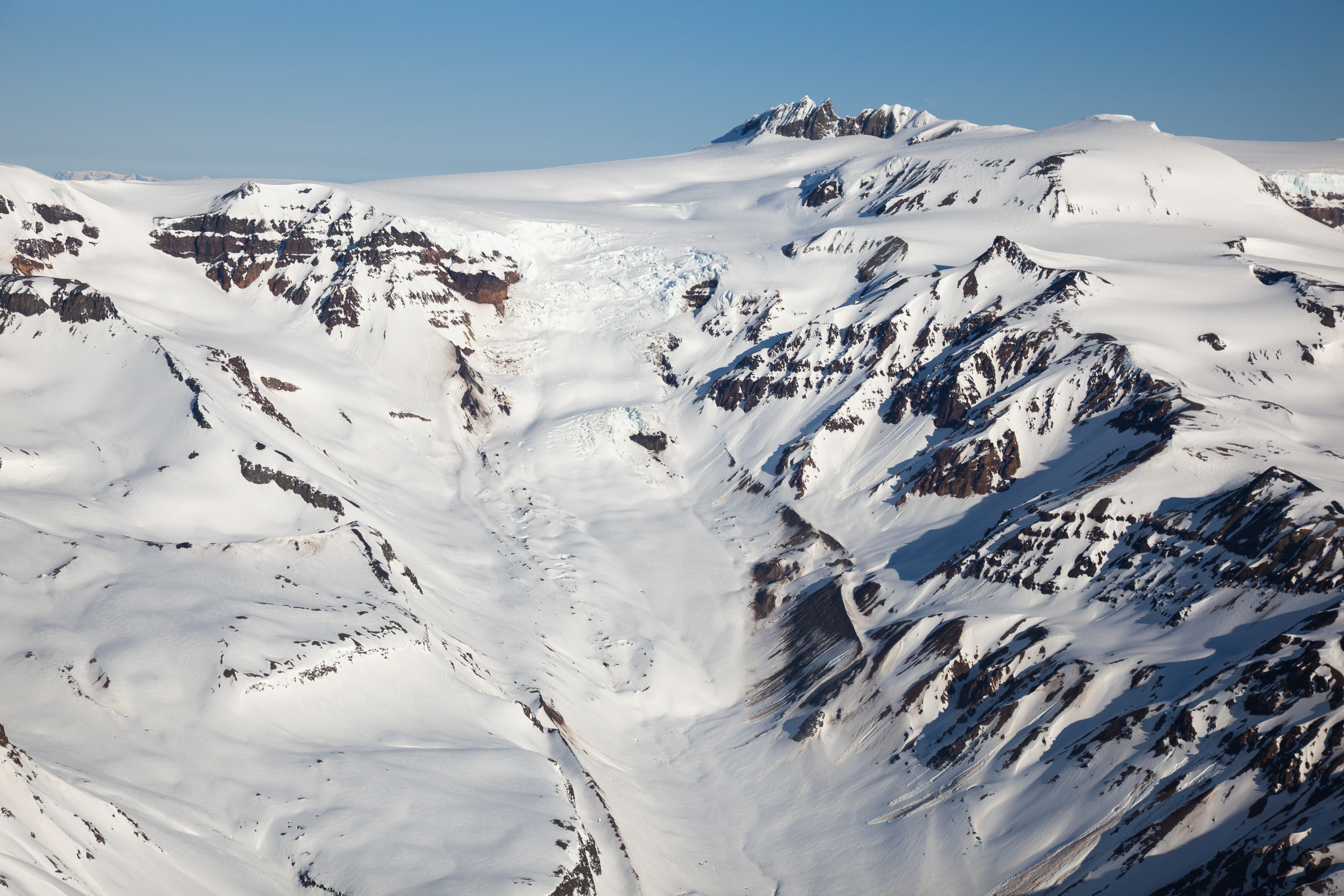
- East side of Mount Edziza; the two lateral exposures of rock in the upper left corner are part of the upper assemblage of the Ice Peak Formation.
- Type: Geological formation
- Unit of: Mount Edziza volcanic complex
- Sub-units: Upper assemblage Lower assemblage
- Underlies: Pillow Ridge Formation, Edziza Formation, Kakiddi Formation, Big Raven Formation
- Overlies: Armadillo Formation, Nido Formation, Pyramid Formation

Lithology
- Primary: Alkali basalt, hawaiite, mugearite, benmoreite, trachyte
- Other: Trachybasalt, tristanite

Location
- Coordinates: 57°41′25″N 130°38′08″W
- Region: British Columbia
- Country: Canada

Type section
- Named for: Ice Peak
- Named by: Souther et al., 1984
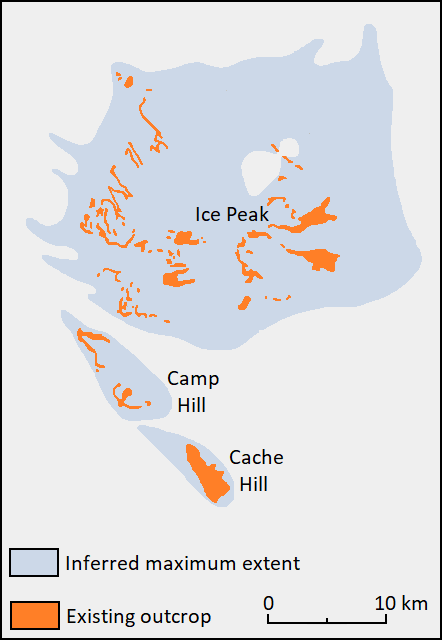
- Paleogeological map of the Ice Peak Formation at the end of the Ice Peak eruptive period

The Ice Peak Formation (IPF) is a stratigraphic unit of Pleistocene age in northwestern British Columbia, Canada. It is the seventh youngest and fifth most voluminous of 13 geological formations comprising the Mount Edziza volcanic complex (MEVC), which consists of volcanic rocks of late Cenozoic age. The IPF is underlain by the 6.3-million-year-old Armadillo Formation, the 4.4-million-year-old Nido Formation and the 1.1-million-year-old Pyramid Formation, all of which are older units of the MEVC. Overlying the IPF are the younger and much less voluminous Pillow Ridge, Edziza, Kakiddi and Big Raven formations of the MEVC; all of these formations were deposited by volcanic eruptions in the last 0.9 million years. The stratigraphic position of the Ice Peak Formation suggests that it is about 1 million years old.

The IPF is subdivided into two units informally called the upper and lower assemblages. The upper assemblage consists of randomly oriented alkali basalt, hawaiite, trachybasalt, tristanite, mugearite, benmoreite and trachyte which are in the form of lavas and pyroclastic rocks. This assemblage forms the upper portion of Ice Peak, as well as The Neck, the Camp and Cache hills and the Ornostay and Koosick bluffs. The lower assemblage consists mainly of alkali basalt and hawaiite, but also includes small volumes of trachybasalt, mugearite and tristanite. It forms the bulk of the Ice Peak volcanic pile and occurs on the surrounding Big Raven Plateau.

== History ==
The Ice Peak Formation was first defined by Jack Souther, Richard Lee Armstrong and J. Harakal in 1984. It was mapped as one of 15 geological formations of the Mount Edziza volcanic complex, a group of late Cenozoic volcanic rocks in northwestern British Columbia, Canada. In 1988, Jack Souther mapped the IPF in more detail and the number of geological formations comprising the volcanic complex had dropped to 13; the Sheep Track and Kounugu formations were reassigned as members of the Big Raven and Nido formations, respectively, and are no longer recognized.

== Stratigraphy ==
Stratigraphically, the IPF is subdivided into two units informally called the upper and lower assemblages. The lower assemblage is the most widespread, having been largely buried under younger rocks and felsenmeer, till, glacial and fluvial outwash, as well as solifluction deposits. Most exposures of this assemblage occur along the western and eastern edges of the Big Raven Plateau in ridges and at the head of valleys. The upper assemblage is exposed along the Mess Creek Escarpment at the southwestern end of the Big Raven Plateau, along the north side of Sezill Creek valley at the western end of the plateau, at the head of valleys at the northwestern end of the plateau, at the southern end of Mount Edziza in the middle of the plateau, and on ridges east of Mount Edziza.

The IPF is the seventh-youngest unit of the MEVC and has a volume of 76.7 cubic kilometres (18.4 cubic miles), making it the fifth-most voluminous geological formation of the MEVC. It is also the youngest geological formation of the MEVC that contains more than 70 km^{3} (17 mi^{3}) of volcanic material. The IPF overlies the 1.1-million-year-old Pyramid Formation, the 4.4-million-year-old Nido Formation and the 6.3-million-year-old Armadillo Formation, all of which are older units of the MEVC. Overlying the IPF are the much less voluminous Pillow Ridge, Edziza, Kakiddi and Big Raven formations; these are younger geological units of the MEVC deposited by volcanic eruptions in the last 0.9 million years.

== Lithology ==
Lithologically, the IPF is the most diverse geological formation of the MEVC. It is structurally and petrographically complex, containing a significant volume of volcanic rocks of intermediate composition such as tristanite, trachybasalt, mugearite and benmoreite. The only volcanic rocks of mafic composition are alkali basalt and hawaiite, whereas the main volcanic rock of felsic composition is trachyte. Basalt of the IPF is similar to older basalts throughout the MEVC with the exception of its vesicular texture; it contains open vesicles rather than amygdules filled with calcite or silica. IPF trachyte is similar in composition to the younger Edziza Formation trachyte, but they are separated by an erosion surface. Most of the volcanic rocks comprising the IPF were erupted from Ice Peak, the prominent south peak of Mount Edziza. It is the western rim of a small caldera which formed on the summit of a stratovolcano whose northern flank is buried under the younger, 2,786 m (9,140 ft) high stratovolcano of the Edziza Formation.

=== Upper assemblage ===
Randomly oriented alkali basalt, hawaiite, trachybasalt, tristanite, mugearite, benmoreite and trachyte lavas and pyroclastic rocks form the upper assemblage. In addition to occurring on the gently sloping surface of the Big Raven Plateau, these rocks also form Camp Hill, Ornostay Bluff, Cache Hill, Koosick Bluff, The Neck and the upper portion of Ice Peak. Camp Hill is a small volcanic cone rising about 180 m (590 ft) above the southwestern portion of the Big Raven Plateau near the Mess Creek Escarpment. About 10 km (6.2 mi) to the southeast, the volcanic cone of Cache Hill rises about 120 m (390 ft) on a ridge between the Big Raven Plateau in the north and the Kitsu Plateau in the southwest. The Ornostay and Koosick bluffs are on the lower western flank of Ice Peak adjacent to the head of Sezill Creek. On the northern side of Sorcery Ridge east of the Big Raven Plateau, the roughly 300 m (980 ft) in diameter volcanic plug of The Neck rises 215 metres (705 feet) above an east–west valley immediately south of Idiji Ridge.

==== Ice Peak ====
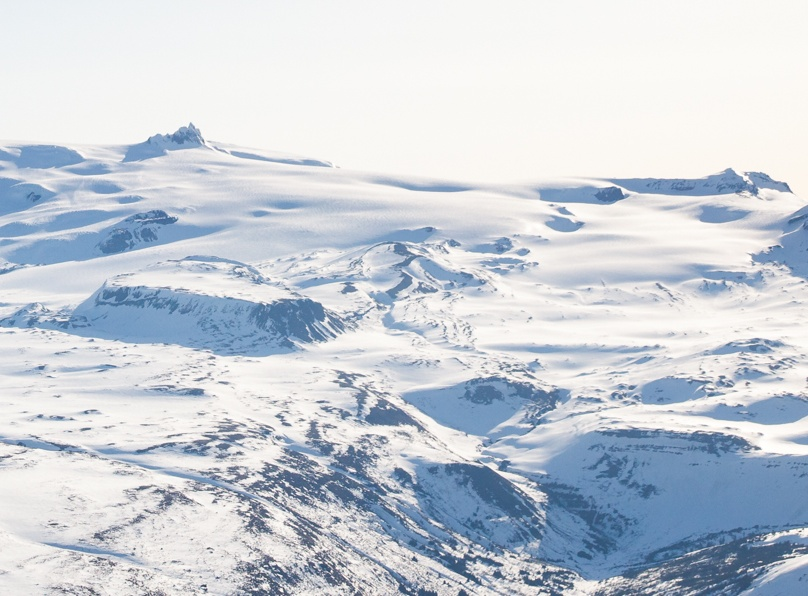
The head of Sezill Creek valley with Ornostay Bluff at centre-left and Ice Peak at upper right

Highly irregular lava flows up to 90 m (300 ft) thick are exposed in the summit region of Ice Peak. They are mixed with equal amounts of epiclastic fill and pyroclastic breccia which, together with the lava flows, dip gently to the west, northwest and southwest from the destroyed summit crater. Most of the breccia consists of randonly oriented bombs and blocks, but ash and cinders are locally preserved under the lava flows as beds or thick deposits. Basalt, mugearite and trachybasalt are the main volcanic rocks comprising the lava flows, whereas trachyte is present in smaller volumes. The trachybasalt is slightly porphyritic which contrasts with the highly porphyritic basalts and mugearites. Two lobes of trachyte originating from under the central ice cap form the Ornostay and Koosick bluffs, both of which are similar in composition and geomorphology. The steep sides and unusually large thicknesses of these two bluffs is attributed to them having been extruded through glacial ice.

Extensive erosion of the stratovolcano on its eastern side has exposed sills, dikes and irregular intrusions, all of which are compositionally identical to the upper assemblage lavas. The smallest dikes are only a few centimetres wide, whereas tabular intrusions reach thicknesses of 120–150 m (390–490 ft) and lengths of more than 1.5 km (0.93 mi). At the head of Tennaya Creek is a series of spurs containing white recessive bands of silt and ashy clay. These well-stratified bands, intermixed with cobbles and pebbles of Ice Peak lava, probably formed when ejecta from the volcano deposited in a periodic crater lake at the summit. Exposed in the summit area of Ice Peak are several small normal faults, the largest of which occurs just south of Tennaya Glacier. A nearby normal fault steeply dips to the east and has displaced thick, flat-lying lava flows and interbedded lacustrine deposits by about 60 m (200 ft).

==== Camp Hill ====
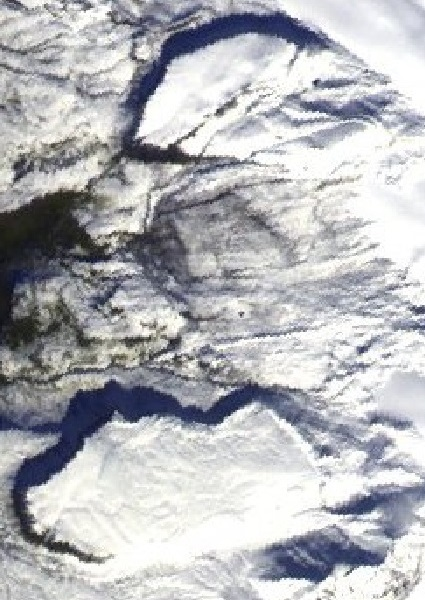
Ornostay and Koosick bluffs on the lower western flank of Ice Peak

Most of the lithology of Camp Hill is hidden due to colluvium covering much the volcanic edifice. However, exposures of its internal structure occur on the southwestern flank and in moderately incised, radial meltwater channels elsewhere. A lower unit of tuff breccia containing partially palagonitized sideromelane is locally interbedded with pillow breccia and pillow lava, as well as pahoehoe with quenched lava lobes. They are thought to have been deposited when Camp Hill first erupted under remnants of glacier ice on the Big Raven Plateau. The overlying upper unit is an assemblage of bombs, scoria, tephra and irregular lava flows deposited by volcanic activity after the surrounding ice had melted away. Both units are composed of alkali basalt or hawaiite characterized by plagioclase, pyroxene and olivine phenocrysts.

==== Cache Hill ====
Cache Hill consists of pillow lava, tuff breccia and several lava flows with a basaltic composition that overlie a gravel deposit up to 135 m (443 ft) thick. A coarsely porphyritic basalt flow forms the base of the volcano and is sporadically exposed along its southwestern flank. It contains tabular feldspar phenocrysts up to 1.5 cm (0.59 in) long that are clear to pale amber in colour, which contrasts with the medium grey matrix. Overlying the basal flow are about seven vesicular basalt flows, all of which are aphyric, fine-grained and dark grey. All of these relatively thin lava flows contain well-developed columnar joints and are interbedded with scoria deposited by lava fountaining. Like Camp Hill, the basalt at Cache Hill is either alkali basalt or hawaiite with phenocrysts of plagioclase, pyroxene and olivine.

==== The Neck ====
Trachyte is the main rock comprising The Neck, which consists of two parts. The outer part is a 2.5–3.5 m (8.2–11.5 ft) thick cylinder of fine-grained, foliated trachyte that is in the form of concentric shells. In contrast, the inner part is made up of coarse-grained trachyte that is in the form of gently curved tabular or vertical, closely stacked planar bodies. Loosely agglutinated basaltic tephra of the Beta Peak eruptive centre of the Nido Formation surrounds The Neck.

=== Lower assemblage ===
Location of the Ice Peak Formation in British Columbia, Canada

The lower assemblage consists mainly of alkali basalt and hawaiite, but also includes small volumes of intermediate lava such as trachybasalt, mugearite and tristanite. It forms the bulk of the Ice Peak volcanic pile and is largely in the form of an asymmetrical basaltic shield volcano. The basalt is in the form of relatively thin lava flows that are normally less than 3 m (9.8 ft) thick. These thin, columnar-jointed lava flows extend at least 16 km (9.9 mi) from the central vent in all directions with the exception of the southern flows, which travelled south for only about 5 km (3.1 mi). The intermediate lavas are in the form of several thick flows at the eastern end of a ridge extending east from Nanook Dome where they overlie Pliocene basalt of the Nido Formation.

The northeastern flank of the Ice Peak volcanic pile contains up to 78 m (256 ft) of sideromelane tuff breccia and pillow lava. These deposits are exposed on two ridges and are believed to have formed when basaltic lava of the lower assemblage ponded against stagnant ice in cirques. The lowermost basalt flow of the lower assemblage along the northern side of Sezill Creek valley contains pillows at its base. It also directly overlies hyaloclastites and is brecciated and deformed, suggesting it may have been extruded onto a glacier or an ice sheet.

== Age ==
Potassium–argon dating of IPF hawaiite from an unnamed ridge at 57°41.4′N 130°32.1′W has yielded an anomalously old age of 3.7 ± 1.0 million years, which contains a large margin of error and has therefore been disregarded. The second-oldest potassium–argon date, 2.8 ± 0.2 million years, comes from IPF hawaiite northwest of Cache Hill. A nearly identical potassium–argon date of 2.8 ± 0.1 million years has been obtained from IPF trachyte at the head of Sezill Creek valley between the Ornostay and Koosick bluffs. Massive trachyte in the upper part of Ice Peak has yielded potassium–argon dates of 1.5 ± 0.4 million years and 1.5 ± 0.1 million years. Similarly, a potassium–argon date of 1.6 ± 0.2 million years has been obtained from trachyte of The Neck. The youngest IPF potassium–argon date of 1.2 ± 0.1 million years is from trachyte on top of Idiji Ridge southeast of the summit of Ice Peak. These dates being older than those of the underlying 1.1-million-year-old Pyramid Formation may be partially due to excess argon in IPF rocks; the dates are therefore considered unreliable. The true age of the IPF is estimated to be about one million years old due to its stratigraphic position under the 0.9-million-year-old Edziza Formation.

== See also ==
- Volcanism of the Mount Edziza volcanic complex
