= Idiji Ridge =

Mountain ridge in the country of Canada

- Location within British Columbia

Highest point
- Elevation: 2,359 m (7,740 ft)
- Coordinates: 57°40′35.51″N 130°37′23.35″W

Geography
- Country: Canada
- Province: British Columbia
- District: Cassiar Land District
- Parent range: Tahltan Highland
- Topo map: NTS 104G10 Mount Edziza

Idiji Ridge is a mountain ridge extending east of Tencho Glacier on the southern flank of Mount Edziza in northwestern British Columbia, Canada. It is bounded on the south by a valley containing an unnamed creek, on the east by Tennaya Creek valley and on the north by cirques extending east of Ice Peak. Idiji Ridge takes its name from the adjacent Idiji Glacier; Idiji means "it thunders" in the Tahltan language.

The highest point of Idiji Ridge reaches an elevation of 2,359 metres (7,740 feet) at its westernmost end. Idiji Ridge is one of three ridges east of the Big Raven Plateau named by Canadian volcanologist Jack Souther, the other two being Cartoona Ridge and Sorcery Ridge to the south.

== Geology ==
The base of Idiji Ridge consists of sedimentary, volcanic and metamorphic rocks of Mesozoic and Paleozoic age. These rocks are overlain by Miocene alkali basalt flows of the Raspberry Formation, the oldest geological formation of the Mount Edziza volcanic complex. The Raspberry rocks are overlain by Pliocene alkali basalt flows of the Tenchen Member of the Nido Formation which are overlain by Pleistocene comendite, comenditic trachyte and pantellerite of the Pyramid Formation.

Overlying the Pyramid Formation is Pleistocene alkali basalt, hawaiite and minor tristanite, trachybasalt and mugearite of the lower assemblage of the Ice Peak Formation which are in the form of lava flows and pyroclastic breccia. The upper assemblage of the Ice Peak Formation is mainly present at the western end of Idiji Ridge. It consists of Pleistocene alkali basalt, trachybasalt, tristanite, mugearite, benmoreite and trachyte that are in the form of lava flows, lava domes and pyroclastic breccia.

The youngest rocks comprising Idiji Ridge are Holocene alkali basalts of the Big Raven Formation which occur at the westernmost end of the ridge. These alkali basalts are in the form of volcanic bombs, agglutinate and lava flows.

== See also ==
- Volcanism of the Mount Edziza volcanic complex
