= Sorcery Ridge =

Mountain ridge in the country of Canada

- Location within British Columbia

Highest point
- Elevation: 2,039 m (6,690 ft)
- Coordinates: 57°39′21.85″N 130°36′54.15″W

Geography
- Country: Canada
- Province: British Columbia
- District: Cassiar Land District
- Parent range: Tahltan Highland
- Topo map: NTS 104G10 Mount Edziza

Sorcery Ridge is a mountain ridge extending east of Tencho Glacier on the southern flank of Mount Edziza in northwestern British Columbia, Canada. It is bounded on the north and south by valleys containing unnamed streams while to the east and northeast it is bounded by Tennaya Creek valley. Sorcery Ridge is the namesake of Sorcery Creek which flows adjacent to Tennaya Creek from another ridge just to the south.

The highest point of Sorcery Ridge reaches an elevation of 2,039 metres (6,690 feet) at its westernmost end. Sorcery Ridge is one of three ridges east of the Big Raven Plateau named by Canadian volcanologist Jack Souther, the other two being Cartoona Ridge to the south and Idiji Ridge to the north.

== Geology ==
Sorcery Ridge consists largely of sedimentary, volcanic, granitic and metamorphic rocks of Mesozoic and Paleozoic age. These rocks are overlain by Pliocene alkali basalt flows of the Nido Formation which are in turn overlain by Pleistocene alkali basalt, hawaiite, tristanite, trachybasalt and mugearite flows and pyroclastic breccia of the Ice Peak Formation. The Nido and Ice Peak formations are two geological formations comprising the Mount Edziza volcanic complex which has been the focus of volcanic activity since the Miocene.

The northern side of Sorcery Ridge contains a 215-metre-high (705-foot) volcanic plug called The Neck. It consists mainly of trachyte of the Ice Peak Formation and is about 300 metres (980 feet) in diameter, representing the eroded remains of a parasitic vent on the southeastern flank of the Ice Peak stratovolcano. Two distinctive flows of Edziza obsidian are present on Sorcery Ridge which are also part of the Ice Peak Formation.

== See also ==
- Volcanism of the Mount Edziza volcanic complex
