= Geology of São Tomé and Príncipe =

São Tomé and Príncipe both formed within the past 30 million years due to volcanic activity in deep water along the Cameroon line. Long-running interactions with seawater and different eruption periods have generated a wide variety of different igneous and volcanic rocks on the islands with complex mineral assemblages.

== Stratigraphy, tectonics and mineralogy ==
São Tomé and Príncipe has comparatively very recent geology, with most of the islands forming in the last 30 million years of the Cenozoic, due to volcanic activity along the Cameroon line, with most of the island building taking place within the past 15 million years.

=== São Tomé ===
On the island of São Tomé itself, a large stratovolcano rises from abyssal plain a total of 5000 meters, protruding two kilometers above sea level. Large parts of the center of the island remain unmapped.

The basement rock of the islands is Cretaceous quartzose sandstone, which outcrops at a few points in the center of the island. However, the islands are almost entirely basalt formed from lava flows as well as plugs and necks of phonolite. Palagonite tuff and pillow lava, resulted from rapid cooling of lava in contact with seawater. São Tomé is the younger island and 15.7 million year old trachyte is the oldest rock type on the island from the time volcanic activity began. Most other lavas formed between 13.2 million years ago and the present. The basalts have alkaline lava mineralogy, with large augite, olivine and magnetite phenocryst crystals, surrounded by a matrix of smaller crystals such as bytownite, labradorite, augite, titanite and iron oxides. In a few cases, some basalts contain hornblende phenocrysts, while phonolite contains sodalite and trachyte has barkevicite.

Although the magma that formed São Tomé was originally sourced from the mantle, fractional crystallization in contact with seawater resulted in magnetite, apatite, plagioclase, hornblende, augite and olivine.

=== Príncipe ===
Príncipe is situated in shallower water, rising 3000 meters from the seafloor to 948 meters above sea level at Pico do Príncipe. The island is built on a base of palagonite breccia, which includes pieces of basalt that was part of a tholeiitic magma series which developed deep below water. Basalt covers the north of the island, while tephrite and phonolite are common in the south. Geologists have sub-divided the basalts between older series of basanite and hawaiite, which are intruded by many, younger nephelinite and basanite basalt dikes. The older basalts contain phenocrysts of olivine, titanaugite, titano-magnetite and plagioclase, with a matrix of smaller crystals of all of the same minerals except for olivine. The younger lavas are somewhat different with nepheline, alkali feldspar and apatite phenocrysts. In the south and center of the island, these younger basalts are overlain by tristanite, phonolite and trachyphonolite lavas. The phonolite has a variety of phenocrysts including nepheline, augite, barkevicite, titanite, magnetite, augite, sanidine, aegirine and possibly small amounts of plagioclase and sodalite

Potassium-argon dating of the tholeiitic basalts in the basement breccia of the island gives an age of 30.9 million years ago for the oldest rocks.

== Natural resource geology ==
São Tomé and Príncipe does not have any mining, besides small pits to supply local clay, gravel and stone demand. For years, geologists and the country's government suspected that oil might be present offshore, like Bioko in Equatorial Guinea. The government established a National Petroleum Agency in 2004 to license exploration. Through 2014, international companies prospected in the Joint Development Zone with Nigeria and the Exclusive Economic Zone but failed to find recoverable quantities of oil.
