= Trachyandesite =

Extrusive igneous rock

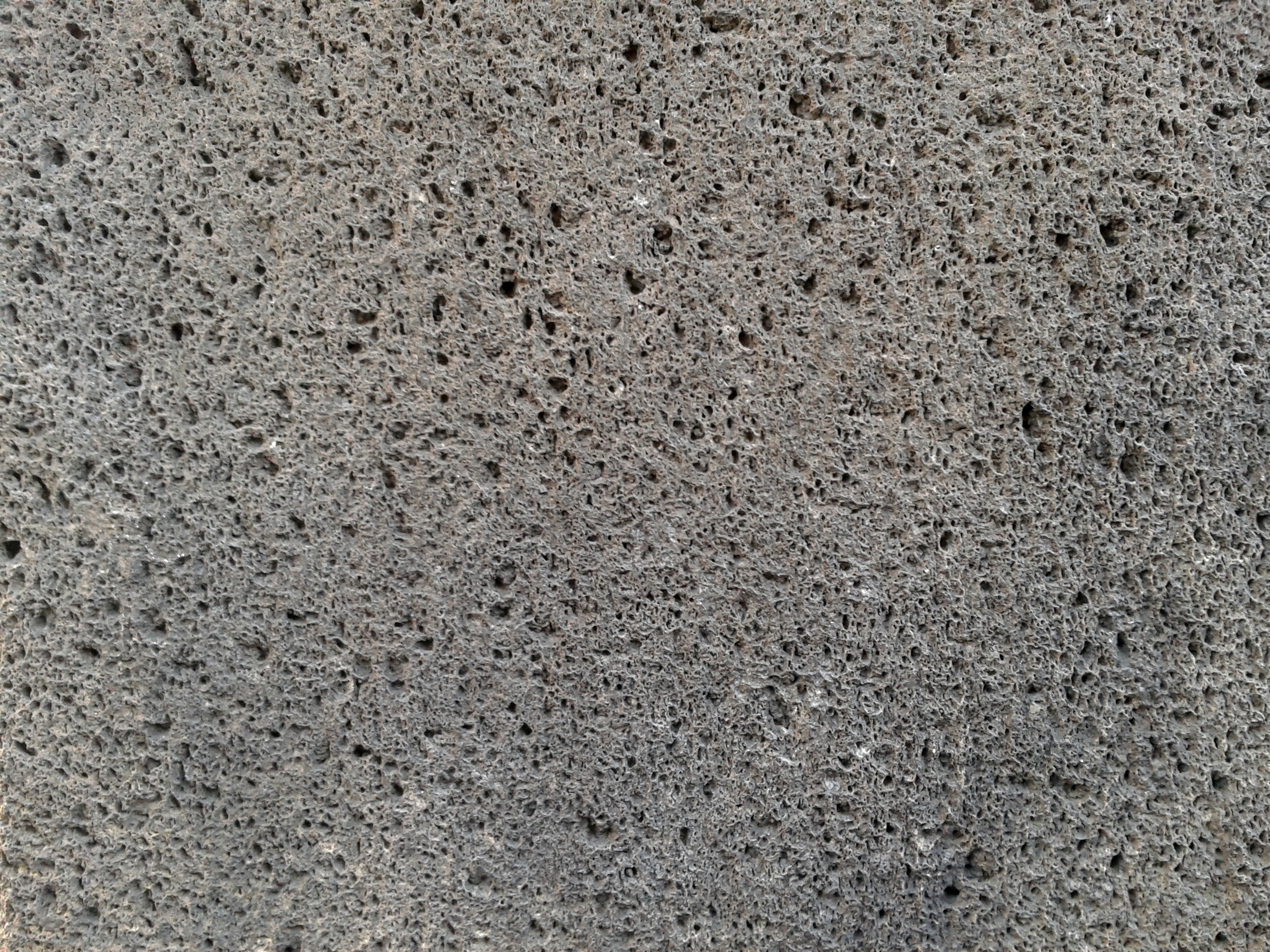
A cut block of trachyandesite lava from a volcano in Auvergne, France, used as building stone, forming part of the walls of Clermont-Ferrand Cathedral, France

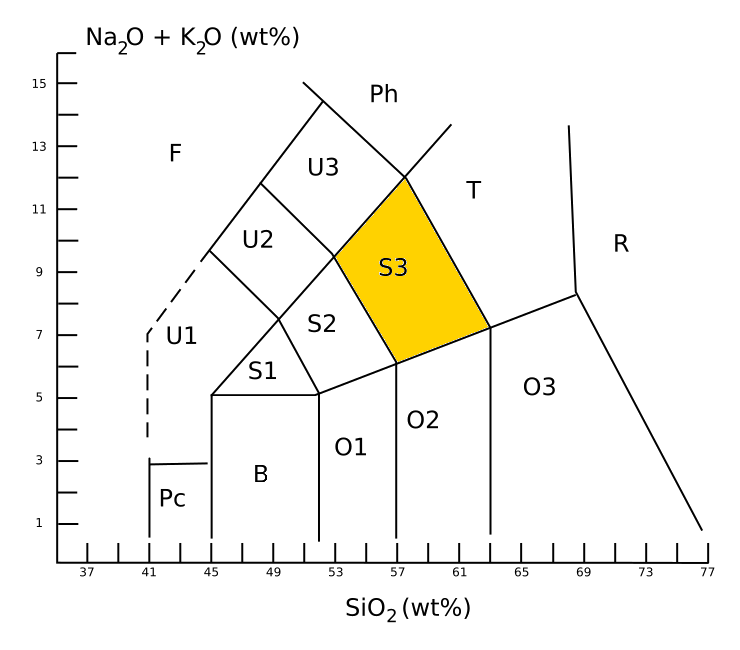
Trachyandesite is field S3 in the TAS diagram

Trachyandesite is an extrusive igneous rock with a composition between trachyte and andesite. It has little or no free quartz, but is dominated by sodic plagioclase and alkali feldspar. It is formed from the cooling of lava enriched in alkali metals and with an intermediate content of silica.

The term trachyandesite had begun to fall into disfavor by 1985 but was revived to describe extrusive igneous rocks falling into the S3 field of the TAS classification. These are divided into sodium-rich benmoreite and potassium-rich latite.

Trachyandesitic magma can produce explosive Plinian eruptions, such as happened at Tambora in 1815. The Eyjafjallajökull 2010 eruption (VEI-4), which disrupted European and transatlantic air travel from 15-20 April 2010, for some time was dominated by trachyandesite.

== Petrology ==
Trachyandesite is characterized by a silica content near 58% and a total alkali oxide content near 9%. This places trachyandesite in the S3 field of the TAS diagram. When it is possible to identify the minerals present, trachyandesite is characterized by a high content of sodic plagioclase, typically andesine, and contains at least 10% alkali feldspar. Common mafic accessory minerals are amphibole, biotite or pyroxene. Small amounts of nepheline may be present and apatite is a common accessory mineral. Trachyandesite is not a recognized rock type in the QAPF classification, which is based on the actual mineral content. However, latite is recognized in this classification, while benmoreite would likely fall into either the latite or the andesite fields.

Trachyandesite magmas can have a relatively high sulfur content, and their eruption can inject great quantities of sulfur into the stratosphere. The sulfur may take the form of anhydrite phenocrysts in the magma. The 1982 El Chichón eruption produced trachyandesite pumice rich in anhydrite, and released 2.2 × 10^{7} metric tons of sulfur.

== Varieties ==
Sodium-rich trachyandesite (with %Na_{2}O > %K_{2}O + 2) is called benmoreite, while the more potassic form is called latite. Feldspathoid-bearing latite is sometimes referred to as tristanite. Basaltic trachyandesite is transitional to basalt and likewise comes in two varieties, mugearite (sodium-rich) and shoshonite (potassium-rich).

== Occurrence ==
Trachyandesite is a member of the alkaline magma series, in which alkaline basaltic magma experiences fractional crystallization while still underground. This process removes calcium, magnesium, and iron from the magma. As a result, trachyandesite is common wherever alkali magma is erupted, including late eruptions of oceanic islands and in continental rift valleys and mantle plumes.

Trachyandesite is found in the Yellowstone area as part of the Absaroka Volcanic Supergroup, and has been erupted in arc volcanism in Mesoamerica and at Mount Tambora.
