= Alkaline magma series =

Series of alkaline magmas produced by igneous differentiation

TAS diagram showing chemical composition range of alkaline volcanic rocks (blue area) and sub-alkaline volcanic rocks (yellow area)

The alkaline magma series is a chemically distinct range of magma compositions that describes the evolution of an alkaline mafic magma into a more evolved, silica-rich end member.

== Geochemical characterization ==
Rocks in the alkaline magma series are distinguished from rocks in the subalkaline tholeiitic and calc-alkaline magma series by their high content of alkali metal oxides (K_{2}O plus Na_{2}O) relative to silica (SiO_{2}). They are distinct from the rare peralkaline magmas, which have excess alkali oxides relative to alumina (Na_{2}O + K_{2}O > Al_{2}O_{3}).

Alkaline magmas tend to show high titanium oxide (TiO_{2}) content, typically in excess of 3% by weight. Other incompatible elements, such as phosphorus and light rare earth elements, are also elevated. This is attributed to a very low degree of partial melting of the source rock, with only 5% or less of the source rock going into the magma melt.

== Petrography ==
All alkaline series magmas are thought to have evolved from a primitive mafic alkaline magma, either an alkalic picrite basalt or an ankaramite. This evolves to an alkali olivine basalt or basanite. Thereafter the series branches to the sodic series, the potassic series, or the nephelinic, leucitic, and analcitic series.

The sodic series evolves through hawaiite or nepheline hawaiite through mugearite or nepheline mugearite and benmoreite or nepheline benmoreite to trachyte or phonolite. The potassic series evolves through trachybasalt or leucite trachybasalt through tristanite or leucite tristanite to potassic trachyte or leucite phonolite. The nephelinic, leucitic and analcitic series evolves from nephelinite or melilite through analcite to leucitite or wyomingite. The latter two may also be produced by evolution of leucite trachybasalt.

The less evolved alkali rocks tend to contain phenocrysts of olivine, and almost all have augite phenocrysts with elevated titanium, aluminum, and sodium compared with the calcic augite phenocrysts of tholeiites.

Peralkaline rhyolites (comendite or pantellerite) may be generated by fractionation of alkali basalt magma.

== Geologic context ==
Alkaline magmas are characteristic of continental rifting, areas overlying deeply subducted plates, or at intraplate hotspots. They are more likely to be generated at greater depths in the mantle than subalkaline magmas.

Alkaline rocks are rare in the Archean, but become common in the Proterozoic. Alkaline rocks with an age close to 570 million years are common around the perimeters of many continental shields and are evidence of worldwide rifting at that time.

== See also ==
- Petrology
- Igneous differentiation
