= Icebridge =

Icebridge can refer to:

- Ice bridge, a frozen natural structure formed over seas, bays, rivers or lake surfaces
- Operation IceBridge, a NASA mission to monitor changes in polar ice
- Tennena Cone, a volcanic cone in British Columbia, Canada
