= Idiji =

Idiji can refer to:

- Idiji Glacier, a glacier in British Columbia, Canada
- Idiji Ridge, a mountain ridge in British Columbia, Canada
