= Camp Hill (British Columbia) =

Cinder cone in northern British Columbia, Canada

Coordinates: 57°35′26″N 130°46′00″W

Camp Hill is a gently sloping conical hill in Mount Edziza Provincial Park of Cassiar Land District in British Columbia, Canada. It is located southeast of the community of Telegraph Creek on the eastern side of Mess Creek between Raspberry and Taweh creeks. Camp Hill is part of the Ice Peak Formation of the Mount Edziza volcanic complex and has been described as a cinder cone.

== See also ==
- List of volcanoes in Canada
- List of Northern Cordilleran volcanoes
- Volcanism of Canada
- Volcanism of Western Canada
