= Tholeiitic magma series =

Series of sub-alkaline magmas

TAS diagram showing chemical composition range of sub-alkaline volcanic rocks including tholeiitic rocks (yellow area) and alkaline volcanic rocks (blue area)

The tholeiitic magma series (/ˌθoʊleɪˈɪtɪk/) is one of two main magma series in subalkaline igneous rocks, the other being the calc-alkaline series. A magma series is a chemically distinct range of magma compositions that describes the evolution of a mafic magma into a more evolved, silica-rich end member. Rock types of the tholeiitic magma series include tholeiitic basalt, ferro-basalt, tholeiitic basaltic andesite, tholeiitic andesite, dacite and rhyolite. The variety of basalt in the series was originally called tholeiite, but the International Union of Geological Sciences recommends that tholeiitic basalt be used in preference to that term.

Tholeiitic rock types tend to be more enriched in iron and less enriched in magnesium and aluminium than calc-alkaline rock types. They are thought to form in a less oxidized environment than calc-alkaline rocks. Tholeiitic basalt is formed at mid-ocean ridges and makes up much of the oceanic crust. Almost all the basalt found on the Moon is tholeiitic basalt.

== Geochemical characterization ==
AFM diagram showing the relative proportions of the oxides of alkalis (A), iron (F), and magnesium (M), with arrows showing the compositional change path of the magmas in the tholeiitic and the calc-alkaline magma series (BT=tholeiitic basalt, FB=ferro-basalt, ABT=tholeiitic basaltic andesite, AT=tholeiitic andesite, D=dacite, R=rhyolite, B=basalt, AB=basaltic andesite, A=andesite; dashed line=boundary between tholeiitic and calc-alkaline compositions)

Rocks in the tholeiitic magma series are classified as subalkaline (they contain less sodium than some other basalts) and are distinguished from rocks in the calc-alkaline magma series by the redox state of the magma they crystallized from (tholeiitic magmas are reduced; calc-alkaline magmas are oxidized). When the parent magmas of basalts crystallize, they preferentially crystallize the more magnesium-rich and iron-poor forms of the silicate minerals olivine and pyroxene, causing the iron content of tholeiitic magmas to increase as the melt is depleted of iron-poor crystals. However, a calc-alkaline magma is oxidized enough to precipitate significant amounts of the iron oxide magnetite, causing the iron content of the magma to remain more steady as it cools than with a tholeiitic magma.

The difference between these two magma series can be seen on an AFM diagram, a ternary diagram showing the relative proportions of the oxides Na_{2}O + K_{2}O (A), FeO + Fe_{2}O_{3} (F), and MgO (M). As magmas cool, they precipitate out significantly more iron and magnesium than alkali, causing the magmas to move towards the alkali corner as they cool. In the tholeiitic magma, magnesium-rich crystals are produced preferentially, the magnesium content of the magma plummets, causing the magma to move away from the magnesium corner until it runs low on magnesium and simply moves towards the alkali corner as it loses iron and any remaining magnesium. With the calc-alkaline series, however, the precipitation of magnetite causes the iron-magnesium ratio to remain relatively constant, so the magma moves in a straight line towards the alkali corner on the AFM diagram.

The AFM plot distinguishes the intermediate members of the tholeiitic and calc-alkali magma series quite well. However, the felsic end members of the two series are nearly indistinguishable, so granitic rocks are generally assigned to the calc-alkali magma series. The mafic end members may be distinguished by the aluminium content, with tholeiitic basalts containing 12% to 16% Al_{2}O_{3} versus 16% to 20% Al_{2}O_{3} for calc-alkali basalts.

== Petrography ==
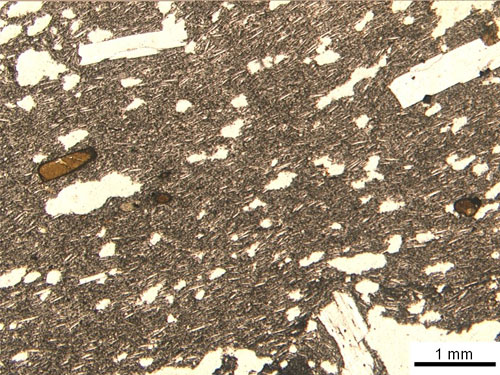
Photomicrograph of thin section of tholeiitic basalt (in plane polarized light)

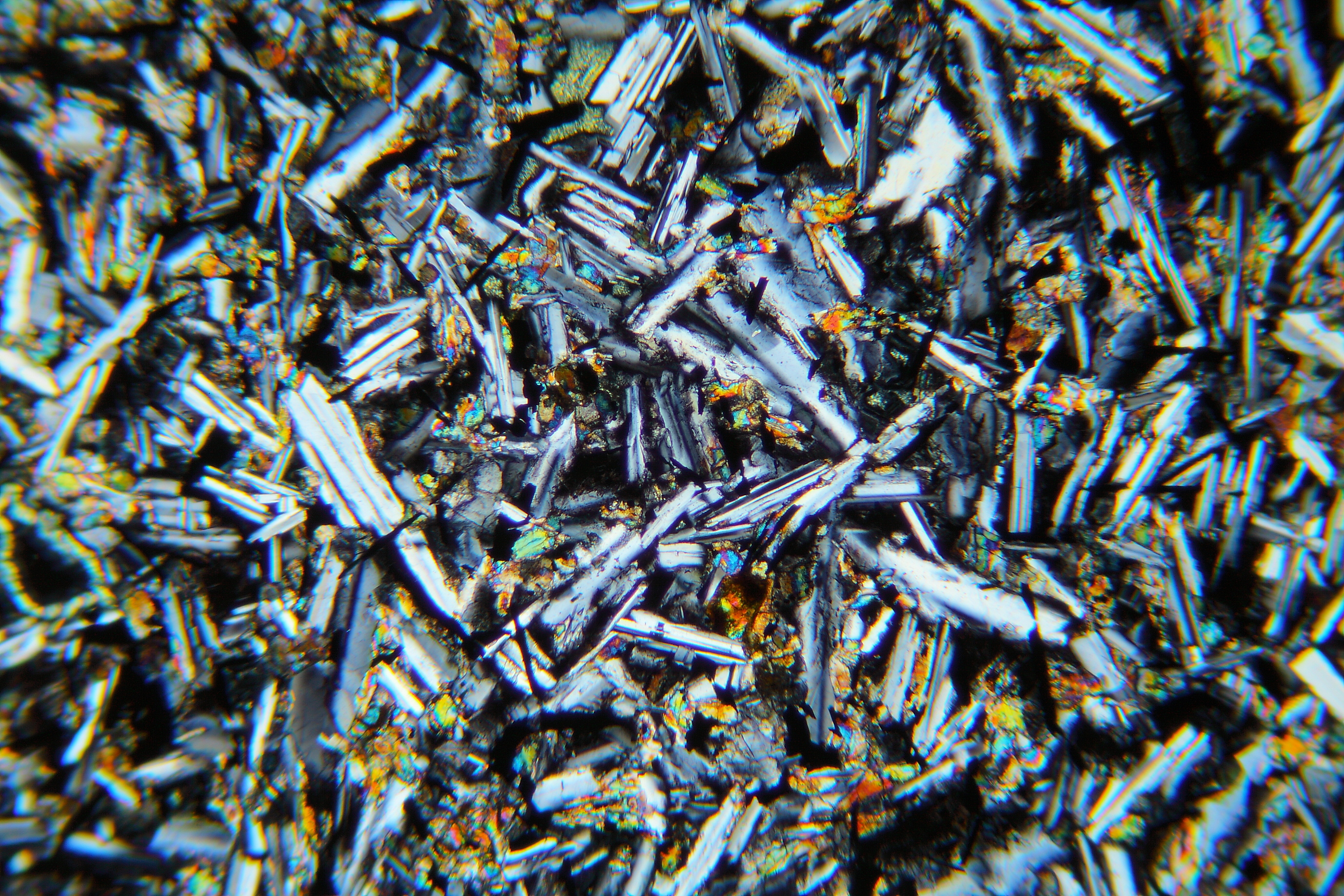
Photomicrograph of thin section of tholeiitic basalt (in cross polarized light)

Like all basalt, the tholeiitic type is dominated by olivine, clinopyroxene and plagioclase, with minor iron-titanium oxides. Orthopyroxene or pigeonite may also be present in tholeiitic basalt, and olivine, if present, may be rimmed by either of these calcium-poor pyroxenes. Tridymite or quartz may be present in the fine-grained groundmass of tholeiitic basalt, and feldspathoids are absent. Tholeiitic rocks may have a fine, glassy groundmass, as may other types of basalt.

== Geologic context ==
Tholeiitic rocks are the most common igneous rocks in Earth's crust, produced by submarine volcanism at mid-ocean ridges and make up much of the ocean crust. Tholeiitic basaltic magmas are initially generated as partial melts of lherzolite (olivine, enstatite and diopside) produced by decompression melting of the Earth's mantle. Tholeiitic basalt constituting the oceanic crust is termed MORB: mid-ocean-ridge basalt. Throughout the process of igneous differentiation, the oceanic crust acts to reduce the magma, producing the tholeiitic trend. In contrast, alkali basalts are not typical of ocean ridges, but are erupted on some oceanic islands and on continents, as also is tholeiitic basalt. Because the Moon is extremely reduced, all of its basalts are tholeiitic. Shergottites from Mars and eucrites from Vesta as also tholeiitic basalts.

== Type locality ==
Tholeiite is named for its type locality near the municipality of Tholey in Saarland, Germany.

== See also ==
- Alkaline magma series
- Petrology
