= TAS classification =

Naming system for volcanic rocks

TAS stands for Total Alkali Silica. The TAS classification can be used to assign names to many common types of volcanic rocks based upon the relationships between the combined alkali and silica contents. These chemical parameters are useful because the relative proportions of alkalis and silica are important in determining both normative mineralogy and actual mineralogy. The classification can be simple to use for rocks that have been chemically analyzed. Except for the following quotation from Johannsen (1937), this discussion is based upon Le Maitre et al (2002).

== Use of the TAS classification ==
Before using the TAS or any other classification, some particular guidance by Johannsen (1937) should be kept in mind.

Many and peculiar are the classifications that have been proposed for igneous rocks. Their variability depends in part upon the purpose for which each was intended, and in part upon the difficulties arising from the characters of the rocks themselves. The trouble is not with the classifications but with nature which did not make things right. … Rocks must be classified in order to compare them with others, previously described, of similar composition and appearance. If this cannot be done on a genetic basis, then an artificial system must answer in order to serve as a card index to rock descriptions. Although this may be an evil thing, it is, at least, the least of several evils.

The TAS classification cannot be applied to all volcanic rocks—as discussed in detail by Le Maitre et al (2002). Certain rocks cannot be classified/named using the diagram. For others, additional chemical, mineralogic, or textural criteria must be used, as e.g. lamprophyres.

The TAS classification should be applied only to rocks for which the mineral mode analysis cannot be determined. Otherwise, a scheme based on mineralogy, such as the QAPF diagram, or one of the other diagrams available for igneous rocks may be suitable. Before classifying rocks using the TAS diagram, the chemical analyses must be recalculated to 100% excluding water and carbon dioxide.

== The TAS diagram ==
TAS Diagram. This version is based upon coordinates provided by Le Maitre et al. (2002).

The names provided by Le Maitre et al. (2002) for fields in the TAS diagram are listed below.

B (Basalt)—Use normative mineralogy to subdivide.

O1 (Basaltic andesite)

O2 (Andesite)

O3 (Dacite)

R (Rhyolite)

T (Trachyte or trachydacite)—Use normative mineralogy to decide.

Ph (Phonolite)

S1 (Trachybasalt)—*Sodic and potassic variants are hawaiite and potassic trachybasalt.

S2 (Basaltic trachyandesite)—*Sodic and potassic variants are mugearite and shoshonite.

S3 (Trachyandesite—*Sodic and potassic variants are benmoreite and latite.

Pc (Picrobasalt)

U1 (Basanite or tephrite)—Use normative mineralogy to decide.

U2 (Phonotephrite)

U3 (Tephriphonolite)

F (Foidite)—When possible, classify/name according to the dominant feldspathoid. Melilitites also plot in this area and can be distinguished by additional chemical criteria.

(*)Sodic as used above means that Na_{2}O - 2 is greater than K_{2}O, and potassic that Na_{2}O - 2 is less than K_{2}O. Yet other names have been applied to rocks particularly rich in either sodium or potassium—as are ultrapotassic igneous rocks.
