= Basanite =

Type of volcanic rock

- Igneous rock
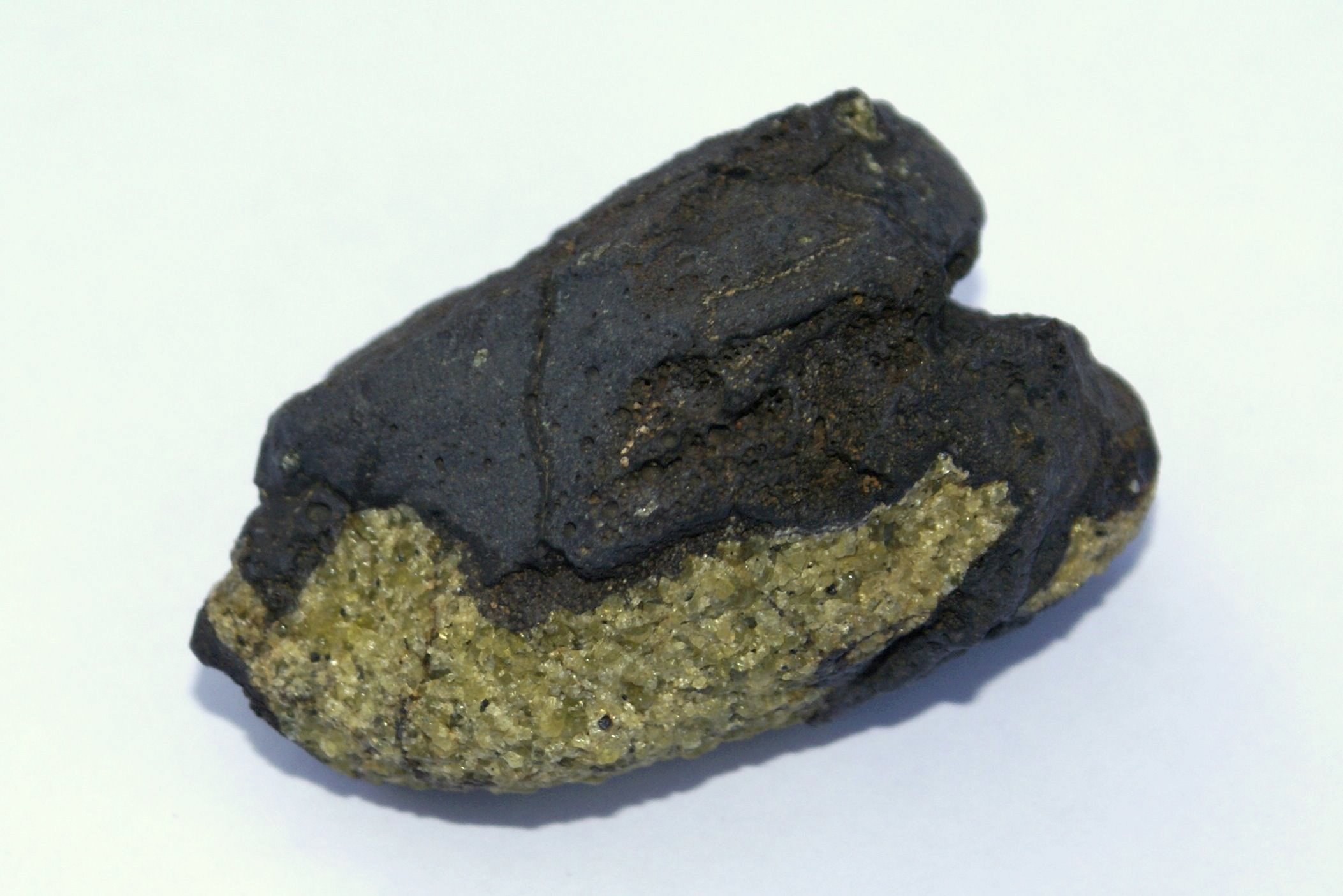
- Volcanic bomb of black basanite enclosing a xenolith of green dunite from Réunion

Basanite (/ˈbæs.əˌnaɪt/) is an igneous, volcanic (extrusive) rock with aphanitic to porphyritic texture. It is composed mostly of feldspathoids, pyroxenes, olivine, and calcic plagioclase and forms from magma low in silica and enriched in alkali metal oxides that solidifies rapidly close to the Earth's surface.

== Description ==
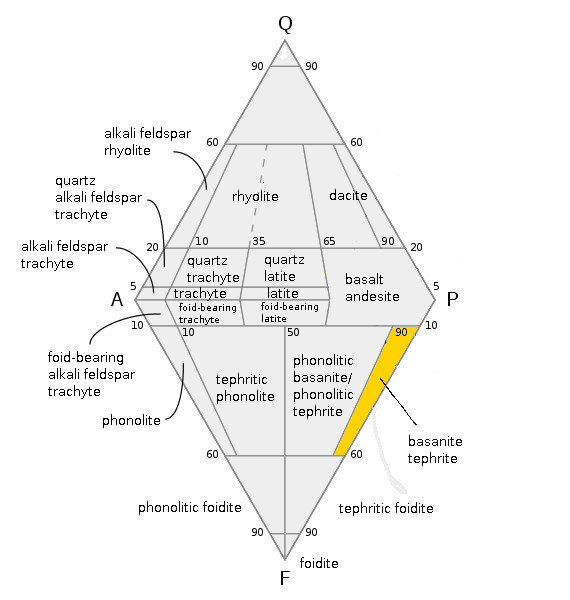
QAPF diagram showing the basanite/tephrite field in yellow

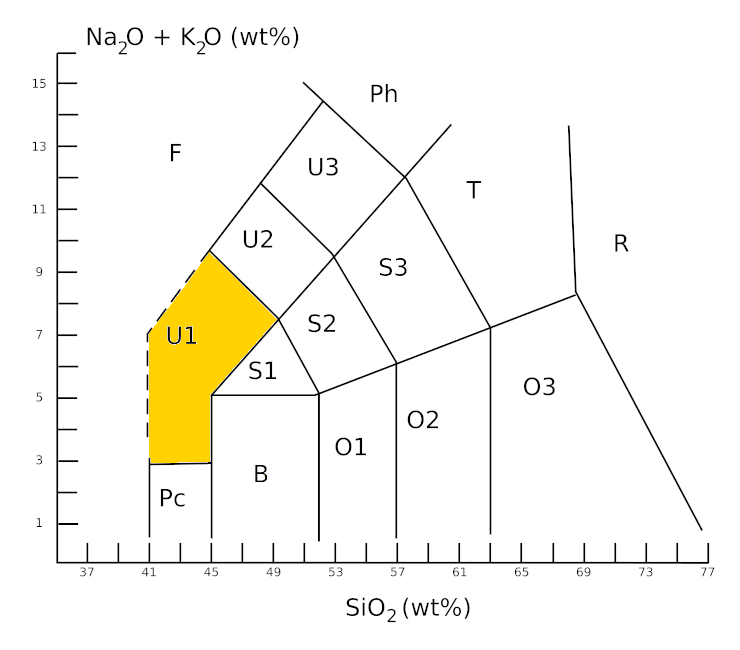
TAS diagram with basanite/tephrite field highlighted

Basanite is an aphanitic (fine-grained) igneous rock that is low in silica and enriched in alkali metals. Of its total content of quartz, feldspar, and feldspathoid (QAPF), between 10% and 60% by volume is feldspathoid and over 90% of the feldspar is plagioclase. Quartz is never present. This places basanite in the basanite/tephrite field of the QAPF diagram. Basanite is further distinguished from tephrite by having a normative olivine content greater than 10%. While the IUGS recommends classification by mineral content whenever possible, volcanic rock can be glassy or so fine-grained that this is impractical, and then the rock is classified chemically using the TAS classification. Basanite then falls into the U1 (basanite-tephrite) field of the TAS diagram. Basanite is again distinguished from tephrite by its normative olivine content and from nephelinite by a normative albite content of over 5% and a normative nepheline content under 20%.

The mineral assembly in basanite is usually abundant feldspathoids (nepheline or leucite), plagioclase, and augite, together with olivine and lesser iron-titanium oxides such as ilmenite and magnetite-ulvospinel; minor alkali feldspar may be present. Clinopyroxene (augite) and olivine are common as phenocrysts and in the matrix. The augite contains significantly greater titanium, aluminium and sodium than that in typical tholeiitic basalt. Quartz is absent, as are orthopyroxene and pigeonite.

Chemically, basanites are mafic. They are low in silica (42 to 45% SiO_{2}) and high in alkalis (3 to 5.5% Na_{2}O and K_{2}O) compared to basalt, which typically contains more SiO_{2}, as evident on the diagram used for TAS classification. Nephelinite is yet richer in Na_{2}O plus K_{2}O compared to SiO_{2}.

== Occurrences ==
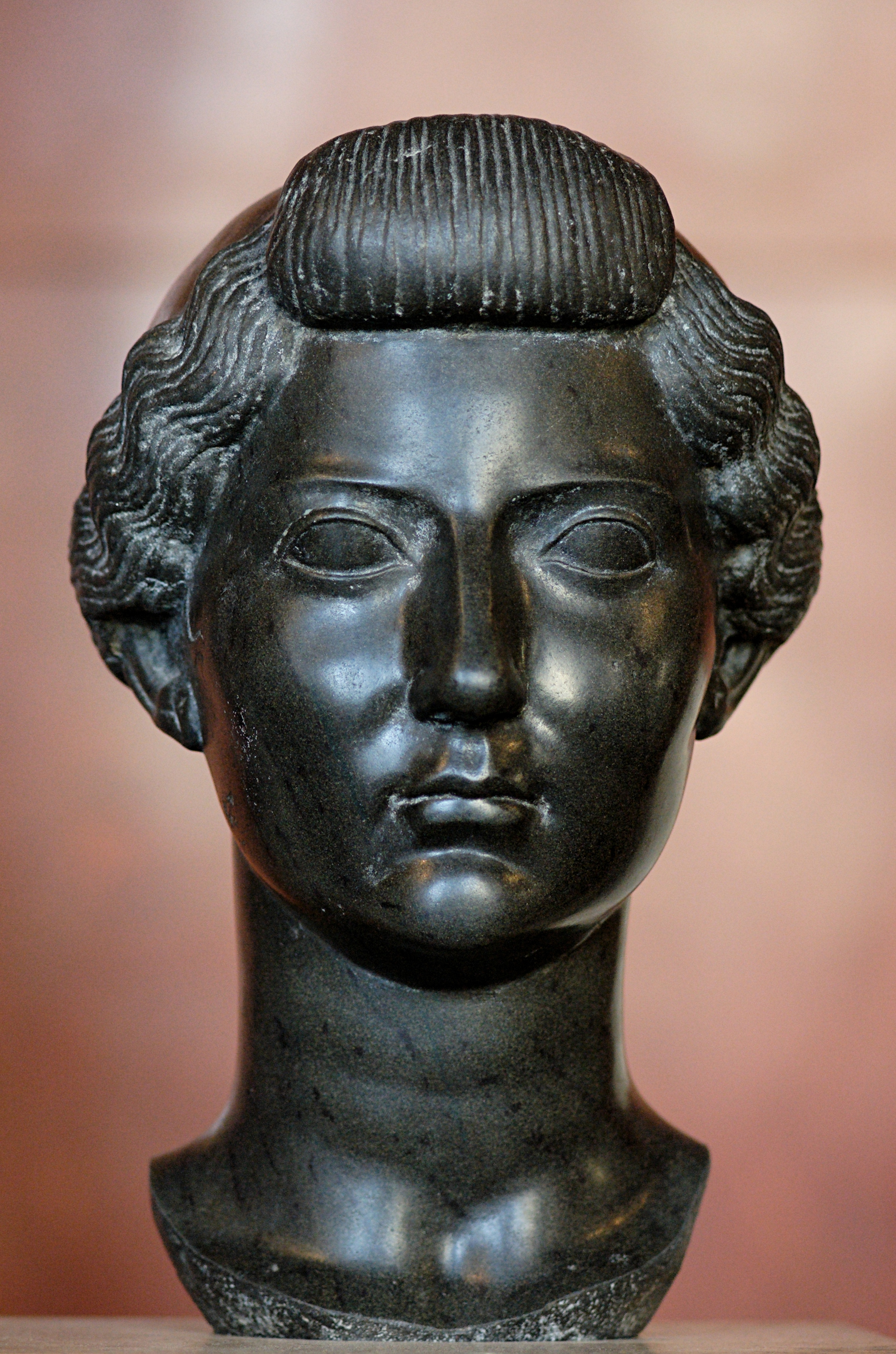
Basanite sculpture of Livia Drusilla

Basanite appears early in the alkaline magma series and basanites are found wherever alkaline magma is erupted. This includes both continental and ocean island settings. Together with basalts, they are produced by hotspot volcanism, for example in the Hawaiian Islands, the Comoros Islands and the Canary Islands. They are particularly common in areas of rifting.

During eruption of the Laacher See caldera some 12,900 years ago, the final phase of the eruption, which tapped the deepest part of the magma chamber, produced basanite lapilli mixed with phonolite lapilli. This has been interpreted as fresh magma injected into the magma chamber that may have helped trigger the eruption.

Eruption of basanite and other alkaline magmas characterizes the late alkaline phase (rejuvenation phase) of volcanic islands, which often comes 3 to 5 million years after the main shield-building phase.

== See also ==
- Ankaramite – Type of volcanic rock
- Limburgite – Type of volcanic rock
