= Benmoreite =

Volcanic rock type

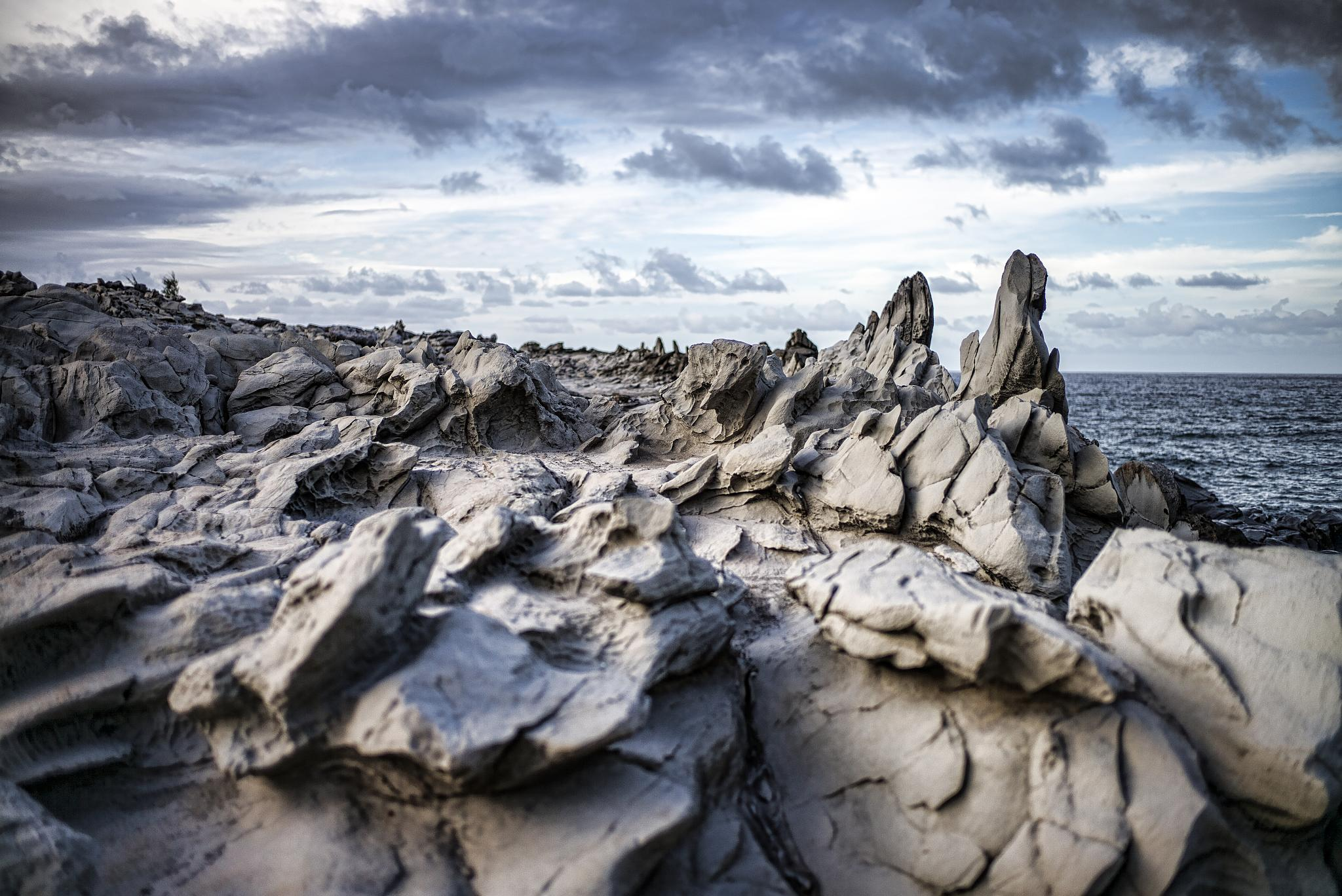
Benmoreite lava forms the "Dragon's Teeth" landmark on Maui, Hawaii

Benmoreite is a volcanic rock of intermediate composition. It is a silica-undersaturated sodium-rich variety of trachyandesite (the other kind is latite) and belongs to the alkaline suite of igneous rocks. It was named after Ben More, a mountain on the Isle of Mull, Scotland.

Benmoreite has been found, for example, on Ascension Island and Easter Island, at Mount Berlin in Antarctica, and in Atakor volcanic field, Algeria. Benmoreite lava was erupted during the 2010 eruptions of Eyjafjallajökull.

An origin by fractionation from basanite through nepheline hawaiite to nepheline benmoreite has been demonstrated for a volcanic suite in the McMurdo Volcanic Group of late Cenozoic age in McMurdo Sound area of Antarctica. Nepheline benmoreite magmas derived from mantle sources, containing lherzolite xenoliths, display similarities to some plutonic nepheline syenites.
