= Ornostay Bluff =

Volcanic bluff in British Columbia, Canada

Coordinates: 57.6997°N 130.7039°W

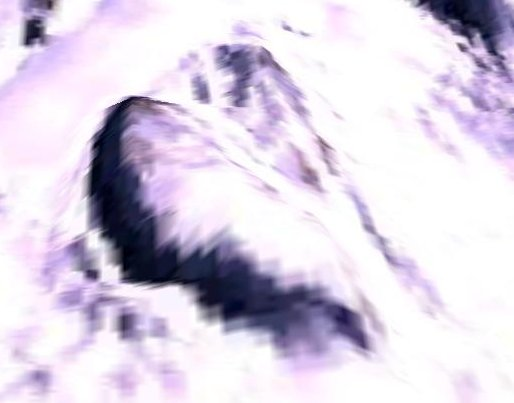
Satellite image of Ornostay Bluff.

Ornostay Bluff is a volcanic bluff in northern British Columbia, Canada, located just southwest of Mount Edziza in Mount Edziza Provincial Park and southeast of Telegraph Creek.

== See also ==
- List of volcanoes in Canada
- Volcanism of Canada
- Volcanism of Western Canada
