= The Neck (British Columbia) =

Mountain in British Columbia, Canada

- Location within British Columbia
- Interactive map of The Neck

Highest point
- Elevation: 1,830 m (6,000 ft)
- Coordinates: 57.67°N 130.58°W

Geography
- Location: British Columbia, Canada

Geology
- Rock age: Pleistocene
- Mountain type: Volcanic plug
- Volcanic zone: Northern Cordilleran Volcanic Province
- Last eruption: Pleistocene

The Neck is a mountain in northwestern British Columbia, Canada, located in Mount Edziza Provincial Park. It is a volcanic feature of the Northern Cordilleran Volcanic Province that formed in the past 1.6 million years of the Pleistocene epoch.

The Neck gets its name for the type of volcanic feature it is called a volcanic plug or a volcanic neck. These volcanic landforms are created when magma hardens within a vent on an active volcano. If a plug is preserved, erosion may remove the surrounding rock while the erosion-resistant plug remains, producing a distinctive landform.

== See also ==
- List of volcanoes in Canada
- List of Northern Cordilleran volcanoes
- Volcanism of Canada
- Volcanism of Western Canada
