= Interbedding =

Alternating beds of rock, in geology

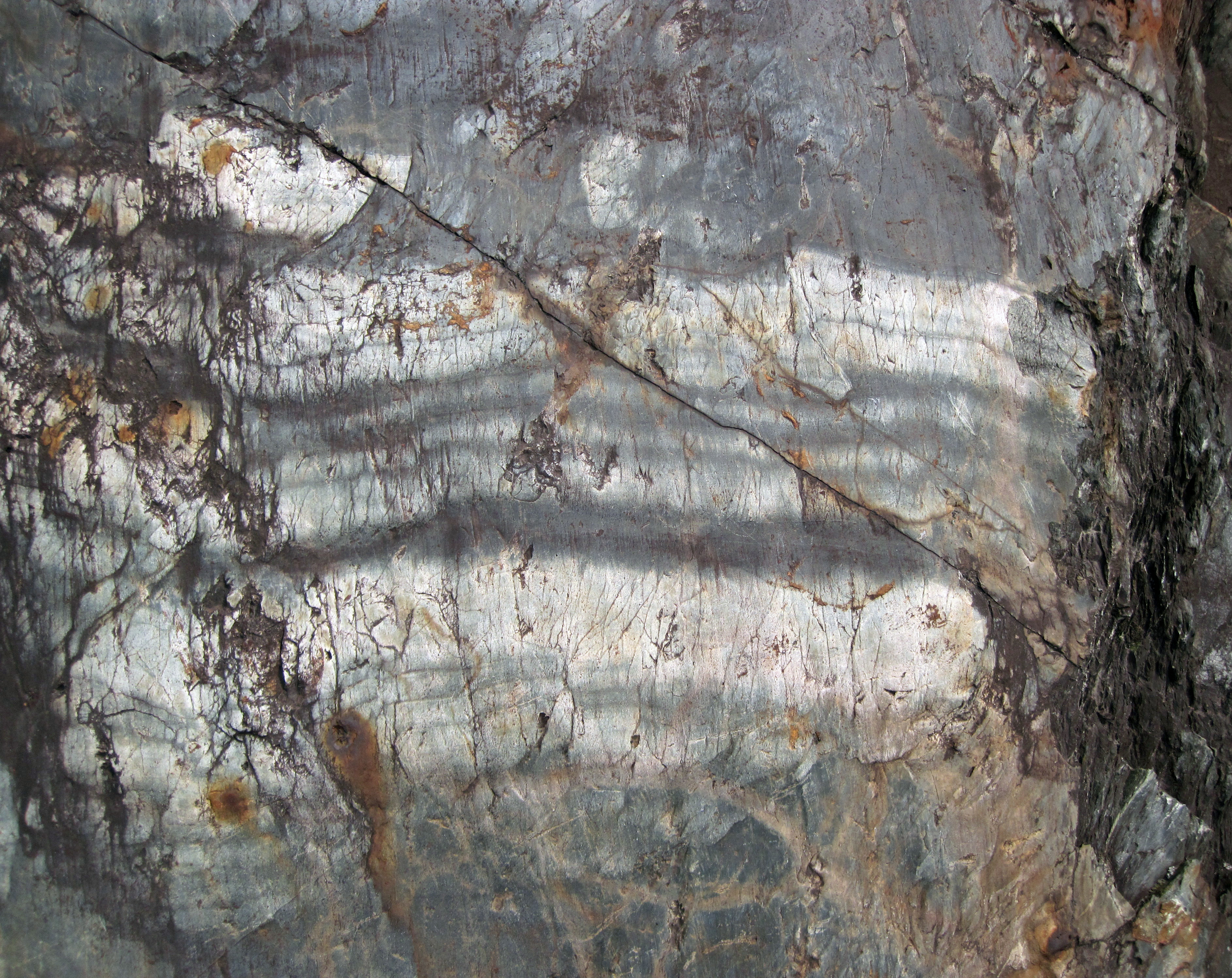
Interbedded graywacke-siltstone-slate in the Precambrian of Minnesota, USA. This is an outcrop of slightly metamorphosed rock that was smoothed and striated by glaciers during the Pleistocene Ice Age.

In geology, interbedding occurs when beds (layers of rock) of a particular lithology lie between or alternate with beds of a different lithology. For example, sedimentary rocks may be interbedded if there were sea level variations in their sedimentary depositional environment.

Intercalation is a special case of interbedding where a layer is variably inserted into an already existing sequence; or where two separate depositional environments in close spatial proximity migrate alternately across the contact.

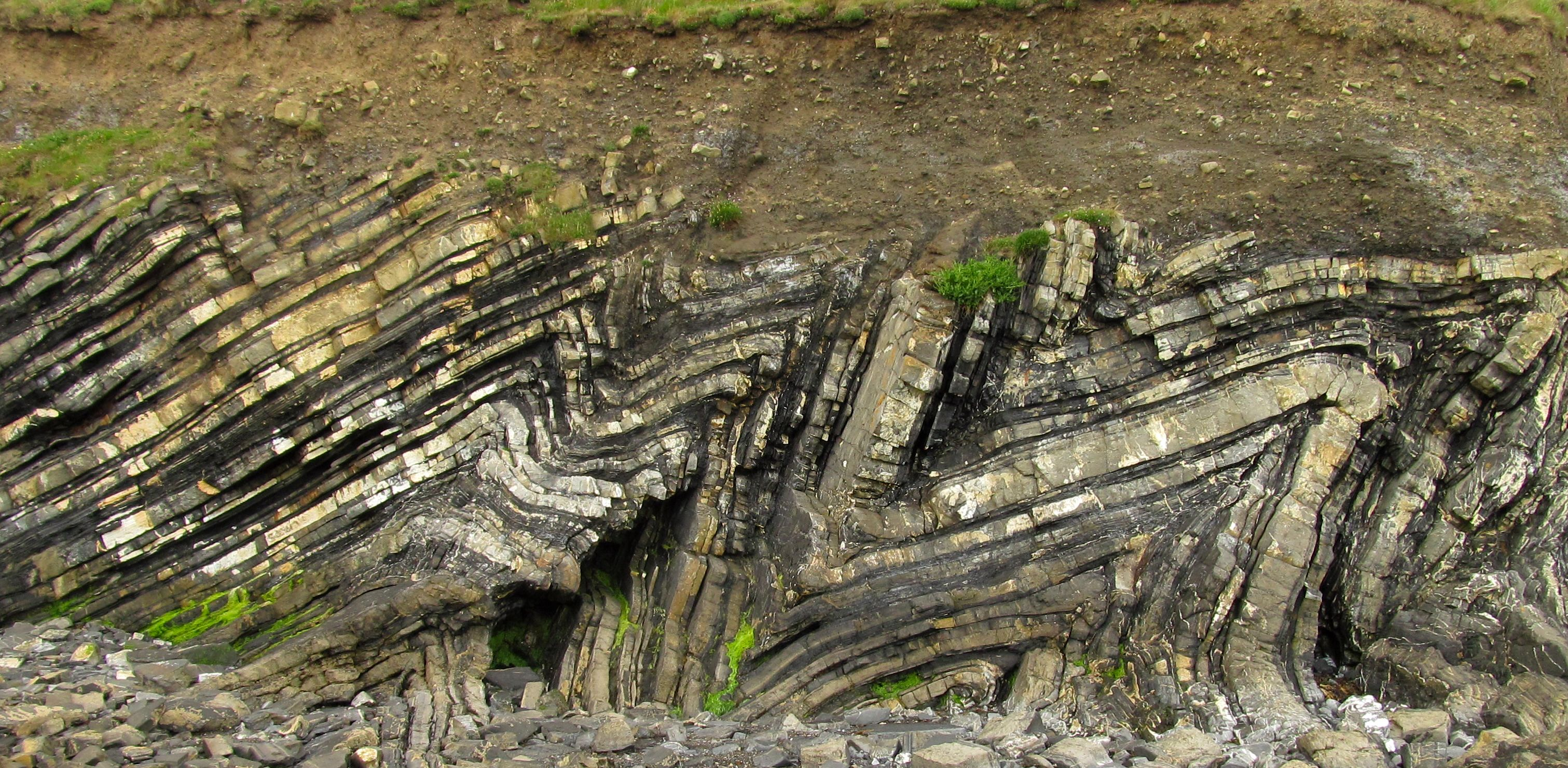
Folded sedimentary rocks (calcareous turbidite sequence) of Lower Carbonferous (Brigantian/Visean) age at Loughshinny, eastern coast of Ireland. The Variscan orogeny is responsible for the folding.

While interbedding has layers that are horizontally flat (or aligned with the angle of the entire stratum), intercalated rock on the other hand has slanted layers that streak through each other (even when it aligns with the stratum). For example, intercalated conglomerate and sandstone looks like ripples of different material networked through each other somewhat off the horizontal, as the beds are deposited in a gradient. This is likely due to differing fluvial conditions and gradual changes in sediment transport over time.

== Features ==
Typical alternation sequences include sequences of marl and limestone. In its most conspicuous form, such an interbedding as seen on a quarry wall can look like the stripes of a zebra: a dark gray marl layer, for example twenty centimeters thick, is followed by a half-meter-thick light limestone bench, which in turn is overlaid by a marl layer and this again by limestone and so on. Such evenly banded layers can consist of hundreds of alternating layers and can be several hundred meters thick.

Interbedding often reflects a cyclical change in sedimentation conditions. Lime-marl interbeddings represent the cyclical detachment of a high carbonate production due to the stronger influence of the terrestrial background sedimentation, which is usually attributed sedimentologically to an increase in sea depth and distance from the coast at the time of deposition at the corresponding deposit location. But these can cause alternations by recurring special events, such as the deposition of coarse turbidity current sediments on what would otherwise be a quiet and continuously running background sedimentation. For example, a river that sees regular interrupts in the form of flash floods.
