= Agglutinate (geology) =

In geology, agglutinate is pyroclastic rock consisting of volcanic bombs fused together by volcanic heat. It typically occurs in spatter cones but can also be rafted on lava flows to form mounds.

== See also ==
- Agglomerate
