= Mugearite =

Volcanic rock type

- Igneous rock
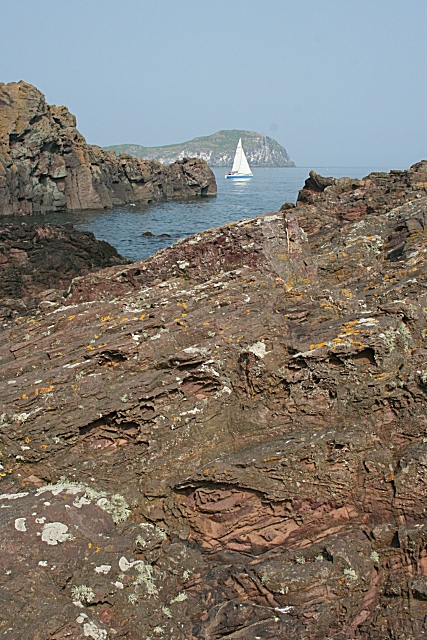
- Mugearite lava flow (on right); flow on left is hawaiite; at North Berwick, Scotland

Composition
- oligoclase, olivine

Mugearite (/ˈmʌɡiəraɪt/) is a type of oligoclase-bearing basalt, comprising olivine, apatite, and opaque oxides. The main feldspar in mugearite is oligoclase.

Mugearite is a sodium-rich member of the alkaline magma series. In the TAS classification of volcanic rock, mugearite is classified as sodium-rich basaltic trachyandesite.

== Examples ==
=== Western Scotland ===
Mugearite was first identified at Mugeary on the island of Skye, Scotland by Alfred Harker in 1904. Outcrops of mugearite also occur on the island of Mull. These examples of mugearite were formed during a period of continental flood basalt volcanic activity that happened in western Scotland during the Paleogene period of the Earth's geological history, when the North Atlantic Ocean opened between Europe and North America.

=== Oceanic islands ===
Mugearite has been erupted by the volcanoes of some oceanic islands at hotspots. Examples are Hawaii, Ascension Island, Saint Helena, Réunion, Mauritius and Tahiti.

=== Mars ===
Analysis of a Martian rock found by the Curiosity rover and named "Jake Matijevic" (or "Jake M"), after a NASA engineer, determined that this Martian rock is very similar to mugearite erupted on Earth.
