= Trachybasalt =

Volcanic rock

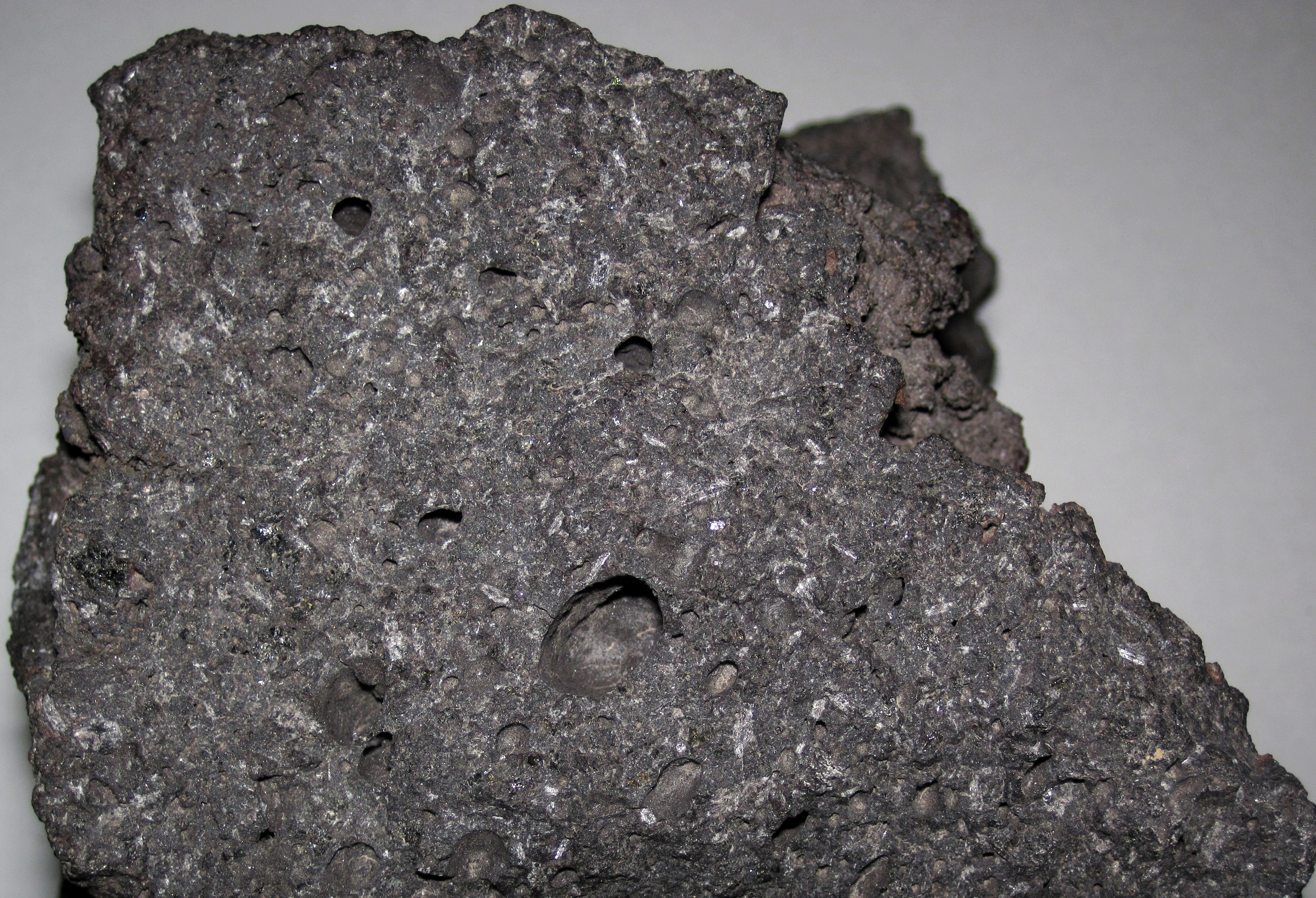
Potassic trachybasalt from the July–August 2001 eruption of Mount Etna, Italy

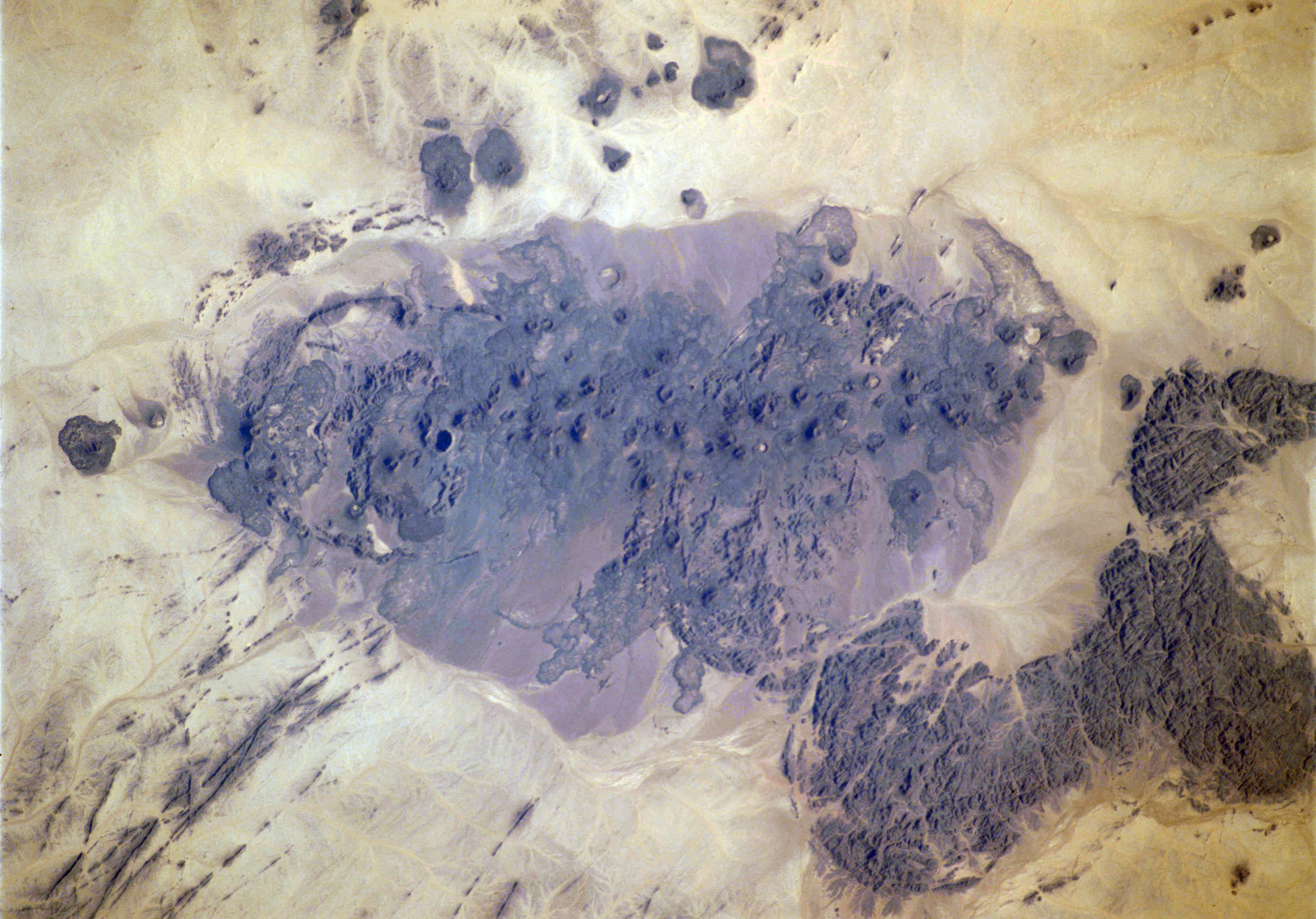
Satellite image of Bayuda volcanic field in Sudan where nepheline-rich trachybasalt lavas have been erupted during the Holocene epoch

Trachybasalt is a volcanic rock with a composition between trachyte and basalt. It resembles basalt but has a high content of alkali metal oxides. Minerals in trachybasalt include alkali feldspar, calcic plagioclase, olivine, clinopyroxene and likely very small amounts of leucite or analcime.

== Description ==
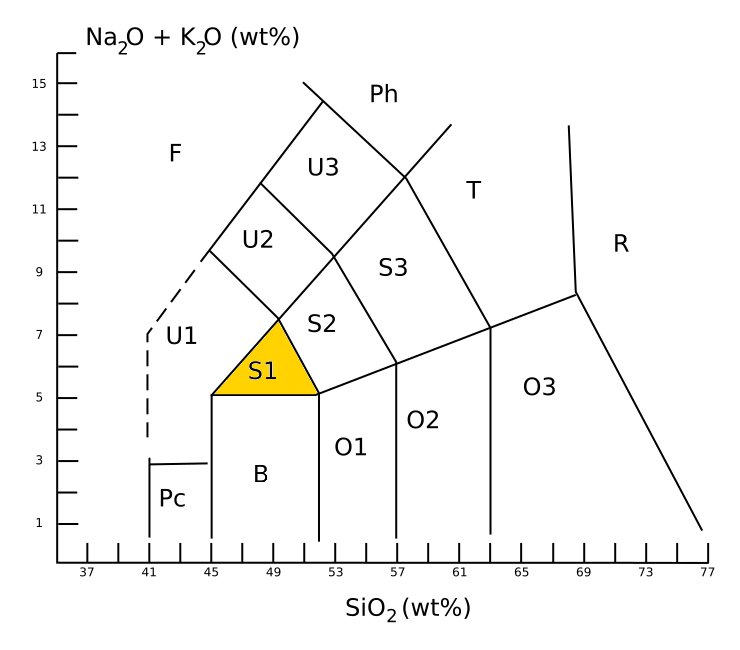
TAS diagram highlighting the trachybasalt field

An aphanitic (fine-grained) igneous rock is classified as trachybasalt when it has a silica content of about 49% and a total alkali metal oxide content of about 6%. This places trachybasalt in the S1 field of the TAS diagram. Trachybasalt is further divided into sodium-rich hawaiite and potassium-rich potassic trachybasalt, with wt% Na_{2}O > K_{2}O + 2 for hawaiite. The intrusive equivalent of trachybasalt is monzonite.

Trachybasalt is not defined on the QAPF diagram, which classifies crystalline igneous rock by its relative content of feldspars and quartz. However, the U.S. Geological Survey defines trachybasalt as a mafic volcanic rock (composed of over 35% mafic minerals) in which the quartz-feldspar-feldspathoid fraction of the rock is less than 20% quartz and less than 10% feldspathoid, and in which plagioclase is between 65% and 90% of the total feldspar content.

== Occurrence ==
Trachybasalt is common in continental volcanism and is also found on some ocean islands. It is abundant at Mount Etna and at Mount Taylor (New Mexico). It has also been found on Gale crater on the planet Mars.
