= Hawaiite =

Volcanic rock

Hawaiite is an olivine basalt with a composition between alkali basalt and mugearite. It was first used as a name for some lavas found on the island of Hawaii.

It occurs during the later stages of volcanic activity on oceanic islands such as Hawaii, which happens to be when the alkali metals are most present.

In gemology, hawaiite is a colloquial term for Hawaii-originated peridot, which is a gem-quality form of the mineral olivine.

== Description ==
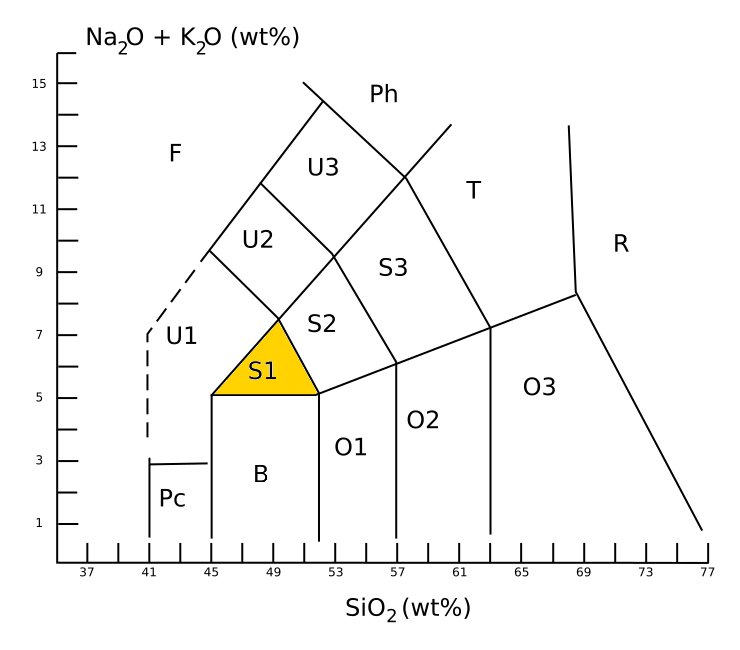
TAS diagram with trachybasalt field highlighted in yellow. Hawaiite is sodic trachybasalt.

Hawaiite is an aphanitic (fine-grained) volcanic rock produced by rapid cooling of lava moderately poor in silica and enriched in alkali metal oxides (potassium oxide plus sodium oxide). It is often impractical to determine the mineral composition of such a fine-grained rock, and so hawaiite is defined chemically. Under the TAS classification, hawaiite is sodic trachybasalt, with a silica content close to 49 wt%, a total alkali metal oxide content close to 6%, and Na_{2}O wt% > K_{2}O wt% + 2. This places hawaiite in the S1 field of the TAS diagram.

Hawaiite is not a recognized rock type in the QAPF classification of igneous rock, which is based on the relative proportions of quartz, alkali feldspar, and plagioclase in the mineral composition. However, hawaiite is composed mostly of andesine (plagioclase feldspar with an albite content of 50% to 70%) and pyroxene with smaller amounts of olivine. This would fall into the andesite/basalt field of the QAPF diagram.

== Occurrence ==
Hawaiite is erupted in the late stages of ocean island volcanism, forming part of the alkaline magma series characteristic of such eruptions. It is preceded by silica-poor ankaramite and followed by intermediate-silica mugearite as the magma evolves by crystallization in the underlying magma chamber. These rocks form an alkalic cap over the older rocks of the island. Hawaiite can occur at earlier stages in the evolution of some volcanoes in other tectonic settings, for example during the middle stage of volcanic activity in the Kekuknai volcanic massif (in Kamchatka, Russia) that formed in a volcanic back-arc basin.

Other settings in which hawaiite and other alkaline volcanic rocks are found include regions of continental extension, such as the Basin and Range Province of western North America and the Red Sea Rift.
