= Alkali basalt =

Type of volcanic rock

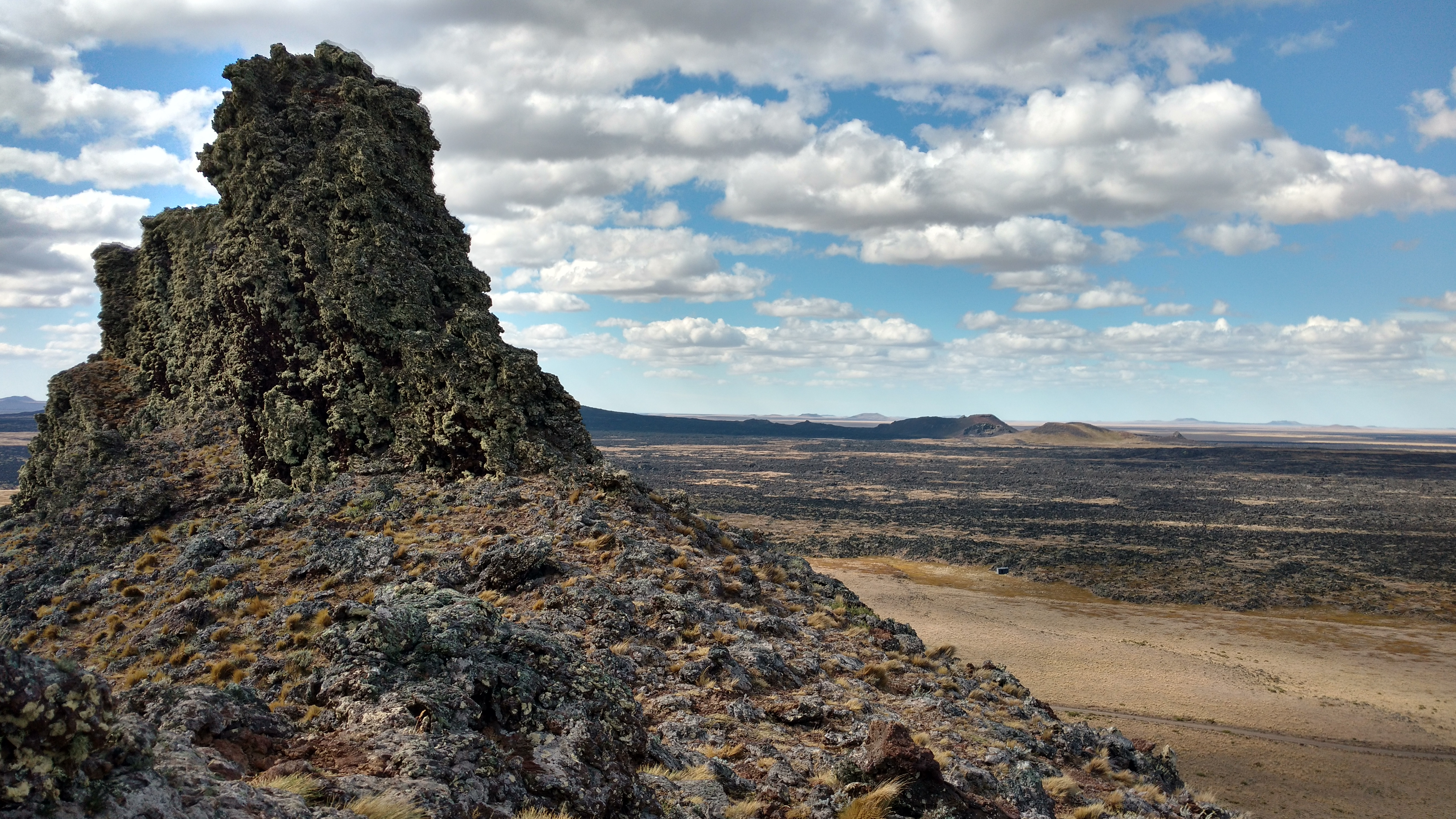
Alkali basalt is one of the rocks comprising the Pali-Aike volcanic field, in Argentina.

Alkali basalt or alkali olivine basalt is a dark-colored, porphyritic volcanic rock usually found in oceanic and continental areas associated with volcanic activity, such as oceanic islands, continental rifts and volcanic fields. Alkali basalt is characterized by relatively high alkali (Na_{2}O and K_{2}O) content relative to other basalts and by the presence of olivine and titanium-rich augite in its groundmass and phenocrysts, and nepheline in its CIPW norm.

== Geochemical characterization ==
Depiction of the total alkali-silica diagram. Alkali basalts are generally located in the upper left corner of the basalt region (region B).

Alkali basalt is chemically classified as a rock in region B (basalt) of the total alkali versus silica (TAS) diagram that contains nepheline in its CIPW norm. Basalts that do not contain normative nepheline are characterized as sub-alkali basalts, which include tholeiitic basalts and calc-alkaline basalts.

== Petrography ==
The groundmass of alkali basalt is mainly composed of olivine, titanium-rich augite and plagioclase feldspar and may have alkali feldspar or feldspathoid interstitially, but is poor in silica minerals, such as hypersthene and quartz.

Phenocrysts are ubiquitous in alkali basalt and, similarly to the groundmass, are usually made up of olivine and titanium-rich augite but can also have plagioclase and iron oxides with lower frequency.

== Geologic context ==
Alkali basalt can be found in areas associated with volcanic activity, such as oceanic islands (Hawaii, Madeira, Saint Helena, Ascension, etc.), continental rifts and volcanic fields. Continental alkali basalt can be found in every continent, with prominent examples being the Rio Grande Rift (USA), the East African Rift and the Pali-Aike volcanic field.

The results from the gamma ray spectrometer on Venera 8 on Venus suggest it landed on alkali basalt.
