= Latite =

Type of volcanic rock

- Volcanic rock
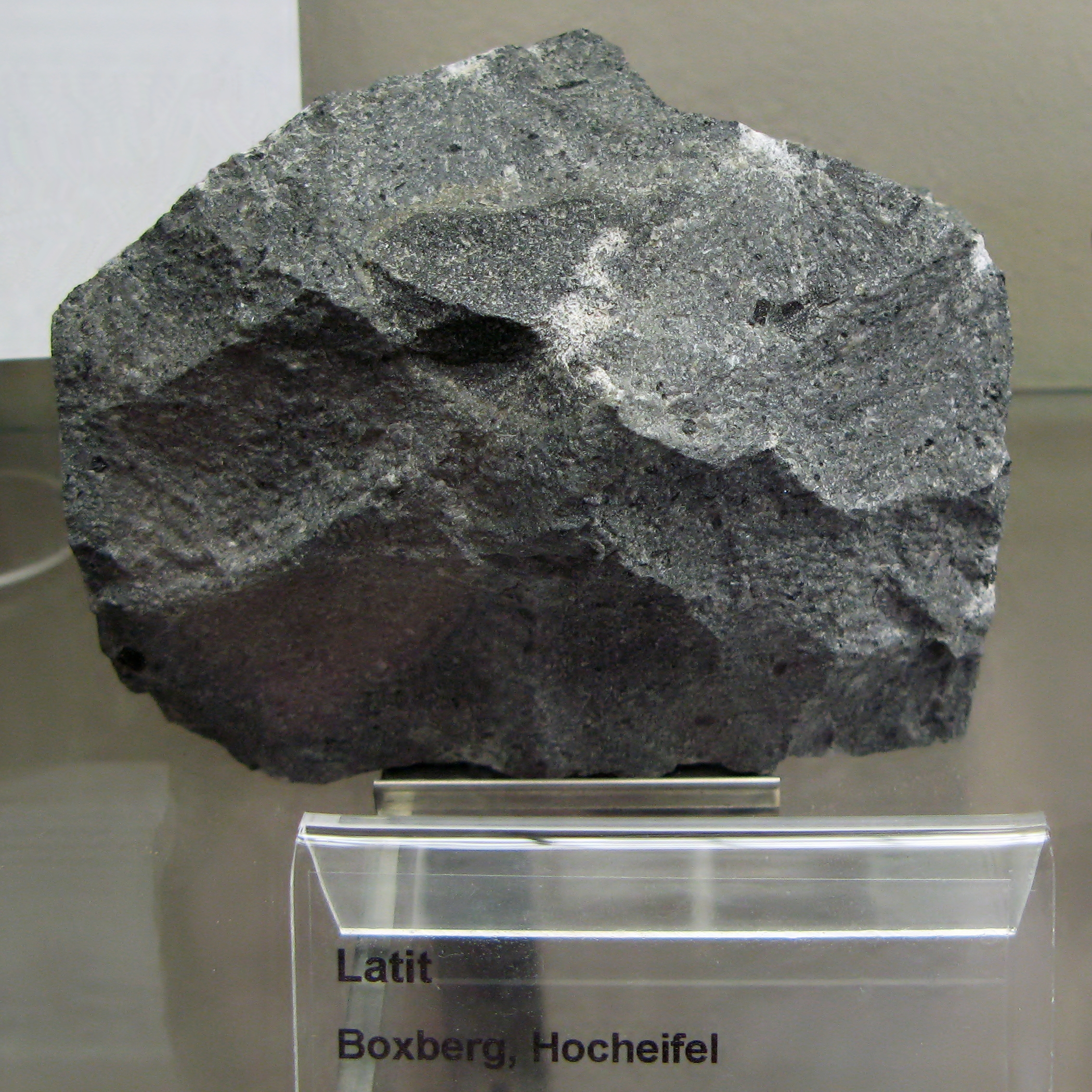

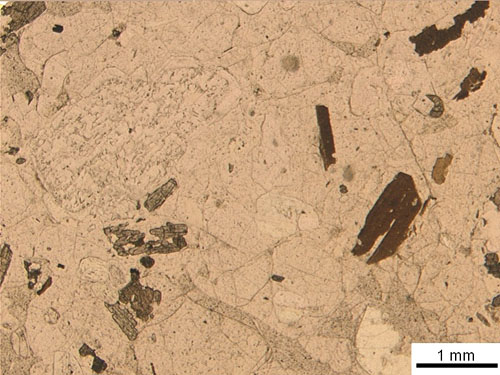
Photomicrograph of thin section of latite (in plane polarised light)

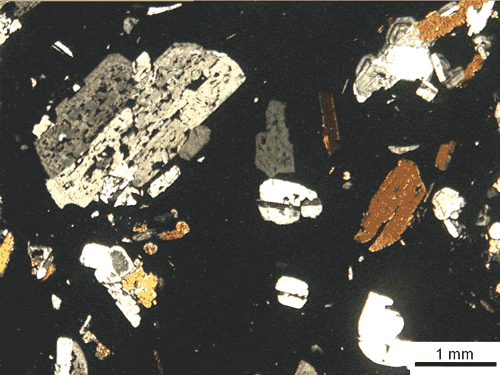
Photomicrograph of thin section of latite (in cross polarised light)

Latite is an igneous, volcanic rock, with aphanitic-aphyric to aphyric-porphyritic texture. It is the volcanic equivalent of monzonite. Its mineral assemblage is usually alkali feldspar and plagioclase in approximately equal amounts. Quartz is less than five percent and is absent in a feldspathoid-bearing latite, and olivine is absent in a quartz-bearing latite. When quartz content is greater than five percent the rock is classified as quartz latite. Biotite, hornblende, pyroxene and scarce olivine or quartz are common accessory minerals. Feldspathoid-bearing latite is sometimes referred to as tristanite.

Rhomb porphyries are an unusual variety with gray-white porphyritic, rhomb-shaped phenocrysts embedded in a very fine grained red-brown matrix. The composition of rhomb porphyry places it in the trachyte - latite classification of the QAPF diagram.

Latite is found, for example, as lavas in Bulgaria and as intrusive laccoliths and sills in South Dakota, US.

== See also ==
- Benmoreite
- List of rock types
- Porphyry
