= Big Raven =

Big Raven can refer to:

- Big Raven Formation, a geological formation in British Columbia, Canada
- Big Raven Plateau, a plateau in British Columbia, Canada
- Quikinna'qu, a deity of Siberian mythology
- Tse'sketco, a deity of Tahltan mythology
