= Elwyn Creek =

Elwyn Creek 14 Mile Creek
- Mouth of Elwyn Creek

Location
- Country: Canada
- Province: British Columbia
- District: Cassiar Land District

Physical characteristics
- Source: Mount Edziza
  - location: Big Raven Plateau
  - coordinates: 57°44′42″N 130°41′07″W
  - elevation: 2,030 m (6,660 ft)
- Mouth: Mess Creek
  - location: Tahltan Highland
  - coordinates: 57°47′16″N 130°59′30″W
  - elevation: 455 m (1,493 ft)
- Length: 25 km (16 mi)
- Basin size: 173 km^{2} (67 sq mi)
- Discharge
  - average: 3.34 m^{3}/s (118 cu ft/s)

Basin features
- Tributaries
  - left: Kadeya Creek
- Topo map: NTS 104G15 Buckley Lake

Elwyn Creek is a tributary of Mess Creek, which in turn is a tributary of the Stikine River in northwest part of the province of British Columbia, Canada. It flows generally west for about 25 km (16 mi) to join Mess Creek about 10 km (6.2 mi) north of Mess Creek's confluence with Taweh Creek. Elwyn Creek's watershed covers 173 km^{2} (67 sq mi) and its mean annual discharge is estimated at 3.34 m^{3}/s (118 cu ft/s). The mouth of Elwyn Creek is located about 16 km (9.9 mi) southeast of Telegraph Creek, about 60 km (37 mi) west-southwest of Iskut and about 93 km (58 mi) southwest of Dease Lake. Elwyn Creek's watershed's land cover is classified as 37.9% shrubland, 30.3% conifer forest, 15.2% barren, 7.6% snow/glacier, 7.1% herbaceous, and small amounts of other cover.

Elwyn Creek is in Mount Edziza Provincial Park which lies within the traditional territory of the Tahltan people.

== Geography ==
Elwyn Creek originates in the middle of the Big Raven Plateau. From its source on the northwestern slope of Mount Edziza, Elwyn Creek flows about 4 km (2.5 mi) northwest past Tsekone Ridge and Pillow Ridge to the head of a vegetated canyon. It then continues to flow northwest through the canyon for about 5 km (3.1 mi) before flowing west inside the canyon for an additional 12 km (7.5 mi) to empty into Mess Creek.

Elwyn Creek's only named tributary, Kadeya Creek, is about 10 km (6.2 mi) east of Elwyn Creek's confluence with Mess Creek. It is about 14 km (8.7 mi) long and flows northwest into Elwyn Creek from near the western side of Mount Edziza.

== Geology ==
Elwyn Creek contains a group of hot springs between elevations of 1,350 and 1,440 m (4,430 and 4,720 ft) called the Elwyn Hot Springs. They occur near the base of the Mount Edziza volcanic complex where basalt of the Nido Formation overlies Tertiary leucogranite. Thick deposits of tufa formed by the precipitation of calcite and aragonite occur at the Elwyn Hot Springs. In 1983, the springs had a maximum temperature of 36 °C (97 °F). Their existence may be linked to a shallow hydrothermal system driven by residual magmatic heat from the recently active Desolation Lava Field about 6 km (3.7 mi) to the east.

Elwyn Creek is the namesake of the Elwyn Creek Pluton. This is a body of intrusive rock at least 5 km (3.1 mi) wide exposed in Elwyn Creek canyon. The main intrusive rock comprising the Elwyn Creek Pluton is fine grained, slightly porphyritic leucogranite containing phenocrysts of sodic plagioclase. It is of Eocene age, having yielded a K–Ar date of 53.1 ± 2.4 million years. This suggests that the Elwyn Creek Pluton was formed by one of the youngest known igneous events in the Elwyn Creek area prior to the onset of volcanism of the Mount Edziza volcanic complex in the Late Miocene.

== History ==
The historic Yukon Telegraph Trail crosses Elwyn Creek in Mess Creek valley. It was built to serve the nearly 3,000 km-long (1,900 mi) Yukon Telegraph Line which was constructed by the Dominion Government Telegraph Service between 1897 and 1901 to send messages from Ashcroft, British Columbia in the south to Dawson City, Yukon in the north. The telegraph trail crosses other tributaries along the eastern side of Mess Creek, including Crayke Creek about 6 km (3.7 mi) south of Elwyn Creek.

Elwyn Creek was formerly called 14 Mile Creek which appeared on a BC Lands map published in 1929. Its current name was suggested by the BC Geographic Division to avoid duplication; it first appeared on maps in 1945. Elwyn Creek is named after Thomas Elwyn, a government agent who accompanied a Western Union Telegraph expedition in 1866.

== See also ==
- List of rivers of British Columbia
