= Kientz =

Kientz is a surname. Notable people with the surname include:

- Chris Kientz (born 1967), American/Canadian writer, animator, television producer, director, and educator
- Jochen Kientz (born 1972), German footballer
- Julie A. Kientz (born 1980), American computer scientist
