= Ku'urkil =

Chukchi creator-deity

Ku'urkil is the Chukchi creator-deity, roughly analogous to Bai-Ulgan of the Turkic pantheon. The Koryak refer to him as Quikinna'qu ("Big Raven") and in Kamchadal mythology he is called Kutkhu.

== See also ==
- Kutkh
