= Thomas Elwyn =

Canadian politician

Thomas Elwyn in 1885

Thomas Elwyn (c. 1837 – 11 September 1888) was a British soldier, police officer and gold commissioner in colonial British Columbia.

Elwyn was born in Ireland into a family with a long military tradition. He served as a lieutenant in the 30th Foot during the Crimean War. He arrived in Victoria on Christmas Day, 1858 and was appointed, on the strength of his references from England, to the police force under Inspector Chartres Brew. After serving for five months as the Chief Constable of Yale, Governor James Douglas made him Assistant Gold Commissioner of Lillooet. In 1861, he was put in charge of the Gold Escort from the Cariboo and Fraser Canyon goldfields. That venture was discontinued in 1862 when miners protested the government's inability to guarantee the safety of the gold being transported, and though revived again in 1863, again under Elwyn and despite his personal guarantee to the miners, its failure to generate revenue to offset costs resulted in its discontinuation.

Elwyn was appointed gold commissioner of the Cariboo on 21 April 1862. In October, he resigned, citing his interest in a valuable gold claim in the area. In 1864 he was part of the party sent by Brew to capture the Chilcotin Indians who killed a road crew on Bute Inlet in an incident known as the Chilcotin War. He spent the next year mining at Wild Horse Creek in the Kootenay, before setting off to represent the government on the expedition to extend the Western Union Telegraph line north from Quesnel. In 1868 he joined the Legislative Council, where he served for a single term. He took a short turn at driving cattle then signed aboard the HBC steamship Otter as purser. He was appointed deputy provincial secretary in 1877, a position he held until his death.

Elwyn Creek in northern British Columbia, Canada, is named after Thomas Elwyn.

== Sources ==
- Dorothy Blakey Smith "Elwyn, Thomas" at Dictionary of Canadian Biography Online, 2000
