= Crayke Creek =

Tribuatary river in the country of Canada

- Mouth of Crayke Creek

Location
- Country: Canada
- Province: British Columbia
- District: Cassiar Land District

Physical characteristics
- Source: West of Big Raven Plateau
  - location: Tahltan Highland
  - coordinates: 57°44′9″N 130°52′3″W
  - elevation: 1,340 m (4,400 ft)
- Mouth: Mess Creek
  - coordinates: 57°44′38″N 130°57′48″W
  - elevation: 507 m (1,663 ft)
- Length: 7 km (4.3 mi)
- Basin size: 15.3 km^{2} (5.9 sq mi)
- Discharge
  - average: 0.135 m^{3}/s (4.8 cu ft/s)

Basin features
- Topo map: NTS 104G10 Mount Edziza

Crayke Creek is a tributary of Mess Creek and part of the Stikine River watershed in northwest part of the province of British Columbia, Canada. It flows generally west for roughly 7 km (4.3 mi) to join Mess Creek, a tributary of the Stikine River.

Crayke Creek's mean annual discharge is estimated at 0.135 m^{3}/s (4.8 cu ft/s). Its watershed covers 15.3 km^{2} (5.9 sq mi) and is entirely in Mount Edziza Provincial Park. The watershed's land cover is classified as 78.4% conifer forest, 17.6% shrubland, 2.2% wetland, and small amounts of other cover.

The mouth of Crayke Creek is located about 21 km (13 mi) south of Telegraph Creek, British Columbia, about 95 km (59 mi) southwest of Dease Lake, British Columbia, and about 210 km (130 mi) southeast of Juneau, Alaska.

Crayke Creek is in Mount Edziza Provincial Park, which lies within the traditional territory of the Tahltan First Nation, of the Tahltan people.

== Geography ==
Crayke Creek originates on the lower slopes of the western side of the Big Raven Plateau, about 14 km (8.7 mi) west of the summit of Mount Edziza. From its source it flows west for about 7 km (4.3 mi) through wetlands and conifer forests before emptying into Mess Creek.

== History ==
Crayke Creek was officially named "Nigger Creek" in 1954, based on that name being used in the early 20th century. In 1967 the name was officially changed to Crayke Creek, after the Crayke family of Telegraph Creek. Mess Creek was the Crayke family trapline and John Crayke still had a trapline there in 1967.

== See also ==
- List of rivers of British Columbia
