= Kadeya Creek =

- Mouth of Kadeya Creek

Location
- Country: Canada
- Province: British Columbia
- District: Cassiar Land District

Physical characteristics
- Source: Mount Edziza
  - location: Big Raven Plateau
  - coordinates: 57°43′03″N 130°41′25″W
  - elevation: 2,040 m (6,690 ft)
- Mouth: Elwyn Creek
  - location: Tahltan Highland
  - coordinates: 57°48′10″N 130°51′54″W
  - elevation: 808 m (2,651 ft)
- Length: 17 km (11 mi)
- Basin size: 59 km^{2} (23 sq mi)
- Discharge
  - average: 1.22 m^{3}/s (43 cu ft/s)

Basin features
- Topo map: NTS 104G15 Buckley Lake

Kadeya Creek is a tributary of Elwyn Creek, which in turn is a tributary of Mess Creek, part of the Stikine River watershed in northwest part of the province of British Columbia, Canada. It flows generally northwest for roughly 17 km (11 mi) to join Elwyn Creek about 8 km (5.0 mi) east of Elwyn Creek's confluence with Mess Creek. Kadeya Creek's watershed covers 59 km^{2} (23 sq mi) and its estimated mean annual discharge is 1.22 m^{3}/s (43 cu ft/s). The mouth of Kadeya Creek is located about 21 km (13 mi) southeast of Telegraph Creek, about 52 km (32 mi) west of Iskut and about 87 km (54 mi) southwest of Dease Lake. Kadeya Creek's watershed's land cover is classified as 48.8% shrubland, 18.2% conifer forest, 11.7% barren, 10.9% herbaceous, 8.8% snow/glacier, and small amounts of other cover.

Kadeya Creek is in Mount Edziza Provincial Park which lies within the traditional territory of the Tahltan people.

== Geography ==
Kadeya Creek originates in the middle of the Big Raven Plateau. From its source near Triangle Dome on the western slope of Mount Edziza, Kadeya Creek flows about 6 km (3.7 mi) northwest to the head of a vegetated canyon. It then continues to flow northwest through the canyon for about 4 km (2.5 mi) before flowing north-northwest inside the canyon for an additional 7 km (4.3 mi) to empty into Elwyn Creek.

== Geology ==
Kadeya Creek canyon contains as much as 300 m (980 ft) of gently tilted Cretaceous strata of the Sustut Group. This strata, consisting of interbedded siltstone, sandstone, shale and conglomerate, is overlain by basal lavas of the Mount Edziza volcanic complex. Thin seams of coal, carbonizd stems and plant debris occur locally.

== History ==
In 1956, one of Canadian volcanologist Jack Souther's assistants got lost by mistakenly following the wrong tributary of Kadeya Creek. This resulted in them failing to show up at a camp, precipitating a helicopter search for the lost individual. Kadeya Creek was officially named after this incident in 1980; Kadeya means "go after" or "in search of" in the Tahltan language.

== See also ==
- List of rivers of British Columbia
