= Kutkh =

Raven spirit revered by various indigenous peoples of far eastern Russia

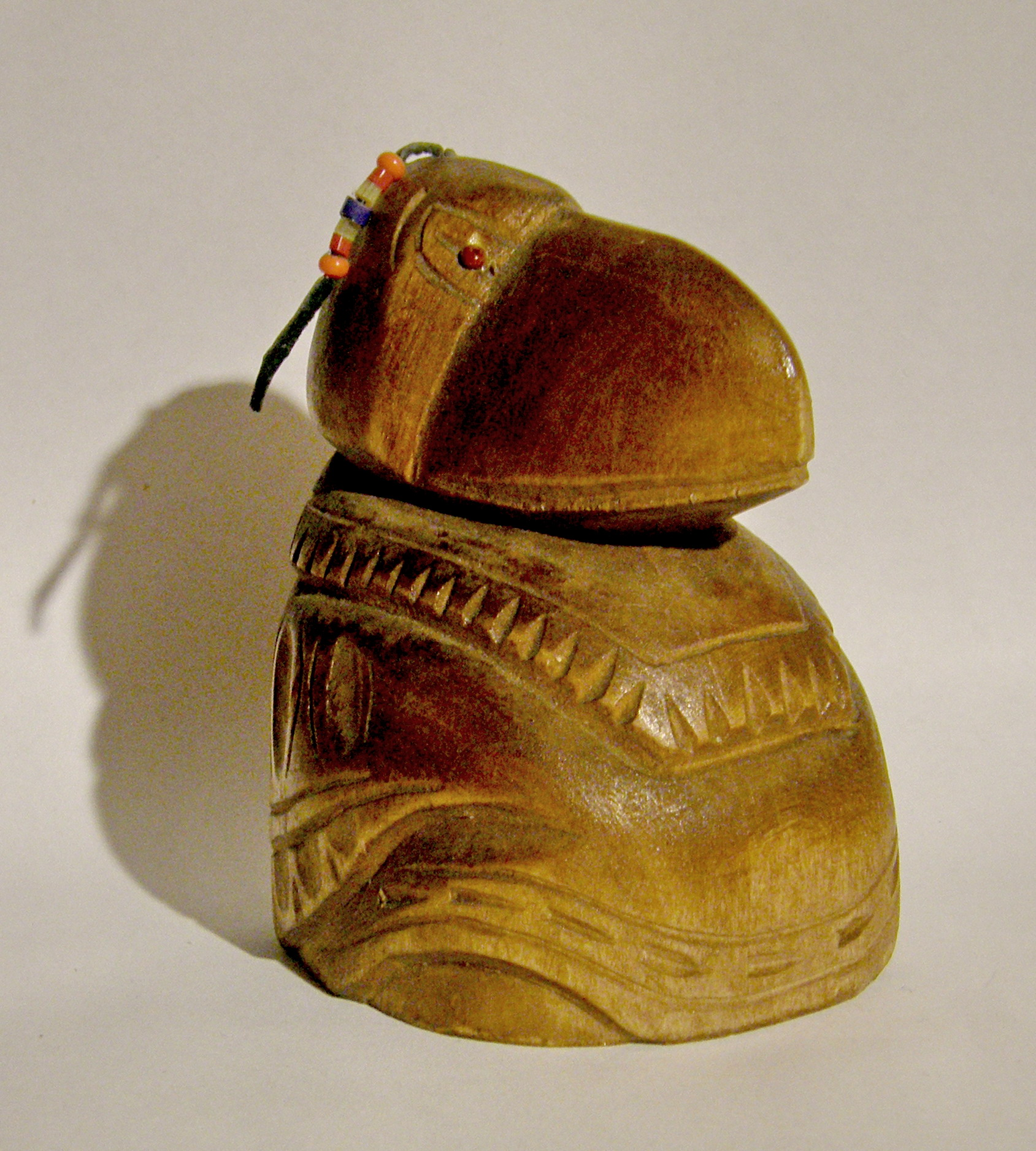
Wooden carving of Kutkh made by Koryak artisans in Kamchatka

Kutkh (also Kutkha, Kootkha, Kutq, Kutcha and other variants, Russian: Кутх) is a Raven spirit traditionally revered in various forms by various indigenous peoples of the Russian Far East. Kutkh appears in many legends: as a key figure in creation, as a fertile ancestor of mankind, as a mighty shaman and as a trickster. He is a popular subject of the animist stories of the Chukchi people and plays a central role in the mythology of the Koryaks and Itelmens of Kamchatka. Many of the stories regarding Kutkh are similar to those of the Raven among the indigenous peoples of the Pacific Northwest Coast, suggesting a long history of indirect cultural contact between Asian and North American peoples.

== Names ==
Kutkh is known widely among the people that share a common Chukotko-Kamchatkan language family. Regionally, he is known as Kúrkil among the Chukchi; as Kutq among the Itelmens; and as KútqI, KútqIy, or KúsqIy among the southeastern Koryaks and KúykIy or QúykIy among the northwestern Koryaks.

In Koryak, the name is employed commonly in its augmentative form, (KutqÍnnaku, KusqÍnnaku, KuyÍnnaku) all meaning "Big Kutkh" and often translated simply as "God".

== Myths ==
The tales of Kutkh come in many, often contradictory versions. In some tales he is explicitly created by a Creator and lets the dawn onto the earth by chipping away at the stones surrounding her. In others he creates himself (sometimes out of an old fur coat) and takes pride in his independence from the Creator. In some, Kamchatka is created as he drops a feather while flying over the earth. In others, islands and continents are created by his defecation, rivers and lakes out of his waters. The difficult volcanic terrain and swift rivers of Kamchatka are thought to reflect Kutkh's capricious and willful nature.

The bringing of light in the form of the sun and the moon is a common theme. Sometimes, he tricks an evil spirit which has captured the celestial bodies much in the style of analogous legends about the Tlingit and Haida in the Pacific Northwest. In others, it is he who must be tricked into releasing the sun and the moon from his bill.

Kutkh's virility is emphasized in many legends. Many myths concern his children copulating with other animal spirits and creating the peoples that populate the world.

In the animistic tradition of north-Eurasian peoples, Kutkh has a variety of interactions and altercations with Wolf, Fox, Bear, Wolverine, Mouse, Owl, Dog, Seal, Walrus and a host of other spirits. Many of these interactions involve some sort of trickery in which Kutkh comes out on top about as often as he is made a fool of.

An example of these contradictions is given to the Chukchi legend of Kutkh and the Mice. The great and mighty raven Kutkh was flying through the cosmos. Tired from constant flight, he regurgitated the Earth from his gut, transformed into an old man, and alighted on the empty land to rest. Out of his first footsteps emerged the first Mice. Curious, playful and fearless, they entered the sleeping Kutkh's nose. The fury of the subsequent sneeze buckled the earth and created the mountains and the valleys. Attempts to stamp them out led to the formation of the ocean. Further harassments led to a great battle between the forces of snow and fire which created the seasons. Thus, the variable world recognizable to people emerged from the dynamic interaction between the mighty Kutkh and the small but numerous Mice.

== Attitudes ==
Although Kutkh is supposed to have given mankind variously light, fire, language, fresh water and skills such as net-weaving and copulation, he is also often portrayed as a laughing-stock, hungry, thieving and selfish. In its contradictions, his character is similar that of other trickster gods, such as Coyote.

The early Russian explorer and ethnographer of Kamchatka Stepan Krasheninnikov (1711–1755) summarizes the Itelmen's relationship to Kutkh as follows:

They pay no homage to him and never ask any favor of him; they speak of him only in derision. They tell such indecent stories about him that I would be embarrassed to repeat them. They upbraid him for having made too many mountains, precipices, reefs, sand banks and swift rivers, for causing rainstorms and tempests which frequently inconvenience them. In winter when they climb up or down the mountains, they heap abuses on him and curse him with imprecations. They behave the same way when they are in other difficult or dangerous situations.

The image of Kutkh remains popular and iconic in Kamchatka, used often in advertising and promotional materials. Stylized carvings of Kutkh by Koryak artisans, often adorned with beads and lined with fur, are sold widely as souvenirs.

The Chukchi creator-deity, roughly analogous to Bai-Ulgan of the Turkic pantheon. The Koryaks refer to him as Quikinna'qu ("Big Raven") and in Kamchadal (Itelmens) mythology he is called Kutkhu.

== See also ==
- Cultural depictions of ravens
- Raven Tales
