= Volcanic plateau =

Plateau produced by volcanic activity

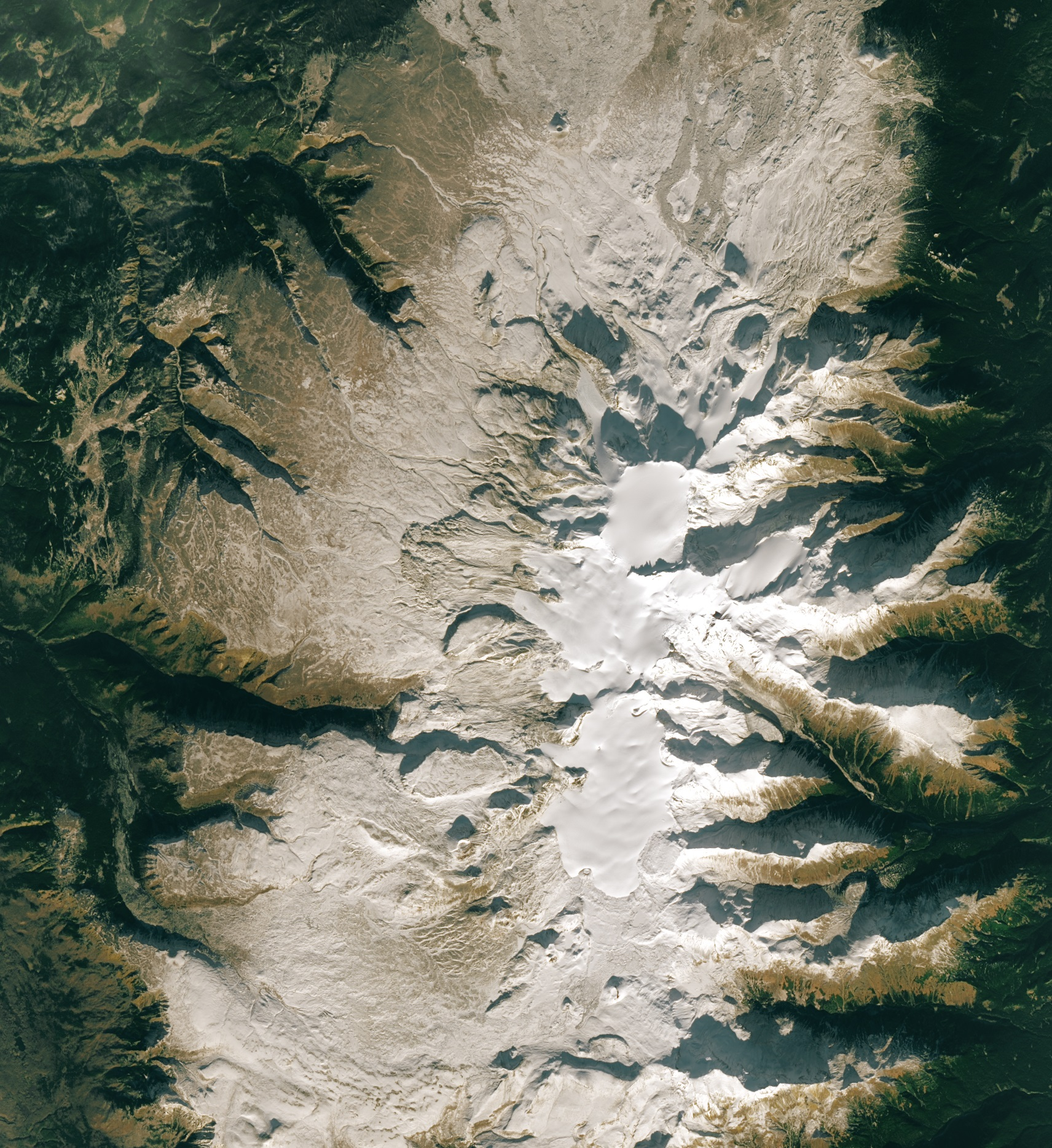
Satellite image of the Big Raven Plateau in British Columbia, Canada

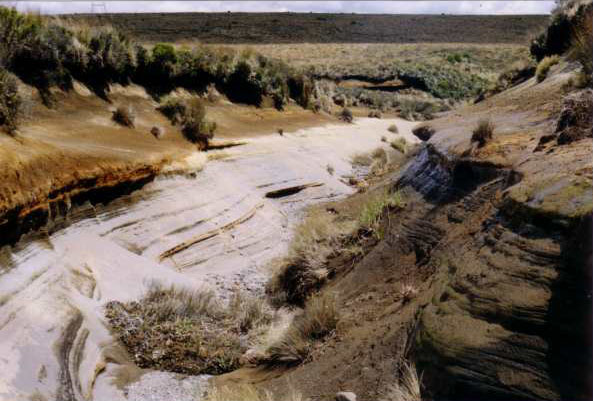
Rangipo Desert of the North Island Volcanic Plateau. Numerous tephra layers are visible.

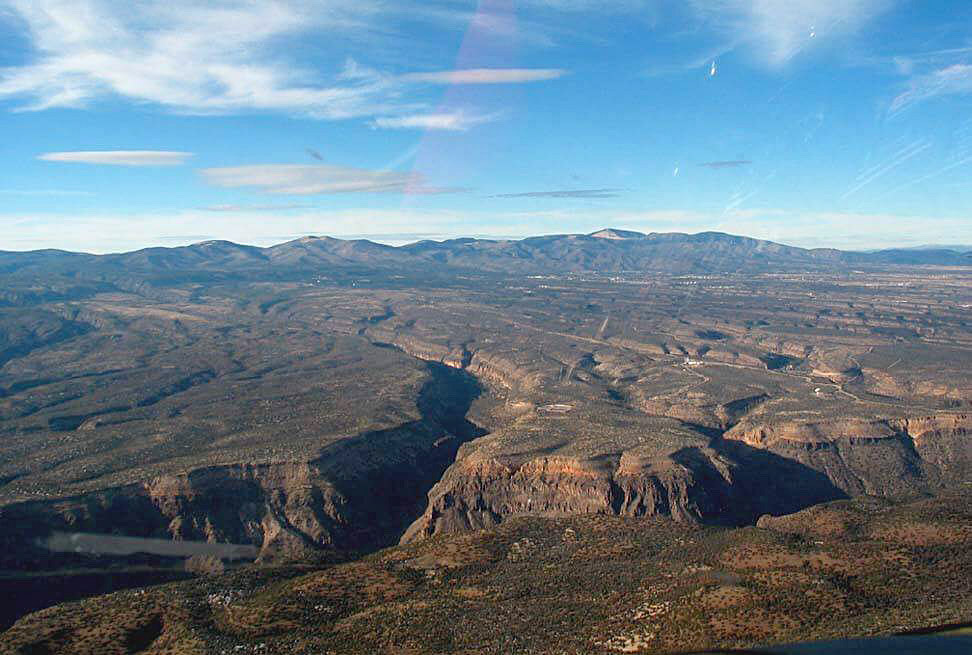
The Pajarito Plateau in New Mexico, United States is an example of a volcanic plateau

A volcanic plateau is a plateau produced by volcanic activity. There are two main types: lava plateaus and pyroclastic plateaus.

== Lava plateau ==
Lava plateaus are formed by highly fluid basaltic lava during numerous successive eruptions through numerous vents without violent explosions (quiet eruptions). These eruptions are quiet because of the low viscosity of the lava and the small amount of trapped gases. The resulting sheet lava flows may be extruded from linear fissures or rifts or gigantic volcanic eruptions through multiple vents characteristic of the prehistoric era which produced giant flood basalts. Multiple successive and extensive lava flows cover the original landscape to eventually form a plateau, which may contain lava fields, cinder cones, shield volcanoes and other volcanic landforms. In some cases, a lava plateau may be part of a single volcano. An example is the massive Level Mountain shield volcano in northern British Columbia, Canada, which covers an area of 1,800 km^{2} (690 mi^{2}) and a volume of 860 km^{3} (210 mi^{3}).

Perhaps the most extensive of all the subaerial basaltic plateaus existed during the Paleogene and possibly extended over 1,800,000 km^{2} (690,000 sq mi) of the northern Atlantic Ocean region. This region, known as the Thulean Plateau, is generally believed to have been broken up by the foundering of the Earth's crust to form the present ocean basin.

Earth features numerous subaerial and submarine volcanic plateaus, such as the Columbia River Plateau (subaerial) and the vast Ontong Java Plateau (submarine).

== Pyroclastic plateau ==
Pyroclastic plateaus are produced by massive pyroclastic flows. They are underlain by pyroclastic rocks: agglomerates, tephra, volcanic ashes cemented into tuffs, mafic or felsic. Pyroclastic plateaus are also called ignimbrite plateaus.

Examples include the Shirasu-Daichi, which makes up almost all of southern Kyūshū, Japan, and the North Island Volcanic Plateau in New Zealand.

== See also ==
- Lava field – Large, mostly flat area of lava flows
- Cézallier Massif – Volcanic plateau from France
