= Ravens in Native American mythology =

Traditional creation stories of indigenous peoples of North America

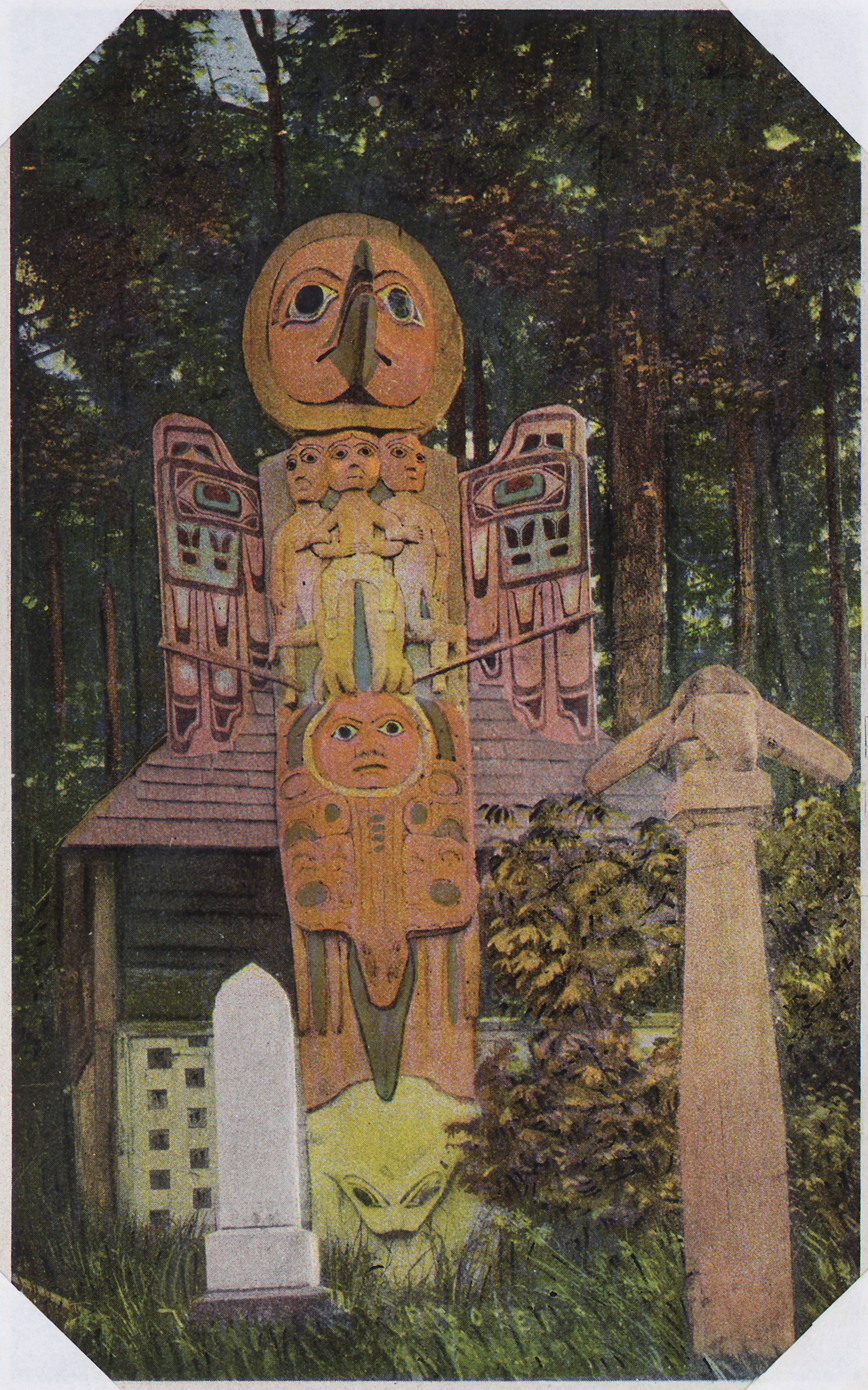
The Raven sits on a frog after having rescued children from a flood.

Raven Tales are the traditional human and animal creation stories of the indigenous peoples of the Pacific Northwest Coast. They are also found among Athabaskan-speaking peoples and others. Raven stories exist in nearly all of the First Nations throughout the region but are most prominent in the tales of the Haida, Tsimshian, Tlingit and Tahltan people.

Raven and eagle are known by many different names by many different peoples and are important figures among written and verbal stories. Raven's tales are passed down through the generations of story tellers of the people and are of cultural and historical significance. From some storytellers' perspective, indigenous myths such as the Raven Tales, as opposed to tall tales and little stories for children, are not entertainment and can be the cultural property of the clan or individual that the story originates from. It is customary that others should not tell stories that are owned by another clan without their permission, and efforts should be taken to learn whether or not a particular story is owned before sharing it.

While each culture's stories of the Raven are different, there are even those that share the same title; certain attributes of Raven remain the same. The Raven is always a magical creature able to take the form of human, animal, even inanimate objects. He is a keeper of secrets, and a trickster often focused on satisfying his own gluttony for whatever he desires. His stories tell of how worldly things came to be or offer suggestion to children on how to behave. Raven's creative nature shows itself through circumstance rather than intent, through the desire to satisfy his own needs, rather than any altruistic principles. Raven is both the protagonist among the stories of some groups, and the antagonist of others; he is a hero and an amusement.

Tales that feature the Raven as the hero are specific to areas in the north of the continent such as northern British Columbia and Alaska and their peoples, such as the Tsimshian and the Haida. Similar tales about Kutkh appear in Chukchi cultures in the north-east of Asia and it is probable that they are influenced by Native American stories.

The Haida people credit Raven with finding the first humans hiding in a clam shell; he brought them berries and salmon. The Sioux tell of how a white raven used to warn buffalo of approaching hunters. Eventually an angry hunter caught the bird and threw it into a fire, turning it black.

== Common features ==
While Raven tales tell the origins of human beings, they do not address the origins of organized society. In tales which mirror development and organization of Native American societies, the hero is often humanity itself. Raven tales do not offer a detailed picture about the social relations and realities of life.

== Traditional myths ==
=== Athabaskan ===
Athabaskan is the language family of several contiguous dialects spoken by various peoples in Western Canada and the American West. They can be further subdivided into the Northern, Pacific Coast, and Southern Athabaskan language sub regions.

These groups lived in one of the three Athabaskan regions.

==== Cahto ====
The Cahto are an indigenous Californian group of Native Americans. The Cahto lived farthest south of all the Athapascans in California, occupying Cahto Valley and Long Valley, and in general the country south of Blue Rock and between the headwaters of the two main branches of Eel River. The Cahto language is one of four Athabaskan languages that were spoken in northwestern California. Most Cahto speakers were also bilingual in Northern Pomo.

===== Creation story =====
One version of the Raven creation story is that of the Cahto in California. In one variant, Raven is taught by his father, Kit-ka'ositiyi-qa, to be a creator, but Raven is unsatisfied with the result. He creates the world but is unable to give it light or water. On hearing that light could be found hidden in a far-off land, Raven decides to travel there and steal it. In the house of light, he finds a young woman living with her father and plays the first of many tricks. He turns himself into a speck of dirt, slips into her drinking water, and is swallowed. The daughter becomes pregnant and she gave birth to an unusual and fussy child who cries constantly and demands to touch one of the bundles which has been stored hanging from the walls. The child is given one of the bags to quiet him, but when he tires of playing with it, he lets it go, and it floats away from him and disappears through the smoke hole. Once it reaches the sky the bundle comes undone and scatters stars across the sky. When the child cries to have it back again he is given the second bundle to play with and lets it float away through the hole in the ceiling, thus releasing the moon. It all happens again with the third and last bundle, which flies away and becomes sunlight. After bringing light to the whole world, Raven too flies out through the smoke hole.

==== Tahltan ====
Locally among the Tahltan people, their customs and livelihoods varied widely as they were often widely separated and would have to endure varying conditions depending on their locality. In Tahltan culture it was believed that some of their ancestors had knowledge that others did not from times before a great flood. Some of these ancestors used that knowledge for the good of the people, while others used it for evil and to the disadvantage of others. Raven is considered to be the protagonist hero against these evil ancestors.

In Tahltan stories, Raven is referred to as Big-Crow (Tse'sketco or tceski'tco, "big raven" - from tceski'a, "raven").

===== The Birth of Raven =====
The Tahltan claim that Big-Crow was born miraculously as the youngest of many brothers in the northern Tlingit country and was raised speaking the local language. He was separated from his father at birth and his father is never spoken of in all of their stories. Raven was born, the third child of a woman whose previous two boys were killed by her uncle. Each time the woman gave birth, her uncle would offer to teach them to hunt once they were old enough; each time he would take them out on a canoe and trick them, he would instruct the boys to sit on the edge of the canoe, at which point he would rock the canoe, forcing them to fall into the water where he would leave them to drown.

But her third child was Raven who took well to carving. Just as he'd done twice before, her uncle asked if he could teach Raven how to hunt after he'd grown a few years. Several times she refused her uncle until Raven insisted that she allow him to go. So they went out to sea and the same scenario played out. Raven fell into the water but rather than drown, he took one of the toy canoes he had carved and made it grow into a full size canoe. He went straight back to his mother and told of what his uncle had done.

Twice more the uncle tried to drown Raven in the same manner but Raven outsmarted him each time until the uncle gave up and no longer took Raven hunting but would go alone.

As Raven grew into a man, he met the uncle's wife where he tried to play with her. He tickled the girl and two birds flew out from under her arms, a blue jay and a woodpecker; and the girl died. When the uncle returned from his hunt, he saw that his wife had died and he intended to kill Raven again, but this time in rage rather than trickery. But once again, Raven escaped with his canoe carvings. But when Raven escaped this time, he did not return home and his journey began; never to return to his home.

He starting off travelling by canoe along the seashore all alone but would stop whenever he came upon a village. When he met people whom he saw take advantage of others or use their power for evil, he would kill in his efforts to deprive them of power.

Raven travelled for many years along the coast of the Tlingit territory, first travelling south, having started in the north until he had gone so far south, beyond Tlingit territory until he reached the Mink people at which point he turned around and continued back the other direction. He did this north south, south north journey for several years. Not until his work along the coast was done, did he head inland along the Stikine River all the way to its source. He also travelled along the Nass, Skeena, and Taku rivers and all of their many streams, never staying in one place for very long and never travelling far off from the water ways. Through his inland journeys he met the Kaska Dene, the Haida, and other nations to the east.

Later in life, when Raven had done all the work he could do, he travelled back out to the coastal regions guided by the setting sun until he disappeared mysteriously. The only suggestion is that he may have gone to live with the Kanu'gu and other ancient gods on an island far out into the ocean where they believed weather was created from.

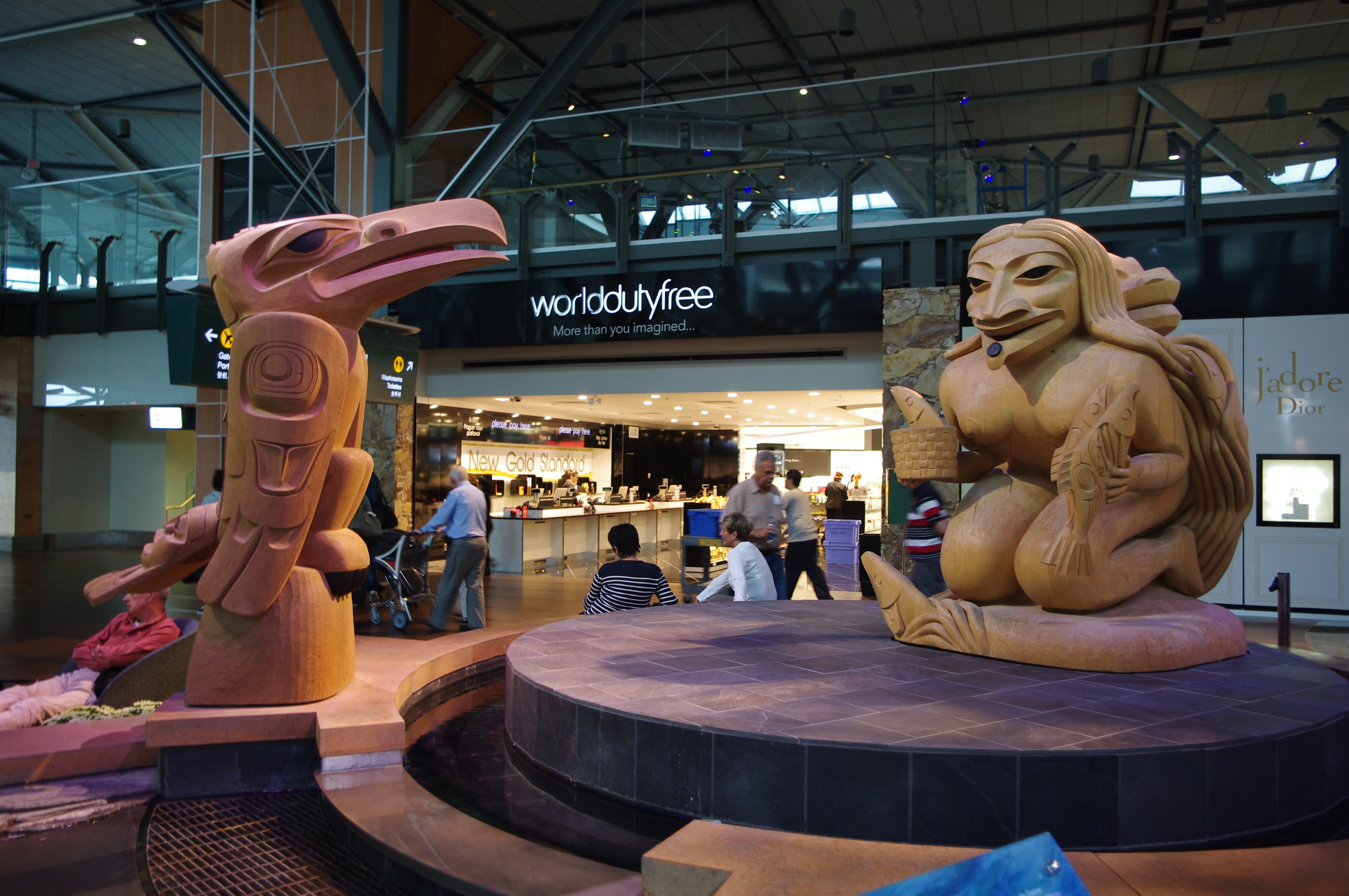
Dempsey Bob's The Story of Fog Woman and Raven, exhibited at Vancouver International Airport, tells how Raven's greed resulted in salmon run.

As the Raven stories continue after "The Birth of Raven", many stories follow:

1. "Origin of the Tides"
2. "Origin of Fresh Water"
3. "Origin of Olachen"
4. "Origin of Daylight"
5. "Raven and the Salmon"
6. "Raven Creates the Salmon and Teaches the People"
7. "Raven Institutes Birth and Death"
8. "Raven and the Grizzly-Bear"
9. "Raven Paints the Bird"
10. "Raven Paints his Men for War"
11. "The Tree Eats the Bear"
12. "Raven Kills Pitch-Man"
13. "Raven and His Sister"
14. "Raven Tries to Marry a Princess"
15. "Raven in the Country of the Tahltan"
16. "Raven and Kanu'gu"
17. "Raven and the Haida"
18. "Raven Institutes the Kuwega'n Ceremonies"
19. "Raven Makes the Wolf Women Good-Looking"
20. "Raven Considers how to Provide for the People"
21. "The Origin of Birth and Death"
22. "Raven Curtails the Powers of Game"
23. "Raven Steals Fire"
24. "Raven Ballasts the Earth"
25. "Raven Makes Lakes"
26. "Raven Makes Mud"
27. "Raven Creates Bear"
28. "Raven and Bear-Man"
29. "Raven and E'dista or Big-Toad"
30. "Raven and Rabbit-Man Kextsaza"
31. "Raven and Crow"
32. "Raven and His Blanket"
33. "Raven Loses his Nose"
34. "Raven and the Ghosts"
35. "Raven and Porcupine Make the Seasons"

Raven appears in other stories not directly related to him as well. In the story of the 'Warm and Cold Wind People' it is said that someone, possibly Raven, ordained that the people send out the winds.

He appears again in the story of "The Great Flood", which accounts for the killing of the evil ancestors who used their powers to take away the sun, moon, and Dipper which were lost during the flood.

==== Northern Athabaskan ====
1. "Great Raven Makes The World"
2. "Raven Steals The Light"
3. "When Raven Was Killed"
4. "How Raven Killed The Whale"
5. "Raven and Mink"
6. "Raven Lost His Eyes"
7. "Raven and Goose-Wife"

=== Inuit ===
The Inuit (formerly Eskimo, now a discredited term) are native to Alaska, Northern Canada and Greenland. In Inuit culture the owl, fish, and raven are of greatest prominence. Ravens are also common in the Inuit artwork and they have several stories that tell of Raven's birth which is often juxtaposed with the owl with whom Raven shared a deep friendship.

The Inuit say that Raven was born out of the darkness. He was weak and lost. As he began travelling aimlessly experiencing the world, he realized that he was the Raven Father, Creator of All Life. Once he realized who he was, he gathered up his strength and flew out of the darkness to a new place which he called earth, but he was still alone, so he decided to create plants. As he flew around exploring this new world, he came upon a man whom the legend claims was the first of the Inuit. Raven fed the man and taught the man to respect the world around him. Soon after, a woman came to be and Raven taught the both of them how to cloth themselves, build shelter, and make canoes to travel the water. As the two bred and spawned children, Raven cared for their children and educated them as he had done before.

1. "Inuit Story of Owl and Raven"
2. "Raven's Great Adventure"
3. Owl Paints the Raven by Ningeokuluk Teevee

==== Aleuts ====
Stories from the Aleut peoples include:

1. "Princess Raven"
2. "Raven and His Grandmother"
3. "Raven's Great Adventure"

==== Cup'ik (Yupik) ====
Raven is known as Tulukaruq to the Yupik peoples and is seen as a benevolent culture hero who helps the people.

1. "Raven Seeks A Wife"
2. "Raven and Goose-Wife"
3. Ellagpiim Yua
4. "Raven's Daughter"
5. "How The Owl Got Its Grey Spots"

=== Haida ===
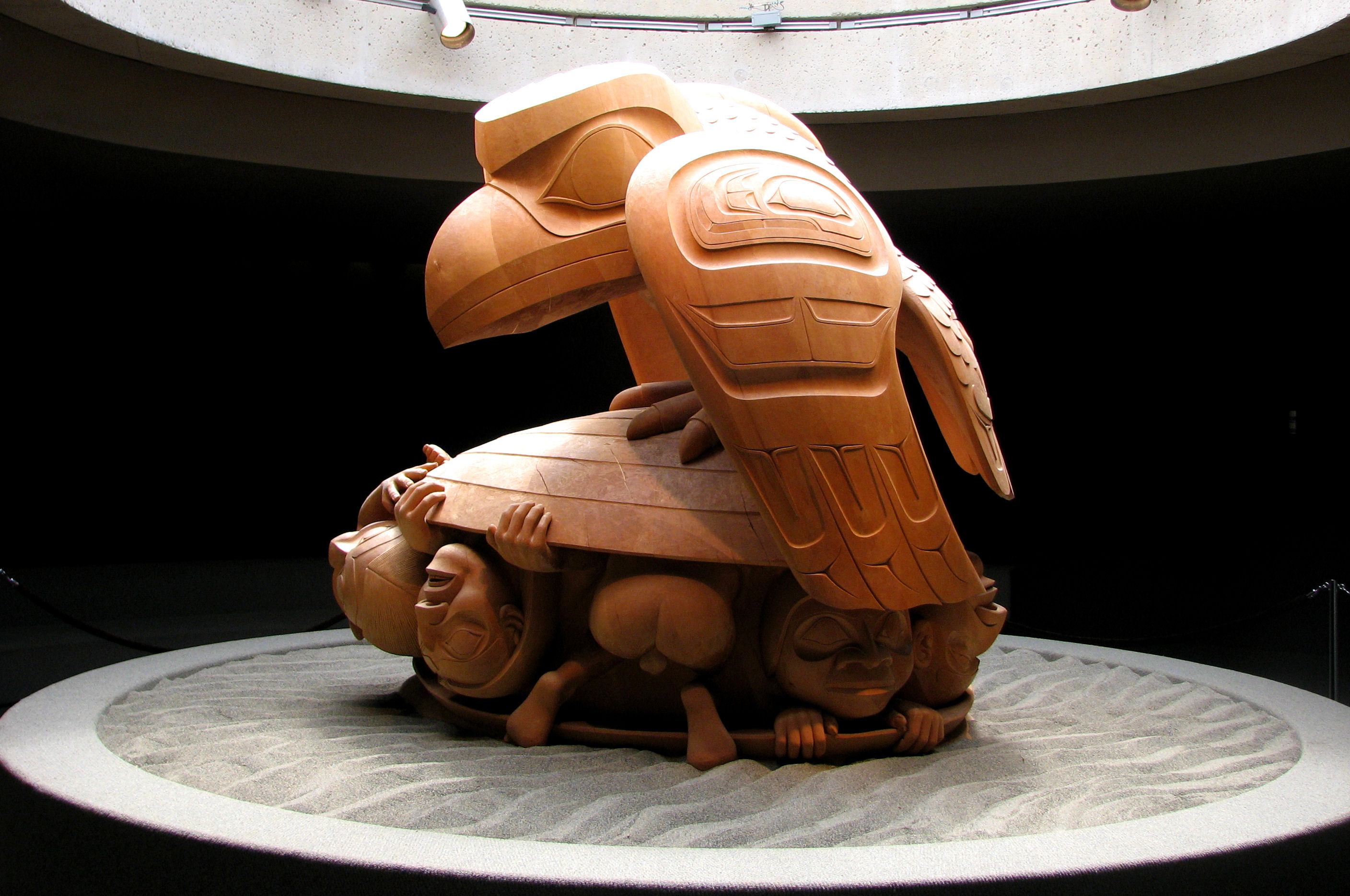
Bill Reid's Raven and the First Men (1980), UBC Museum of Anthropology, depicts a scene from the Haida creation myth. The Raven represents both the creator and trickster figures, common to many mythologies.

The Haida people can trace their traditional territories to the Haida Gwaii archipelago in British Columbia and to the southern reaches of the Alaskan Panhandle. To the Haida, Raven was the Bringer of Light and before Raven the world was nothing more than a gigantic flood. Raven was the Maker of Things, as well as the Transformer, Magician and Healer. Raven was bored of the world being nothing but water and decided to fly as the waters receded. Once Raven became hungry, land was formed so he could land and find food. It was at this point he noticed strange sounds coming from a gigantic clam shell. Confused as to the sound, Raven decided he would begin singing to the clam shell in response to its sound, hoping to calm it with his pleasant sounds. Raven did this because he was a beautiful singer. Finally, a small creature emerged from the clam shell. It had long black hair, a round head, brown smooth skin and two legs like Raven but no feathers. This was the first of the First People.

When he got bored with them, he considered returning them to their shell, but opted instead to find female counterparts of these male beings. The raven found some female humans trapped in a chiton, freed them, and was entertained as the two sexes met and began to interact. The Raven felt responsible and very protective of them, thus many Haida myths and legends often suggest the raven as a provider to mankind and combine the roles of the creator and the trickster.

There are other versions that tells of a different creation. When the earth was only sky and water with a single reef that rose out of the water where all of the great beings lived with the greatest of them living at the highest point on the reef and the weakest of them living at the bottom. But Raven flew above them all and could never find a place to land. For that reason he decided to travel to the sky country where he met the Chief's daughter who had recently had a child. While it was dark, Raven possessed the baby and intended to take its place as Raven Child.

==== Sun, Moon and Stars ====
One ancient story told on Haida Gwaii tells about how Raven helped to bring the Sun, Moon, Stars, Fresh Water, and Fire to the world:

Long ago, near the beginning of the world, Gray Eagle was the guardian of the Sun, Moon and Stars, of fresh water, and of fire. Gray Eagle hated people so much that he kept these things hidden. People lived in darkness, without fire and without fresh water.

Gray Eagle had a beautiful daughter, and Raven fell in love with her. In the beginning, Raven was a snow-white bird, and as such, he pleased Gray Eagle's daughter. She invited him to her father's longhouse.

When Raven saw the Sun, Moon and stars, and fresh water hanging on the sides of Eagle's lodge, he knew what he should do. He watched for his chance to seize them when no one was looking. He stole all of them, and a brand of fire also, and flew out of the longhouse through the smoke hole. As soon as Raven got outside he hung the Sun up in the sky. It made so much light that he was able to fly far out to an island in the middle of the ocean. When the Sun set, he fastened the Moon up in the sky and hung the stars around in different places. By this new light he kept on flying, carrying with him the fresh water and the brand of fire he had stolen.

He flew back over the land. When he had reached the right place, he dropped all the water he had stolen. It fell to the ground and there became the source of all the fresh-water streams and lakes in the world. Then Raven flew on, holding the brand of fire in his bill. The smoke from the fire blew back over his white feathers and made them black. When his bill began to burn, he had to drop the firebrand. It struck rocks and hid itself within them. That is why, if you strike two stones together, sparks of fire will drop out.

Raven's feathers never became white again after they were blackened by the smoke from the firebrand. That is why Raven is now a black bird.

Other Haida stories include:

1. "The Coming of the Salmon"
2. "The Raven and the First Men"
3. "The Bear and His Indian Wife"

=== Heiltsuk (Bella Bella) ===
The Heiltsuk were formerly known as the Bella Bella people and their traditional lands are along the central coast of British Columbia. To the Heiltsuk, Raven was known as the Real Chief or He'mask.as. Raven is revered by them as a benevolent figure. He helps people, but he is also a trickster spirit whose unreflected behaviour gets him into trouble.

1. "The World is Burnt" Raven foretells a world fire

=== Kwakwakaʼwakw ===
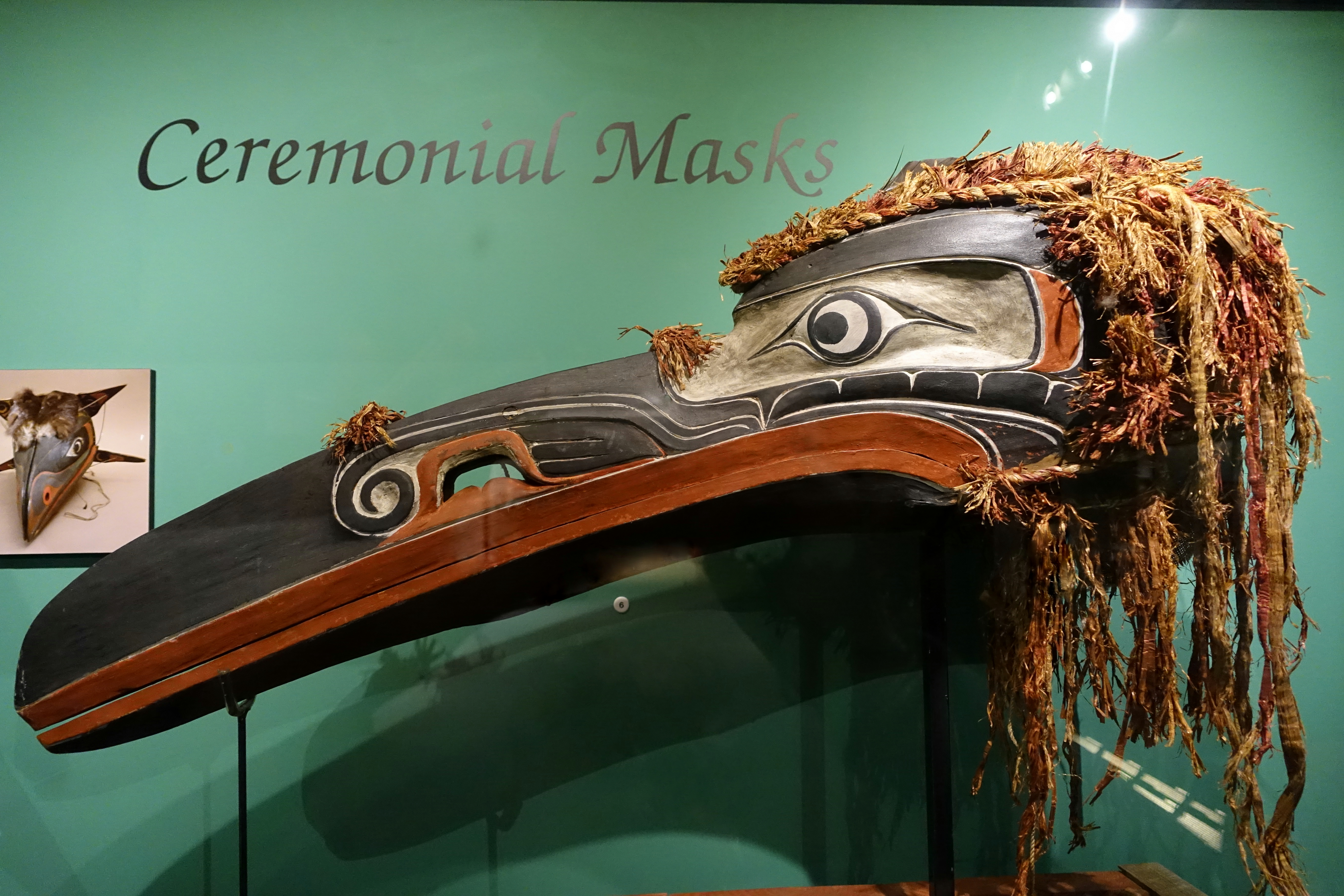
Kwakwakaʼwakw raven mask

Another story of the Kwakiutl or Kwakwakaʼwakw of British Columbia who exposed boys' placentas to ravens to encourage future prophetic visions, thereby associating the raven with prophecy, similar to the traditions of Scandinavia.

1. "Wakiash and the First Totem Pole"

=== Miwok ===
The Miwok are segregated into three distinct groups: the Coast Miwok, the Lake Miwok, and the Plains and Sierra Miwok (Interior) which make up the majority of the overall population.

The Miwok territory is defined by the Maidu to their right, the Yokuts to the left, and the Washoe and Mono behind them. The Interior Miwok faction live primarily on the western side of the Sierra Nevada above the lower San Joaquin Valley. The Sierra territory of the Miwok extended from the Cosumnes River on the north to the Fresno River on the south but the other boundaries that are shared with the Yokuts, Wintun, and Maidu have always been a matter of controversy.

Among the Northern Miwok of what is now Central California the story of Raven begins with a world covered in water except for a single mountain top where people had gathered during the flooding of the world. As the waters receded the people tried to come down from the mountain but the land was so soft with mud that those that tried would sink into the ground. Wherever a person sank, a raven would come and stand on that spot. One raven at each hole. Once the ground hardened the raven turned into a person, explaining why Miwok are so dark.

=== Nuu-chah-nulth ===
The Nuu-chah-nulth, who speak a southern Wakashan language known as Nuu-chah-nulth, are also known commonly as the Nootka.

1. "Octopus and Raven"

=== Ojibwe ===
The Ojibwe are also known by other names including Anishinaabe which is the name of their language, Ojibwe, or Algonquin.

The Saulteaux or Plains Ojibwa, also known as Bûngi Indians, live on the Long Plains Reserve in Manitoba.

1. "Turtle's War-Party"
2. "The Man and the Ravens"

=== Puget Sound ===
Another raven story from the Puget Sound region describes the "Raven" as having originally lived in the land of spirits (literally bird land) that existed before the world of humans. One day the Raven became so bored with bird land that he flew away, carrying a stone in his beak. When the Raven became tired of carrying the stone and dropped it, the stone fell into the ocean and expanded until it formed the firmament on which humans now live.

1. "The Legend of Raven"

=== Pima ===
The Pima are in Arizona.

1. "The Children of Cloud"

=== Quileute ===
The Quileute are a Native American people in western Washington state in the United States, currently numbering approximately 2000. Their language belongs to the Chimakuan languages family.

The native name for Raven among the Quileute is Báyaḳ (By-yuhk).

Quileute Indians were the southernmost group along the Pacific Coast whose mythology included several stories of the Raven. Though the Quileute's primary protagonist was not the Raven, but Kweeti, whose stories can be very closely related to similar stories of the Tlingit involving the Raven.

The Raven, among the Quileute people, is used to tell scary stories to children of how Raven's feet look the way they do; others pursued children to be generous rather than selfish, or to be true to themselves and work hard rather than trying to take shortcuts. In their stories Raven is often punished, or must witness suffering by the people whom he cares for as a result of his trickery.

In the Quileute story of Duskeah

In the first story of "Kweeti" the story goes "At Neah Bay he taught them to fish, as all men do. He traversed the whole world." which is compared to the Tlingit story "Raven teaches people their mode of life".

Again in the story of the "Kweeti and the Wolves", "Finally, when the wolves had all but caught him, Kweeti urinated and made Ozetta Lake." which is compared to "Raven Creates Rivers".

But in one story, Raven and Kweeti meet and Kweed entertains Raven.

1. "Báyaḳ and Ákil" (Raven and Bear)
2. "Báyaḳ and K^{w}íd" (Raven and Fishduck)
3. "Báyaḳ and Pák^{w}ad" (Raven and Skatefish)
4. "Báyaḳ and Píxťadax" (Raven and Eagle)
5. "The Bungling Host"
6. "Duskeah"
7. "Raven lights the world: Hungry for clams"

=== Salishan ===
==== Coeur d'Alene ====
The Coeur d'Alene live in villages along the Coeur d'Alene, Saint Joe, Clark Fork and Spokane Rivers; as well as sites on the shores of Lake Coeur d'Alene, Lake Pend Oreille and Lake Hayden, in what is now northern Idaho, eastern Washington and western Montana.

1. "Circling Raven and the Jesuits"

==== Squamish ====
The Squamish see Raven to be a symbol of the Creator and even to this day is the subject of preachings.

1. "Raven: The Brave Warrior"
2. "Raven Proposes and is Accepted"
3. "Raven and the Fish Melt"
4. "The Mink, the Raven and the Sea Eggs"

=== Shishalh ===
Stories from the Shishalh or Schelt include:

1. "The Seal and the Raven"

=== Tlingit ===
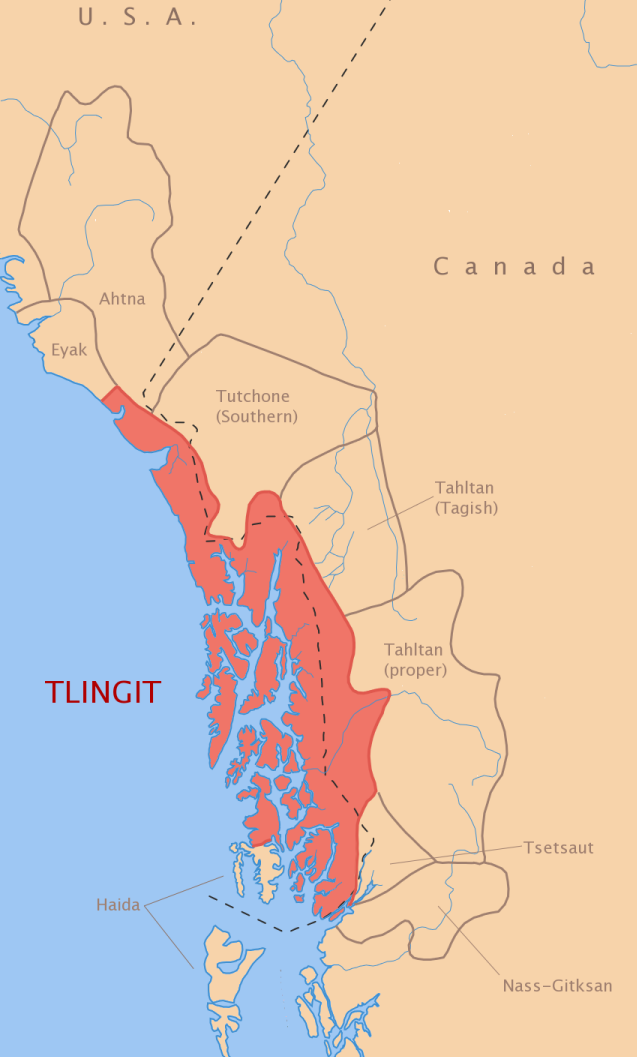
Tlingit and neighbouring peoples

Tlingit territory is in Southeast Alaska. Most of their territory is in present-day Canada.

The Tlingit have many names for raven, the most common being Yéil. Other names are Yéil Tl’éetl’i, g̱uneit, gidzanóox’ and yéilk’. The mythological origin of his name is that he was given it by the tide woman. An etymological relation in Tlingit is to the verb “Yéil” which denotes trickery, lies, and mimicry.

In Tlingit culture, there are two different raven characters which can be identified, although they are not always clearly differentiated. One is the creator raven, responsible for bringing the world into being and who is sometimes considered to be the individual who brought light to the darkness. The other is the childish raven, always selfish, sly, conniving, and hungry. When the Great Spirit created all things he kept them separate and stored in cedar boxes. The Great Spirit gifted these boxes to the animals who existed before humans. When the animals opened the boxes all the things that comprise the world came into being. The boxes held such things as mountains, fire, water, wind and seeds for all the plants. One such box, which was given to Seagull, contained all the light of the world. Seagull coveted his box and refused to open it, clutching it under his wing. All the people asked Raven to persuade Seagull to open it and release the light. Despite begging, demanding, flattering and trying to trick him into opening the box, Seagull still refused. Raven became angry and frustrated, and stuck a thorn in Seagull's foot. Raven pushed the thorn in deeper until the pain caused Seagull to drop the box. Then out of the box came the sun, moon and stars that brought light to the world and allowed the first day to begin.

==== Theft of water ====
Raven continued using such trickery to bring water and stamp people, animals and other features in the world with certain characteristics. Many versions of Raven's theft of water are told but all centre on Raven's trickery against the owner of water. In one version Raven leads its owner to believe he has soiled his bed in his sleep and threatens to shame him unless he shares his water with Raven. In another version Raven puts ash on his tongue to fool the owner to believe his extreme thirst is unquenched. Instead of drinking the water Raven collects it in a seal's bladder hidden under his clothes and flees with all of it.

=== Tsimshian ===
To the Tsimshian, Raven, was known as Txamsem or ganhada or the Clever One and was accompanied by a brother named Lagabula or Lazy One.

The two had been born in a kelp patch and adopted by a Chief's wife and a magical being from the region of Prince Rupert Harbour. At the time of their birth things such as daylight did not yet exist; only dusk. Some records contradict this stating that they were of Gispaxloats origin, born of a Gispaxloats Chief who married a beautiful princess.

Among their journeys, they travelled to a mountain at the head of the Nass River. Txamsem, who could transform into anything, and often took the form of a human or bird, turned himself into a pine needle and was consumed by the daughter of the Chief who guarded daylight. She then gave birth to him as a baby and the baby cried incessantly to play with daylight. As soon as it was given to the baby in the form of a playful ball, he transformed back into Raven and flew away with it. He travelled back up the Nass River with daylight and released it; immediately lighting up the river and allowing it to spread all over the world.

The most prominent culture hero for many of the indigenous peoples of the Pacific Northwest is Raven. There are numerous stories, widely distributed which focus on the Raven myth and his adventures to satisfy his insatiable desire to obtain whatever he wants. The plot of most Raven tales, tell of how Raven is able to use force or trickery to obtain or motivate someone else to relinquish an object he desires. Throughout his many stories, Raven claims daylight, water, fire, the oceans waves, the olachen, salmon, the soil, and even the weather.

Through the Raven tales, people are able to explain why their surrounding environment was the way it was by linking the Raven or his companions as the cause for why various things in the world come about.

Some stories account for the creation of dangerous animals which were transformed from inanimate objects(No 61. p 572), others suggest that men, animals and objects could be turned to stone.(nos89-93). While other stories suggest how names were attributed to important landmarks, and how significant geographical features came about.

There is a vague mention that Raven was the ancestor of the Raven Clan, but there are no other direct references between Raven and the ancestry of the Indian people.

1. "The Beginning"
2. "The Theft of Light"
3. "Raven Becomes Voracious"
4. Origin of Txa'msem
5. Origin of daylight
6. Stone and Elderberry Bush
7. Origin of fire
8. Txa'msem uses the sinews of the tomtit
9. Origin of tides
10. Giant gambles with Gull
11. Giant obtains the olachen
12. Giant learns how to cook olachen
13. Giant and the gulls
14. Txa'msem and the steelhead-salmon
15. Txa'msem and Lagobola’
16. Txa'msem and the crab
17. Origin of the bullhead
18. Txa'msem frightens away the owners of a whale
19. Txa'msem finds a beautiful blanket
20. Txa'msem and his slave
21. Txa'msem kills his slave
22. Fishermen break off Txa'msem jaw
23. Txa'msem and the Hunter
24. Txa'msem and the children
25. Txa'msem and the salmon woman
26. Txa'msem makes war on the south wind
27. Txa'msem makes a girl sick and then cures her
28. Txa'msem pretends to build a canoe
29. Txa'msem visits Chief Echo
30. Txa'msem kills Little Pitch
31. Txa'msem kills Grizzly Bear
32. Txa'msem kills Deer
33. Txa'msem imitates Chief Seal
34. Txa'msem imitates Chief Kingfisher
35. Txa'msem imitates the thrush
36. Txa'msem and Cormorant
37. Txa'msem returns to the Wolves
38. Txa'msem invites the monsters
39. The further history of Txa'msem
40. Txa'msem invites the monsters
41. The further history of Txa'msem
42. Raven obtains fresh water
43. Raven paints the birds
44. Raven carves salmon out of various kinds of wood
45. Raven marries the dead twin
46. Raven abducts the daughter of the salmon chief
47. Raven gets the soil
48. Why Crow and Raven are black
49. Raven and Eagle gather red and black cod
50. Raven marries Hair-Seal-Woman
51. Raven steals salmon eggs
52. Raven steals his sisters' berries
53. Raven's gizzard is torn out
54. Raven kills the seals
55. Raven pretends to be dead
56. Raven burns his sister's groins
57. Raven deserts Master Fisherman on a lonely island
58. War with the Thunderbird
59. Wren kills the Bear
60. Raven pulls off the arm of a chief
61. Raven is set adrift

=== Zuni ===
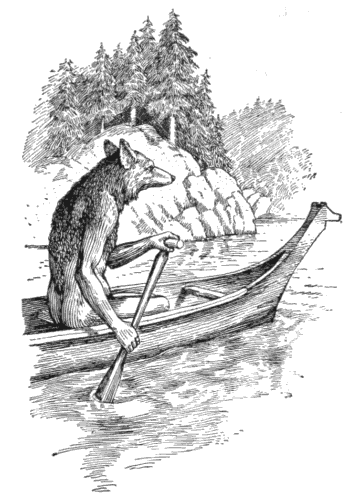
The Coyote canoeing up Columbia River. The Raven shares the trickster nature with the coyote in Native American mythologies, but for the Zuni people he lacks the negative characteristics.

The raven is not a traditional fetish of the Zuni but he, along with the Macaw play a part in the Zuni story of migration and is carved often in their artwork, typically carved from black marble though not exclusively.

The Zuni consider Raven to be a prankster but without negative characteristics which they associate with the coyote. The Raven's greatest traits are his ability to assist the people in overcoming their failures by offering gentle reminders that anything people have the courage to face, thus too do they have the power to transform.

1. "Origin of Raven and the Macaw"
2. "The Search for the Corn Maidens"

== Modern adaptations ==
There have been many children's and picture books that recount traditional Raven Tales. These new versions have been criticized for portraying a much "nicer" Raven with little left from the original greedy trickster. In some stories Raven acts for the good of people and not for himself. In other stories Raven refuses to use force, and sexual themes are edited out. Trickery is in some instances substituted for magic. These newer tales are also written in conventions of Western rather than Native American literature thus conveying the message that native storytellers' ability or style is inferior.

In 2004, The Smithsonian Institution sponsored Chris Kientz to develop a series of half-hour animated television programs targeted at schoolchildren as an entertaining way of educating kids on Aboriginal folklore. The show Raven Tales was produced by the Canadian-based New Machine Studios and working along with producer Winadzi James and aired for two seasons with a total of 26 episodes.

In 2010, Matt Dembicki produced an anthological graphic novel of the trickster stories, making sure to maintain the cultural integrity of the stories with the help of 21 Native American storytellers who were paired directly with several graphic designers.

== See also ==
- Indigenous peoples in Canada
- Alaska Native storytelling
- Cultural depictions of ravens
- History of the west coast of North America
- Kutkh
- Northwest Coast art
- The Raven – a German fairy tale collected by the Brothers Grimm
- The Seven Ravens – a German fairy tale collected by the Brothers Grimm
- Thunderbird (mythology)
