= Big Raven Plateau =

Plateau in British Columbia, Canada

- Volcanic plateau
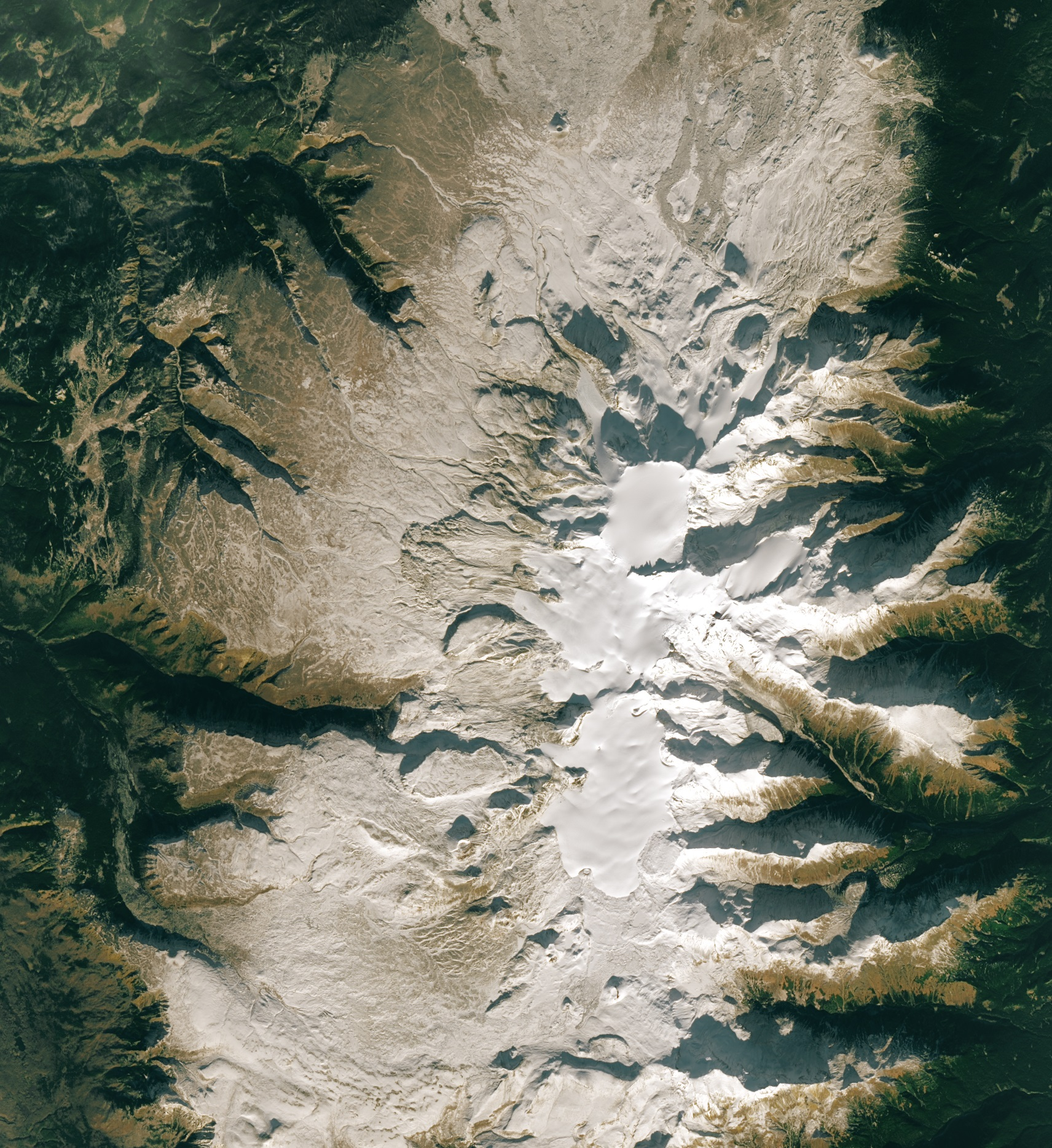
- Satellite image of the Big Raven Plateau

- Location in British Columbia
- Location in Mount Edziza Provincial Park
- Coordinates: 57°42′N 130°45′W
- Location: British Columbia, Canada
- Range: Tahltan Highland
- Part of: Mount Edziza complex
- Age: 7.4 Ma to less than 20 ka
- Formed by: Volcanism
- Geology: Trachybasalt, trachyte, hawaiite, tristanite, mugearite, comendite, benmoreite, pantellerite, alkali basalt
- Etymology: Big Raven (Tse'sketco)

Dimensions
  - Length: Approximately 35 km (22 mi)
  - Width: Approximately 20 km (12 mi)
- Last eruption: Less than 2,000 years ago
- Topo map: NTS 104G10 Mount Edziza
- Designation: Mount Edziza Provincial Park
- Drained by: Tsecha Creek, Tennaya Creek, Tenchen Creek, Taweh Creek, Sorcery Creek, Shaman Creek, Sezill Creek, Pyramid Creek, Nido Creek, Kadeya Creek, Elwyn Creek, Cook Creek
- Borders on: Chakima Creek valley (south); Walkout Creek valley (south); Klastline River valley (north); Kakiddi Creek valley (east); Mess Creek valley (west)

The Big Raven Plateau is an intermontane plateau of volcanic origin in northwestern British Columbia, Canada. It lies on the Tahltan Highland in Cassiar Land District and is roughly oval in shape. The eastern side of the plateau is heavily eroded whereas the western and northern sides are moderately and slightly eroded, respectively. Unlike the surrounding valleys, the Big Raven Plateau is relatively barren of vegetation due to its alpine climate. The lower slopes of the plateau contain a mixture of white spruce, trembling aspen, lodgepole pine and balsam poplar. Draining the Big Raven Plateau are several small streams that flow into the surrounding valleys; these valleys contain the Klastline River and the Mess, Kakiddi, Chakime and Walkout creeks.

The Big Raven Plateau measures about 35 by 20 kilometres (22 by 12 miles). Its dominant feature is Mount Edziza, an ice-covered volcanic massif reaching an elevation of 2,786 metres (9,140 feet) in the middle of the plateau. The Desolation Lava Field at the northern end of the plateau contains several small cinder cones, 10 of which are named. At the southern end of the plateau is the Snowshoe Lava Field; it contains only five named volcanic features. Surrounding the plateau is Mount Edziza Provincial Park, one of the largest provincial parks in British Columbia. Access is mainly by aircraft or by a network of horse trails from surrounding roads.

At least 10 geological formations make up the Big Raven Plateau, each representing a distinct period of volcanic activity. They were deposited by successive eruptions of lava and pyroclastic rocks in the last 7.5 million years; the latest eruptions occurred less than 2,000 years ago. The formations are part of the Mount Edziza volcanic complex, which also includes the Kitsu Plateau and the Spectrum Range to the south. Renewed volcanism on the Big Raven Plateau could dam local streams with lava or threaten air traffic if ash columns were to be produced.

A wide range of volcanic rocks characterizes the Big Raven Plateau, the most common of which is basalt; it occurs in most of the geological formations comprising the plateau. More evolved volcanic rocks such as trachybasalt, tristanite, mugearite, benmoreite, trachyte and rhyolite largely occur at Mount Edziza. Most of the volcanic eruptions on the plateau in the last 20,000 years have issued mainly basaltic lava from vents in the Desolation and Snowshoe lava fields. The volcanic rocks characterizing the plateau are in the form of lava flows, lava domes and breccias.

== Geography ==
=== Location ===
The Big Raven Plateau is in Cassiar Land District of northwestern British Columbia, Canada. It lies on the Tahltan Highland east of the Zagoddetchino massif and west of the mountainous Klastline Plateau. Between the Zagoddetchino massif and the Big Raven Plateau is Mess Creek valley, which extends more than 60 kilometres (37 miles) to the south. The north–south trending Kakiddi Creek valley lies between the Big Raven and Klastline plateaus; it includes the Nuttlude, Kakiddi, Mowchilla and Mowdade lakes. Bounding the northern end of the Big Raven Plateau is the Klastline River valley. The southern end is bounded by two relatively small east–west trending valleys, between which a mountain ridge extends south of the plateau. Southeast of the plateau are the Skeena Mountains whereas the Boundary Ranges of the Coast Mountains occur to the southwest.

The Big Raven Plateau is the northernmost and largest of three intermontane plateaus associated with the Mount Edziza volcanic complex. This north–south trending volcanic complex consists of a group of overlapping shield volcanoes, stratovolcanoes, lava domes and cinder cones that have formed over the last 7.5 million years. Four central volcanoes occur along its axis; the two youngest, Mount Edziza and Ice Peak, are on the Big Raven Plateau. The volcanic complex also includes the Arctic Lake and Kitsu plateaus, as well as the Spectrum Range to the south. All of these landforms lie within Mount Edziza Provincial Park, one of the largest provincial parks in British Columbia. The park was established in 1972 to preserve the volcanic landscape.

=== Drainage ===
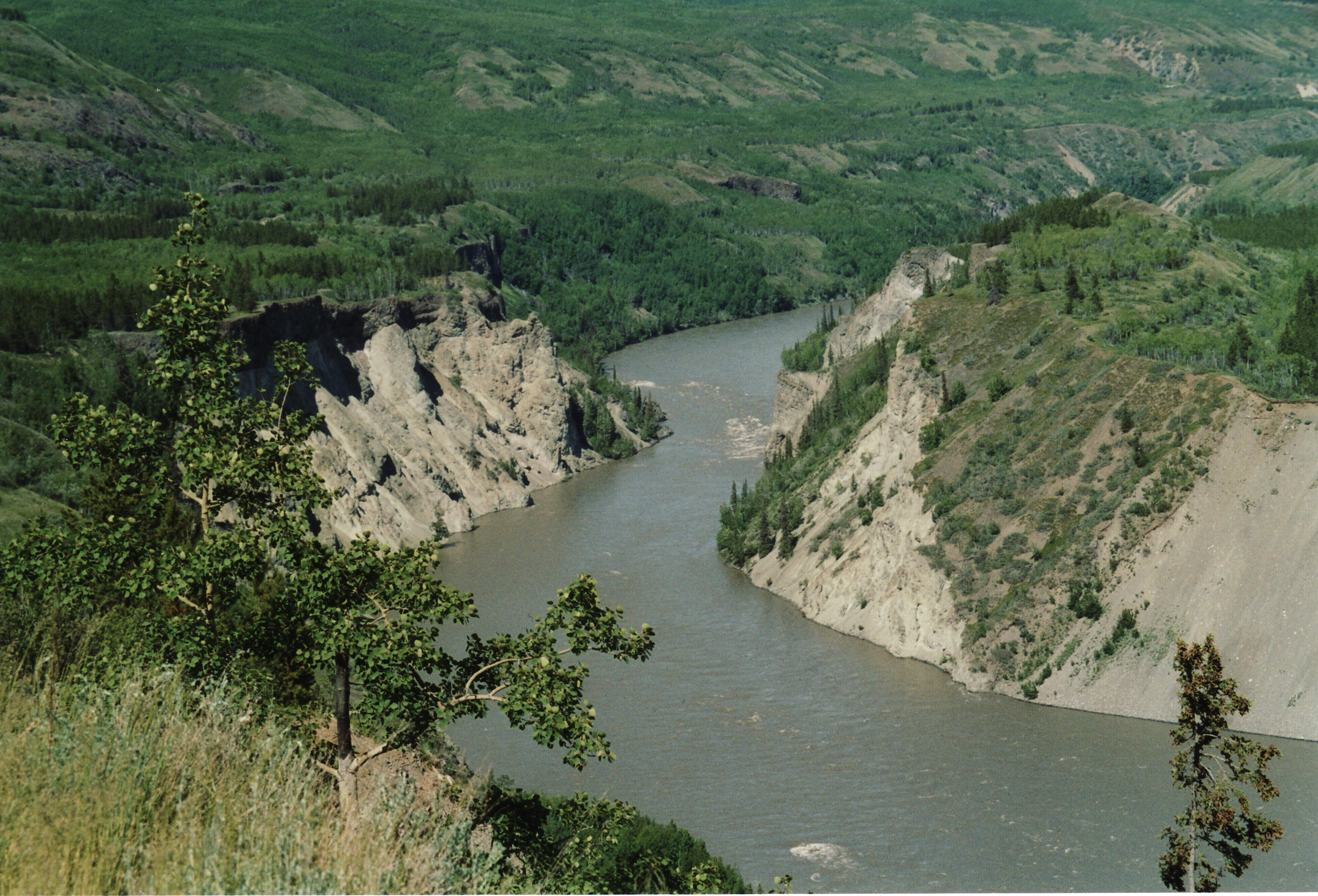
The Big Raven Plateau drains into the Stikine River via tributaries

As a part of the Mount Edziza volcanic complex, the Big Raven Plateau is drained entirely by streams within the Stikine River watershed. The northeastern portion of the plateau is drained by Tsecha Creek, which flows northeast into Kakiddi Creek. Draining the eastern side of the plateau are several east-flowing streams choked with glacial and landslide debris from rapidly eroding headwalls; from north to south these are the Pyramid, Tenchen, Nido, Tennaya, Sorcery and Shaman creeks. Transportation of the debris into Kakiddi Valley has resulted in the formation of several large alluvial fans, behind which the Nuttlude, Kakiddi, Mowdade and Mowchilla lakes have formed. The Nido and Tennaya creeks flow into Nuttlude Lake whereas the Sorcery and Shaman creeks flow into Kakiddi Lake. Both of these lakes are expansions of Kakiddi Creek which flows north into the Klastline River, a tributary of the Stikine River.

Elwyn Creek and its tributary, Kadeya Creek, drain the northwestern portion of the Big Raven Plateau; Elwyn Creek flows westward whereas Kadeya Creek flows to the northwest. Northwest-flowing Taweh Creek and its tributary, the westward-flowing Sezill Creek, drain the southwestern and western portions of the plateau, respectively. The Elwyn and Taweh creeks are tributaries of Mess Creek, which flows northwestward into the Stikine River. Small, unnamed streams drain the northern end of the plateau and flow north into the Klastline River; these streams are shallowly incised into the plateau. At the southern end of the plateau is a drainage divide between Chakima Creek, flowing east into the Kakiddi drainage, and Walkout Creek flowing west via Raspberry Creek into Mess Creek.

=== Structure ===
The Big Raven Plateau is about 35 km (22 mi) long and 20 km (12 mi) wide. It is roughly oval in shape, largely covered with colluvium (Note: Colluvium is the loose accumulation of rock and soil debris at the foot of a slope.) and relatively barren of vegetation, which contrasts with the surrounding valleys. Colluvium on the plateau consists of felsenmeer, till and glacial and fluvial outwash, as well as solifluction deposits. The western side of the plateau has been moderately dissected by stream erosion, which has resulted in the formation of steep-sided canyons; the Elwyn, Sezill and Taweh canyons are the largest. Forming the southwestern edge of the plateau is the Mess Creek Escarpment, which extends at least 25 km (16 mi) to the south. The plateau surface reaches an elevation of at least 1,800 m (6,000 ft) whereas the slopes descend to an elevation of around 910 m (3,000 ft).

In contrast to the northern end of the plateau which is relatively smooth and uneroded, the eastern side has undergone extensive erosion. This has resulted in the creation of steep spurs with intervening valleys. A handful of these spurs are named on the southeastern side of the plateau; from north to south they are the Idiji, Sorcery and Cartoona ridges. Idiji Ridge extends east from the northern end of Tencho Glacier and is the namesake of Idiji Glacier, which exists to the northwest. Sorcery Ridge, which shares its name with adjacent Sorcery Creek, extends east from the southern end of Tencho Glacier. Cartoona Ridge lies between the Chakima and Shaman valleys; it shares its name with Cartoona Peak at the westernmost end of the ridge.

=== Landforms ===
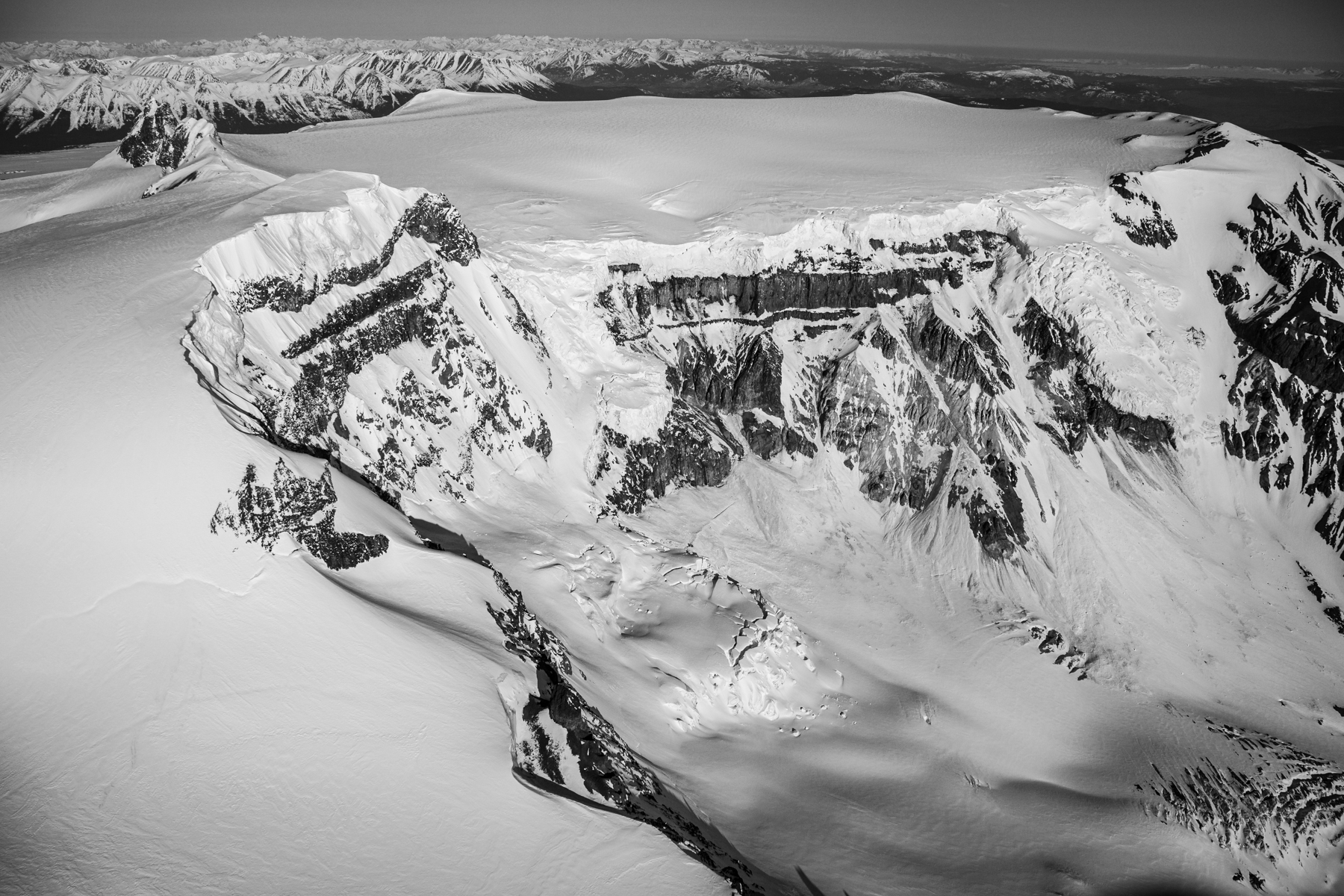
The summit crater of Mount Edziza

The Big Raven Plateau is dominated by the ice-covered stratovolcano of Mount Edziza, which rises to an elevation of 2,786 m (9,140 ft) in the middle of the plateau. Immediately north of Mount Edziza is the Desolation Lava Field, which covers an area of more than 150 km^{2} (58 mi^{2}). Most of the lava forming this feature issued from cinder cones near the northern trim line of Mount Edziza's ice cap. The Snowshoe Lava Field immediately southwest of Mount Edziza covers an area of about 40 km^{2} (15 mi^{2}); it mostly issued from cones on the southwestern flank of Ice Peak. Smaller features on the plateau include the Hoia, Kaia, Ornostay and Koosick bluffs, the Kana and Klastline cones, Cartoona Peak, Tsekone Ridge and Camp Hill. The Hoia and Kaia bluffs are at the southwestern and southeastern ends of the plateau, respectively, the former of which is along Taweh Creek. Cartoona Peak at the southeastern end of the plateau is a prominent spire and an erosional remnant of a larger volcano.

Camp Hill between the Raspberry and Taweh creeks reaches an elevation of 1,880 m (6,170 ft) near the southwestern edge of the plateau. Kana Cone on the extreme northern side of the plateau has an elevation of 1,100 m (3,600 ft) and is covered with vegetation. It is 60 m (200 ft) high and contains a 20 m (66 ft) deep summit crater whose northern rim has been breached. Klastline Cone on the eastern side of the plateau near the head of Pyramid Creek has an elevation of 1,400 m (4,600 ft); its summit is below the level of the plateau. Tsekone Ridge attains an elevation of 1,920 m (6,300 ft) near the head of Elwyn Canyon at the northwestern end of the plateau. This isolated, elliptical mound rises 180 m (590 ft) above the plateau surface; its north–south axis has a length of nearly 2 km (1.2 mi). The Ornostay and Koosick bluffs are near the middle of the plateau adjacent to the head of Sezill Canyon. Both bluffs are similar in geomorphology, but Koosick is larger; it has a length of nearly 2 km (1.2 mi) and a width of more than 1 km (0.62 mi).

==== Mount Edziza ====
Mount Edziza is a nearly symmetrical volcanic cone containing a nearly flat summit with an ice-filled, 2 km (1.2 mi) in diameter crater. The symmetry of the volcano is broken by several steep-sided lava domes, including The Pyramid and the Sphinx, Glacier and Triangle domes. Surrounding the summit crater is a circular ridge breached to the east by active cirques where the remains of several lava lakes are exposed inside the crater. The ridge is partially exposed above the ice cap as a discontinuous series of spires and serrated nunataks; spires forming the southern end of the ridge are the highest. Although the eastern side of Mount Edziza has been deeply dissected by glacial erosion, less dissection has taken place on the southern and northwestern flanks of the volcano. Extending northwest from the northwestern flank of Mount Edziza is Pillow Ridge, so-named for its exposures of pillow lava.

About 3 km (1.9 mi) south of the summit is Ice Peak, the southern peak of Mount Edziza. This prominent pyramid-shaped horn has an elevation of 2,500 m (8,200 ft) and is the glacially eroded remains of an older stratovolcano. The northern flank of this volcano is overlain by the younger edifice of Mount Edziza. In contrast, the eastern flank has been almost completely destroyed by headward erosion of glacial valleys. The southern and western flanks are nearly identical to those of the original stratovolcano. At its climax, the Ice Peak volcano had a symmetrical profile and contained a small crater at its summit; the current summit is an erosional remnant etched from the eastern crater rim.

==== Snowshoe Lava Field ====
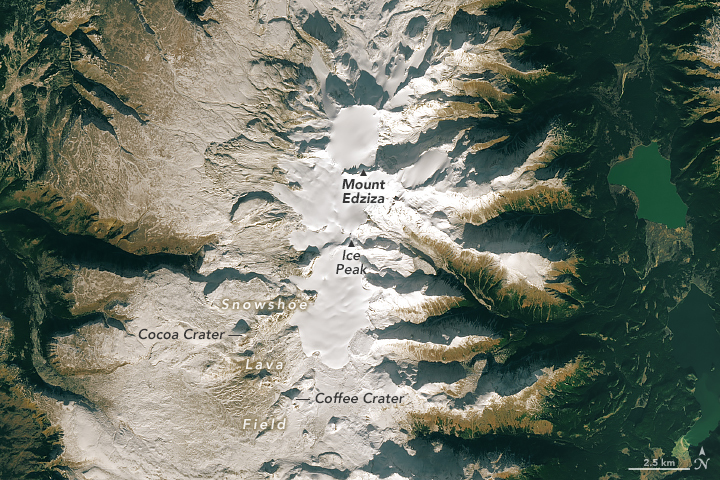
Satellite image of the Big Raven Plateau showing the locations of Mount Edziza, Ice Peak and Cocoa and Coffee craters in the Snowshoe Lava Field

The Snowshoe Lava Field at the southern end of the Big Raven Plateau consists of blocky basaltic lava flows. It issued from at least 12 separate vents, most of which are associated with a cinder cone. Nearly all of these vents are adjacent to the lower edges of broad glaciers projecting from Mount Edziza's ice cap and occur at elevations above 1,800 m (5,900 ft). Most of the lava ponded as thick flows on the gently sloping surface of the plateau. However, some of it also flowed into upper Sezill Canyon, the head of Taweh Creek and the narrow tributary valleys of Walkout and Shaman creeks.

Tennena Cone, Cocoa Crater, Keda Cone, Coffee Crater and The Saucer are the only named volcanic features in the Snowshoe Lava Field, which are 2,350 to 1,920 m (7,710 to 6,300 ft) in elevation. The oldest named feature, Tennena Cone, is a subglacial volcano that formed on the upper western flank of Ice Peak. Its formation may have occurred during the Last Glacial Maximum, the Younger Dryas or a more recent glacial advance. Cocoa Crater, Keda Cone and Coffee Crater are subaerial cinder cones whereas The Saucer is a low, nearly circular mound of lava roughly 500 m (1,600 ft) in diameter.

==== Desolation Lava Field ====
The Desolation Lava Field at the northern end of the Big Raven Plateau consists of blocky basaltic lava flows and wind-sculptured ash beds. It was formed by the eruption of at least 10 cinder cones, most of which are clustered near the northern base of Mount Edziza. The lava field reaches an elevation of more than 1,370 m (4,490 ft) on the plateau. However, individual lava flows decrease in elevation to 820 m (2,690 ft) near Buckley Lake and 670 m (2,200 ft) in the Klastline Valley. The largest lava flow is about 14 km (8.7 mi) long and travelled into the Kakiddi and Klastline valleys where it temporarily blocked both streams.

From oldest to youngest, the cinder cones in this lava field are the Sleet, Storm, Triplex, Sidas, Twin, Moraine, Eve and Williams cones. The lowest, Twin Cone, is 1,430 m (4,690 ft) in elevation whereas the highest, Moraine Cone, is 2,135 m (7,005 ft) in elevation. Williams Cone is the largest, reaching 1.2 km (0.75 mi) wide at its base and rising about 275 m (902 ft) on the northeastern side of Mount Edziza. Eve Cone is one of the most symmetrical and best-preserved cinder cones in Canada. It contains a bowl-shaped crater at its summit and rises about 150 m (490 ft) in the middle of the Desolation Lava Field.

=== Biogeography ===
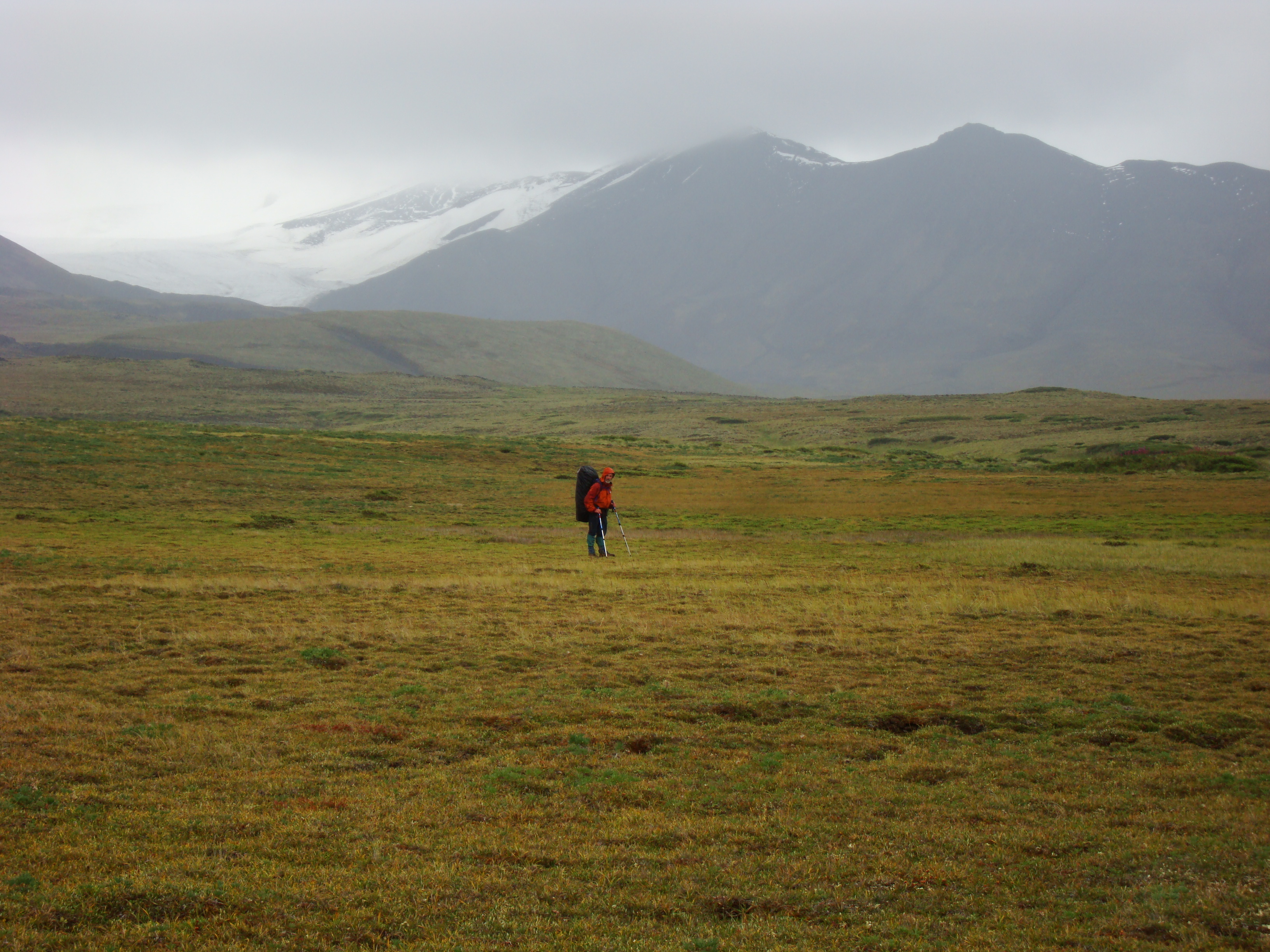
Alpine tundra on the Big Raven Plateau with Mount Edziza in the background

The Big Raven Plateau is in the Southern Boreal Plateau Ecosection, which includes Mount Edziza Provincial Park and other protected areas in northern British Columbia. This ecosection is part of the Boreal Mountains and Plateaus Ecoregion and consists of several wide river valleys, upland summits and deeply incised plateaus. White spruce is dominent on the lower slopes of the plateau where they extend into the Mess, Kakiddi and Klastline valleys. Trembling aspen and lodgepole pine are intermixed with white spruce in drier areas. Balsam poplar is present in wetter areas, such as near lakes and streams.

Alpine vegetation such as grasses are present above the tree line, but at higher elevations, barren rock is dominant. The alpine and subalpine zones on the western side of the plateau between Mount Edziza and the Mess Creek Escarpment contain small herds of Osborn caribou. Stone's sheep and mountain goats are present on the Mess Creek Escarpment, as well as on the eastern, western and southern flanks of Mount Edziza. Arctic ground squirrels are abundant above the tree line where grizzly bears have been occasionally seen.

=== Climate ===
Short, warm summers and cold, snowy winters characterize the Big Raven Plateau at elevations between 900 and 1,800 m (3,000 and 5,900 ft). Dense, cold air from the Arctic flows over Yukon during winter and early spring before flowing south to the area surrounding the plateau. Extremely cold temperatures and heavy cloud cover can occur in the area for extended periods during winter and early spring. This is primarily due to short daylight hours and the presence of Arctic air at that time of the year. The main location where snow exists year-round on the plateau is Mount Edziza, whose ice cap was estimated to have been roughly 70 km^{2} (27 mi^{2}) in 1992. During summer, the area is characterized by localized showers, high humidity and cumulus clouds. This weather is brought by convective currents, which are formed by surface heating of the many surrounding water bodies. The area lies within a rain shadow due to the presence of the Coast Mountains in the west; they block the flow of moist air from the Pacific Ocean.

== Geology ==
=== Stratigraphy ===
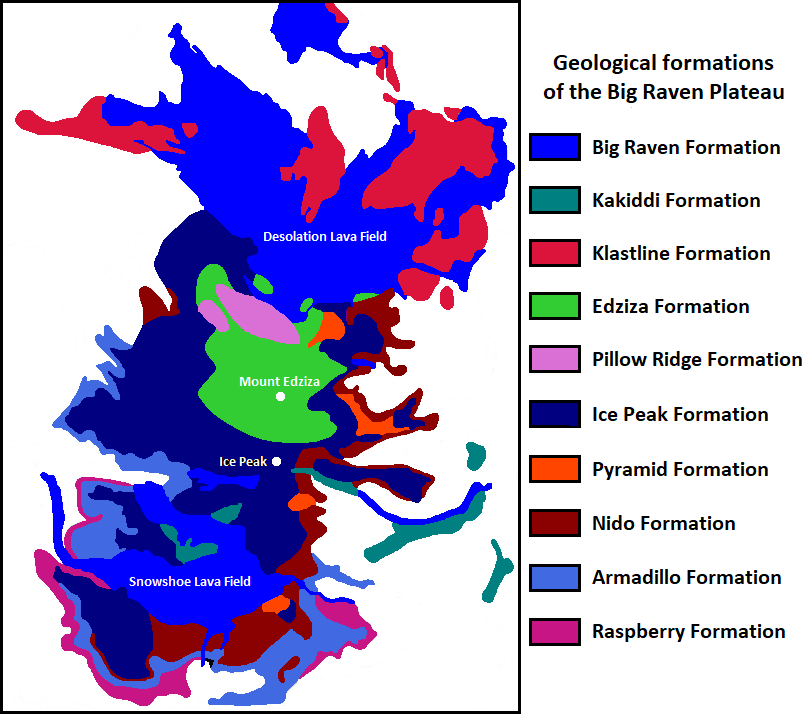
A map of geological formations forming the Big Raven Plateau. The small isolated occurrences east of the plateau are in the neighbouring Kakiddi Valley.

The Big Raven Plateau is subdivided into at least 10 geological formations, each representing a distinct period of volcanic activity. Volcanism during the first magmatic cycle of the Mount Edziza volcanic complex between 7.5 and six million years ago formed the Raspberry and Armadillo formations. The overlying Nido and Pyramid formations were deposited by volcanic eruptions during the second magmatic cycle between six and one million years ago.

Between about one and 0.8 million years ago, volcanism during the third magmatic cycle formed the Ice Peak, Pillow Ridge and Edziza formations. Volcanic eruptions during the fourth magmatic cycle between 0.8 and 0.2 million years ago deposited the Klastline and Kakiddi formations. The Big Raven Formation, the youngest forming the Big Raven Plateau, was deposited by eruptions during the fifth magmatic cycle in the last 20,000 years.

Most of the Big Raven Plateau rocks are assigned to the Nido, Ice Peak, Armadillo and Raspberry formations, which are the most voluminous. The Klastline, Kakiddi, Big Raven, Pyramid, Pillow Ridge and Edziza formations are significantly less extensive; the latter three are largely restricted to Mount Edziza. Nearly all of the Big Raven Formation lavas occur on the gently sloping surface of the plateau. However, they also exist on the flanks of Mount Edziza and in the summit area of Ice Peak.

==== Raspberry Formation ====
The Raspberry Formation is exposed at the base of prominent escarpments on the western, southwestern and southeastern sides of the Big Raven Plateau. It has an elevation of less than 1,310 m (4,300 ft) along the Mess Creek Escarpment and consists of basaltic lava flows interbedded with scoria. More than 180 m (590 ft) of Raspberry lava flows are exposed in the Mess Creek Escarpment, most of which issued from a Late Miocene shield volcano. A smaller volcanic centre northeast of the Raspberry shield was most likely the source of valley-filling lava flows exposed on and around Cartoona Ridge. The timing of Raspberry volcanism has been given a minimum age of 7.4–6.2 million years.

==== Armadillo Formation ====
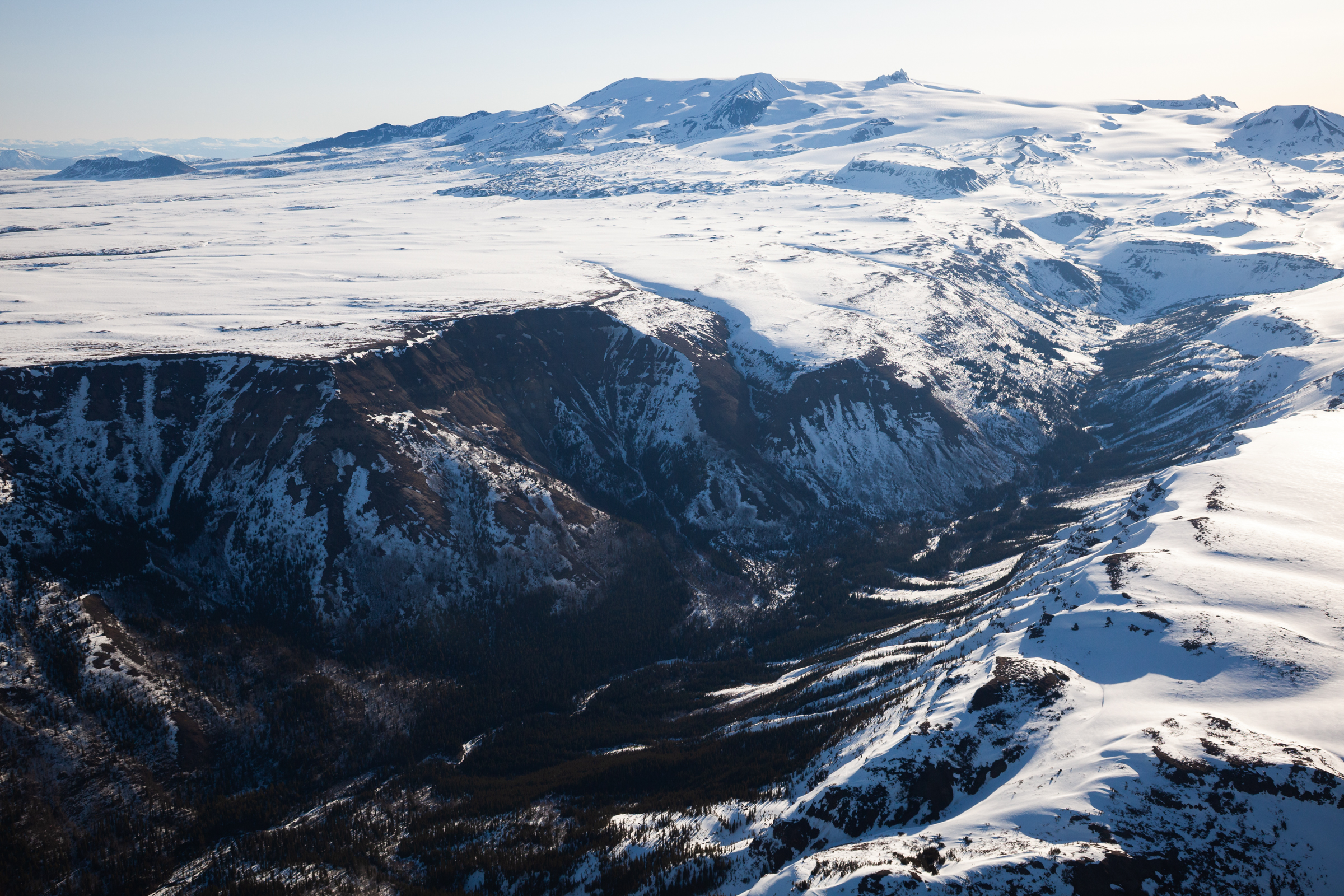
Sezill Canyon on the western side of the Big Raven Plateau

Basaltic lava flows of the 6.3-million-year-old Armadillo Formation are exposed in the Kadeya and Sezill canyons, as well as along the Mess Creek Escarpment where they overlie basaltic lava flows of the Raspberry Formation. Armadillo basalt flows form up to 180 m (590 ft) thick units at these locations where they are interbedded with air-fall pumice and ash flows of trachytic and comenditic compositions. The basalt flows were highly fluid and mobile at the time of their eruption as evidenced by their extreme persistence and relatively narrow thicknesses; individual basalt flows are less than 3 m (9.8 ft) thick. The source of these lava flows was probably a cluster of vents further to the east called Sezill Volcano. In contrast, the air-fall pumice and ash flows probably originated from the more than 4 km (2.5 mi) in diameter Armadillo Caldera south of the Big Raven Plateau.

==== Nido Formation ====
The Tenchen Member is the only stratigraphic unit of the Nido Formation forming the Big Raven Plateau. It consists of basaltic lava flows and pyroclastic rocks, which were erupted 4.4 million years ago from three major volcanoes and several smaller eruptive centres. Alkali basalt and minor hawaiite of the Alpha Peak, Beta Peak and associated satellitic eruptive centres are exposed on Sorcery Ridge and Idiji Ridge. They are in the form of lava flows, agglutinate, flow breccia, tuff breccia, pillow breccia and pillow lava, which are intercalated with gravel. Alkali basalt of the Gamma Peak eruptive centre is in the form of lava flows, tuff breccia and pillow lava. These volcanic deposits occur in the upper canyon of Elwyn Creek and overlie alkali basalt of the lower unit at the southeastern end of the plateau. All of the Tenchen Member eruptive centres have been deeply dissected by erosion, such that only isolated remnants remain. For example, Cartoona Peak and Kaia Bluff both consist of alkali basalt erupted from the Gamma Peak eruptive centre. A lower unit of alkali basalt with minor hawaiite is exposed at the southern, southeastern and southwestern ends of the plateau. At these locations, the alkali basalt is in the form of lava flows, flow breccia and agglutinate.

==== Pyramid Formation ====
Exposures of the 1.1-million-year-old Pyramid Formation are limited to the northeastern, eastern and southeastern ends of the Big Raven Plateau; these areas feature rhyolite and trachyte domes, flows and pyroclastic breccia. The Pyramid consists of a roughly 366 m (1,201 ft) high trachyte dome whose base is slightly more than 1 km (0.62 mi) wide. It differs from other domes of the Pyramid Formation in that it has only been moderately eroded and is completely isolated from adjacent rocks. Adjacent to The Pyramid is Sphinx Dome, a partially buried rhyolite dome whose southern edge has been largely destroyed by headward stream erosion. Isolated remnants of the rhyolitic Pharaoh Dome occur along the eastern and southeastern ends of the plateau between Tennaya Creek in the north and Cartoona Ridge in the south. A series of basaltic lava flows up to 65 m (213 ft) thick overlies a trachytic pyroclastic surge deposit south and east of The Pyramid, both of which are also part of the Pyramid Formation.

==== Ice Peak Formation ====
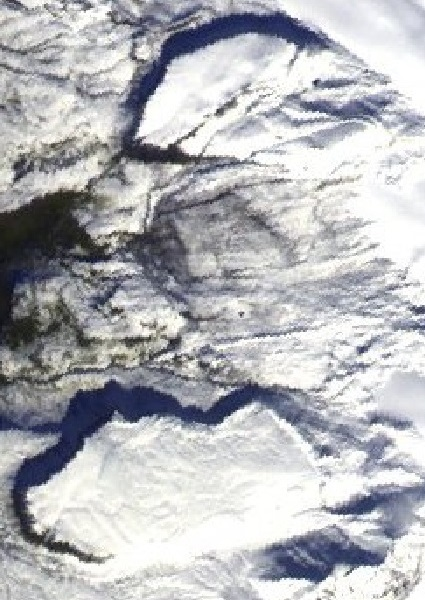
The Ornostay and Koosick bluffs of the Ice Peak Formation

The Ice Peak Formation is the most compositionally diverse geological formation of the Big Raven Plateau, having mostly erupted from Ice Peak about one million years ago. Most of the Ice Peak Formation is subdivided into two distinct stratigraphic units: the lower and upper assemblages. The lower assemblage consists of alkali basalt and hawaiite, as well as minor mugearite, tristanite and trachybasalt. These rocks are in the form of subaerial lava flows, pyroclastic breccia, sideromelane tuff breccia, pillow breccia and pillow lava. The lower assemblage is widespread throughout the plateau, but is largely buried under colluvium.

Alkali basalt, trachybasalt, tristanite, mugearite, benmoreite and trachyte of the upper assemblage compose lava flows, domes and pyroclastic breccia. They form the summit of Ice Peak and are exposed to the south and northeast along the southeastern and eastern sides of the Big Raven Plateau. The Ornostay and Koosick bluffs on the western flank of Ice Peak consist of thick lobes of upper assemblage trachyte. Both bluffs owe their thicknesses from the ponding of molten trachyte lava against glacial ice when the plateau was overlain by a regional ice sheet.

Camp Hill consists of basaltic tuff breccia, pillow breccia, lava flows and tephra of the upper assemblage. It is considered to be part of the Ice Peak Formation because it is believed to have formed contemporarily with the Ice Peak volcano. Lava from Camp Hill extends to the northwest along the southwestern edge of the Big Raven Plateau, but it is almost completely buried under colluvium deposits. Small exposures of this lava occur along the Mess Creek Escarpment and along Taweh Valley just south of Hoia Bluff.

==== Pillow Ridge Formation ====
The 0.9-million-year-old Pillow Ridge Formation is limited to the Pillow and Tsekone ridges. Pillow Ridge consists of alkali basalt that is in the form of tuff breccia, pillow breccia and pillow lava. The tuff breccia is crudely bedded and forms much of the lower and central portions of the ridge. Overlying the tuff breccia is an outer mantle of tubular pillow lava, which occurs at the northwestern and southeastern ends of Pillow Ridge. In contrast, Tsekone Ridge consists of a lower and central unit of tuff breccia and an upper unit of fractured, closely jointed pillows and lava tubes of hawaiitic composition. All of the Tsekone Ridge units are cut by vertical north-trending dikes, which fed the tuff breccia and pillow lava forming the ridge. The Pillow and Tsekone ridges are both products of subglacial volcanism, but they differ in glass alteration and vesicular texture; this suggests that they both formed under slightly different conditions.

==== Edziza Formation ====
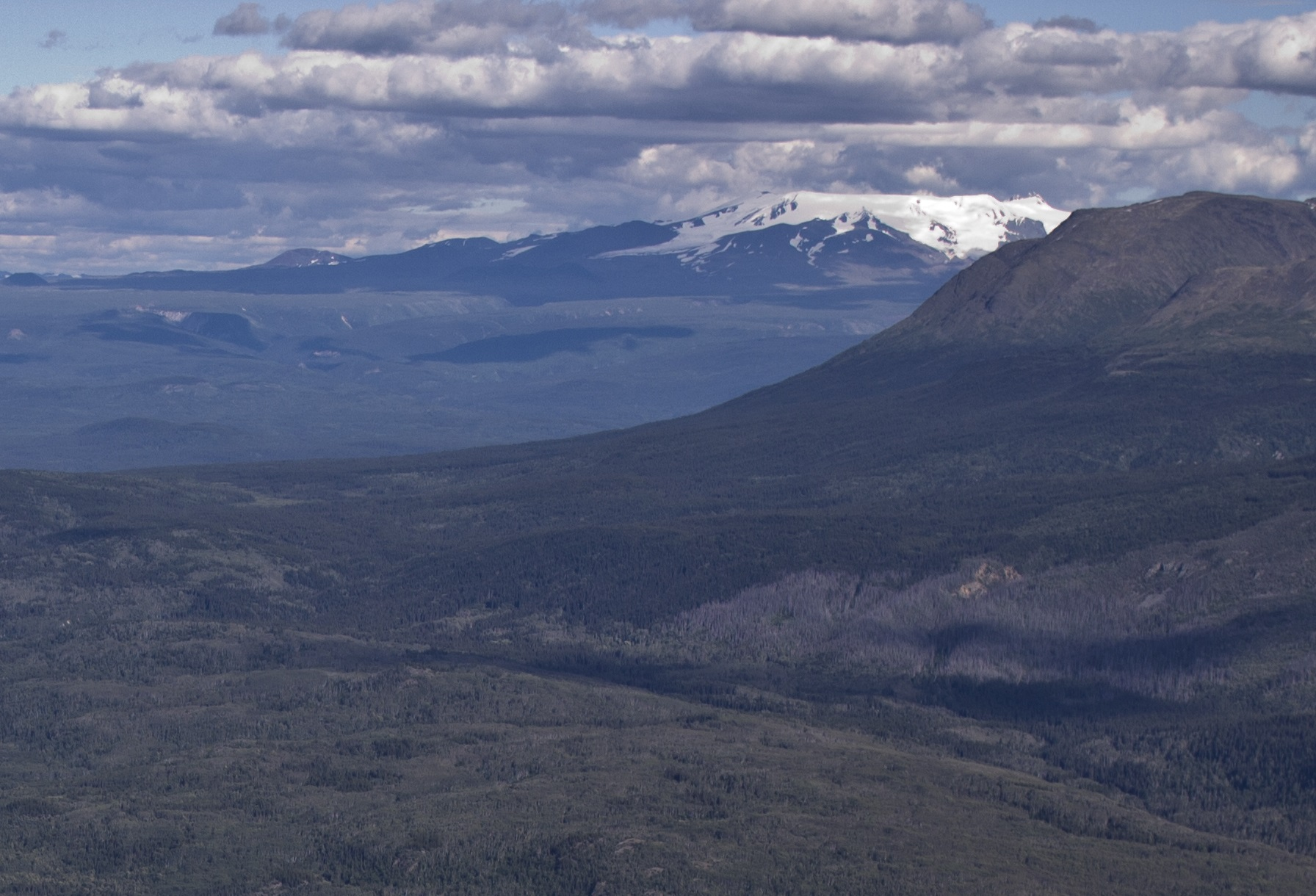
Mount Edziza as seen from Mount Glenora in the northwest

The Edziza Formation is a 0.9-million-year-old trachyte formation mainly forming the younger central stratovolcano of Mount Edziza and associated satellitic domes. It overlies the northern flank of the older Ice Peak stratovolcano and consists of pyroclastic breccia, as well as lahar and ash flow deposits. These rocks are well exposed in 850 m (2,790 ft) high cliffs along the northern side of Tenchen Glacier where an active cirque has eroded the eastern side of the volcano. Exposed at the head of this cirque is hydrothermally altered vent breccia of the central conduit. It is overlain by the remains of at least four lava lakes that ponded inside the summit crater. Each lava lake has a thickness of around 30 m (98 ft) and are represented by at least four distinct cooling units.

Satellitic domes of the Edziza Formation include the Glacier, Nanook and Triangle domes. Glacier Dome on the northern flank of Mount Edziza was the source of a lava flow that travelled along the northern side of Pyramid Valley. Nanook Dome lies on the southwestern rim of the central crater and may have been the source of one or two of the lava lakes. Triangle Dome on the upper western flank of Mount Edziza contains long, slender columnar joints that have been attributed to subglacial volcanism. An unnamed pyroclastic cone on the northwestern flank of Mount Edziza, also part of the Edziza Formation, produced two trachytic lava flows. They travelled onto the gently sloping surface of the Big Raven Plateau and are largely buried under ash and colluvium deposits.

==== Klastline Formation ====
The Klastline Formation consists of thick alkali basalt flows that issued from at least three vents on the northern and eastern sides of the Big Raven Plateau 0.62 million years ago. A lobe of alkali basalt extends eastward from the northern end of the plateau to Buckley Lake as a series of scattered outcrops; much of the lobe is buried under colluvium deposits and younger lava flows. The source of this lobe was probably a pyroclastic cone that has been eroded to a low grassy hill 1,220 m (4,000 ft) in elevation. Klastline Cone on the eastern side of the plateau near the head of Pyramid Creek was the main source of Klastline Formation lava flows in the Klastline Valley. Erosion has since reduced these lava flows to small buttes and buttresses along the Klastline River.

==== Kakiddi Formation ====
The 0.3-million-year-old Kakiddi Formation east and west of Tencho Glacier on the southern flank of Ice Peak consists mainly of trachytic pyroclastic rocks and lava flows. Punch Cone on the southwestern flank of Ice Peak is a roughly 1 km (0.62 mi) long, steep-sided ridge composed of agglutinated Kakiddi spatter and breccia. It was the source of a largely buried lava flow that extends westward onto the gently sloping surface of the Big Raven Plateau. Erosional remnants of thick Kakiddi lava flows and pyroclastic rocks to the east occur on Ice Peak and in valleys on the eastern side of the plateau. The remnants on Ice Peak originated from a vent near its summit whereas those in the adjacent valleys originated from unknown vents. However, Nanook Dome on the summit of Mount Edziza may have been a major source; it consists of similar Edziza Formation trachyte. Trachytic lava flows of the Kakiddi Formation erupted more fluidly than those of the Edziza Formation as evidenced by their greater extant on gently sloping terrain.

==== Big Raven Formation ====
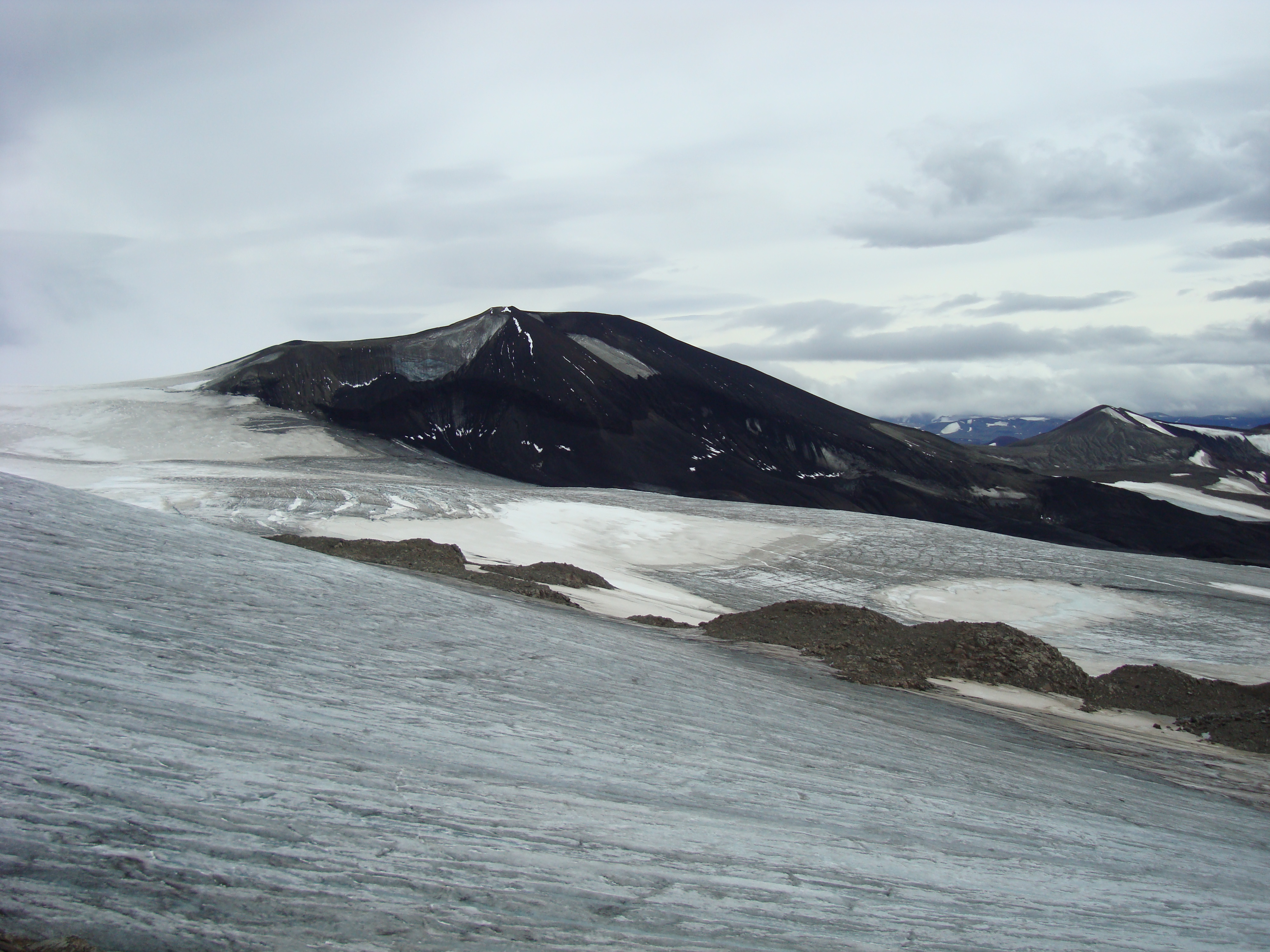
Tennena Cone in the Snowshoe Lava Field from the northwest

Alkali basalt and hawaiite of the Big Raven Formation is widespread at the northern and southern ends of the Big Raven Plateau. The largest occurrences of these rocks are the Desolation and Snowshoe lava fields at the northern and southern ends of the plateau. Radiocarbon dating of willow twigs preserved within tephra from Williams Cone in the Desolation Lava Field has yielded an age of 1340 ± 130 years. Kana Cone on the extreme northern slope of the plateau is the northernmost occurrence of Big Raven Formation alkali basalt and hawaiite. It was the source of lava flows that forced the Klastline River against the northern valley wall.

The Walkout Creek centres on the extreme southern slope of the Big Raven Plateau are also part of the Big Raven Formation. They consist of the remains of two small cinder cones and associated alkali basaltic lava flows. Icefall Cone, Cinder Cliff and Ridge Cone on the eastern flank of Mount Edziza are three isolated Big Raven Formation basaltic eruptive centres. The Big Raven Formation also includes the Sheep Track Member, a pyroclastic fall deposit of comenditic trachyte pumice. It obscurs much of the surficial details of the Snowshoe Lava Field.

=== Basement ===
As a part of the Mount Edziza volcanic complex, the Big Raven Plateau is underlain by the Stikinia terrane. This is a suite of Paleozoic and Mesozoic volcanic, sedimentary and metamorphic rocks that accreted (Note: Accretion is the process by which terranes are added to a continent, resulting in continental growth.) to the continental margin of North America during the Jurassic. These rocks are exposed along the western side of the plateau in Mess Valley and along the southern side in the Walkout and Chakima valleys. They also occur along the eastern side of the plateau where they form the lower units of Idiji Ridge, Sorcery Ridge and other neighbouring ridges. At the extreme northern end of the plateau, these rocks form inliers.

Also underlying the Big Raven Plateau are Cretaceous and Paleocene rocks of the Sustut Group. This geological group consists of conglomerates, arkoses, siltstones, sandstones, shales and minor coal; they are exposed along the western side of the plateau. Leucogranite of the Eocene-age Elwyn Creek Pluton is exposed in Elwyn Canyon, as are Eocene rhyolite, dacite and andesite pyroclastic breccias. Lava domes and flows of Eocene age, also exposed in Elwyn Canyon, are mainly andesitic in composition. All of these Eocene rocks are part of the Sloko Group, which formed in a continental arc setting as early as the Late Cretaceous.

=== Geothermal activity ===
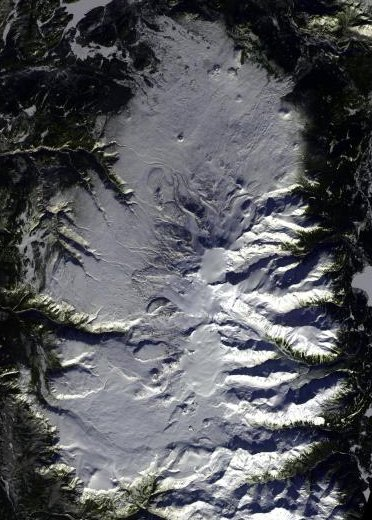
Snow-covered Big Raven Plateau

The Elwyn and Sezill canyons contain geothermal springs with water temperatures of 36 and 46 degrees Celsius (97 and 115 degrees Fahrenheit), respectively. Their discharge may be linked to shallow hydrothermal systems driven by residual magmatic heat as they are near recently active volcanic centres on the Big Raven Plateau. Geothermal springs in volcanic areas are rich in minerals; this is because the heated spring water dissolves the surrounding host rocks as it rises to the surface. Flow rate, flow path and the length of time the water is in contact with the surrounding rocks influence the amount of dissolved minerals present in volcanic springs.

==== Elwyn Creek springs ====
About 10 small hot and warm springs are present along the banks of Elwyn Creek at elevations of 1,350–1,450 m (4,430–4,760 ft). They occur adjacent to the base of the plateau where basalt of the Nido Formation overlies leucogranite comprising the Elwyn Creek Pluton. The Elwyn Hot Springs are above the timberline and contain clear and odourless water. However, because the water is highly concentrated with dissolved minerals such as sodium, calcium and bicarbonate, it has a slight mineral taste. The springs have varying discharge rates of 0.05 to 0.3 litres (0.011 to 0.066 imperial gallons; 0.013 to 0.079 US gallons) per second. They are 6 km (3.7 mi) west of a group of recently active cinder cones along the southern edge of the Desolation Lava Field.

Thick tufa deposits formed by the precipitation of calcite and aragonite from active and inactive vents occur on the southwest side of Elwyn Creek where they host a series of warm ponds. A small vent midway between Elwyn Creek and the easternmost pool has the highest recorded water temperature of 36 degrees Celsius (97 degrees Fahrenheit). Discharge on the opposite side of Elwyn Creek has resulted in the creation of a few warm springs.

==== Sezill Creek springs ====
About 7 km (4.3 mi) upstream from the Taweh Creek junction, the banks of Sezill Creek are lined with small warm pools and about eight hot and warm springs for more than 500 m (1,600 ft). They are adjacent to the base of the plateau where basalt of the Armadillo Formation overlies basement rocks. The springs contain odourless water that is highly concentrated with mainly silica, sodium, bicarbonate and calcium. Therefore, the water discharging from the Sezill Creek springs has a pronounced soda-mineral taste. A discharge rate of about 0.5 litres (0.11 imperial gallons; 0.13 US gallons) per second has been recorded for the principal vent, which has a water temperature of 46 °C (115 °F). The springs are about 4 km (2.5 mi) northwest of the edge of the Snowshoe Lava Field, which also contains recently active cinder cones. They have been referred to as the Taweh Hot Springs in literature, but according to BC Geographical Names, their official name is the Sezill Hot Springs. Sezill has its origins from a word meaning "it is hot" in the Tahltan language.

Tufa deposits associated with these springs are present on both sides of Sezill Creek. However, the most extensive deposits occur on the north bank of Sezill Creek where the principal vent lies within a couple of metres from the stream. Also on the north side of Sezill Creek is a mushroom-shaped, tufa deposit topped by a small pool fed by a jet of 43 °C (109 °F) carbonated water. The tufa is characterized by multiple hues of grey, orange, brown and white. About 100 m (330 ft) downstream from this deposit is another vent discharging 46 °C (115 °F) water on the south side of Sezill Creek.

=== Volcanic hazards ===
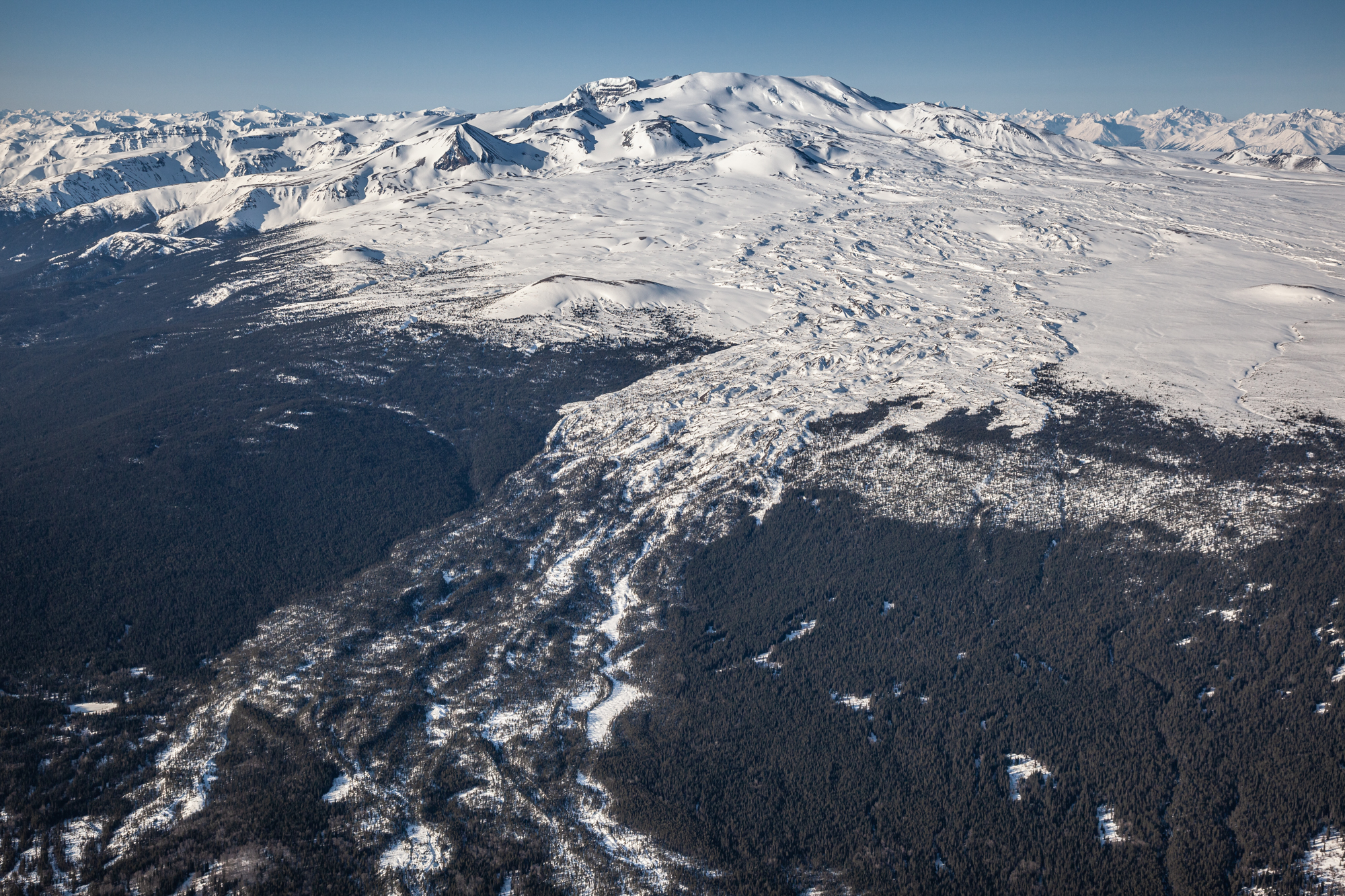
Williams Cone lava flow descending the northeastern side of the Big Raven Plateau

Renewed effusive eruptions in the Desolation and Snowshoe lava fields could produce highly fluid basaltic lava flows that may enter local streams to form lava dams. The fluidity of these lava flows is due to their low silica content, such that they are capable of travelling more than 10 km (6.2 mi) from their source. Evidence for past damming is present in the valleys of Kakiddi Creek and the Klastline River; both streams have etched new channels around or through lava flows to expose beds of lake silt further upstream. The ignition of forest fires by lava eruptions is also a possibility since the lower slopes of the Big Raven Plateau are vegetated. More silica-rich trachytic and rhyolitic lavas have issued from Mount Edziza, which are associated with explosive eruptions due to their high viscosities. The eruption of highly viscous lava can result in the formation of domes; these bulbous mounds can collapse to create pyroclastic flows.

The possibility of renewed explosive activity at Mount Edziza is highlighted by the Sheep Track Member, which was deposited by an explosive eruption around 950 CE. If explosive volcanism were to resume, an ash column could be released into the atmosphere which would affect parts of northwestern Canada. Ash columns can drift for thousands of kilometres downwind and often become increasingly spread out over a larger area with increasing distance from an erupting vent. Mount Edziza lies under a major air route from Vancouver, British Columbia to Whitehorse, Yukon, suggesting that the volcano poses a potential threat to air traffic. Volcanic ash reduces visibility and can cause jet engine failure, as well as damage to other aircraft systems.

== Name and etymology ==
The name of the plateau became official on January 2, 1980. It was adopted on the National Topographic System map 104G after being submitted to the BC Geographical Names office by the Geological Survey of Canada. The Big Raven Plateau is named after Big Raven, a deity in Tahltan mythology whose name translates to Tse'sketco in the Tahltan language. Several features on the plateau also have names with Tahltan roots that were adopted simultaneously on 104G for geology reporting purposes; among them are Keda Cone, Hoia Bluff, Sidas Cone, Tsekone Ridge, Kaia Bluff and Kana Cone.

== Accessibility ==
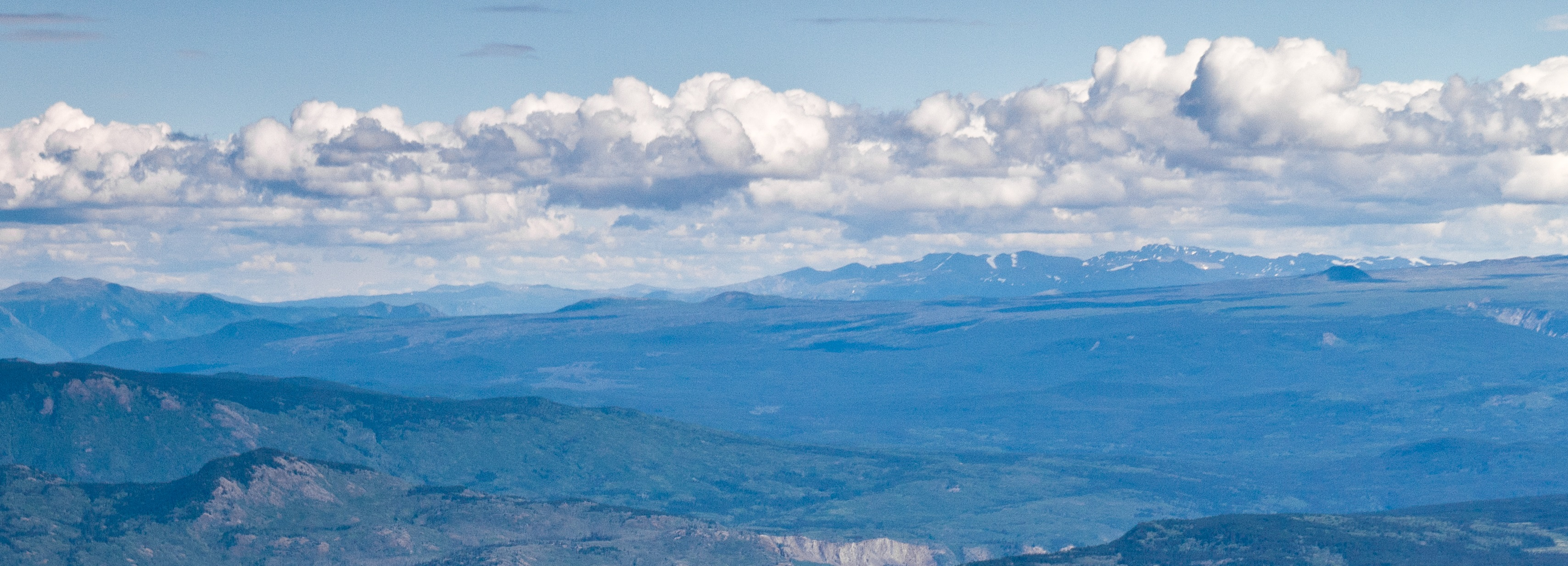
A panorama of the northern end of the Big Raven Plateau. Eve Cone is visible as a small dark hill to the centre-right.

The closest roads to the Big Raven Plateau are the Stewart–Cassiar Highway to the east and the Telegraph Creek Road to the northwest; both come within 40 km (25 mi) of the plateau. Extending from these roads are horse trails that provide access to the plateau. From Telegraph Creek, the Buckley Lake Trail extends about 15 km (9.3 mi) southeast along Mess Creek and Three Mile Lake. It then traverses about 15 km (9.3 mi) northeast along Dagaichess Creek and Stinking Lake to the northeastern end of Buckley Lake. Here, it meets with the Klastline River Trail and the Buckley Lake to Mowdade Lake Route, the latter of which ascends onto the gently sloping northern side of the plateau.

To the east, the roughly 50 km (31 mi) long Klastline River Trail begins at the community of Iskut on the Stewart–Cassiar Highway; it extends northwest and west along the Klastline River for much of its length. The trail enters Mount Edziza Provincial Park at about 25 km (16 mi) where Kakiddi Creek drains into the Klastline River. After entering Mount Edziza Provincial Park, it traverses northwest along the Klastline River for about 10 km (6.2 mi) and then crosses the river north of the Big Raven Plateau. From there, it traverses west for about 5 km (3.1 mi) to the northeastern end of Buckley Lake where it meets with the Buckley Lake Trail and the Buckley Lake to Mowdade Lake Route.

The Big Raven Plateau can also be accessed via charter aircraft from Dease Lake and Tatogga Lake, the latter of which is near the community of Iskut. Buckley Lake to the northwest, Nuttlude Lake to the east and the Kakiddi, Mowchilla and Mowdade lakes to the southeast are large enough to be used by float-equipped aircraft. Landing on the Buckley and Mowchilla lakes with a private aircraft requires a letter of authorization from the BC Parks Stikine Senior Park Ranger. Alpine Lakes Air and BC Yukon Air are the only air charter companies permitted to provide access to this area via aircraft.

== See also ==
- List of plateaus in British Columbia
