= Quikinna'qu =

Quikinna'qu or Kutkinnaku is a chief deity of the Koryak mythology, part of the wider Siberian mythology. Quikinna'qu is depicted as a shapeshifting god or spirit that taught humans to hunt, fish and make fire.

== Name ==
Quikinna'qu and Kutkinnaku are terms of the Koryak language, which mean big raven. Quikinna'qu is also known by the names Acicenaqu which means big grandfather and Tenantomwan, which means creator. The name Tenantomwan is a misnomer, because Quikinna'qu isn't a creator deity.

== See also ==
- Ku'urkil
