= Chris Kientz =

American-Canadian animator

Chris Kientz is an American/Canadian writer, animator, television producer, director and educator. He has worked on a number of reality TV and children's television series but is perhaps best known for his ongoing work on the award-winning Canadian/American television series, Raven Tales. His animation has also appeared at the Smithsonian Institution as well as animation festivals worldwide. He is a board member of Kids First!, a children's media advocacy organization, and the 2009 winner of the Kids First! PalmerVision award.

He is also known as a writer for a 56-book series based on First Nations' trickster stories, written along with David Bouchard. He worked closely with Tribal Elders in the creation of these books for Scholastic. He is currently writing a history-based series for the Smithsonian Institution called Secret Smithsonian. He also continues his work in program development, specifically for healthcare, coordinating project design and business development, as well as concentrating on research of new methods of digital distribution of media and interactive systems, including VR.

As an educator, he worked at the Creative Media Institute at New Mexico State University to develop and implement the CMI animation program, including fundraising efforts and development of the animation curriculum and admission process. In addition, he is a senior consultant for National Geographic, working with the All Roads Film Project as a fundraiser and project judge to ensure that children of underrepresented minorities receive media-based educational materials and media training.

He has written articles and textbooks on digital media and applications for digital media in entertainment, education, and distribution.

In addition, he has done notable work on the research and development of interactive content for defense-based security training as a program manager at the Training and Doctrine Command Analysis Center at White Sands Missile Range. His work at Los Alamos and Sandia Labs included early VR and AR approaches to training and visualization, as well as early warning chemical analysis sensor systems.

He formerly served on the New Mexico Governor's Council on Film and Media Industries to advise on digital media and tax incentives for media production and post-production.
