= Aderyn y Corff =

Bird from Welsh folklore who portends death

Creature information
- Other name(s): lit. transl. corpse bird
- Similar entities: Ravens; Púca
- Folklore: Legend

Origin
- Country: Wales

The Aderyn y Corff (Welsh for 'corpse bird'; sometimes also known as Aderyn corff or Deryn corff, or archaically Aderyn y Corph) is a bird from Welsh folklore who portends death. It is said to chirp outside a soon-to-be deceased person's door with a cry that sounds similar to dewch (Welsh for 'come'). The bird has no feathers or wings. When not calling outside of a person's door, it is said to live on another plane of existence.

The Aderyn y Corff is referenced twice in the Welsh-language version of the bible, which some authors have claimed is the origin of the superstition. Many contemporary accounts of the corpse bird have suggested that it is actually a screech owl, drawn to lights coming from the room of a patient.
