= Corvus in popular culture =

Birds of the genus corvus, most notably crows and ravens, have appeared numerous times in culture.

- Cultural depictions of crows
- Cultural depictions of ravens

== See also ==
Rook (bird)#Relationship with humans
