= Raven Banner Penny =

Coin of the Norse-Gael Olaf Sihtricson

York penny, 941-944 AD
"Raven Banner Penny"

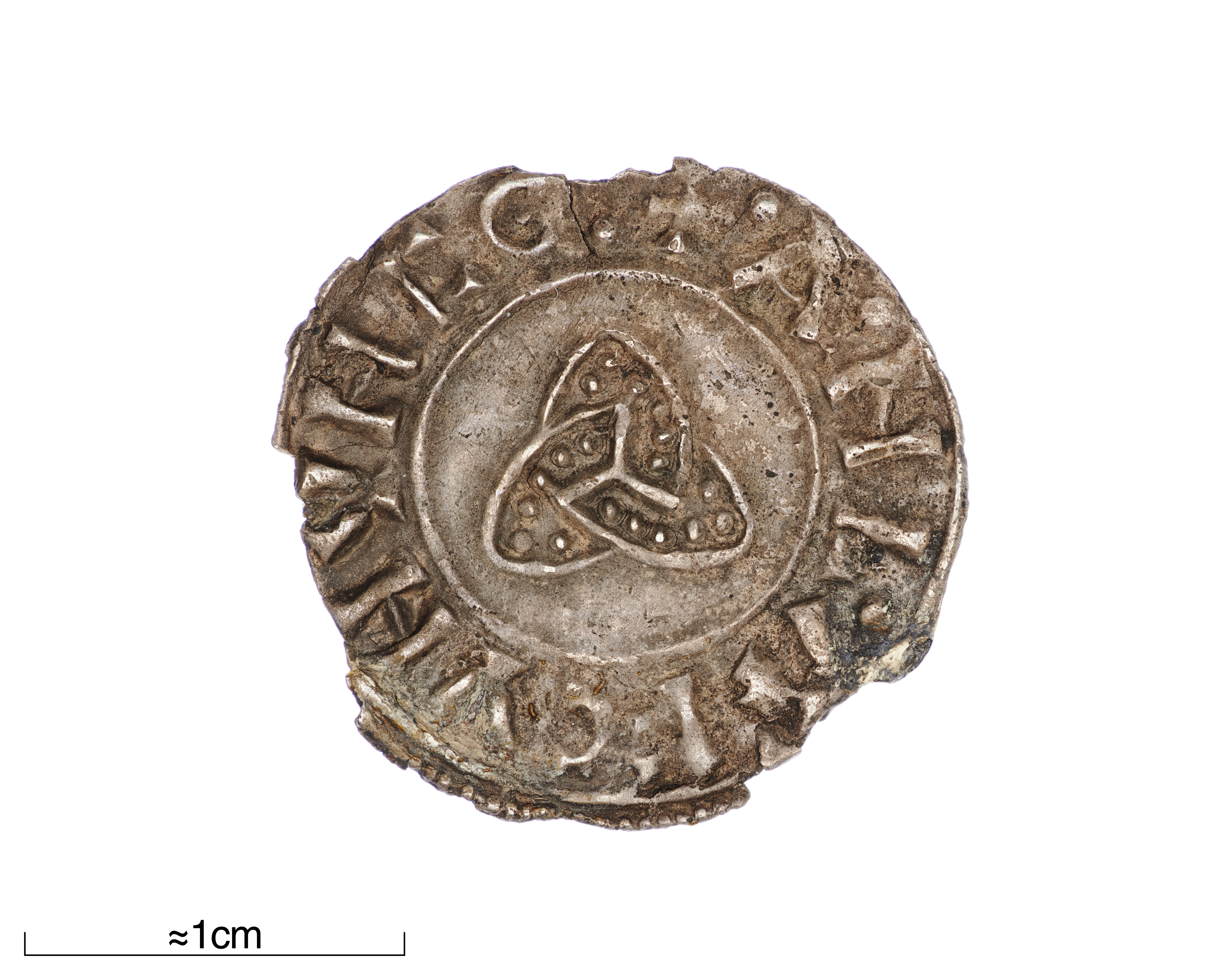
Obverse legend: ANLAF CVNVNC (Olaf king).

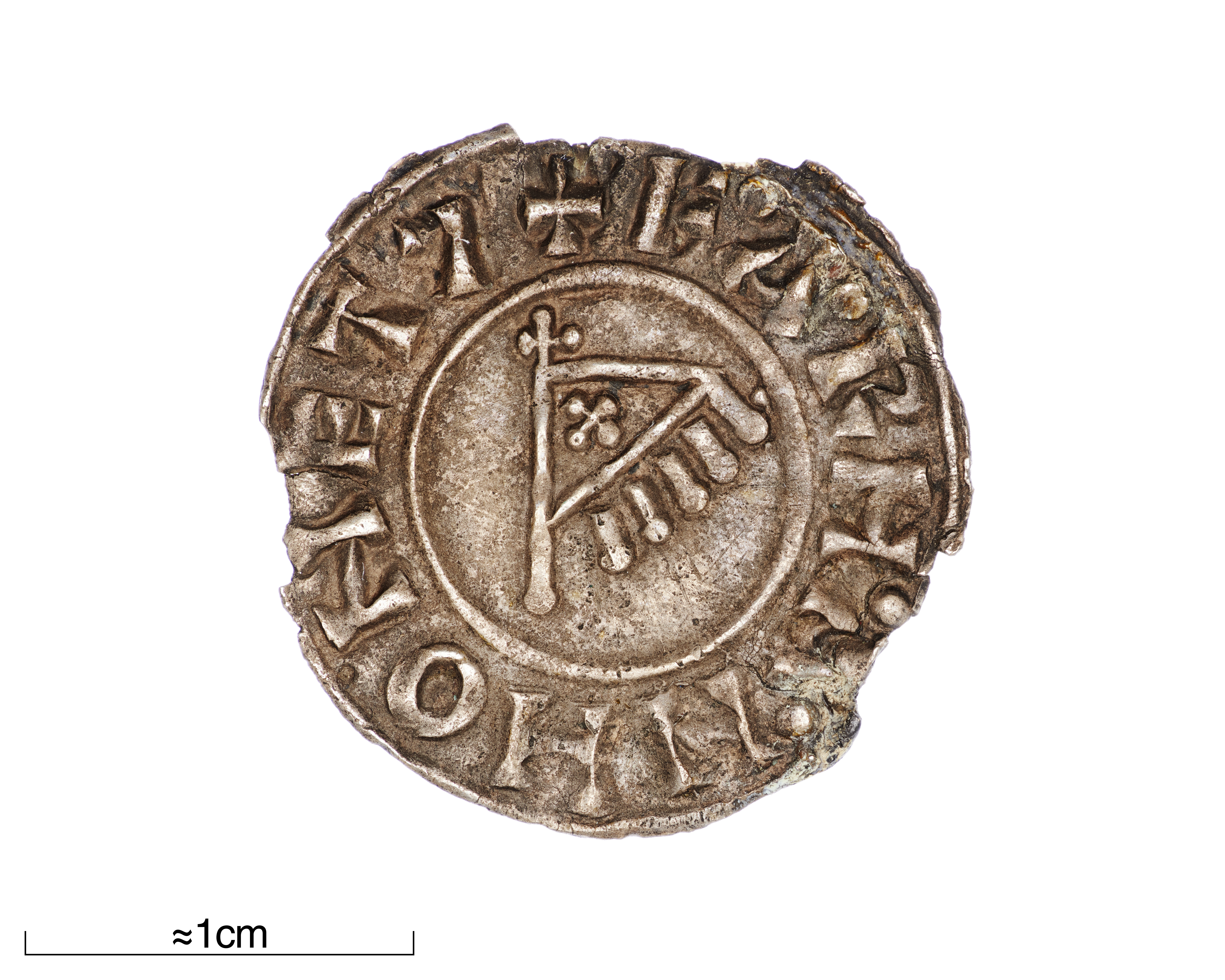
Reverse legend: FARMAN MONETA (Farman moneyer).

The erroneously nicknamed "Raven Banner Penny", is a coin of the Norse-Gael Olaf Sihtricson, minted during his reign as the king of Jórvík between 941 and 944 AD (he later became the king of Dublin between 945-947 and 952-980 AD). The nickname stems from the coin's reverse image, which depicts a triangular banner (or vane) with a series of tassels or tabs running along the outer edge, which coincides with some descriptions of the raven banner, a viking war banner only known from description. Unlike the raven banner, however, the coin's banner features a cross instead of a raven. The obverse image instead depict a triquetra.

== History ==
Olaf Sihtricson, also called Amlaíb Cuarán (c. 927 – 981), was a 10th-century Norse-Gael who was King of Jórvík and Dublin. His byname, Cuarán, is usually translated as "sandal". He was the last of the Uí Ímair family to play a major part in the politics of the British Isles. The coins of Olaf Sihtricson were minted in the early 940s.

== Legend and images ==
The obverse image features triquetra and the encircled legend: ANLAF CVNVNC (CUNUNG), meaning "Olaf King". For the title, the Nordic word CVNVNC (Old Norse: ᚴᚢᚾᚢᚾᚴ, kunung) has been used instead of the Latin and otherwise completely dominant REX title ("regent"). It is one of the earliest known surviving texts in Old Norse written in the Latin alphabet.

The reverse image features a banner with a cross and the encircled legend: FARMAN MONETA (Latin for mint), meaning "Farman moneyer". The banner was quite triangular, with a rounded outside edge on which there hung a series of tabs or tassels. The end of the banner pole featured another cross or possibly a trefoil.

Banners were common war flags at the time and were used by various kings and other warlords during the 9th, 10th and 11th centuries.

== See also ==
- Raven Penny
- Curmsun Disc
- Scandinavian York
- Runes
- Cultural depictions of ravens
