= Cultural depictions of penguins =

Penguins are popular around the world for their unusually upright, waddling gait, their cuteness, their swimming ability and (compared with other birds) their lack of fear toward humans. Their striking black and white plumage is often likened to a white tie suit and generates humorous remarks about the bird being "well dressed".

Penguins had a resurgence as figures in pop culture in the mid-2000s thanks to films like March of the Penguins, Madagascar, Happy Feet, and Surf's Up. As an April Fools' Day joke, on April 1, 2008 the BBC released a short film of penguins in flight and migrating to the South American rainforest.

== Portrayals ==
The penguin is typically depicted as a friendly and comical figure, with considerable dignity despite its physical limitations. Perhaps in reaction to this cute stereotype, fictional penguins are sometimes presented as irritable or even sinister. Examples include the cute yet somewhat surly Sanrio character Badtz Maru and the penguins in the movie Madagascar, intelligent creatures with devious schemes and plans, who are even capable of defeating humans. Penguins are also often portrayed as friendly and smart, for example in the anime Neon Genesis Evangelion, which features a warm-water penguin named Pen Pen.

- The 1960s television cartoon character Tennessee Tuxedo would often escape the confines of his zoo with his partner, Chumley the walrus.
- In the online role-playing game RuneScape, penguins are portrayed as devious characters with a background reminiscent of the Soviet Union: their capital is Palingrad (suggesting Stalingrad); they have KGP (compare KGB) agents; and they refer to their homeland as the "Motherland". One quest in which they feature is called "Cold War" and the next is called "The Hunt for Red Raktuber", a play on The Hunt for Red October. They have an enormous military complex with training facilities, living areas, interrogation rooms and agility courses. They have plans for domination similar to the penguins in Madagascar.
- In the animated series Wallace and Gromit, a penguin called Feathers McGraw disguises himself as a chicken with a red rubber glove.
- A villain in the DC Comics Universe is called The Penguin.

== Mythology ==
Yellow-eyed, Fiordland and little penguins are prominent in Māori mythology, where they are known as hoiho, tawaki and kororā respectively. The tawaki in particular is associated with a myth in which it walked among humans until it revealed its divinity by wearing lightning, hence the explanation for the bird's yellow crest.

== Logos and mascots ==
The friendly, slightly comical image of the penguin has often been used by companies and organisations for logos and mascots.

- Theta Phi Alpha fraternity uses a penguin as their mascot.
- Penguins give their name to the Pittsburgh Penguins (mascot's name: "Iceburgh" former mascot: "Penguin Pete") of the National Hockey League, their farm team, the Wilkes-Barre/Scranton Penguins and the sports teams of Youngstown State University (mascot's name: "Pete").
- The school mascot of the New England Conservatory of Music (Boston, MA) is the Fighting Penguin.
- The penguin is an unofficial mascot of Carleton College and its library.
- The mascot of North Otago Rugby Football Union is Bluey the penguin, reflecting two penguin colonies located in Oamaru, one of which is of Blue penguins.
- Diego the penguin is the mascot of Diegos Tartan Army, based in Inverness. Named after soccer player Diego Maradona, he was adopted in Lithuania by members of the Tartan Army, who follow the Scottish football team abroad.
- The Penguin is the mascot of choice for the British-American Rock Band Fleetwood Mac, and was the name of the first of two albums from 1973. (see Penguin)
- Tencent QQ has a logo featuring a penguin.
- Tux the penguin is used as a symbol of Linux. The original image of Tux was drawn by Larry Ewing. Tux is often depicted, in a variety of different attire, in different Linux distributions and programs that feature him as a mascot. He also features in many video games, along with female counterparts Penny and Gown.
- Penguin Vic was a character created to promote tourism in Victoria, Australia, as part of a campaign initiated in 1997.
- Sir Nils Olav, a king penguin living in Edinburgh Zoo, Scotland, is also the mascot of the Royal Norwegian Guard and their titular colonel-in-chief.
- Penguin Books, a publisher of paperback books, uses a penguin in its name and logo.
- Penguen (Turkish for penguin), a Turkish satirical magazine, uses a penguin in its logo.

== Politics ==
- Supporters and collaborators of Argentine president Néstor Kirchner are known informally as pingüinos, and pingüino (Spanish for "penguin") is the nickname of Kirchner himself, alluding to his birthplace in the cold southern region of Patagonia.
- In 2009, the vice-chair of The Democratic Alliance for the Betterment and Progress of Hong Kong (DAB), a pro-Beijing party in Hong Kong, hosted an episode of an opinion talk show, in the opening of which he mistakenly began by describing the North Pole as a place with few people and many penguins. Although this was edited out in reruns of the episode, it had already caught the attention many supporters of democracy, and they ridiculed the vice-chair and the entire DAB for it, saying that it is common knowledge that penguins are native to only the south, and that if the next generation of party leaders should have such poor general knowledge, it would be questionable for them to lead Hong Kong. This was but one in a long series of incidents that drew ridicule and criticism to the DAB.
- Penguins became the symbol of the 2013 protests in Turkey, after CNN Türk broadcast a documentary about penguins during the protests.

== Food items ==
- Penguin is a brand of chocolate biscuit manufactured by McVitie's.
- Kid Cuisine uses a penguin named K.C. Penguin as its mascot.
- Penguin Mints is a brand of caffeinated mints.

== Penguins and polar bears ==
Despite what commercials and other popular sources may show, penguins and polar bears are found on opposite hemispheres. Polar bears inhabit the Northern Hemisphere, while all penguin species live in the Southern Hemisphere.

== Literature ==
- Three children's books by Janet Perlman – The Tender Tale of Cinderella Penguin, The Emperor Penguin's New Clothes and The Penguin and the Pea – retell classic children's stories using penguin characters. Perlman also wrote the satirical graphic novel Penguins Behind Bars.
- Opus the Penguin is the main character of the eponymous Opus (comic strip) comic strip and an important character of the Bloom County comic strip, both by Berkeley Breathed.
- Pondus the Penguin is the eponymous main character in a 1968 photographed Danish children's book by Ivar Myrhøj.
- The children's book Mr. Popper's Penguins by Richard & Florence Atwater tells the story of Mr. Popper and his twelve performing penguins.
- Penguin Island is a satirical fictional history by Anatole France.
- At the Mountains of Madness by H. P. Lovecraft features giant blind albino penguins around an underground sea in Antarctica.
- And Tango Makes Three by Justin Richardson and Peter Parnell, illustrated by Henry Cole, is the true story of a penguin chick raised by two males at the Central Park Zoo in New York.
- Gus and Waldo's Book of Love features the eponymous gay penguins who are in love with one another.
- The bestselling business self-help book Our Iceberg is Melting: Changing and Succeeding Under Any Conditions by John Kotter and Holger Rathberger concerns a colony of emperor penguins struggle to organize a solution to the reality that their iceberg habitat is in danger of melting by the end of the season. The penguins in the story act human and have human names. The story is presented as a fable for demonstrating Kotter's Eight Steps Change model.
- 365 Penguins is a 2006 children's picture book by Jean-Luc Fromental and illustrated by Joelle Jolivet.
- Penguin is a 2007 children's picture book written and illustrated by Polly Dunbar.
- Penguin Highway is a juvenile science fiction novel written by Tomihiko Morimi and published in 2010. The novel was adapted into an animated film by Studio Colorido in 2018. Penguins are portrayed as a system that repairs three-dimensional holes in the universe.

== Film and television ==
=== Feature films and animation ===
- In the major animated sequence of the 1964 film, Mary Poppins, Mary and Bert are served by a group of overeager penguin waiters. Afterwards, Bert has an extended dance sequence with them, soon lowering his trousers to imitate their stubby legs.
- A 1971 Sesame Street animation by John and Faith Hubley on the subject of rhythm depicts a penguin tap-dancing on an ice floe to the diverse rhythms of a drum, a knock on a door, a saw, and a typewriter, and receiving applause from Antarctic seals.
- One of the main villains of the 1992 movie Batman Returns is the Penguin. In the film, the Penguin is raised by penguins and forms an army of penguins to attack Gotham City. Their equipment included back-mounted rockets and laser eye sights. The Penguin also appears in The Batman vs Dracula: The Animated Movie and Batman: Mystery of the Batwoman.
- The Paz Show
- In Fight Club, the Narrator's "power animal" is a talking king penguin.
- The direct-to-video film The Little Mermaid II: Return to the Sea features a penguin named Tip.
- In Toy Story 2, Woody is stolen from a yard sale when he attempts to rescue Wheezy, Andy's squeaky penguin toy.
- In 50 First Dates, a 2004 romantic comedy, the character portrayed by Adam Sandler has a pet penguin named Willie.
- The movie Billy Madison featured a penguin that was a nemesis of the title character in hallucinations.
- In the movie Gregory's Girl, there is a background running gag involving a child in a penguin costume wandering around the school and being directed from place to place.
- The 2004 science fiction movie Alien vs. Predator also features Humboldt penguins with one of them startling Graeme Miller.
- Happy Feet, Happy Feet Two and Surf's Up are three popular movies on penguins.
- The 1995 film The Pebble and the Penguin features Hubie and Marina.
- Cats Don't Dance features Peabo "Pudge" Pudgemyer.
- The Madagascar Penguins in a Christmas Caper is an animated short produced by DreamWorks Animation. The 12-minute Madagascar spin-off features the adventures of four penguins, sometimes known as the Madagascar penguins, who live in the Central Park Zoo and are trained as spies.
- The 2014 film Penguins of Madagascar features four anthropomorphised penguins as central characters.
- Mr. Popper's Penguins is a 2011 American comedy family film directed by Mark Waters, and starring Jim Carrey.
- The main character in Sergio Corbuccis' Spaghetti Western Vamos a matar, compañeros is nicknamed penguin for ridicule.

=== Short films ===
- Janet Perlman's film adaptation of her children's book The Tender Tale of Cinderella Penguin was nominated for an Academy Award for Best Animated Short Film at the 54th Academy Awards and received a Parents' Choice Award. Her one-hour screen adaptation of her graphic novel Penguins Behind Bars was adapted as a 2003 National Film Board of Canada animated short.

=== Television ===
- 3-2-1 Penguins! created by Big Idea Productions.
- Playboy Penguin created by Chuck Jones.
- Japanese-Soviet cartoon The Adventures of Lolo the Penguin.
- Pingu is a television show revolving around a penguin community.
- Ice King from Adventure Time has a group of penguins, all named variations of "Gunter" and who quack like ducks. One of them, in particular, is particularly mischievous.
- Pinky Penguin is an anthropomorphic emperor penguin who is the literary agent of Bojack Horseman. He is portrayed by Patton Oswalt.
- Penguins of several species appear in Shirokuma Cafe.
- In the second part of the 2nd episode of anime series Urusei Yatsura. Penguins' appearance in school is just the start of a full day of panic.
- Break from Beast Wars Neo has an alternate mode of an emperor penguin.
- In the DuckTales TV Series episode "Cold Ducks," part four of the TV Movie "Treasure of the Golden Suns," the ducks in that series encounter penguins.
- In The Sopranos episode "Army of One", Uncle Junior and Tony Soprano reflect on an incident where, as a child, Jackie Aprile Jr. had nearly drowned in three inches of water at a penguin exhibit.
- In the anime series Neon Genesis Evangelion, the character Misato Katsuragi has a genetically engineered penguin named Pen-pen as a pet.
- In the season 2 episode "Pawnee Zoo" of the American comedy television series Parks and Recreation, Leslie Knope marries two male penguins becoming an accidental same-sex marriage advocate. The penguins move to Ohio where their lifestyle choices are more accepted.
- In Juken Sentai Gekiranger (later adapted to Power Rangers: Jungle Fury), Penguin Zord appeared in the first time.
- CNN Türk showed a documentary about penguins as a form of misinformation during the Gezi Park protests.
- The Walter Lantz cartoon character Chilly Willy.
- The BanG Dream! It's MyGO!!!!! character Tomori Takamatsu has a special interest in penguins. In December 2024, a newborn king penguin from Xpark, an aquarium in Taiwan, was officially named "Tomorin" after an online name voting event.

== Theatre ==
- In the 2015 musical, Love Birds the penguins (played by humans) "Parker", "Presley", "Pewcey" and "Puck" comprise a penguin barbershop quartet.

== Video games ==
- The Penguin Suit is a powerup found in New Super Mario Bros. Wii, New Super Mario Bros. U and New Super Luigi U. It has a higher speed compared to running and has revolutionized speedruns in New Super Mario Bros. Wii.
- Penguins are the main theme for the massively multiplayer online game Club Penguin and its successor, Club Penguin Island, which both revolve around a virtual world where the players control one or more cartoon penguins.
- Chill Penguin is a character in the Mega Man X series, he is a robot based on a penguin and one of the eight boss characters in the first game of the series.
- Similarly, The massively multiplayer online game Cosmic Break features penguin-based robots called Pepens.
- The two protagonists of Binary Land are penguins named Gurin and Malon.
- Some species of Pokémon are based on penguins, namely Delibird, Iron Bundle, the Piplup evolutionary line (Piplup, Prinplup, Empoleon), and Eiscue.
- Penguins appear semi-frequently as enemies in the PlayStation game Crash Bandicoot 2: Cortex Strikes Back. A single penguin named Penta appears in the subsequent games in the series, Crash Bandicoot: Warped and Crash Team Racing.
- The title character of Pengo is a penguin.
- King Dedede of Kirby is based on a penguin.
- Tucks, common enemies in Donkey Kong Country: Tropical Freeze, appear to be based on penguins.

== Podcasts ==
- A feature of a new podcast series hosted by two former Ireland national rugby union team players Andrew Trimble & Barry Murphy (rugby union), named Penguins & Potholes. A penguin can be described as a bit of a super fan who will walk up to or engage with an idol either in the street or online, much to the annoyance of the idol.

== Other ==
- Scientists who had reported 2020 possible signs of life in the clouds of the planet Venus stated that the found biosignature phosphine is found on Earth and among others produced by penguins. Subsequently some public news reports and public responses wrongly cited the scientists' interest in the processes that create phosphine, suggesting that penguins lived in the clouds of Venus. The Planetary Society picked up on the misunderstanding for entertainment purposes.

== See also ==
- Cultural depictions of ravens
