= Raven Penny =

10th-century coin of Olaf Guthfrithson

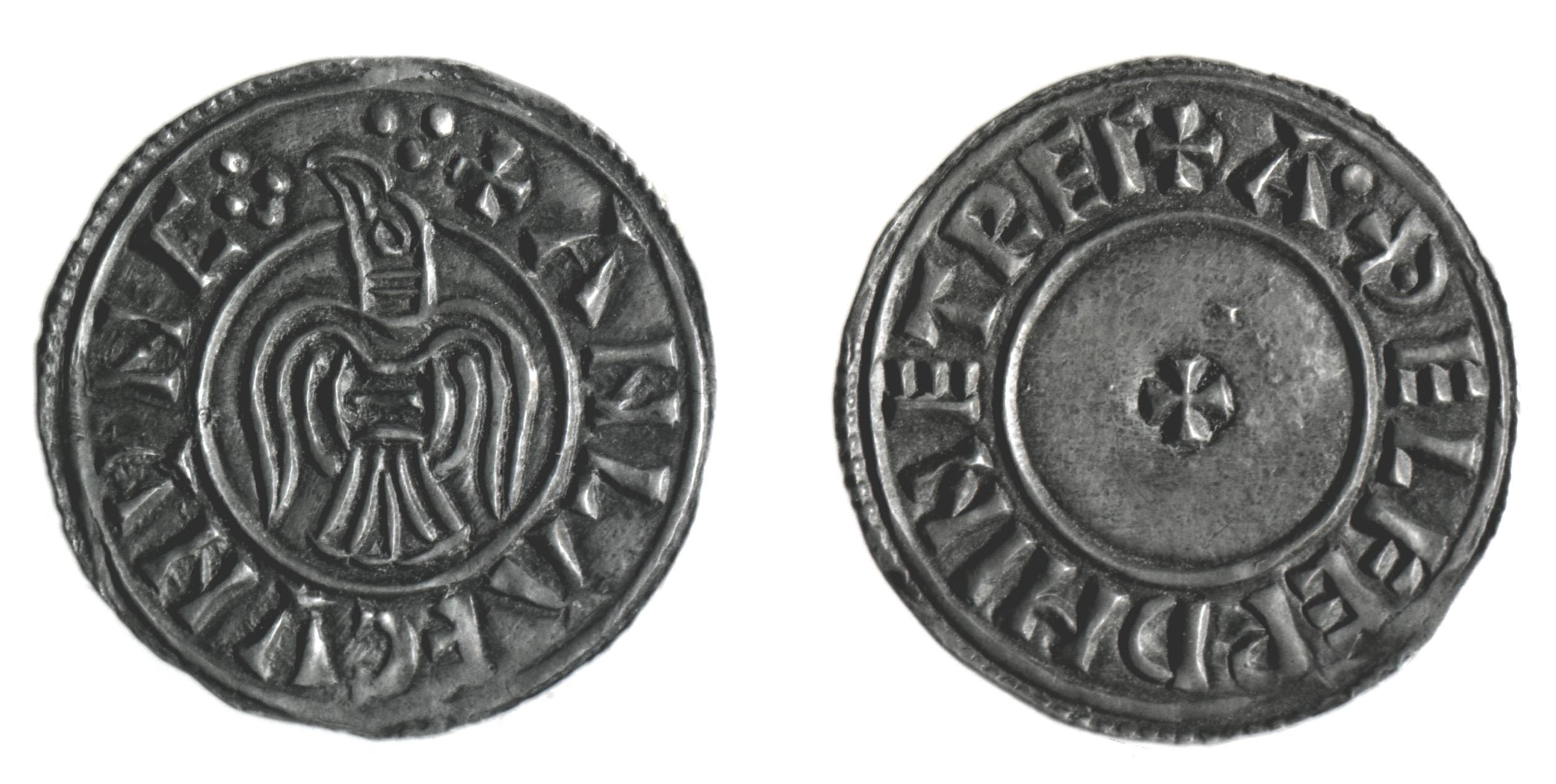
Raven Penny

The nicknamed "Raven Penny", is a coin of the Viking Olaf Guthfrithson, minted during his reign as the king of York between 939 and 941.

== History ==
Anlaf Guthfrithson was a member of the Norse-Gael Uí Ímair dynasty and King of Dublin from 934 to 941. He succeeded his father, Gofraid ua Ímair, who was also briefly king of York in 927 following the death of his kinsman Sitric Cáech, but was expelled in the same year by king Æthelstan of England.

During the short reign of Anlaf Guthfrithsson the Raven Penny was minted by Aethelferd between 939 and 941. The inscription on the Raven Penny mentions among other things “King Anlaf”.

== Legend and Images ==
Obverse

A raven with wings displayed and the encircled legend: +ANLAF CVNVNC. The legend means “King Anlaf”.

Reverse

A small cross pattée and the encircled legend: +EDELFERD MINETRE. The legend means “Moneyer Aethelferd”.

Interpretation

The legend CVNVNC on the obverse is the word Konungr in Old Norse written in the Latin alphabet minus the letter r. CVNVNC is most likely a transliteration from Younger Futhark into 10th century Latin:

ᚴᚢᚾᚢᚾᚴ

CVNVNC

This inscription is the earliest known surviving texts in Old Norse in the Latin alphabet. The use of Old Norse language instead of Latin coupled with the raven image, associated with the Norse god Odin, is a strong indication that the Vikings were declaring their independence in Ireland.

== See also ==
- Curmsun Disc
- Raven Banner Penny
- Cultural depictions of ravens
- Scandinavian York
- Runes
