= Cultural depictions of ravens =

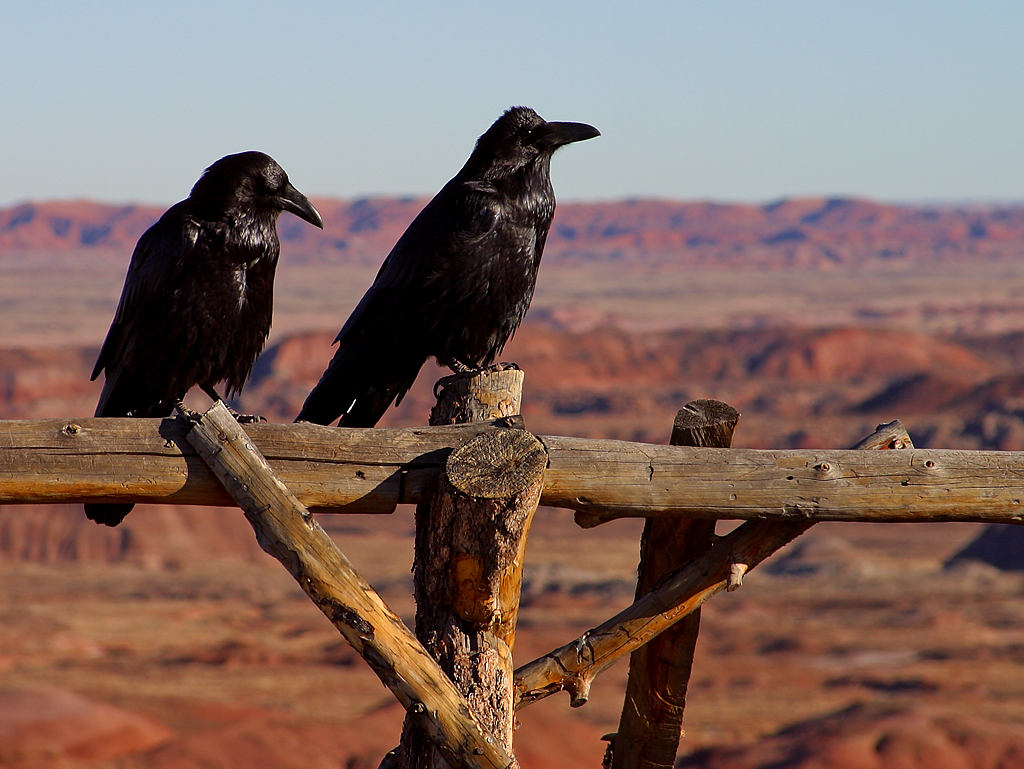
Common ravens in Petrified Forest National Park, Arizona.

Many references to ravens exist in world lore and literature. Most depictions allude to the appearance and behavior of the wide-ranging common raven (Corvus corax). Because of its black plumage, croaking call, and diet of carrion, the raven is often associated with loss and ill omen. Despite this, its symbolism is complex and alluring. As a talking bird, the raven also represents prophecy and insight, often acting as psychopomps in stories, connecting the spirit with the material world.

French anthropologist Claude Lévi-Strauss proposed a structuralist theory that suggests the raven (like the coyote) obtained mythic status because it was a mediator animal between life and death. As a carrion bird, ravens became associated with the dead and with lost souls. In Swedish folklore, they are the ghosts of murdered people without Christian burials and, in German stories, damned souls.

== Symbolism and mythology by culture ==
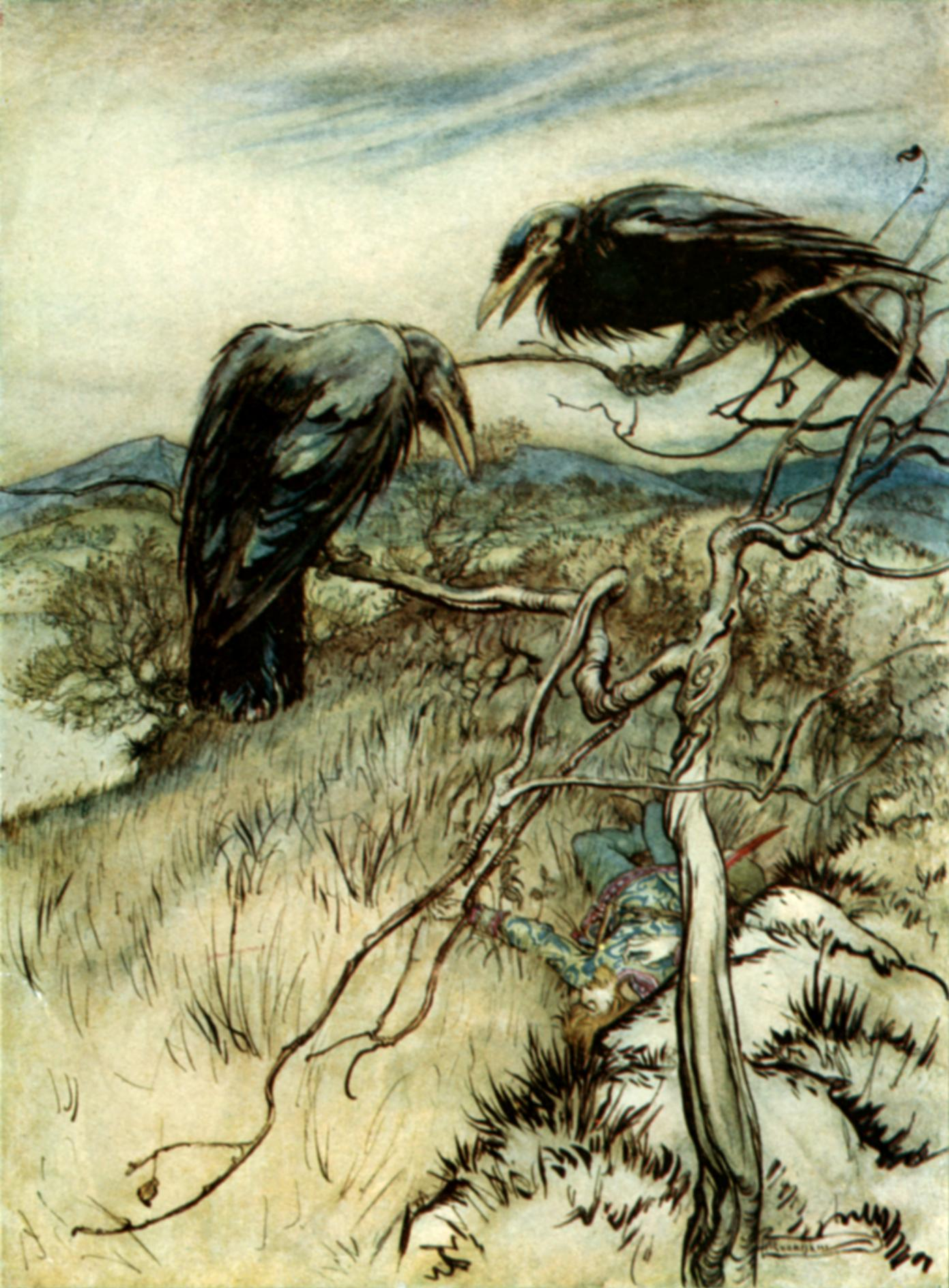
"The Twa Corbies", Illustration by Arthur Rackham to Some British Ballads

The Raven has appeared in the mythologies of many ancient peoples. Some of the more common stories are from those of Greek, Celtic, Norse, Pacific Northwest, and Roman mythology.

=== Greco-Roman antiquity ===
In Greek mythology, ravens are associated with Apollo, the God of prophecy. They are said to be a symbol of bad luck, and were the gods' messengers in the mortal world. According to the mythological narration, the god Apollo once tasked a white raven to spy on his pregnant lover, Coronis. When the raven brought back the news that Coronis had been unfaithful to him, Apollo scorched the raven in his fury, turning the bird's feathers black. In some versions, the raven had once been a man named Lycius who was transformed into a white raven by Apollo when savage donkeys attacked him and his family.

According to Livy, the Roman general Marcus Valerius Corvus (c. 370–270 BC) had a raven settle on his helmet during a combat with a gigantic Gaul, which distracted the enemy's attention by flying in his face. (Note: The general, previously known by his surname (cognomen) Calenus, was thus given the agnomen Corvus, (Latin for "raven"; cf: genus Corvus))

=== Hebrew Bible and Judaism ===
The raven (Hebrew: עורב; Koine Greek: κόραξ) is the first species of bird to be mentioned in the Hebrew Bible, and ravens are mentioned on numerous occasions thereafter:

- In the Book of Genesis, Noah releases a raven from the ark after the great flood to test whether the waters have receded (Genesis 8:6–7). In the following verses he also sends out a dove (Genesis 8:8-11).
- According to the Law of Moses, ravens are forbidden for food (Leviticus 11:15; Deuteronomy 14:14), a ruling which may have colored the perception of ravens in later sources.
- In the Book of Judges, one of the Kings of the Midianites defeated by Gideon is called "Orev" (עורב), which means "Raven".
- In the Book of Kings 17:4–6, God commands the ravens to feed the prophet Elijah.
- The male lover in Song of Songs 5:11 is described as having hair as black as a raven.
- Ravens are an example of God's gracious provision for all His creatures in Psalm 147:9 and Job 38:41.

Philo of Alexandria (first century AD), who interpreted the Bible allegorically, stated that Noah's raven was a symbol of vice, whereas the dove was a symbol of virtue.

In the Talmud, the raven is described as having been only one of three beings on Noah's Ark that copulated during the flood and so was punished. The Rabbis believed that the male raven was forced to spit. Pirke De-Rabbi Eliezer (chapter 25) explains that the reason why the raven Noah released from the ark did not return to him was that the raven was feeding on the corpses of those who had drowned in the flood. This tradition is also preserved in the Byzantine composition Palaea Historica.

According to the Icelandic Landnámabók – a story similar to Noah and the Ark – Hrafna-Flóki Vilgerðarson used ravens to guide his ship from the Faroe Islands to Iceland.

=== New Testament ===
In the New Testament, ravens, who "neither sow nor reap", are referred to by Jesus as an illustration of God's provision.

=== Late antiquity and Christian Middle Ages ===
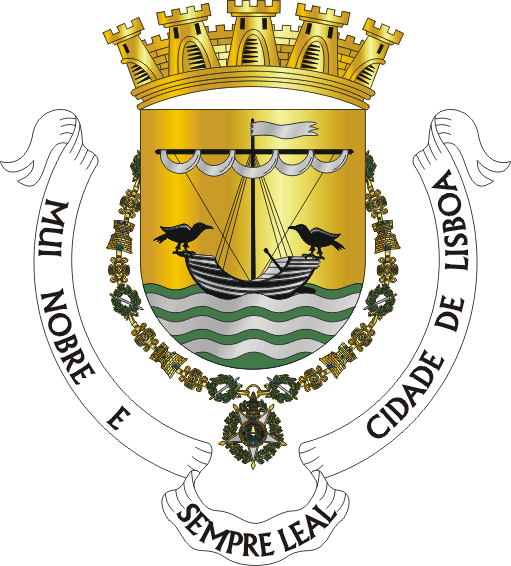
The ravens on the coat of arms of Lisbon recall the story of St. Vincent's ravens.

The name of the important Frankish King Guntram means "War Raven".

According to the legend of the fourth-century Iberian Christian martyr Saint Vincent of Saragossa, after St. Vincent was executed, ravens protected his body from being devoured by wild animals, until his followers could recover the body. His body was taken to what is now known as Cape St. Vincent in southern Portugal. A shrine was erected over his grave, which continued to be guarded by flocks of ravens. The Arab geographer Al-Idrisi noted this constant guard by ravens, for which the place was named by him كنيسة الغراب "Kanīsah al-Ghurāb" (Church of the Raven). King Afonso Henriques (1139–1185) had the body of the saint exhumed in 1173 and brought it by ship to Lisbon, still accompanied by the ravens. This transfer of the relics is depicted on the coat of arms of Lisbon.

A raven is also said to have protected Saint Benedict of Nursia by taking away a loaf of bread poisoned by jealous monks after he blessed it.

In the legends about the German Emperor Frederick Barbarossa, depicting him as sleeping along with his knights in a cave in the Kyffhäuser mountain in Thuringia or the Untersberg in Bavaria, it is told that when the ravens cease to fly around the mountain, he will awake and restore Germany to its ancient greatness. According to the story, the Emperor's eyes are half-closed in sleep, but now and then, he raises his hand and sends a boy out to see if the ravens have stopped flying.

=== Middle East / Islamic culture ===
In the Qur'an's version of the story of Cain and Abel, a raven is mentioned as the creature who taught Cain how to bury his murdered brother, in Al-Ma'ida (The Repast) 5:31. {Surah 5:27–31}

The story, as presented in the Quran and further postulated in the hadith, states that Cain, having murdered Abel, was bereft of a means of disposing of his brother's body. While scanning the surroundings for a solution, Cain noticed two ravens, one dead and the other alive. The still-living raven began digging the ground with its beak until a hole had been dug up, in which it buried its dead mate. Witnessing this, Cain discovered his solution, as indirectly revealed by God.

=== Germanic cultures and Viking Age ===
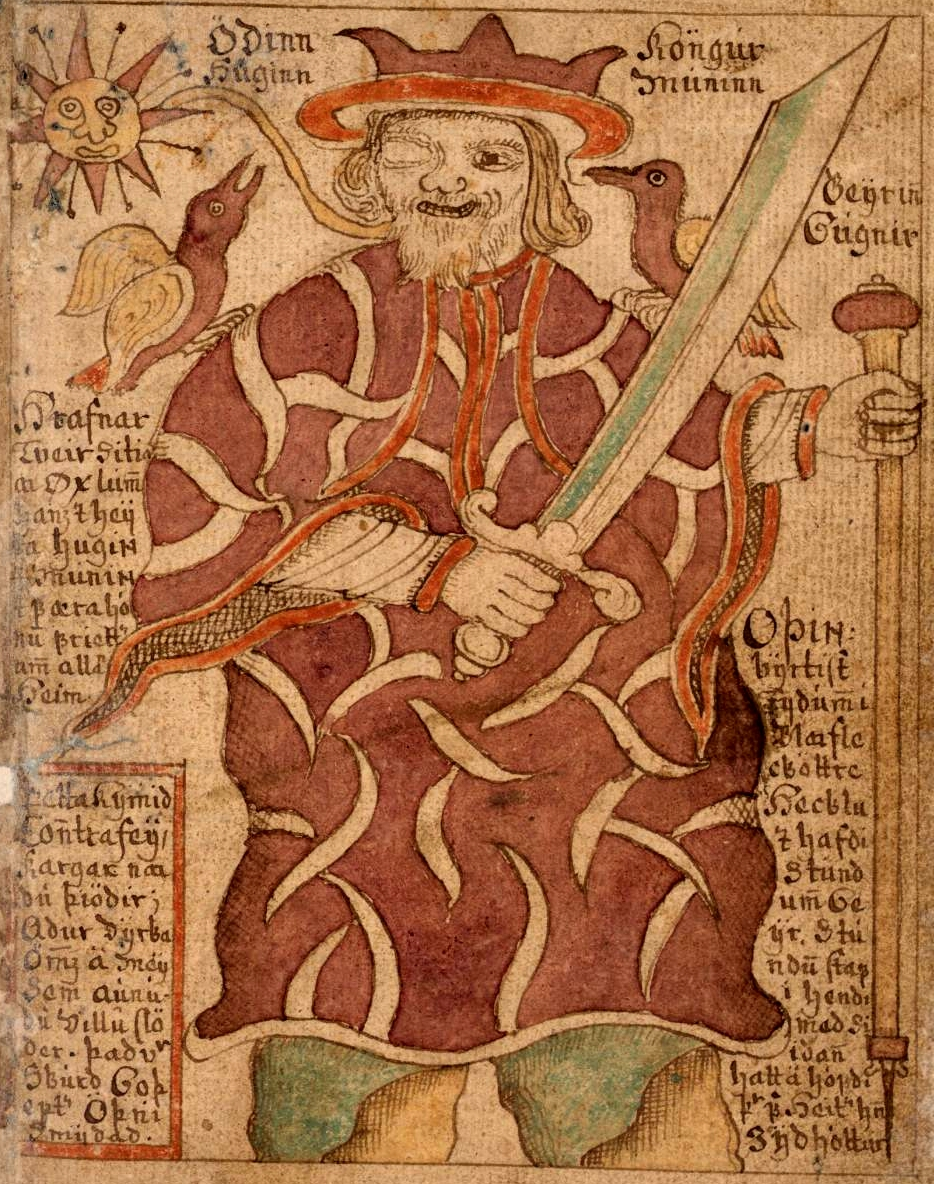
An illustration from an 18th-century Icelandic manuscript depicting Huginn and Muninn sitting on the shoulders of Odin.

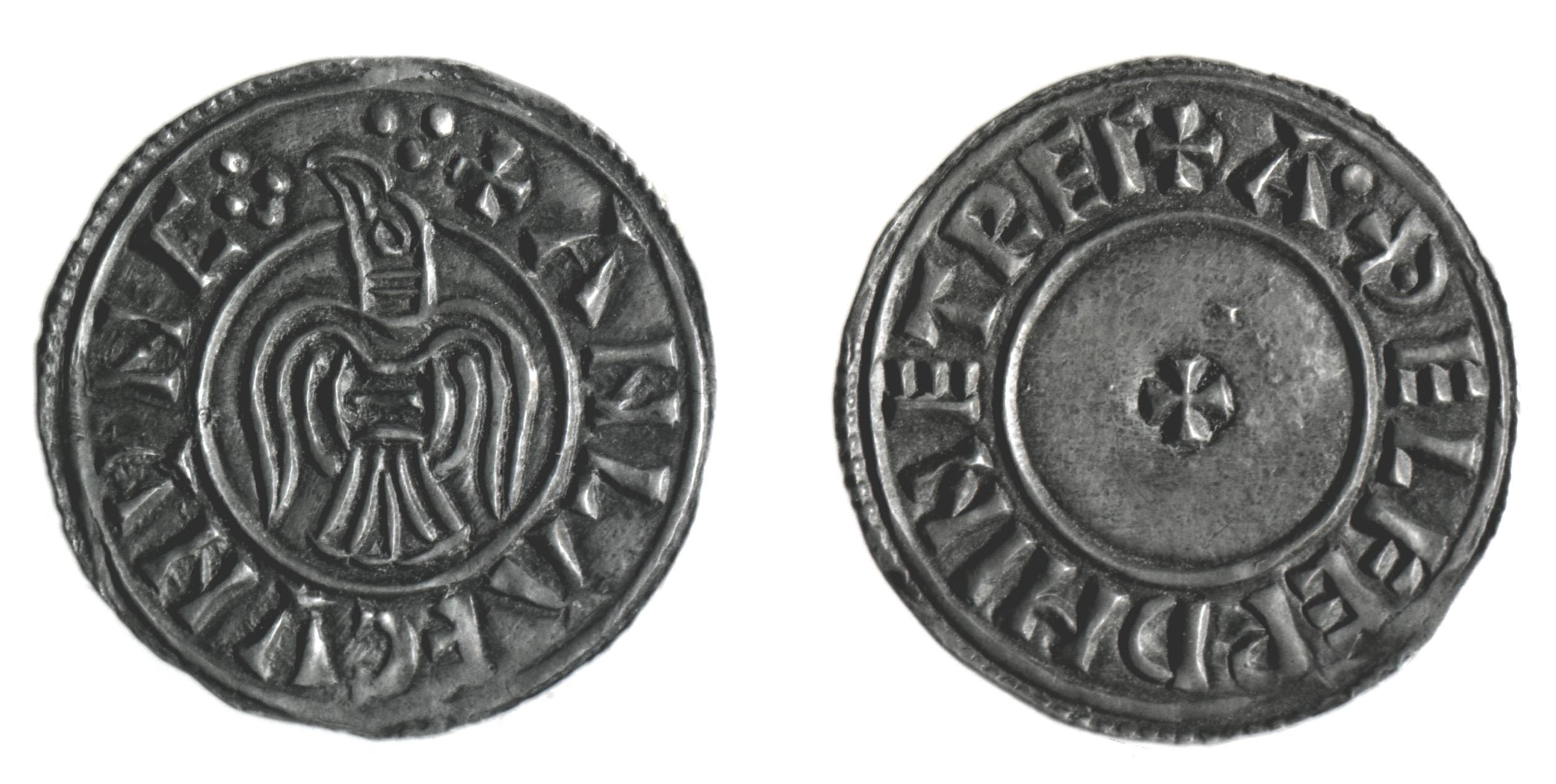
Raven Penny from York, minted by Olaf Guthfrithson, a Viking king

To the Germanic peoples, Odin was often associated with ravens. Examples include depictions of figures often identified as Odin appear flanked with two birds on a 6th-century bracteate and on a 7th-century helmet plate from Vendel, Sweden. In later Norse mythology, Odin is depicted as having two ravens Huginn and Muninn, serving as his eyes and ears – huginn meaning "thought" and muninn meaning "memory". Each day the ravens fly out from Hliðskjálf and bring Odin news from Midgard.

The Old English word for a raven was hræfn; in Old Norse it was hrafn; the word was frequently used in combinations as a kenning for bloodshed and battle. "Hrafn" was also used as a given name, or an element of a name like "Hrafnkell".

The raven was a common device used by the Vikings. Ragnar Lothbrok had a raven banner called Reafan, embroidered with the device of a raven. It was said that if this banner fluttered, Lothbrok would carry the day, but if it hung lifeless, the battle would be lost. King Harald Hardrada also had a raven banner, called Landeythan (land-waster). The bird also appears in the folklore of the Isle of Man, a former Viking colony, and it is used as a symbol on their coat of arms.

=== Medieval Britain and Ireland ===
==== Welsh mythology ====
The Attributed arms devised for Urien of the House of Rheged, based on their association with the raven

Ravens are prominent in early Welsh mythology, with the Medieval Welsh poem Y Gododdin repeatedly associating ravens with battles, bravery and death. The poem refers to the battlefield as the "ravens' feast", with descriptions of the ravens eating the dead bodies of the fallen warriors. In praising the bravery of a warrior named Gwawrddur, the poem's author references his affinity with ravens:

He fed black ravens on the rampart of a fortress
Though he was no Arthur
Among the powerful ones in battle
In the front rank, Gwawrddur was a palisade.

In the Middle Welsh text The Dream of Rhonabwy, King Arthur prepares for the Battle of Mount Badon with his knight Owain of Rheged, Owain is accompanied by a host of ravens and protests three times to the king that they are being attacked by the king's servants.

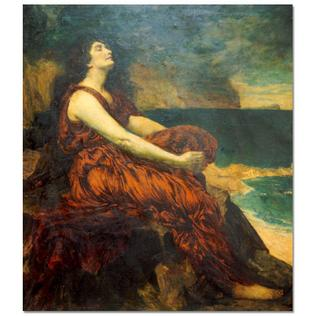
Branwen, the Welsh goddess associated with birds whose name translates as "The blessed or beautiful raven"

Ravens are prominent throughout medieval Welsh texts and several characters in Welsh mythology have names associated with corvids and ravens. Brân the Blessed and his sister, Branwen are two of the best known characters from the Mabinogion, both names derive from the Welsh word for raven. According to the Trioedd Ynys Prydein, following Brân's death he commands his men to cut off his head and carry it to "the White Mount, in London, and bury it there". This White mount is often associated with Tower Hill and the fortress that is now the Tower of London's White Tower.

==== Tower of London ====
The Celtic legends around Brân and the tower may be the origin of the still-current practice of keeping ravens at the Tower of London. According to English legend, the Kingdom of England will fall if the ravens of the Tower of London are removed. It had been thought that there had been at least six ravens in residence at the tower for centuries. It was said that Charles II ordered their removal following complaints from John Flamsteed, the Royal Astronomer. However, they were not removed because Charles was then told of the legend. Charles, following the time of the English Civil War, superstition or not, was not prepared to take the chance, and instead had the observatory moved to Greenwich.

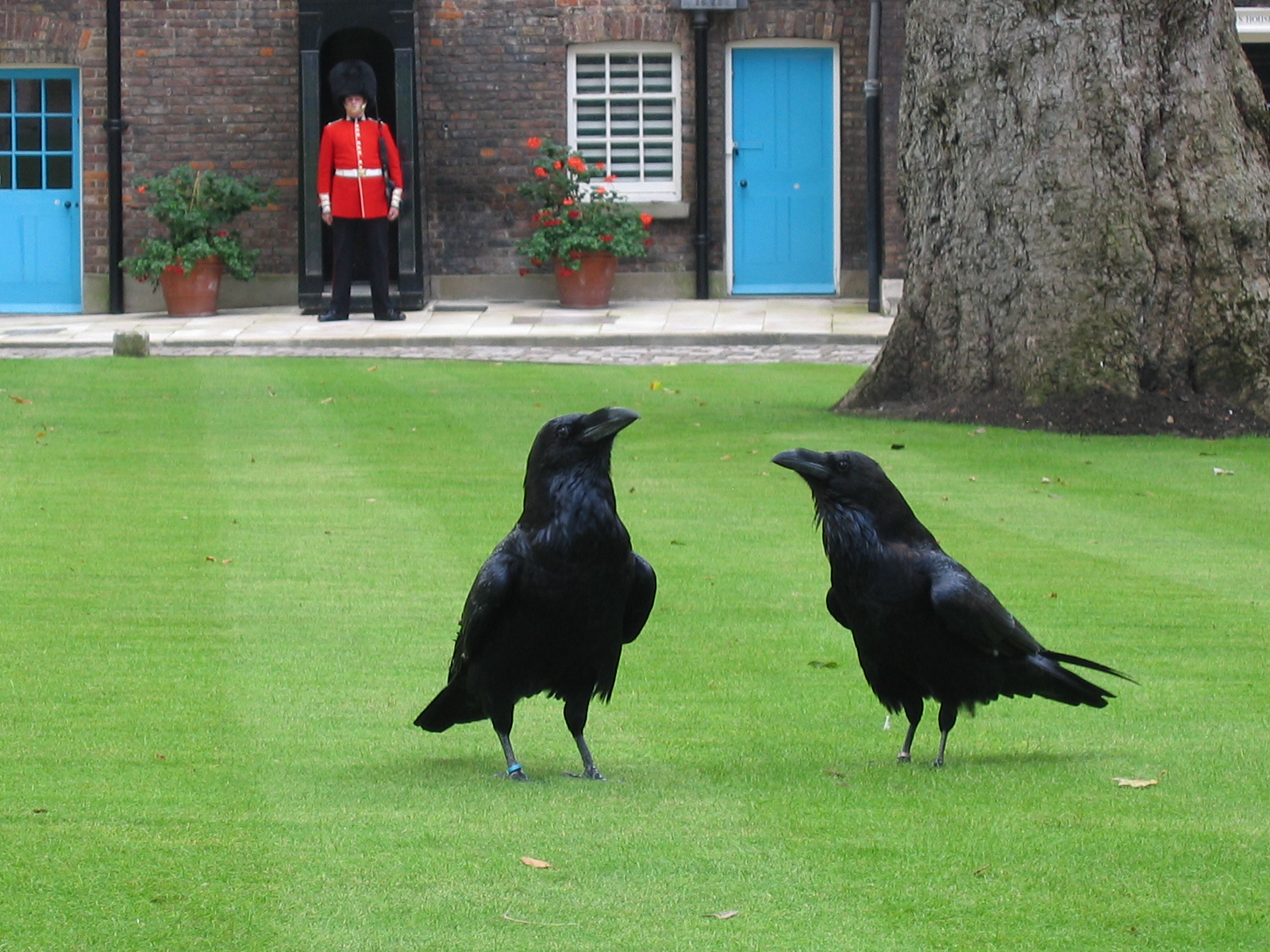
Ravens in the Tower of London

The earliest known reference to a Tower raven is a picture in the newspaper The Pictorial World in 1883, as well as a poem and illustration published the same year in the children's book London Town. This and scattered subsequent references, both literary and visual, which appear in the late nineteenth to the early twentieth century, place them near the monument commemorating those beheaded at the tower, popularly known as the "scaffold." This strongly suggests that the ravens, which are notorious for gathering at gallows, were originally used to dramatize tales of imprisonment and execution at the tower told to tourists by the Yeomen Warders. There is evidence that the original ravens were donated to the tower by the Earls of Dunraven, perhaps because of their association with the Celtic raven-god Bran. However, wild ravens, which were once abundant in London and often seen around meat markets (such as nearby Eastcheap) foraging for scraps, could have roosted at the Tower in earlier times.

During the Second World War, most of the Tower's ravens perished through shock during bombing raids, leaving only a mated pair named "Mabel" and "Grip." Shortly before the Tower reopened to the public, Mabel flew away, leaving Grip despondent. A couple of weeks later, Grip also flew away, probably in search of his mate. The incident was reported in several newspapers, and some of the stories contained the first references in print to the legend that the British Empire would fall if the ravens left the tower. Since the Empire was dismantled shortly afterward, those who are superstitious might interpret events as a confirmation of the legend. Before the tower reopened to the public on 1 January 1946, care was taken to ensure that a new set of ravens was in place.

==== In Ireland ====
In Irish mythology, ravens are associated with warfare and the battleground in the figures of Badb and Morrígan. The goddess Morrígan alighted on the hero Cú Chulainn's shoulder in the form of a raven after his death.

=== Hindu / South Asia ===
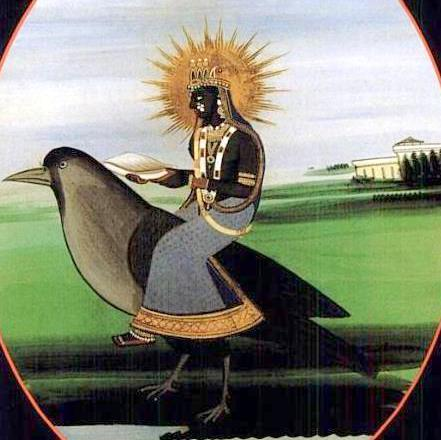
Goddess Dhumavati riding a crow.

In the Story of Bhusunda, a chapter of the Yoga Vasistha, a very old sage in the form of a crow, Bhusunda, recalls a succession of epochs in the earth's history, as described in Hindu cosmology. He survived several destructions, living on a wish-fulfilling tree on Mount Meru. Crows are also considered ancestors in Hinduism, and during Śrāddha the practice of offering food or pinda to crows is still in vogue.

The Hindu deity Shani (divine personification of Saturn) is often represented as being mounted on a giant black raven or crow. The crow (sometimes a raven or vulture) is Shani's Vahana. As a protector of property, Shani is able to repress the thieving tendencies of these birds. Dhumavati, the widow goddess associated with strife and inauspiciousness, is depicted riding a crow or in a horseless chariot bearing an emblem of a crow.

The raven is the national bird of Bhutan, and it adorns the royal hat, representing the deity Gonpo Jarodonchen (Mahakala) with Raven's head; one of the important guardian deities.

=== Zoroastrianism ===
In Persian sacred literature, a bird acted as the emissary for the diffusion of the Zoroastrian religion among the creatures living in Yima's enclosure (vara). The bird's name is given as Karšiptar or Karšift. According to scholarship, its name would mean "black-winged" (from Karši- "black", cognate to Sanskrit kṛṣṇá and Slavic chjerno; and ptar-, cognate to Greek pterón). The name possibly refers to a raven, since this bird plays the role of divine messenger in several mythologies.

=== North American Pacific Northwest ===
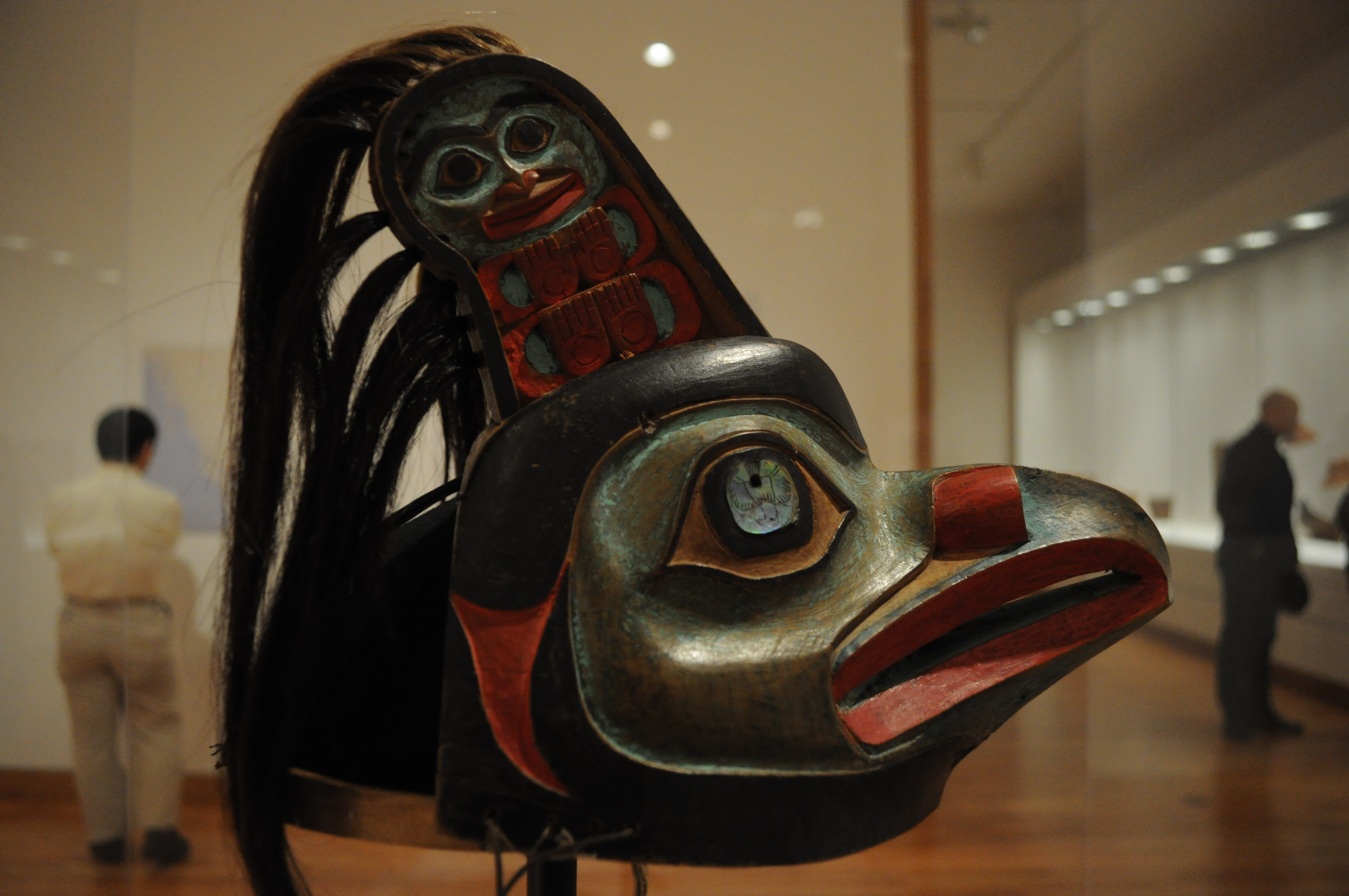
Raven at the Headwaters of Nass hat, Seattle Art Museum, attributed to Kadyisdu.axch', Tlingit, Kiks.ádi clan, active late 18th – early 19th century. There are human figures crouching within Raven's ears

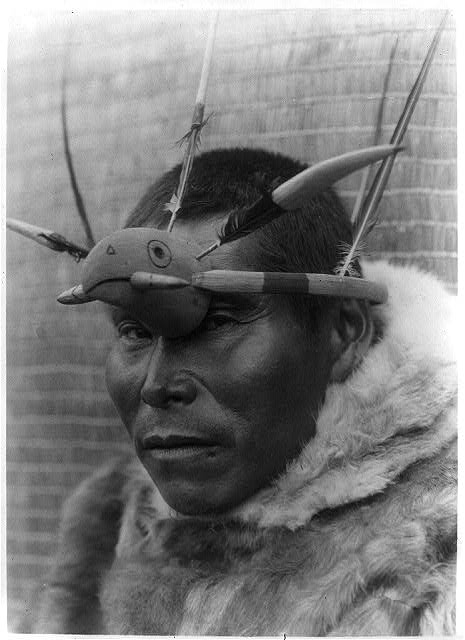
A Nunivak Cup'ig man with raven maskette. The raven (Nunivak Cup'ig language: tulukarug) is Ellam Cua or Creator god in the Cup’ig mythology

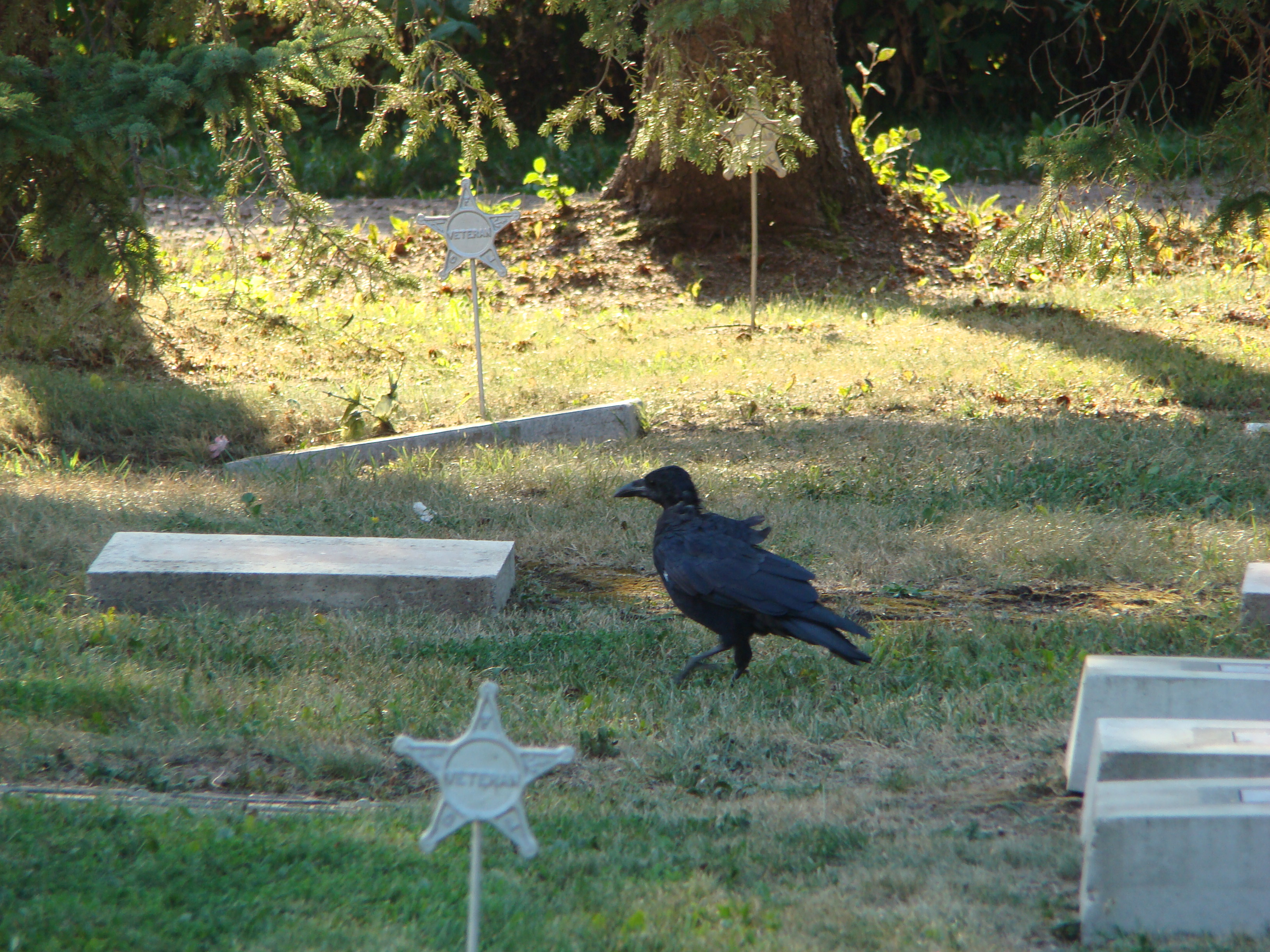
A raven in a cemetery. Because they are scavengers, ravens have been associated with death.

The raven also has a prominent role in the mythologies of the Indigenous peoples of the Pacific Northwest Coast, including the Tsimishians, Haidas, Heiltsuks, Tlingits, Kwakwaka'wakw, Coast Salish, Koyukons, and Inuit. The raven in these indigenous peoples' mythology is the Creator of the world, but it is also considered a trickster God.

For example, in Tlingit culture, there are two different Raven characters that can be identified, although they are not always clearly differentiated. One is the Creator Raven, responsible for bringing the world into being, who is sometimes considered to be the individual who brought light to the darkness. The other is the childish Raven, always selfish, sly, conniving, and hungry.

When the Great Spirit created all things, he kept them separate and stored them in cedar boxes. The Great Spirit gifted these boxes to the animals who existed before humans. When the animals opened the boxes all the things that comprise the world came into being. The boxes held such things as mountains, fire, water, wind, and seeds for all the plants. One such box, which was given to Seagull, contained all the light of the world. Seagull coveted his box and refused to open it, clutching it under his wing. All the people asked Raven to persuade Seagull to open it and release the light. Despite begging, demanding, flattering, and trying to trick him into opening the box, Seagull still refused. Finally, Raven became angry and frustrated, and stuck a thorn in Seagull's foot. Raven pushed the thorn in deeper until the pain caused Seagull to drop the box. Then out of the box came the sun, moon, and stars that brought light to the world and allowed the first day to begin.

Bill Reid created the sculpture of The Raven and the First Men depicting a scene from a Haida myth that unifies the Raven as both the trickster and the creator. According to this myth, the raven, who was both bored and well-fed, found and freed some creatures trapped in a clam. These scared and timid beings were the first men of the world, and they were coaxed out of the clamshell by the raven. Soon the raven was bored with these creatures and planned to return them to their shell. Instead, the raven decided to search for the female counterparts of these male beings. The raven found some female humans trapped in a chiton, freed them, and was entertained as the two sexes met and began to interact. The raven, always known as a trickster, was responsible for the pairing of humans and felt very protective of them. With the Raven perceived as the creator, many Haida myths and legends often suggest the raven as a provider to mankind.

Another raven story from the Puget Sound region describes the "Raven" as having originally lived in the land of spirits (literally bird land) that existed before the world of humans. One day the Raven became so bored with bird land that he flew away, carrying a stone in his beak. When the Raven became tired of carrying the stone and dropped it, the stone fell into the ocean and expanded until it formed the firmament on which humans now live.

One ancient story told on Haida Gwaii tells about how Raven helped to bring the Sun, Moon, Stars, Fresh Water, and Fire to the world:

Long ago, near the beginning of the world, Gray Eagle was the guardian of the Sun, Moon and Stars, of fresh water, and of fire. Gray Eagle hated people so much that he kept these things hidden. People lived in darkness, without fire and without fresh water.

Gray Eagle had a beautiful daughter, and Raven fell in love with her. In the beginning, Raven was a snow-white bird, and as a such, he pleased Gray Eagle's daughter. She invited him to her father's longhouse.

When Raven saw the Sun, Moon and stars, and fresh water hanging on the sides of Eagle's lodge, he knew what he should do. He watched for his chance to seize them when no one was looking. He stole all of them, and a brand of fire also, and flew out of the longhouse through the smoke hole. As soon as Raven got outside he hung the Sun up in the sky. It made so much light that he was able to fly far out to an island in the middle of the ocean. When the Sun set, he fastened the Moon up in the sky and hung the stars around in different places. By this new light he kept on flying, carrying with him the fresh water and the brand of fire he had stolen.

He flew back over the land. When he had reached the right place, he dropped all the water he had stolen. It fell to the ground and there became the source of all the fresh-water streams and lakes in the world. Then Raven flew on, holding the brand of fire in his bill. The smoke from the fire blew back over his white feathers and made them black. When his bill began to burn, he had to drop the firebrand. It struck rocks and hid itself within them. That is why, if you strike two stones together, sparks of fire will drop out.

Raven's feathers never became white again after they were blackened by the smoke from the firebrand. That is why Raven is now a black bird.

Other notable stories tell of the Raven stealing and releasing the sun, and of the Raven tempting the first humans out of a clamshell. Another story of the Kwakiutl or Kwakwaka'wakw of British Columbia who exposed boys' placentas to ravens to encourage future prophetic visions, thereby associating the raven with prophecy, similar to the traditions of Scandinavia.

In one legend, Raven transformed himself into a pine needle which is swallowed by the unmarried daughter of the owner of the box of daylight, who then becomes pregnant and gives birth to Raven in disguise.

=== Siberia, Northern Asia ===
The raven god or spirit Kutcha (or Kutkh, (Кутх)) is important in the shamanic tradition of the Koryaks and other indigenous Chukotko-Kamchatkan peoples of the Russian Far East.

Kutcha is traditionally revered in various forms by various peoples and appears in many legends: as a key figure in creation, as a fertile ancestor of mankind, as a mighty shaman, and as a trickster. He is a popular subject of the animist stories of the Chukchi people and plays a central role in the mythology of the Koryaks and Itelmens of Kamchatka. Many of the stories regarding Kutkh are similar to those of the Raven among the indigenous peoples of the Pacific Northwest Coast, indicating a long history of indirect cultural contact between Asian and North American peoples.

Two ravens or crows, flying over the warrior's head in battle, symbolized in Yakut mythology the Ilbis Kyyha and Ohol Uola, two evil spirits of war and violence. Some other gods or spirits in yakut shamanism, including Uluu Suorun Toyon and Uluutuar Uluu Toyon, are described as "great raven of cloudy sky".

== In modern martial culture ==
In many countries, the raven is the unofficial animal associated with electronic warfare. This includes the militaries of the United States, Canada, United Arab Emirates, and Israel. This is due to the codename "Ravens" or "Crows" given to Allied Forces operating early radar systems and electronic countermeasures during World War II.

== Emblems: heraldry and mascotry ==
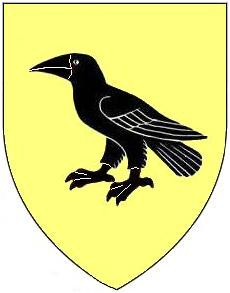
Arms of Corbet baronets of Moreton Corbet, cr. 1808: Or, a raven sable

A crown-headed raven in the coat of arms of the former Korpo municipality

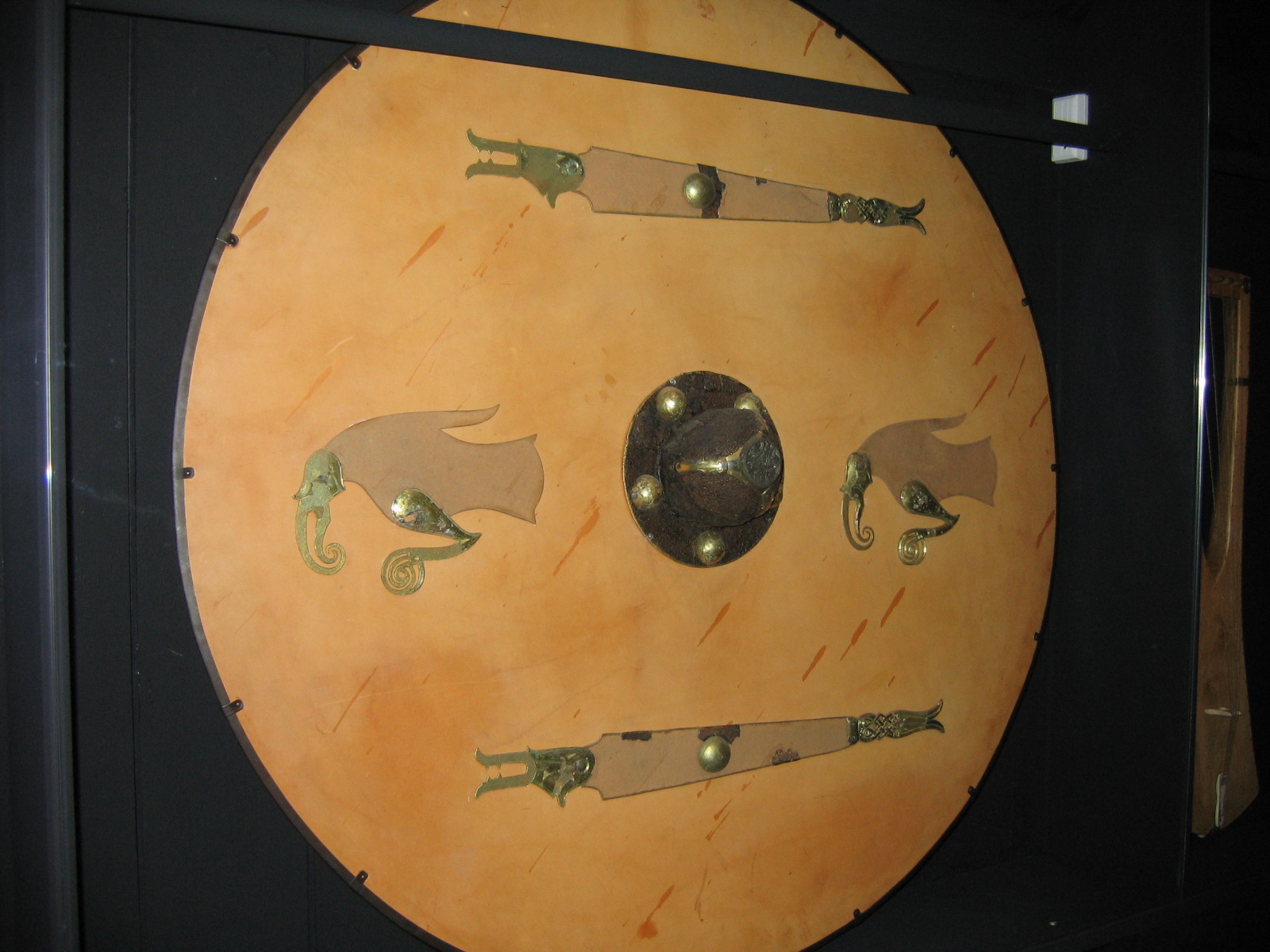
A Swedish shield from Vendel with Raven stylings

Ravens are common charges in world heraldry. Within British heraldry, the raven is believed to derive from Norman symbolism. The Corbet family, which can trace unbroken male descent to the Norman conquest of England, traditionally uses a raven sable upon a field or as its symbol, only varying it by adding bordures or additional birds. Other corvids, such as the crow and the rook, are not typically distinguished from ravens.

A raven is present on the crest of the coat of arms of the Washington family. Consequently, the same image appears on the unit insignia of the Washington State Area Command, Washington Army National Guard.

The coat of arms of Lisbon recalls the story of St. Vincent's ravens.

The common raven is the official bird of the Yukon and of the city of Yellowknife, Northwest Territories.

The common raven serves as a city symbol in Baltimore owing to the downtown location of Edgar Allan Poe's gravesite. Poe's most famous poem inspired the name and colours of the Baltimore Ravens, a National Football League team.

The Norwegian Nasjonal Samling party of 1933–1945 relied heavily on Nordic and Viking symbolism and used a crest of a raven clutching a sun cross on documents and uniform insignias, particularly under the Quisling regime.

Raven clutching a sun cross, as used by the Nasjonal Samling party of Norway

During the American involvement in the Laotian Civil War, "Raven" was adopted as the callsign for the 130 covert US Air Force Forward Air Controllers who directed US air strikes on targets across Laos from unmarked Cessna 0-1 Bird Dog spotter planes. The association for Raven veterans is called the Edgar Allan Poe Literary Society.

== Names ==
- The first name "Bram" is derived from a convergence of two separate etymological sources, one being an abbreviation of "Abraham", but the other being the Gaelic word "bran", meaning "raven". The name Bran, signifying a raven, was used in medieval Ireland.
- One derivation of the Irish given name "Brennan" comes from the Gaelic "Branán", meaning "little raven".
- The Germanic first names "Bertram" and "Wolfram" both derive from the Old High German word "hram", meaning raven.
- The name "Raven" exists both as a first and a surname in the English language. The first name is unisex but much more common among women, especially African-American ones. Examples include Raven-Symoné, Raven Goodwin or Raven Baxter.

== Popular culture and the arts ==
- Horror films such as Alfred Hitchcock's 1963 The Birds and Don Taylor's 1978 Damien: Omen II feature ravens committing stylish, often gruesome murders.
- Ravens are used in the fantasy novel series A Song of Ice and Fire to carry messages. There is also a character called the "Three-eyed Raven".
- The Metal Gear video game series features two raven-themed characters; Vulcan Raven and Raging Raven.
- Mech pilots in the Armored Core video game series are often referred to as "ravens".
- The superhero Raven, from DC Comics titles such as Teen Titans, has magic tied to her demon father that allows her to astral project her soul, which is raven-shaped.
- Gothic poems such as The Raven by Edgar Allan Poe.
- The title character of the children's game show Raven is an immortal warlord named for his ability to shapeshift from raven to human.
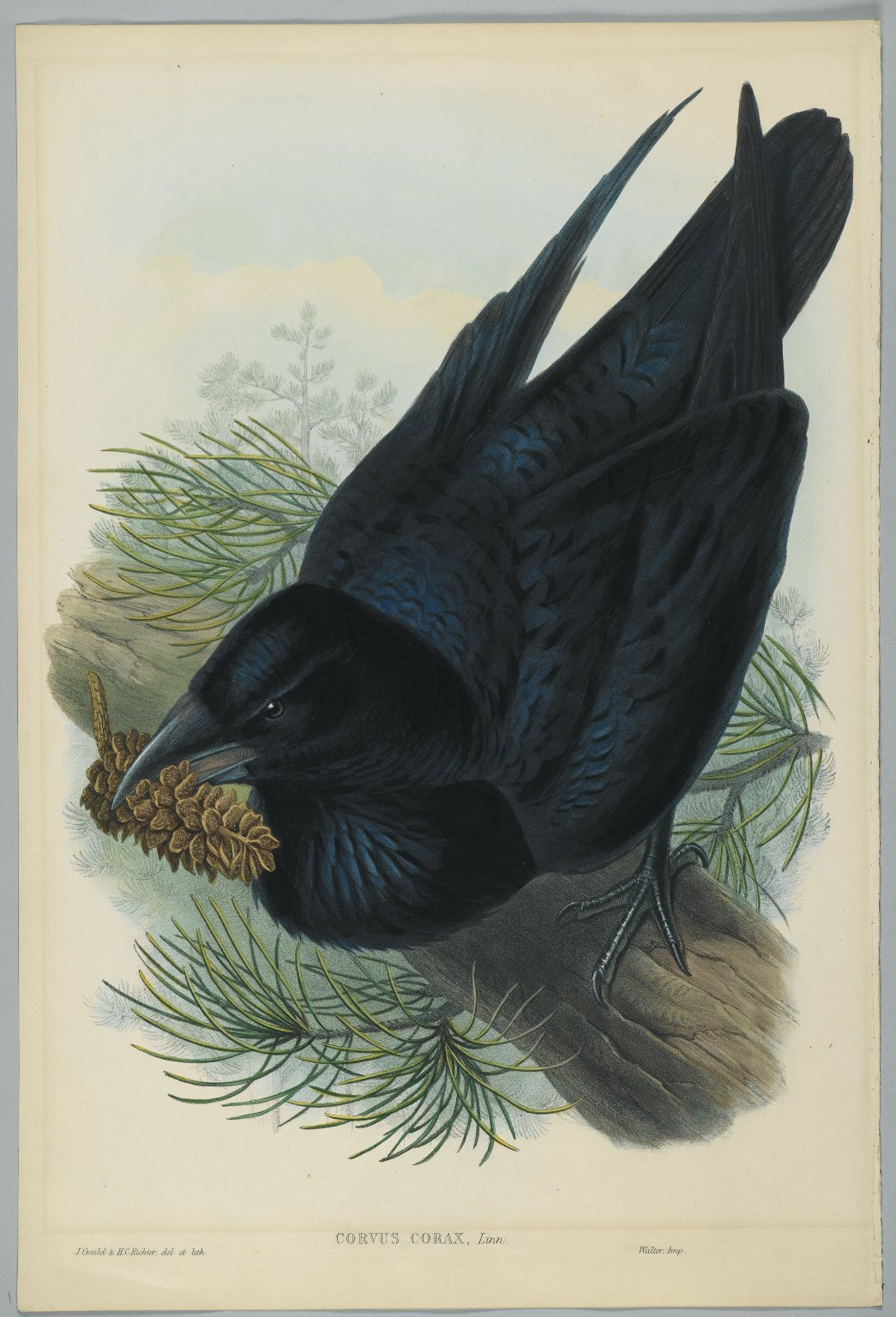
John Gould, Corvus Corax, c.1860s.

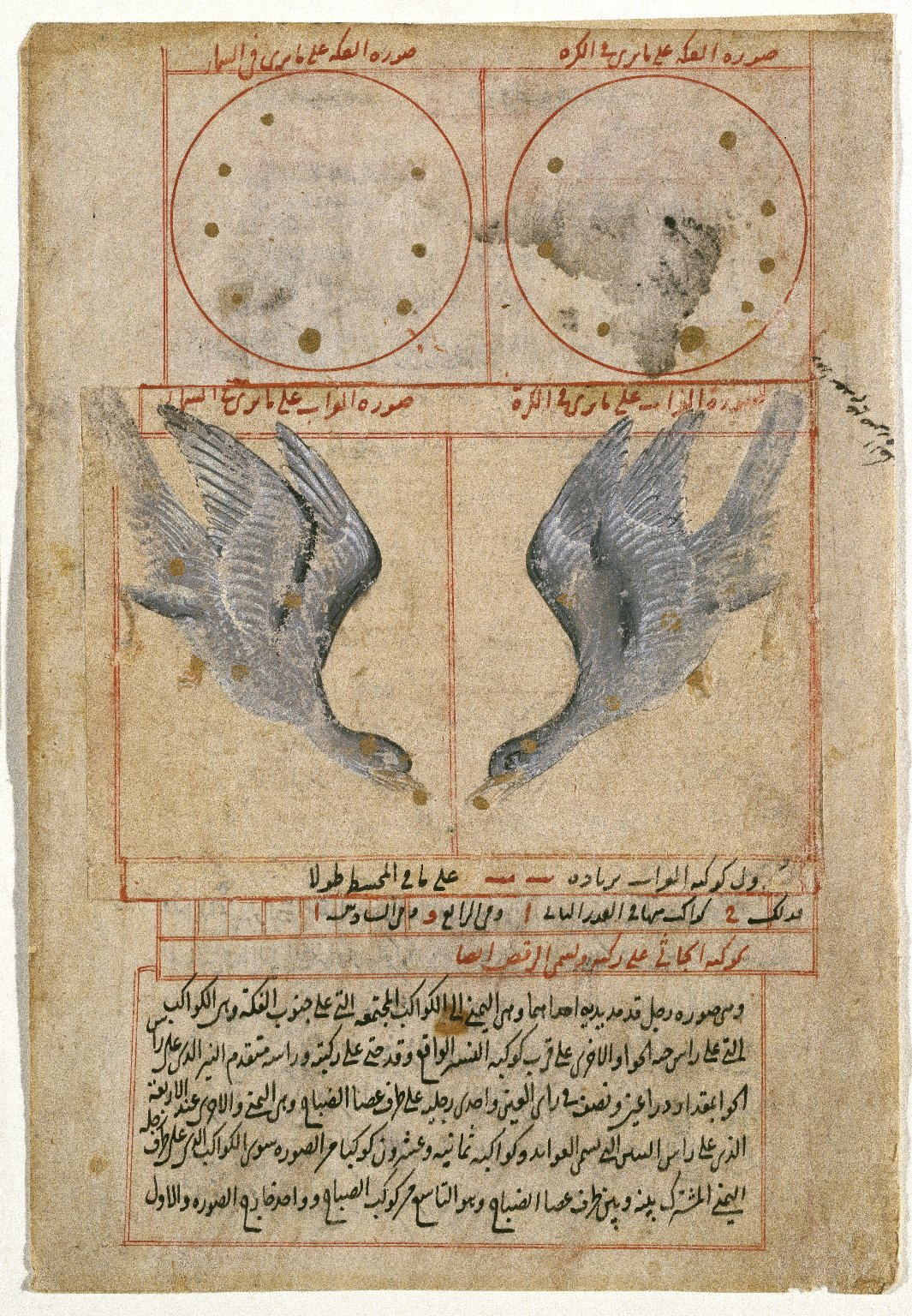
The Constellation of Corvus the Raven Brooklyn Museum

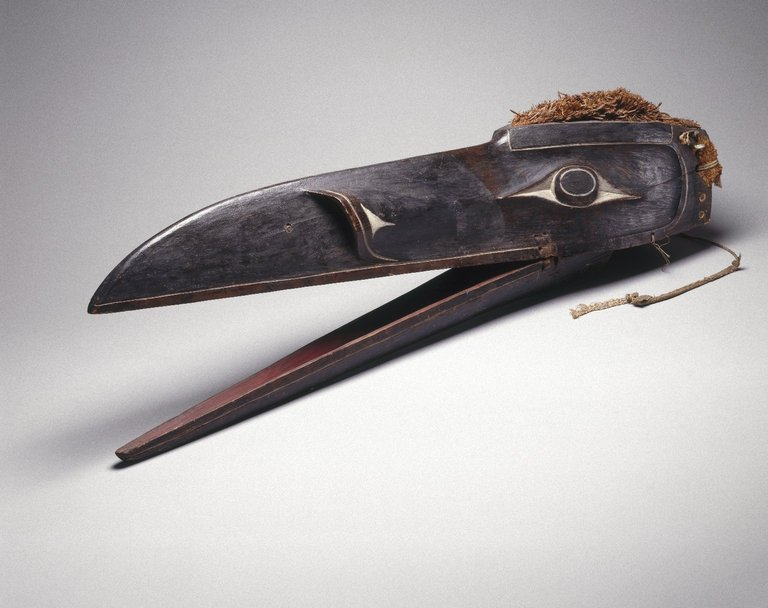
Kwakwakaʼwakw raven mask Brooklyn Museum

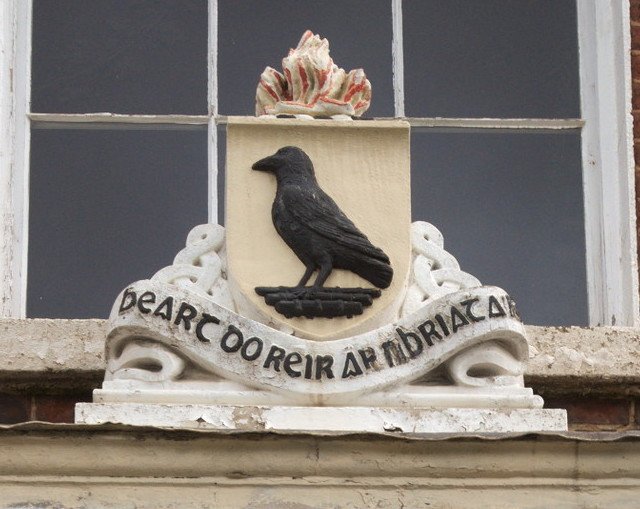
Raven on the coat of arms of County Dublin, Ireland.

Ravens on the coat of arms of the Hunyadi family, including 15th-century Hungarian king Matthias Corvinus.

A raven on the coat-of-arms of the Polish aristocratic Clan Ślepowron, to which Kazimierz Pułaski belonged

== See also ==
- Baltimore Ravens – a professional American football team
- Club Atlético San Lorenzo de Almagro – an Argentine association football club popularly known as "Cuervo" ("crow" in Spanish)
- Coyote (mythology)
- Crows in culture and folklore
- Cultural depictions of penguins
- Deloy Ges – an Alaskan village that was founded by raven Yixgitsiy in Athabaskan mythology
- Grip (raven) – a raven kept as a pet by writer Charles Dickens
- Kutkh
- Nanabozho – a character in Ojibwe mythology
- Raven in Keys to the Kingdom
- Raven Tales
- The Raven
