= Volcanic rock =

Rock formed from lava erupted from a volcano

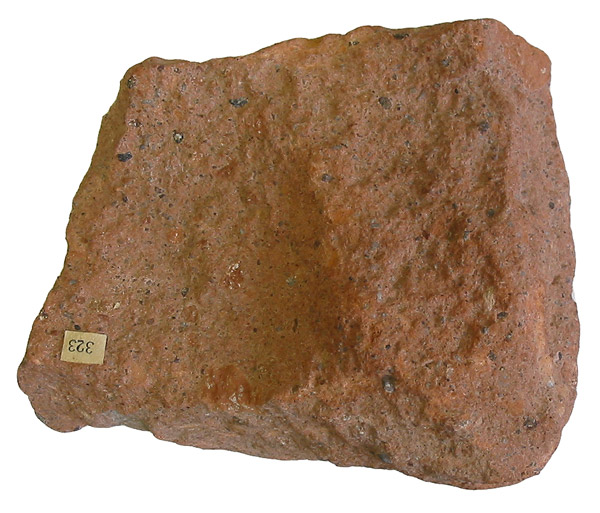
Ignimbrite, a volcanic rock deposited by pyroclastic flows

Volcanic rocks (often shortened to volcanics in scientific contexts) are rocks formed from lava erupted from a volcano. Like all rock types, the concept of volcanic rock is artificial, and in nature volcanic rocks grade into hypabyssal and metamorphic rocks and constitute an important element of some sediments and sedimentary rocks. For these reasons, in geology, volcanics and shallow hypabyssal rocks are not always treated as distinct. In the context of Precambrian shield geology, the term "volcanic" is often applied to what are strictly metavolcanic rocks. Volcanic rocks and sediment that form from magma erupted into the air are called "pyroclastics," and these are also technically sedimentary rocks.

Volcanic rocks are among the most common rock types on Earth's surface, particularly in the oceans. On land, they are very common at plate boundaries and in flood basalt provinces. It has been estimated that volcanic rocks cover about 8% of the Earth's current land surface.

== Characteristics ==
=== Setting and size ===
Volcanic rocks are classified based on their formation environment and particle size. They can originate from lava flows or be ejected explosively as fragmented material known as tephra.

- Lava – When molten rock erupts and solidifies on the Earth's surface, it forms coherent volcanic rocks such as basalt, andesite, and rhyolite. The size and structure of lava formations vary, with common types including pahoehoe (smooth, ropy lava) and ʻaʻā (rough, jagged lava).
- Tephra – Fragmented volcanic material ejected during eruptions, which varies in size and composition. Tephra includes:
  - Volcanic bomb – Large, semi-molten fragments ejected from a volcano that solidify before reaching the ground. They often acquire aerodynamic shapes due to their flight through the air.
  - Lapilli – Rock fragments between 2 and 64 mm in diameter, formed from lava droplets or broken volcanic material. Lapilli can accumulate to form volcanic breccia or tuff.
  - Volcanic ash – Fine particles (<2 mm) of pulverized rock, minerals, and glass created during explosive eruptions. Ash can travel long distances, affecting air quality and climate.

The size and setting of volcanic rock influence its distribution, physical properties, and impact on the environment.

Classification of Volcaniclastic rocks and sediments
		Pyroclastic deposit	
Clast size in mm	Pyroclast	Primarily unconsolidated: tephra	Primarily consolidated: pyroclastic rock
> 64 mm	Bomb, block	Agglomerate, bed of blocks or bomb, block tephra	Agglomerate, pyroclastic breccia
64 to 2 mm	Lapillus	Layer, bed of lapilli or lapilli tephra	Lapilli tuff
2 to 1/16 mm	Coarse ash grain	Coarse ash	Coarse (ash tuff)
< 1/16 mm	Fine ash grain (dust grain)	Fine ash (dust)	Fine (ash) tuff (dust tuff) Type 3-Class Rogue

=== Texture ===
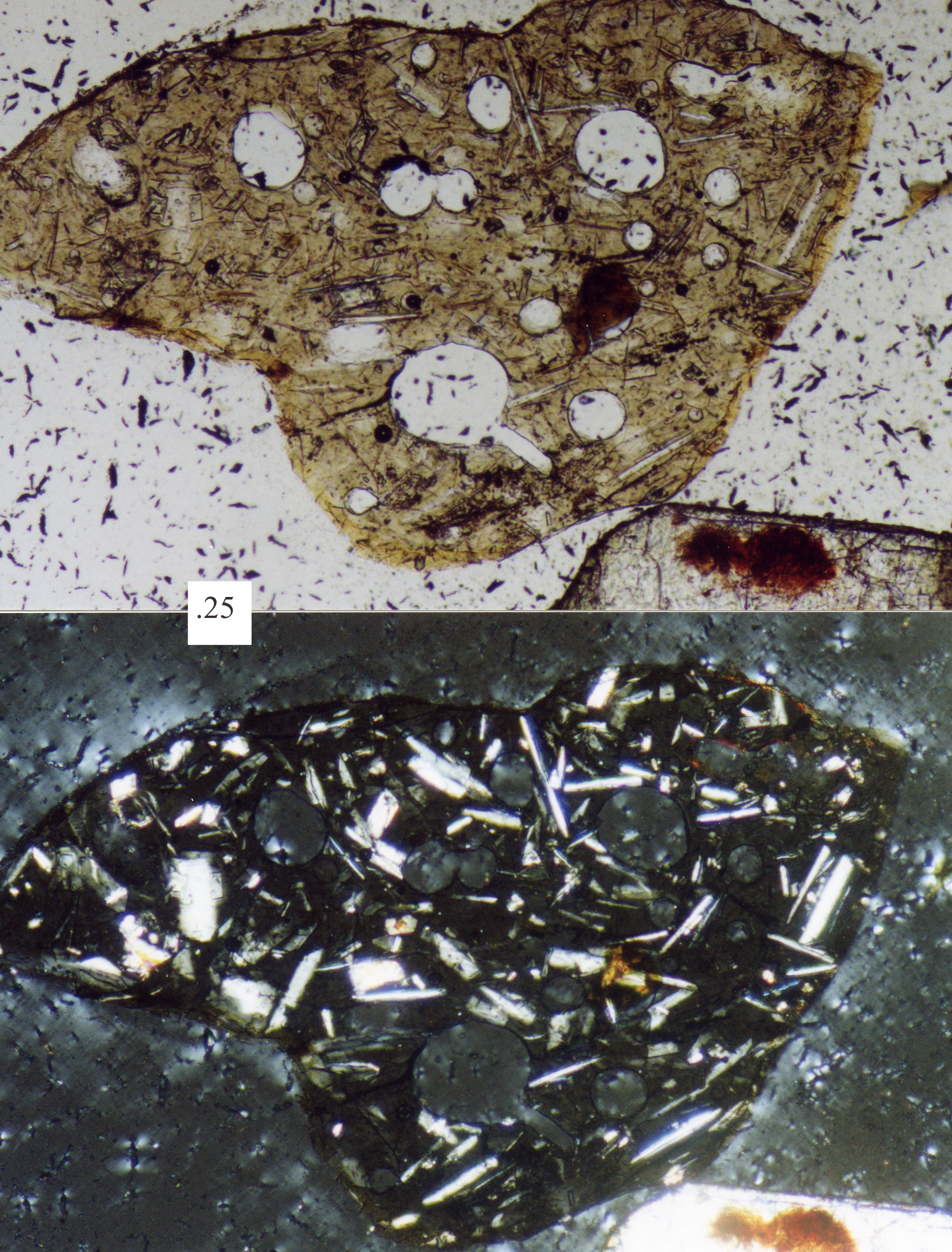
Photomicrograph of a volcanic lithic fragment (sand grain); upper picture is plane-polarized light, bottom picture is cross-polarized light, scale box at left-center is 0.25 millimeter.

Volcanic rocks are usually fine-grained or aphanitic to glass in texture. They often contain clasts of other rocks and phenocrysts. Phenocrysts are crystals that are larger than the matrix and are identifiable with the unaided eye. Rhomb porphyry is an example with large rhomb shaped phenocrysts embedded in a very fine grained matrix.

Volcanic rocks often have a vesicular texture caused by voids left by volatiles trapped in the molten lava. Pumice is a highly vesicular rock produced in explosive volcanic eruptions.

=== Chemistry ===
Most modern petrologists classify igneous rocks, including volcanic rocks, by their chemistry when dealing with their origin. The fact that different mineralogies and textures may be developed from the same initial magmas has led petrologists to rely heavily on chemistry to look at a volcanic rock's origin.

IUGS 'total alkali silicates' classification of aphanitic volcanic rocks according to their relative alkali (Na_{2}O + K_{2}O) and silica (SiO_{2}) weight contents. Blue area is roughly where alkaline rocks plot; yellow area where subalkaline rocks plot. Original source: *Le Maitre, R.W. (ed.); 1989: A classification of igneous rocks and glossary of terms, Blackwell Science, Oxford.

The chemical classification of igneous rocks using the TAS classification is based first on the total content of silicon and alkali metals (sodium and potassium) expressed as weight fraction of silica and alkali oxides (K_{2}O plus Na_{2}O). These place the rock in one of the fields of the TAS diagram. Ultramafic rock and carbonatites have their own specialized classification, but these rarely occur as volcanic rocks. Some fields of the TAS diagram are further subdivided by the ratio of potassium oxide to sodium oxide. Additional classifications may be made on the basis of other components, such as aluminum or iron content.

Volcanic rocks are also broadly divided into subalkaline, alkaline, and peralkaline volcanic rocks. Subalkaline rocks are defined as rocks in which

SiO_{2} < -3.3539 × 10^{−4} × A^{6} + 1.2030 × 10^{−2} × A^{5} - 1.5188 × 10^{−1} × A^{4} + 8.6096 × 10^{−1} × A^{3} - 2.1111 × A^{2} + 3.9492 × A + 39.0

where both silica and total alkali oxide content (A) are expressed as molar fraction. Because the TAS diagram uses weight fraction and the boundary between alkaline and subalkaline rock is defined in terms of molar fraction, the position of this curve on the TAS diagram is only approximate. Peralkaline volcanic rocks are defined as rocks having Na_{2}O + K_{2}O > Al_{2}O_{3}, so that some of the alkali oxides must be present in sodic pyroxenes such as aegirine or sodic amphibole in addition to in feldspar.

The chemistry of volcanic rocks is dependent on two things: the initial composition of the primary magma and the subsequent differentiation. Differentiation of most magmas tends to increase the silica (SiO_{2}) content, mainly by crystal fractionation. The initial composition of most magmas is basaltic, albeit small differences in initial compositions may result in multiple differentiation series. The most common of these series are the subalkaline (tholeiitic, calc-alkaline) and alkaline.

=== Mineralogy ===
Most volcanic rocks share a number of common minerals. Differentiation of volcanic rocks tends to increase the silica (SiO_{2}) content mainly by fractional crystallization. Thus, more evolved volcanic rocks tend to be richer in minerals with a higher amount of silica such as phyllo and tectosilicates including the feldspars, quartz polymorphs and muscovite. While still dominated by silicates, more primitive volcanic rocks have mineral assemblages with less silica, such as olivine and the pyroxenes. Bowen's reaction series correctly predicts the order of formation of the most common minerals in volcanic rocks.

Occasionally, a magma may pick up crystals that crystallized from another magma; these crystals are called xenocrysts. Diamonds found in kimberlites are rare but well-known xenocrysts; the kimberlites do not create the diamonds, but pick them up and transport them to the surface of the Earth.

== Naming ==
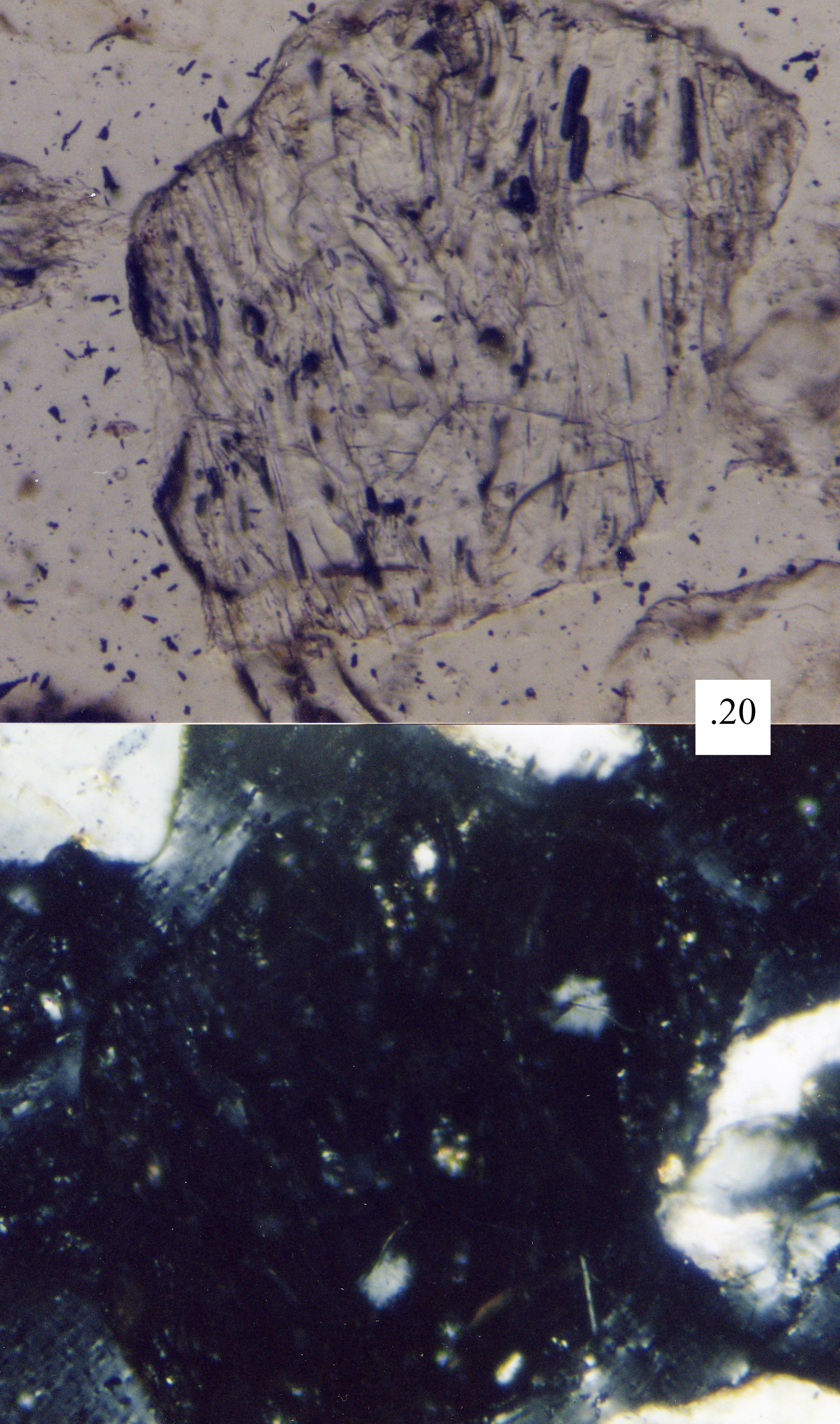
An aphanitic volcanic sand grain, with fine-grained groundmass, as seen under a petrographic microscope

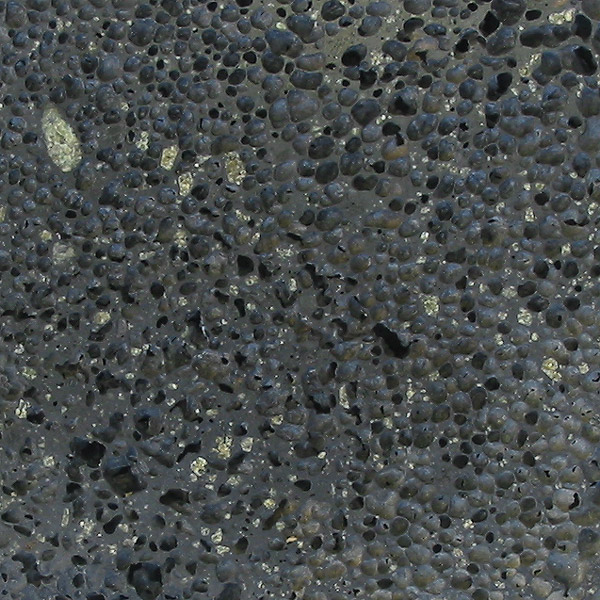
Vesicular olivine basalt from La Palma (green phenocrysts are olivine).

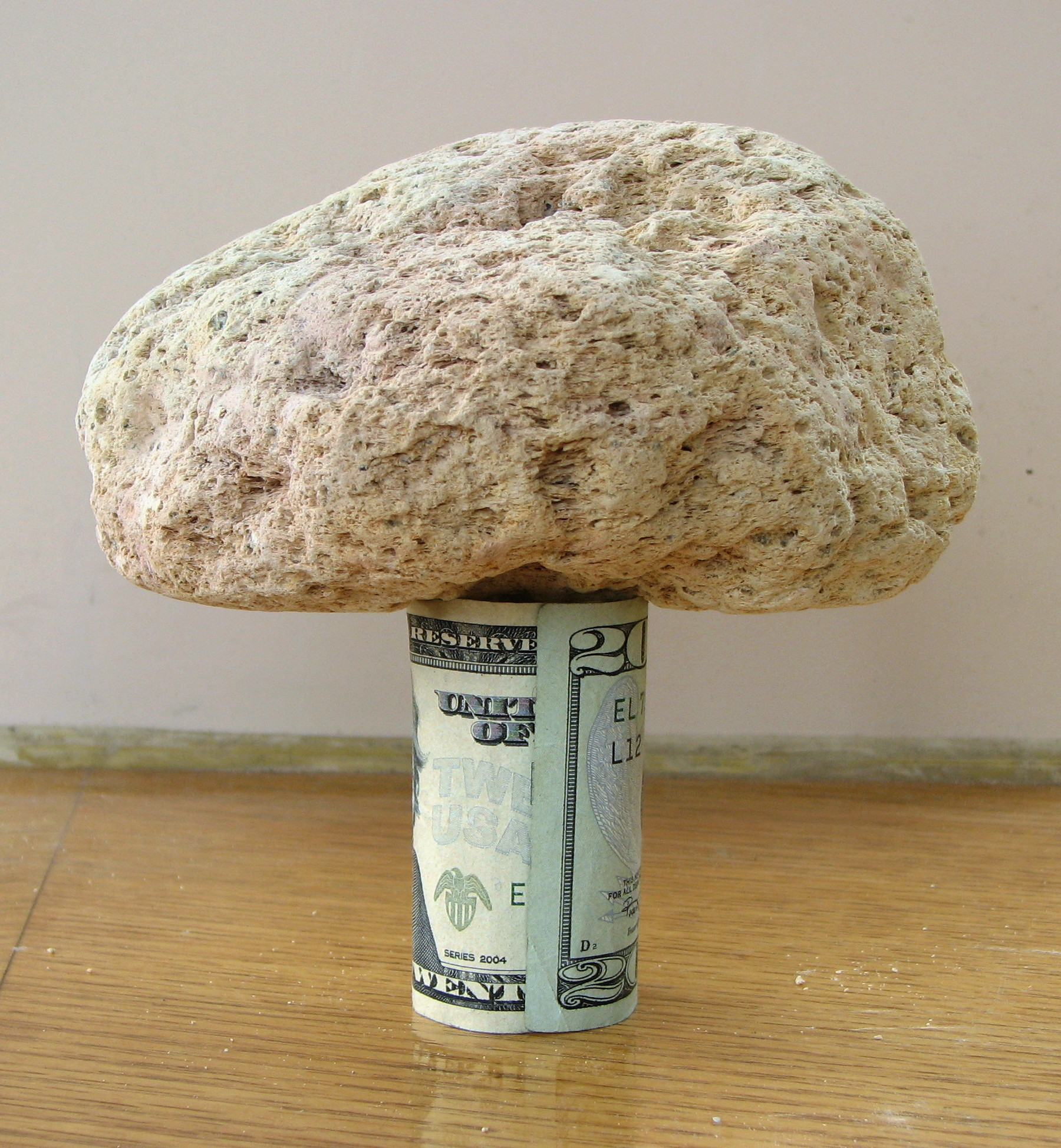
A 15-centimeter (5.9 in) piece of pumice supported by a rolled U.S. $20 bill demonstrates its very low density.

Volcanic rocks are named according to both their chemical composition and texture. Basalt is a very common volcanic rock with low silica content. Rhyolite is a volcanic rock with high silica content. Rhyolite has silica content similar to that of granite while basalt is compositionally equal to gabbro. Intermediate volcanic rocks include andesite, dacite, trachyte, and latite.

Pyroclastic rocks are the product of explosive volcanism. They are often felsic (high in silica). Pyroclastic rocks are often the result of volcanic debris, such as ash, bombs and tephra, and other volcanic ejecta. Examples of pyroclastic rocks are tuff and ignimbrite.

Shallow intrusions, which possess structure similar to volcanic rather than plutonic rocks, are also considered to be volcanic, shading into subvolcanic.

The terms lava stone and lava rock are more used by marketers than geologists, who would likely say "volcanic rock" (because lava is a molten liquid and rock is solid). "Lava stone" may describe anything from a friable silicic pumice to solid mafic flow basalt, and is sometimes used to describe rocks that were never lava, but look as if they were (such as sedimentary limestone with dissolution pitting). To convey anything about the physical or chemical properties of the rock, a more specific term should be used; a good supplier will know what sort of volcanic rock they are selling.

== Composition of volcanic rocks ==
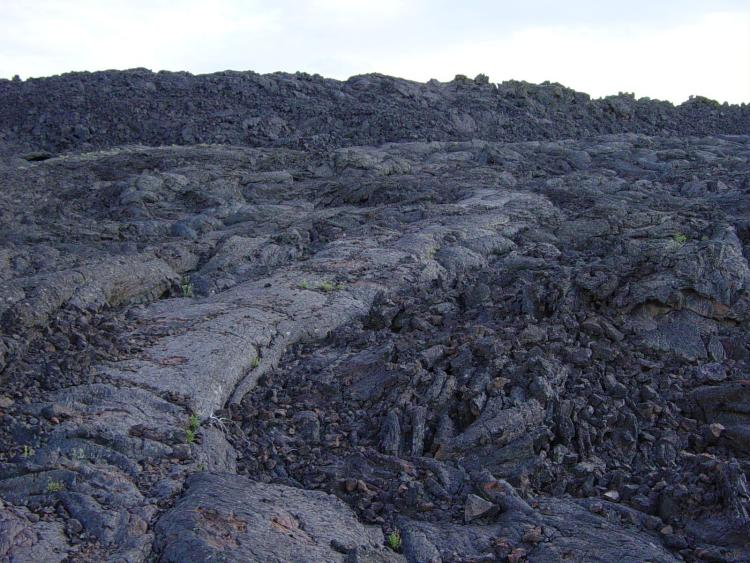
ʻAʻā next to pāhoehoe lava at the Craters of the Moon National Monument and Preserve, Idaho, United States.

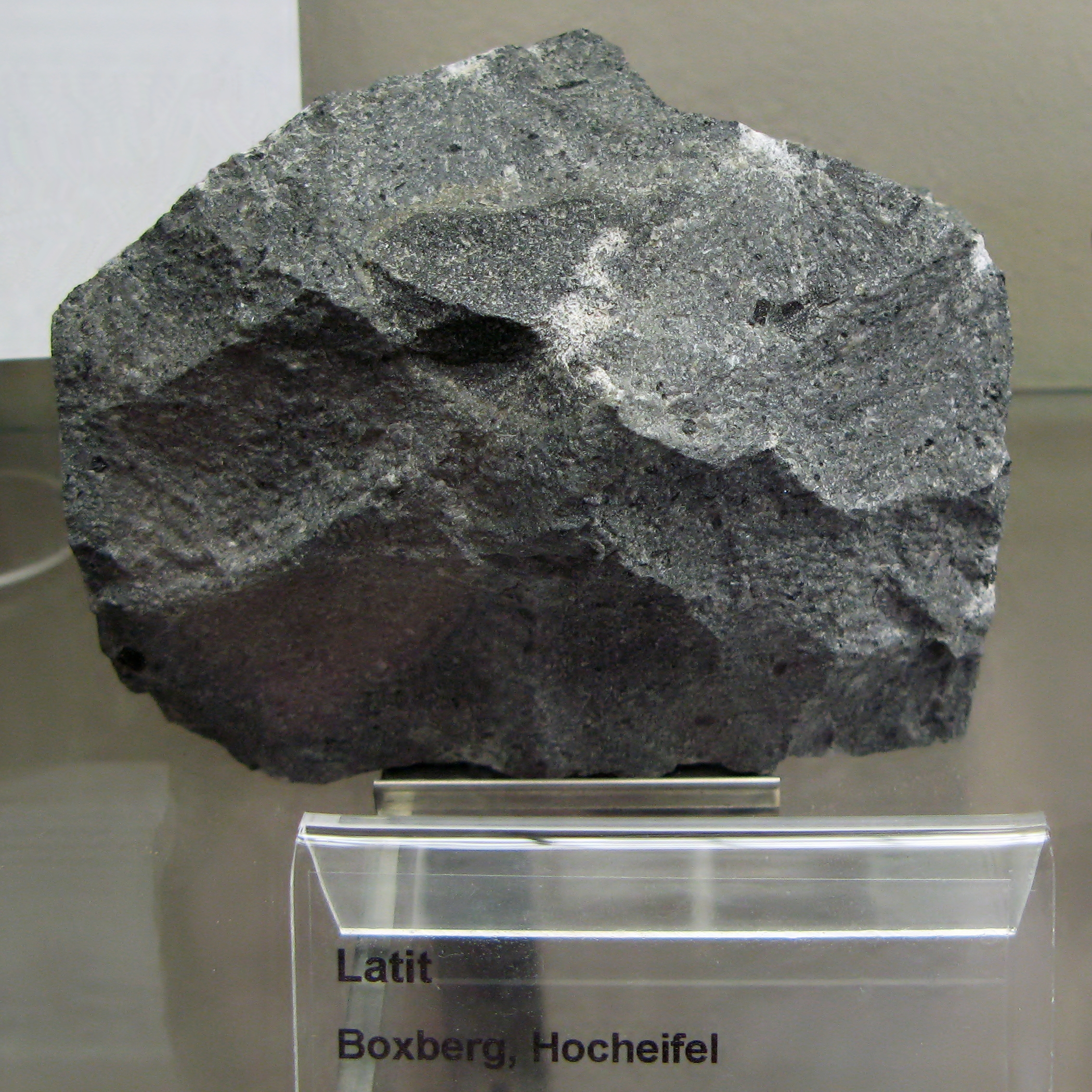
A German example of latite, a type of volcanic rock

The sub-family of rocks that form from volcanic lava are called igneous volcanic rocks (to differentiate them from igneous rocks that form from magma below the surface, called igneous plutonic rocks).

The lavas of different volcanoes, when cooled and hardened, differ much in their appearance and composition. If a rhyolite lava-stream cools quickly, it can quickly freeze into a black glassy substance called obsidian. When filled with bubbles of gas, the same lava may form the spongy appearing pumice. Allowed to cool slowly, it forms a light-colored, uniformly solid rock called rhyolite.

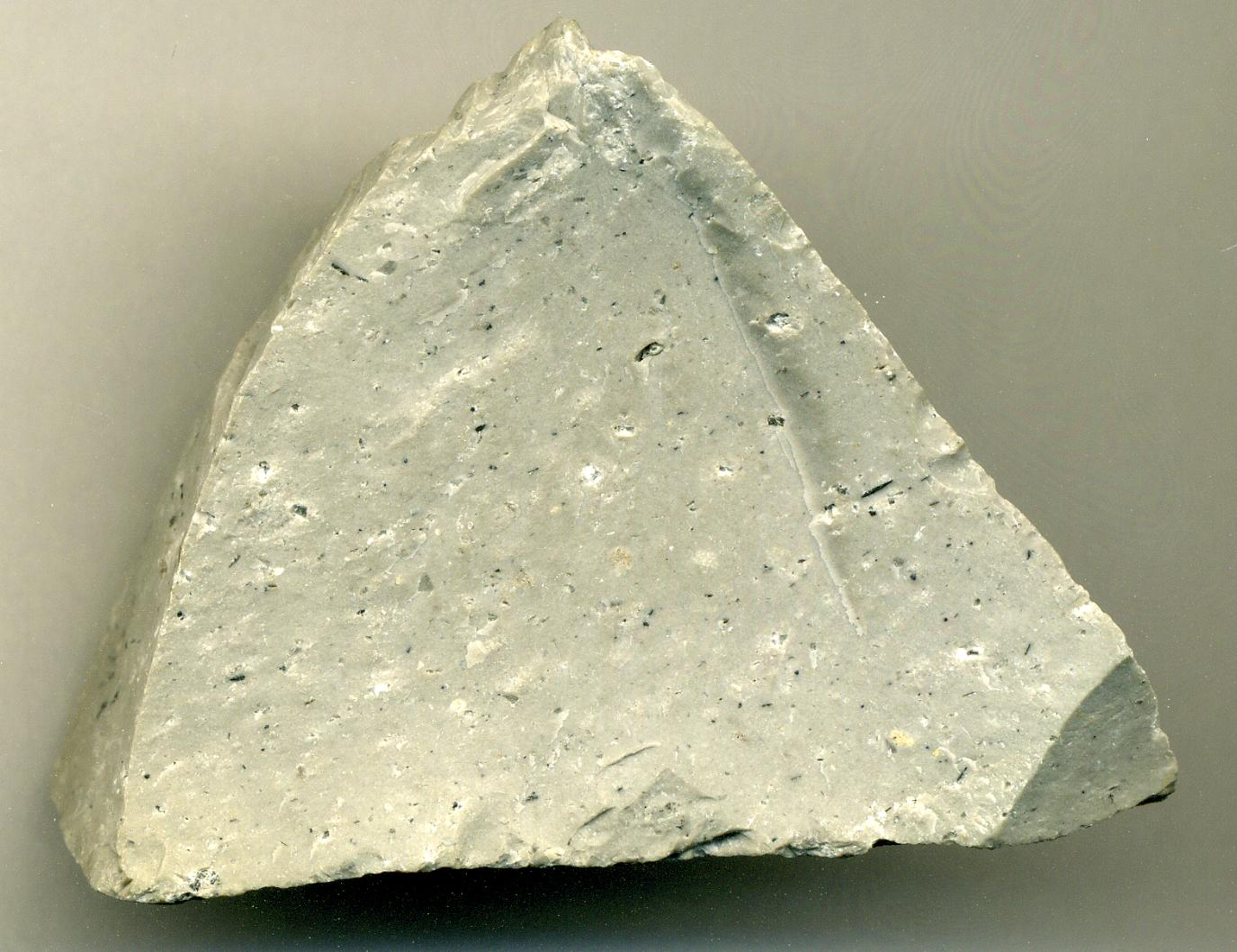
A sample of rhyolite

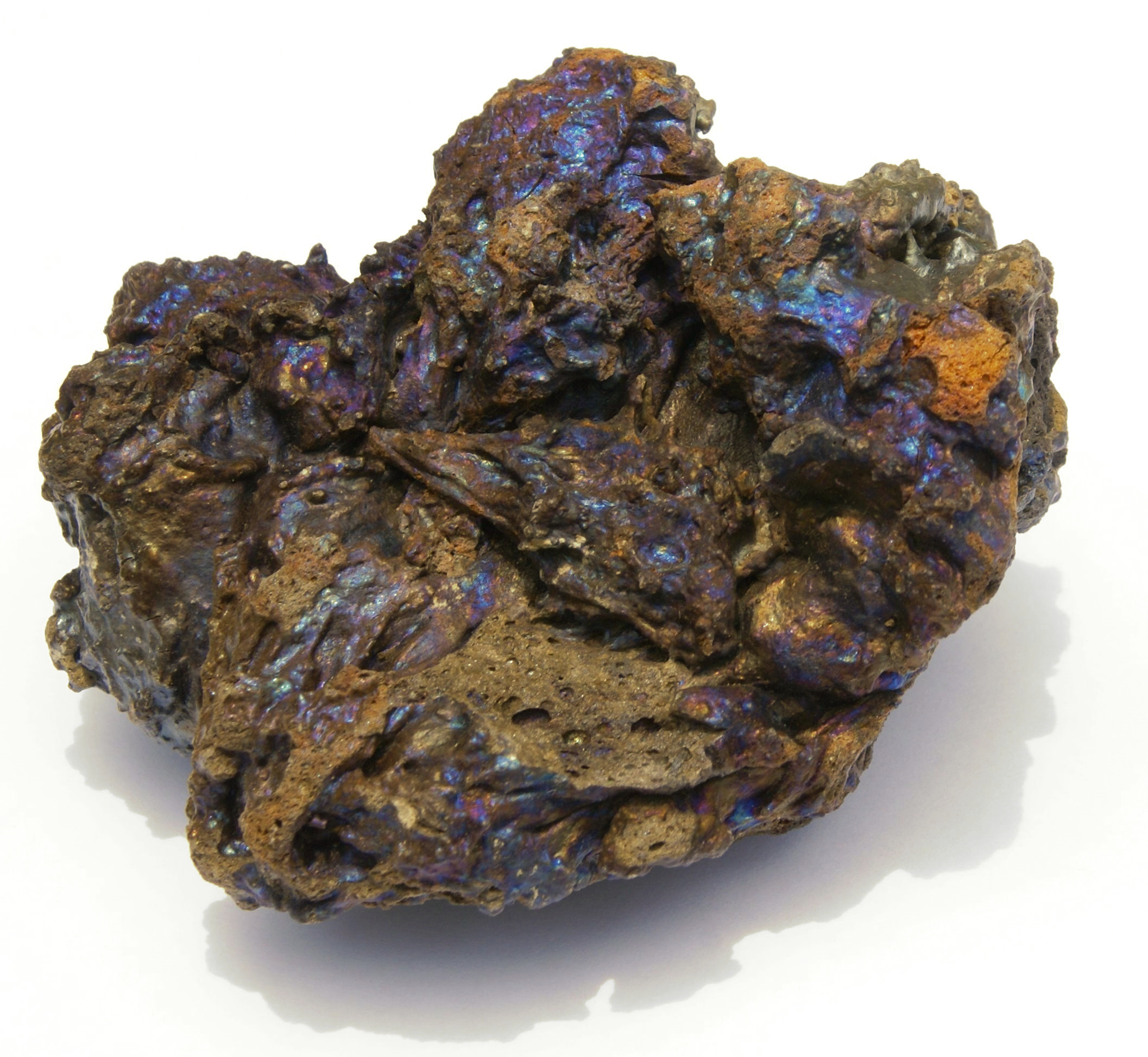
Basaltic scoria from Amsterdam Island in the Indian Ocean

The lavas, having cooled rapidly in contact with the air or water, are mostly finely crystalline or have at least fine-grained ground-mass representing that part of the viscous semi-crystalline lava flow that was still liquid at the moment of eruption. At this time they were exposed only to atmospheric pressure, and the steam and other gases, which they contained in great quantity were free to escape; many important modifications arise from this, the most striking being the frequent presence of numerous steam cavities (vesicular structure) often drawn out to elongated shapes subsequently filled up with minerals by infiltration (amygdaloidal structure).

As crystallization was going on while the mass was still creeping forward under the surface of the Earth, the latest formed minerals (in the ground-mass) are commonly arranged in subparallel winding lines that follow the direction of movement (fluxion or fluidal structure)—and larger early minerals that previously crystallized may show the same arrangement. Most lavas fall considerably below their original temperatures before emitted. In their behavior, they present a close analogy to hot solutions of salts in water, which, when they approach the saturation temperature, first deposit a crop of large, well-formed crystals (labile stage) and subsequently precipitate clouds of smaller less perfect crystalline particles (metastable stage).

In igneous rocks the first generation of crystals generally forms before the lava has emerged to the surface, that is to say, during the ascent from the subterranean depths to the crater of the volcano. It has frequently been verified by observation that freshly emitted lavas contain large crystals borne along in a molten, liquid mass. The large, well-formed, early crystals (phenocrysts) are said to be porphyritic; the smaller crystals of the surrounding matrix or ground-mass belong to the post-effusion stage. More rarely lavas are completely fused at the moment of ejection; they may then cool to form a non-porphyritic, finely crystalline rock, or if more rapidly chilled may in large part be non-crystalline or glassy (vitreous rocks such as obsidian, tachylyte, pitchstone).

A common feature of glassy rocks is the presence of rounded bodies (spherulites), consisting of fine divergent fibres radiating from a center; they consist of imperfect crystals of feldspar, mixed with quartz or tridymite; similar bodies are often produced artificially in glasses that are allowed to cool slowly. Rarely these spherulites are hollow or consist of concentric shells with spaces between (lithophysae). Perlitic structure, also common in glasses, consists of the presence of concentric rounded cracks owing to contraction on cooling.

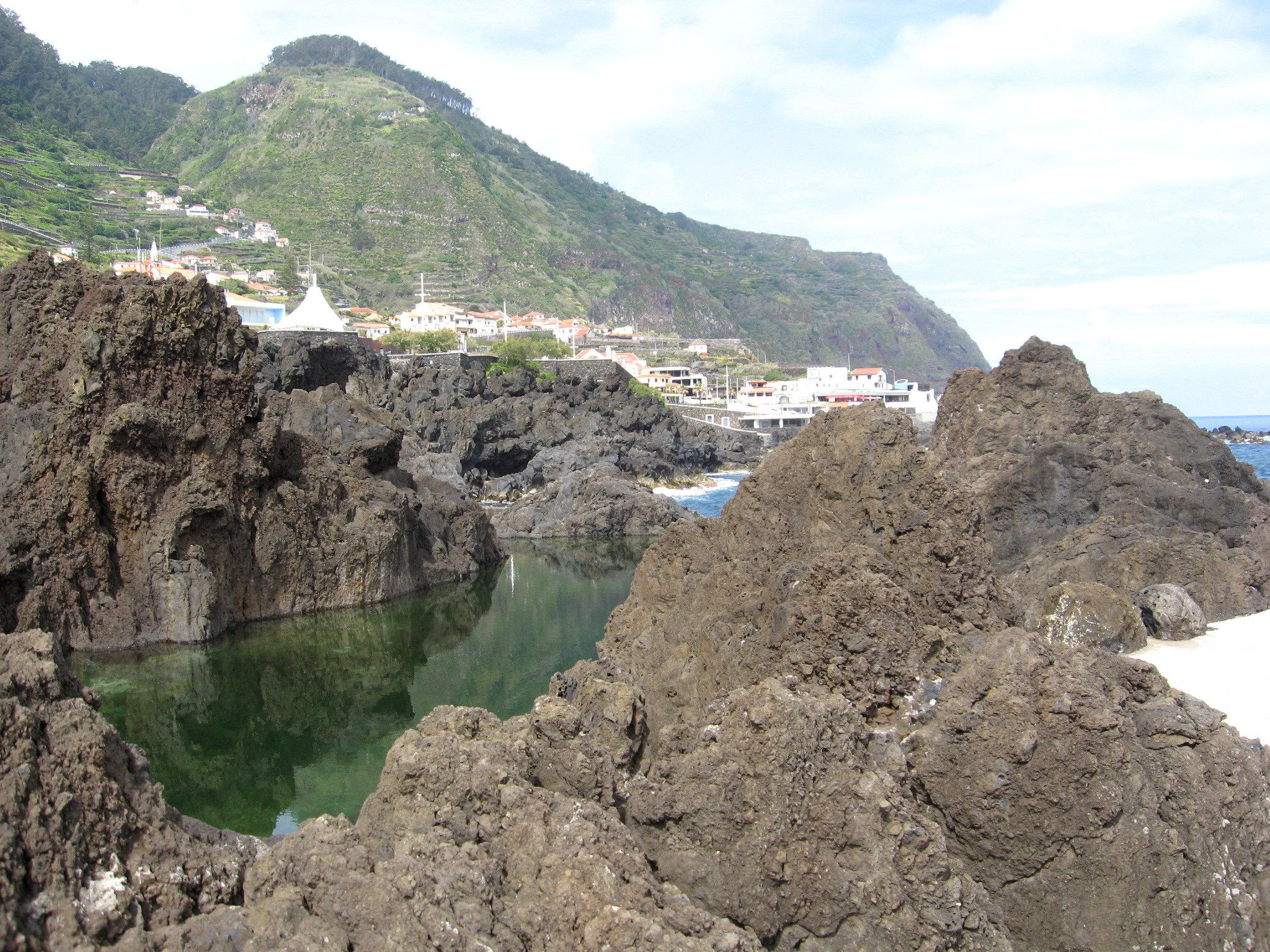
Volcanic rocks, Porto Moniz, Madeira

The phenocrysts or porphyritic minerals are not only larger than those of the ground-mass; as the matrix was still liquid when they formed they were free to take perfect crystalline shapes, without interference by the pressure of adjacent crystals. They seem to have grown rapidly, as they are often filled with enclosures of glassy or finely crystalline material like that of the ground-mass. Microscopic examination of the phenocrysts often reveals that they have had a complex history. Very frequently they show layers of different composition, indicated by variations in color or other optical properties; thus augite may be green in the center surrounded by various shades of brown; or they may be pale green centrally and darker green with strong pleochroism (aegirine) at the periphery.

In the feldspars the center is usually richer in calcium than the surrounding layers, and successive zones may often be noted, each less calcic than those within it. Phenocrysts of quartz (and of other minerals), instead of sharp, perfect crystalline faces, may show rounded corroded surfaces, with the points blunted and irregular tongue-like projections of the matrix into the substance of the crystal. It is clear that after the mineral had crystallized it was partly again dissolved or corroded at some period before the matrix solidified.

Corroded phenocrysts of biotite and hornblende are very common in some lavas; they are surrounded by black rims of magnetite mixed with pale green augite. The hornblende or biotite substance has proved unstable at a certain stage of consolidation, and has been replaced by a paramorph of augite and magnetite, which may partially or completely substitute for the original crystal but still retains its characteristic outlines.

== Mechanical behaviour of volcanic rocks ==
The mechanical behaviour of volcanic rocks is complicated by their complex microstructure. For example, attributes such as the partitioning of the void space (pores and microcracks), pore and crystal size and shape, and hydrothermal alteration can all vary widely in volcanic rocks and can all influence the resultant mechanical behaviour (e.g., Young's modulus, compressive and tensile strength, and the pressure at which they transition from brittle to ductile behaviour). As for other crustal rocks, volcanic rocks are brittle and ductile at low and high effective confining pressures, respectively. Brittle behaviour is manifest as faults and fractures, and ductile behaviour can either be distributed (cataclastic pore collapse) or localised (compaction bands). Understanding the mechanical behaviour of volcanic rocks can help us better understand volcanic hazards, such as flank collapse.

== See also ==
- Extrusive rock
- Intrusive rock
