= Blockfield =

Surface covered by irregular rocks

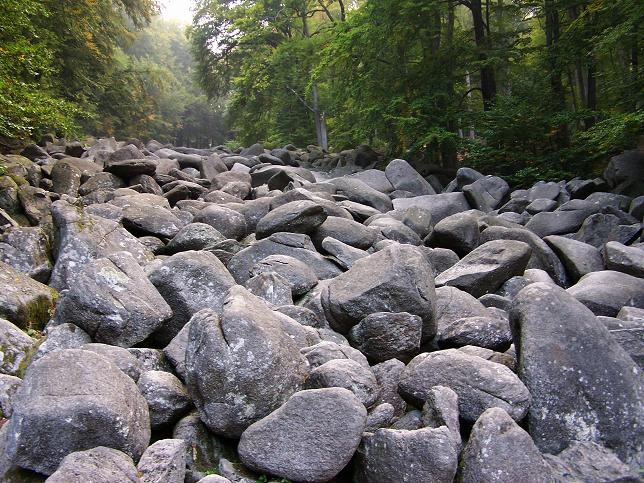
Felsenmeer in Lautertal-Reichenbach (Odenwald)

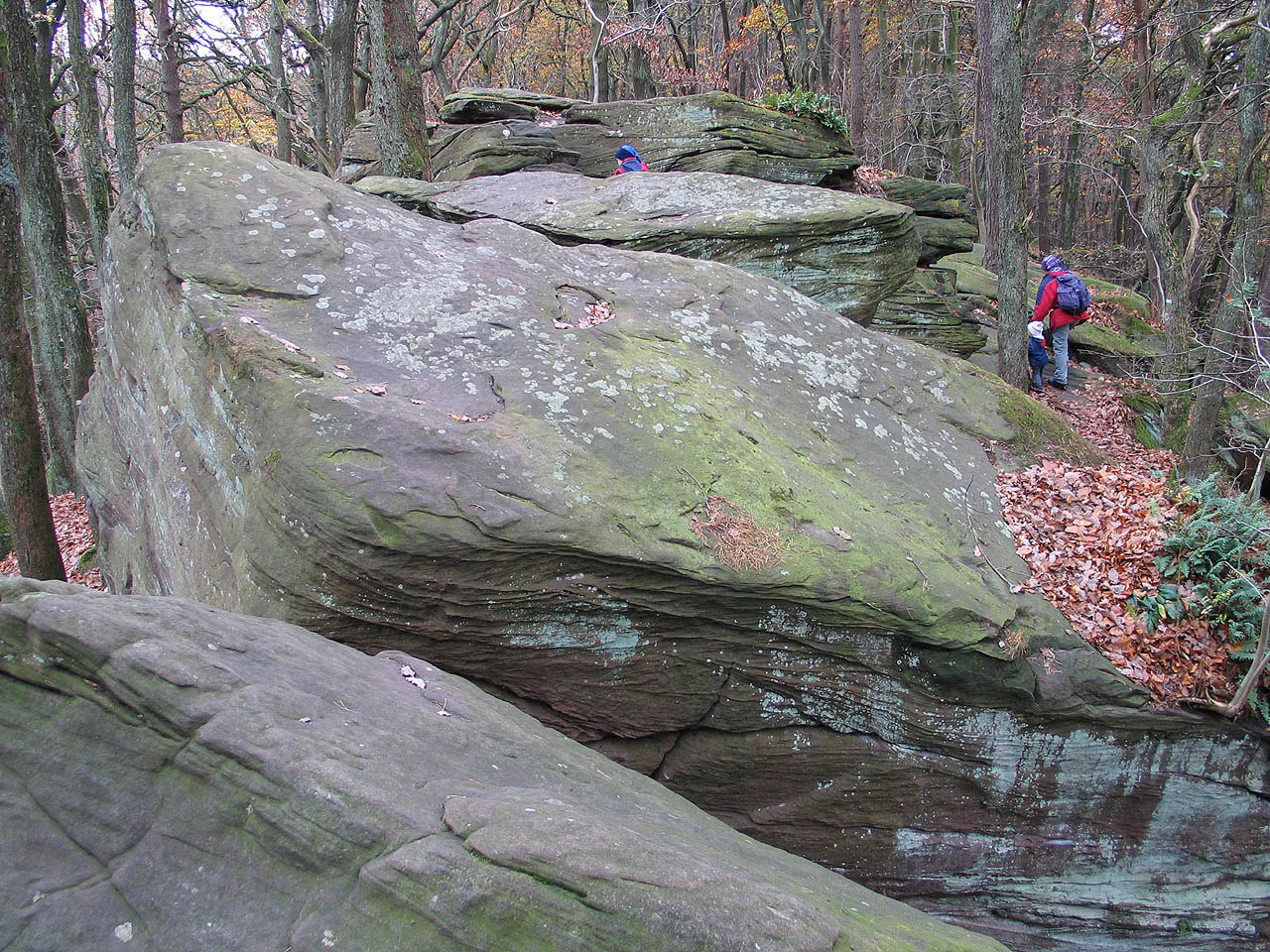
Felsenmeer on the Kalmit in the Palatine Forest

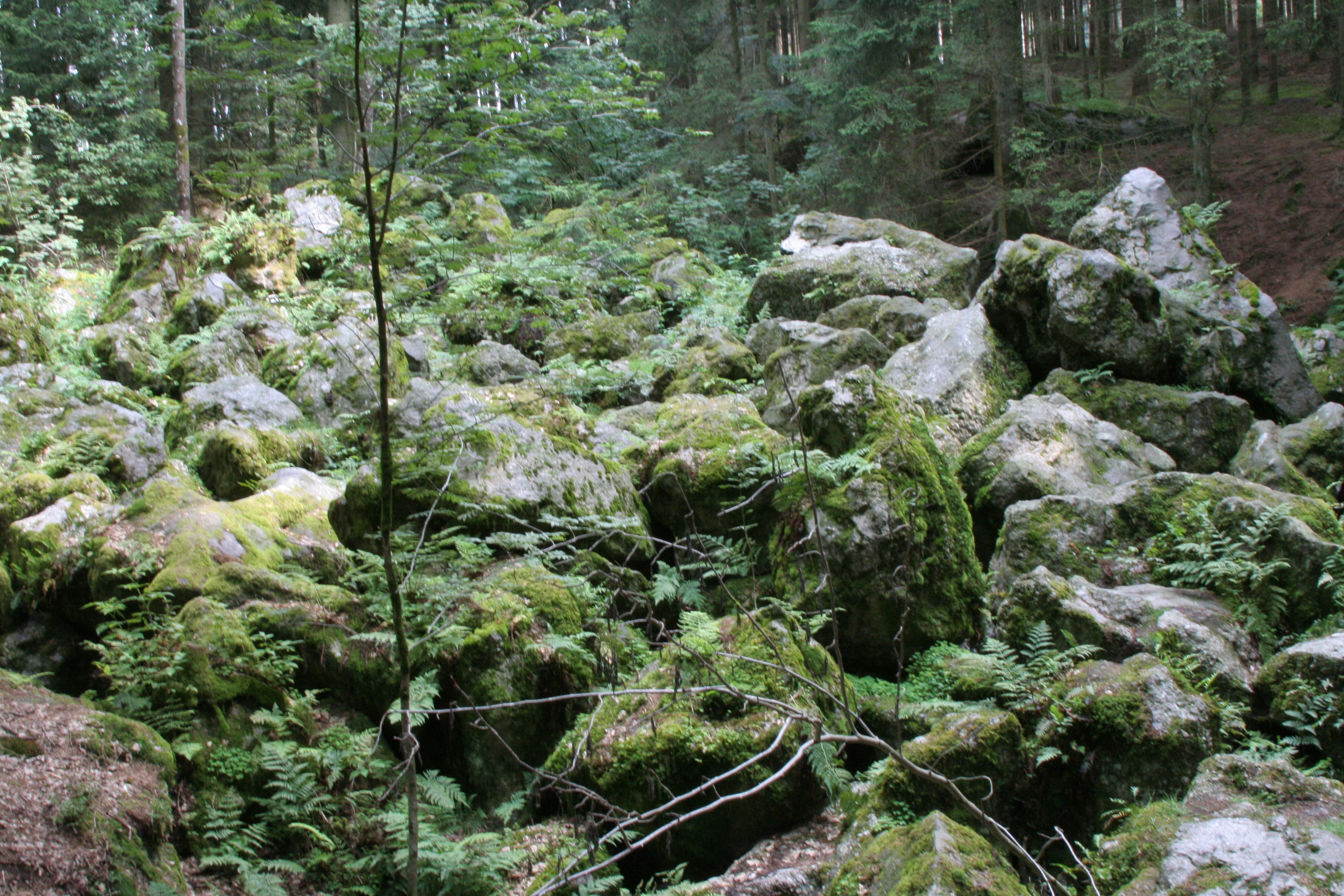
Boulder stream of the Kaser Steinstube near Triftern

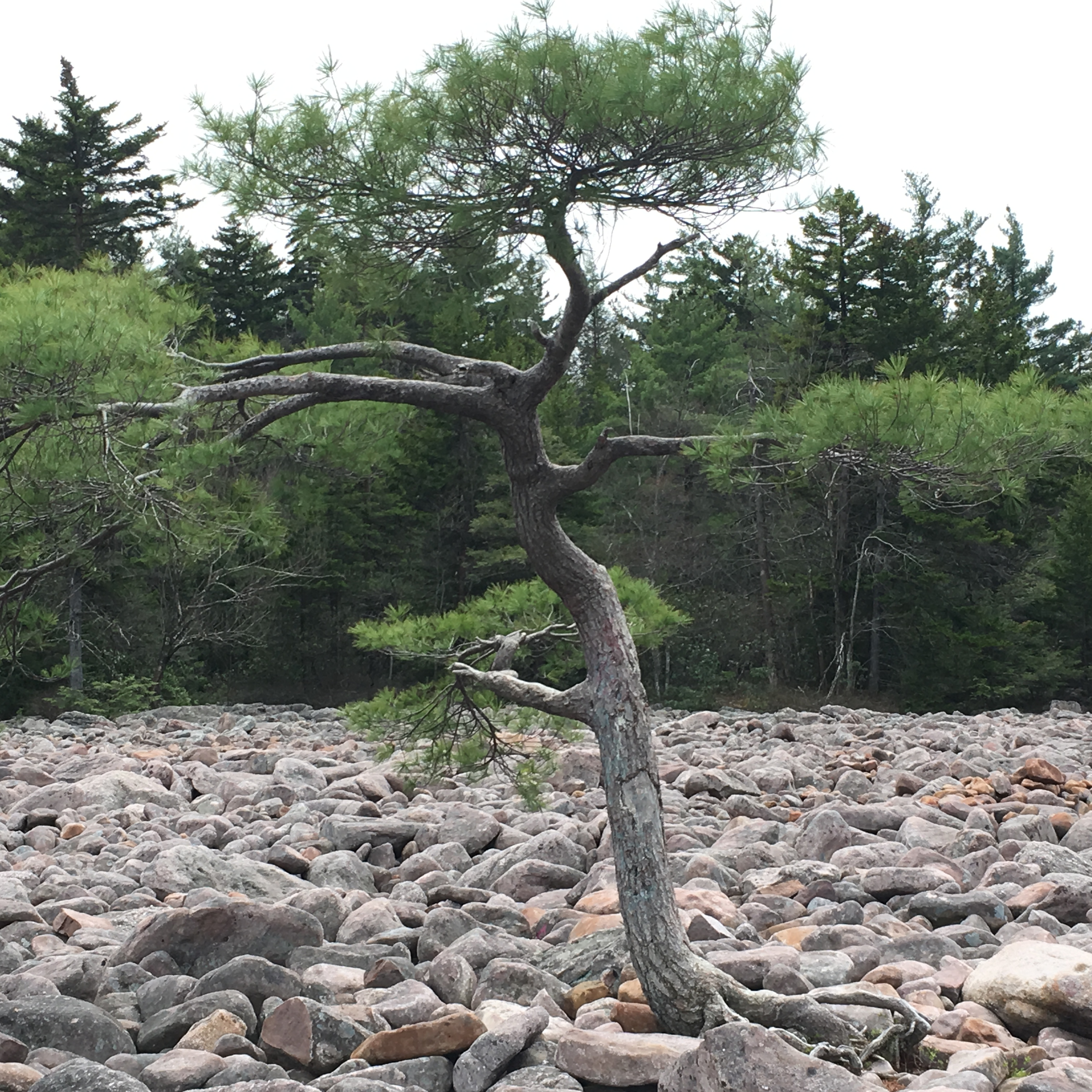
A photo of a single eastern white pine in the nearly barren Boulder Field, Hickory Run State Park, PA.

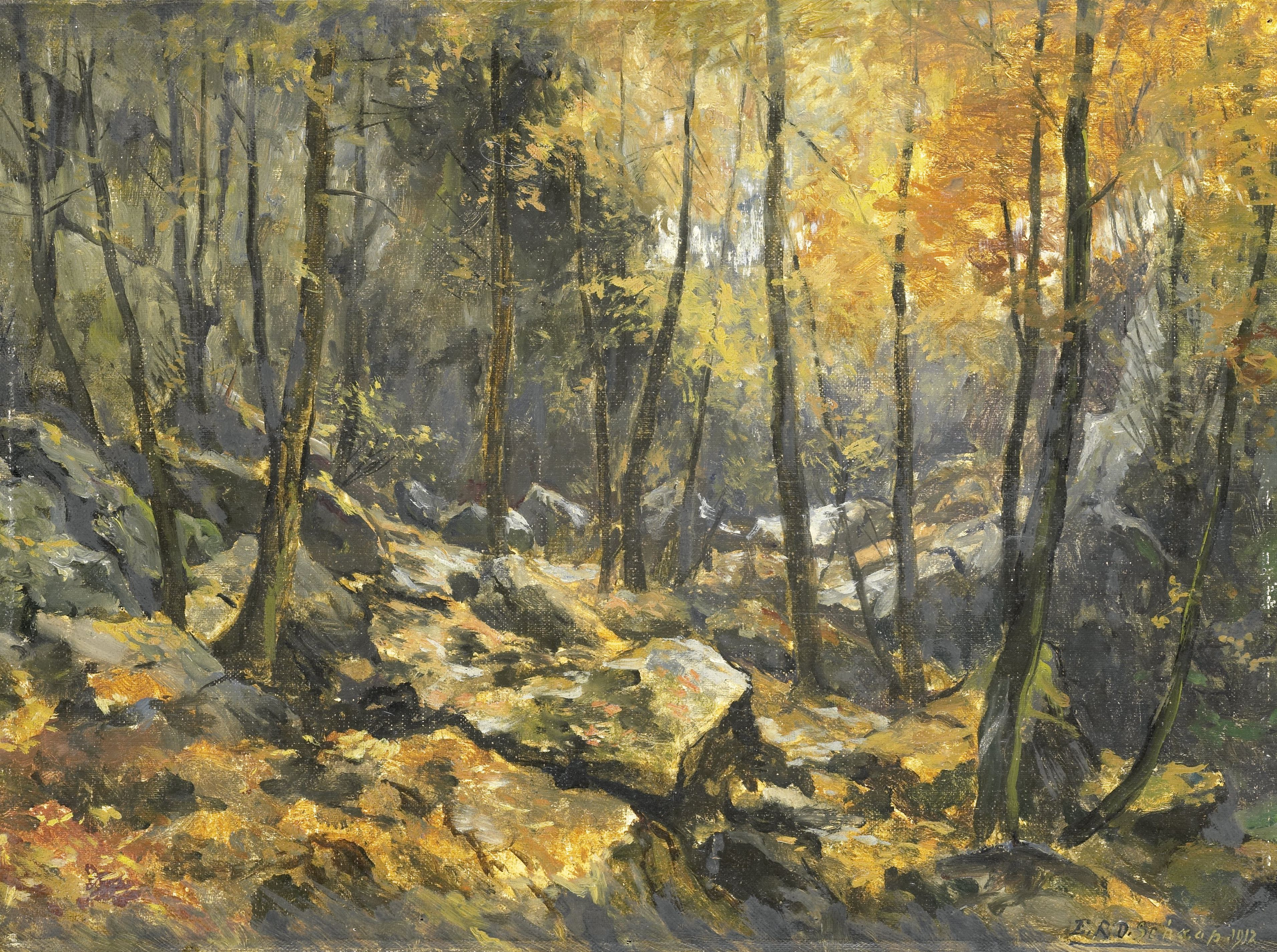
Felsenmeer, painting by Egbert Schaap (1912). Rijksmuseum Amsterdam

A blockfield (also spelt block field), felsenmeer, boulder field or stone field is a surface covered by boulder- or block-sized rocks usually associated with a history of alpine and subpolar climates and periglaciation. Blockfields differ from screes and talus slope in that blockfields do not apparently originate from mass wastings. They are believed to be formed by frost weathering below the surface. An alternative theory that modern blockfields may have originated from chemical weathering that occurred in the Neogene when the climate was relatively warmer. Following this thought the blockfields would then have been reworked by periglacial action.

Most known blockfields are located in the northern hemisphere. Examples can be found in Abisko National Park in Sweden, Snowdonia National Park in Wales, the Great End-Scafell Pike ridge in England, and Hickory Run Boulder Field and River of Rocks in the Appalachian Mountains of the United States. All examples except the first one are outside present day subpolar climate areas, and have thus traditionally been seen as relict landforms from past times when these areas were under periglaciation.

The term "felsenmeer" comes from the German meaning "sea of rock". In a felsenmeer or blockfield, freeze-thaw weathering has broken up the top layer of the rock, covering the underlying rock formation with jagged, angular boulders. Freeze-thaw or frost weathering occurs when water that is trapped along microcracks in rock expands and contracts due to fluctuations in temperature above and below the freezing point. Felsenmeers are formed in situ, meaning that they are not transported during or after their creation.

== Characteristics ==
=== Surface ===
Felsenmeers only form on slopes of 25° or lower. A steeper angle results in transport of the blocks due to gravity. This creates a talus slope, rather than a felsenmeer. Crude sorting with boulder imbrication can occasionally be seen on the surface of felsenmeers.

=== Profile ===
The depth of the boulder field depends on the slope angle, rock types, age, and erosional history. However, a reasonable average for felsenmeer depth is approximately 1 m. Ballantyne (1998) defines three types of felsenmeer profiles: Type 1 consists of boulders overlying a matrix of fines at some depth below the surface. Type 2 consists of boulders supported by a cohesionless sandy matrix that continues from the surface down through the profile. Type 3 also consists of boulders supported by a matrix, but differs from Type 2 in that the matrix consists of silt and/or clay rather than sand.

== Occurrence ==
Due to the slope requirements they are most commonly found on plateaus. Basalt and sedimentary rocks often produce larger, more numerous felsenmeers than other types of rock. Blockfields are most often found in high mountain periglacial regions near the Arctic Circle, especially in Iceland, the Canadian arctic and Norway and are still active in parts of Central Europe that were not covered by ice sheets. In the Southern Hemisphere inactive blockfields can be found in the Lesotho Highlands, and the Prince Edward Islands.

== Age ==
Felsenmeers are, typically, relatively young geomorphological features. Most felsenmeers formed during or since the last ice age (approximately 20,000 years ago). Others may be pre-glacial features that survived glaciation beneath cold-based glaciers. Their specific age can be determined using surface exposure dating, a technique that works best on materials which have been exposed to cosmic rays with little interference from trees or soils.

== See also ==
- Stone run
- Weathering
- Floater
