= Fracture (geology) =

Geologic discontinuity feature, often a joint or fault

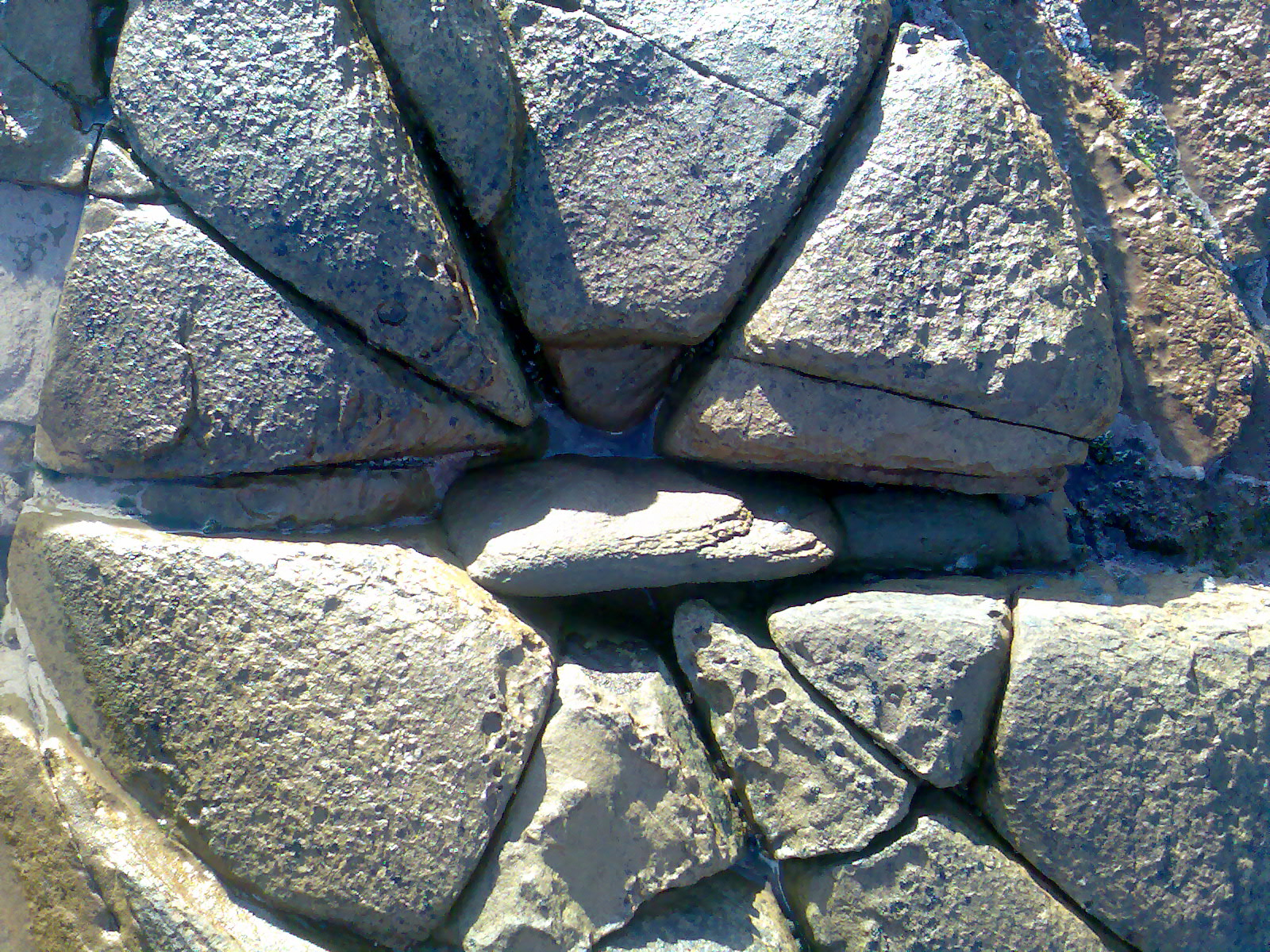
A fractured rock in the Eastern Cape in South Africa, a mechanism of brittle deformation in response to stress

A fracture is any separation in a geologic formation, such as a joint or a fault that divides the rock into two or more pieces. A fracture will sometimes form a deep fissure or crevice in the rock. Fractures are commonly caused by stress exceeding the rock strength, causing the rock to lose cohesion along its weakest plane. Fractures can provide permeability for fluid movement, such as water or hydrocarbons. Highly fractured rocks can make good aquifers or hydrocarbon reservoirs, since they may possess both significant permeability and fracture porosity.

== Brittle deformation ==
Fractures are forms of brittle deformation. There are two types of primary brittle deformation processes. Tensile fracturing results in joints. Shear fractures are the first initial breaks resulting from shear forces exceeding the cohesive strength in that plane.

After those two initial deformations, several other types of secondary brittle deformation can be observed, such as frictional sliding or cataclastic flow on reactivated joints or faults.

Most often, fracture profiles will look like either a blade, ellipsoid, or circle.

== Causes ==
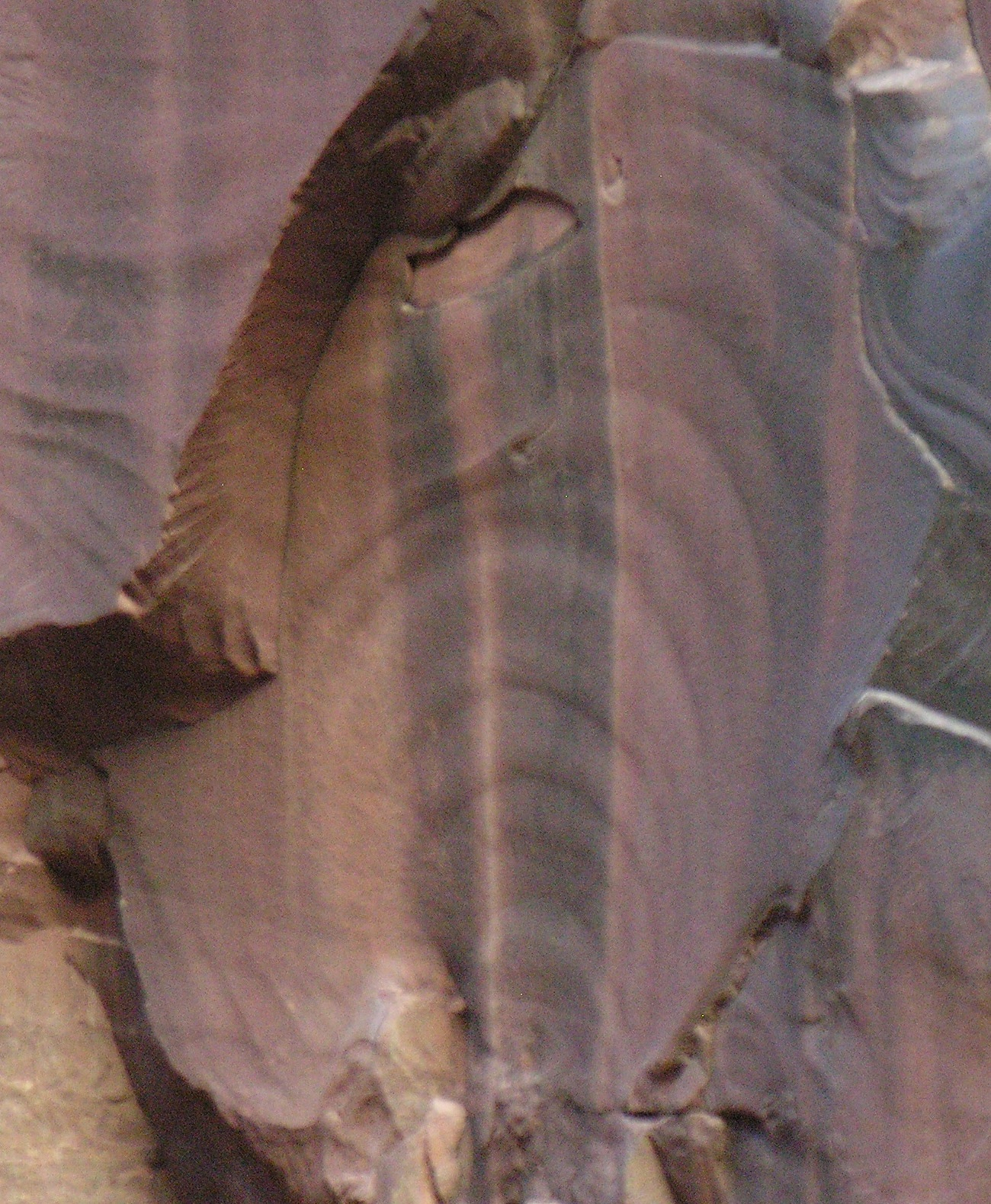
The concentric circles in this sandstone in Arizona are plumose (plume-like) structures that can form during the formation and propagation of a fracture

Fractures in rocks can be formed either due to compression or tension. Fractures due to compression include thrust faults. Fractures may also be a result from shear or tensile stress. Some of the primary mechanisms are discussed below.

=== Modes ===
First, there are three modes of fractures that occur (regardless of mechanism):

- Mode I crack – Opening mode (a tensile stress normal to the plane of the crack)
- Mode II crack – Sliding mode (a shear stress acting parallel to the plane of the crack and perpendicular to the crack front)
- Mode III crack – Tearing mode (a shear stress acting parallel to the plane of the crack and parallel to the crack front)

For more information on this, see fracture mechanics.

=== Tensile fractures ===
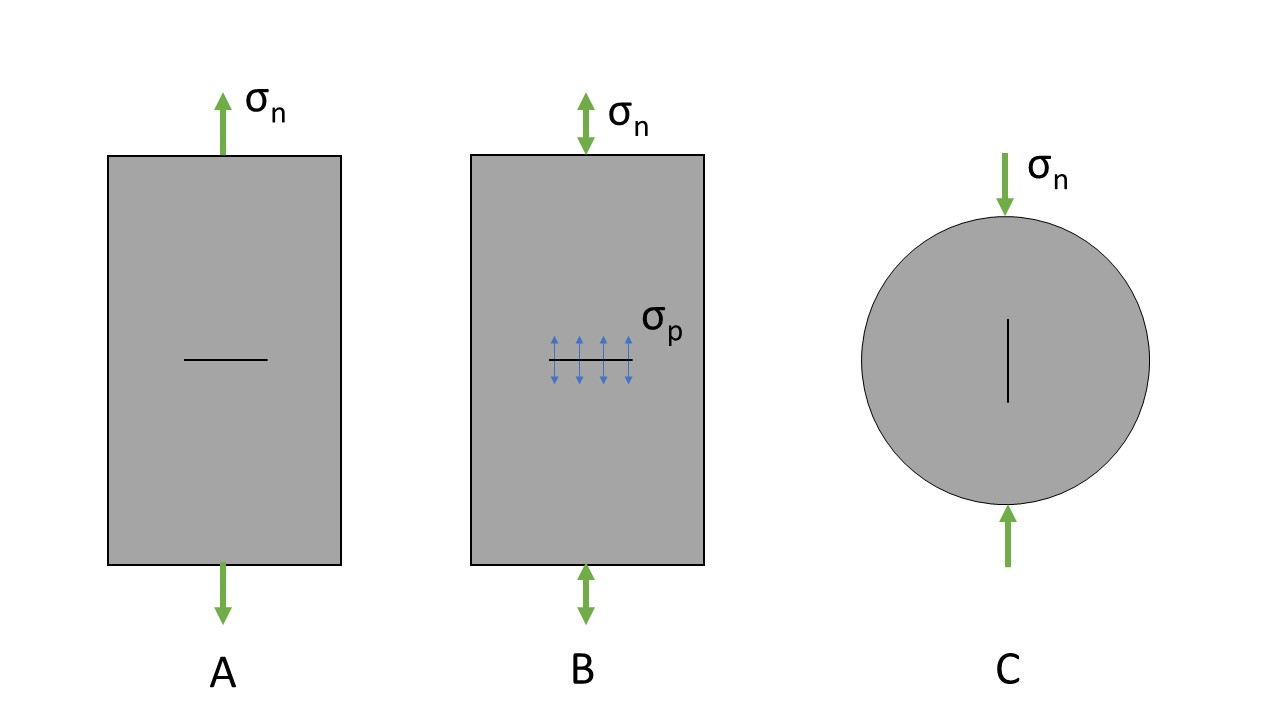
Cartoon examples of common tensile fracture mechanisms in laboratory rock samples. A) Axial stretching: tension is applied far from the crack. B) Hydraulic fracturing: tension or compression is applied far away from the crack and fluid pressure increases, causing tension on the face of the cracks. C) Brazilian disc test: applied compressive loads parallel to the crack cause the sides of the disk to bulge out and tension to occur on the crack faces.

Rocks contain many pre-existing cracks where development of tensile fracture, or Mode I fracture, may be examined.

The first form is in axial stretching. In this case a remote tensile stress, σ_{n}, is applied, allowing microcracks to open slightly throughout the tensile region. As these cracks open up, the stresses at the crack tips intensify, eventually exceeding the rock strength and allowing the fracture to propagate. This can occur at times of rapid overburden erosion. Folding also can provide tension, such as along the top of an anticlinal fold axis. In this scenario the tensile forces associated with the stretching of the upper half of the layers during folding can induce tensile fractures parallel to the fold axis.

Another, similar tensile fracture mechanism is hydraulic fracturing. In a natural environment, this occurs when rapid sediment compaction, thermal fluid expansion, or fluid injection causes the pore fluid pressure, σ_{p}, to exceed the pressure of the least principal normal stress, σ_{n}. When this occurs, a tensile fracture opens perpendicular to the plane of least stress.^{[4]}

Tensile fracturing may also be induced by applied compressive loads, σ_{n}, along an axis such as in a Brazilian disk test. This applied compression force results in longitudinal splitting. In this situation, tiny tensile fractures form parallel to the loading axis while the load also forces any other microfractures closed. To picture this, imagine an envelope, with loading from the top. A load is applied on the top edge, the sides of the envelope open outward, even though nothing was pulling on them. Rapid deposition and compaction can sometimes induce these fractures.

Tensile fractures are almost always referred to as joints, which are fractures where no appreciable slip or shear is observed.

To fully understand the effects of applied tensile stress around a crack in a brittle material such a rock, fracture mechanics can be used. The concept of fracture mechanics was initially developed by A. A. Griffith during World War I. Griffith looked at the energy required to create new surfaces by breaking material bonds versus the elastic strain energy of the stretched bonds released. By analyzing a rod under uniform tension Griffith determined an expression for the critical stress at which a favorably orientated crack will grow. The critical stress at fracture is given by,

$\sigma_f=({2E\gamma \over \pi a})^{1/2}$

where γ = surface energy associated with broken bonds, E = Young's modulus, and a = half crack length. Fracture mechanics has generalized to that γ represents energy dissipated in fracture not just the energy associated with creation of new surfaces

=== Linear elastic fracture mechanics ===
Linear elastic fracture mechanics (LEFM) builds off the energy balance approach taken by Griffith but provides a more generalized approach for many crack problems. LEFM investigates the stress field near the crack tip and bases fracture criteria on stress field parameters. One important contribution of LEFM is the stress intensity factor, K, which is used to predict the stress at the crack tip. The stress field is given by

$\sigma_{ij}(r, \theta)={K\over(2\pi r)^{1/2}}f_{ij}(\theta)$

where $K$ is the stress intensity factor for Mode I, II, or III cracking and $f_{ij}$ is a dimensionless quantity that varies with applied load and sample geometry. As the stress field gets close to the crack tip, i.e. $r\rightarrow0$, $f_{ij}$ becomes a fixed function of $\theta$. With knowledge of the geometry of the crack and applied far field stresses, it is possible to predict the crack tip stresses, displacement, and growth. Energy release rate is defined to relate K to the Griffith energy balance as previously defined. In both LEFM and energy balance approaches, the crack is assumed to be cohesionless behind the crack tip. This provides a problem for geological applications such a fault, where friction exists all over a fault. Overcoming friction absorbs some of the energy that would otherwise go to crack growth. This means that for Modes II and III crack growth, LEFM and energy balances represent local stress fractures rather than global criteria.

=== Crack formation and propagation ===
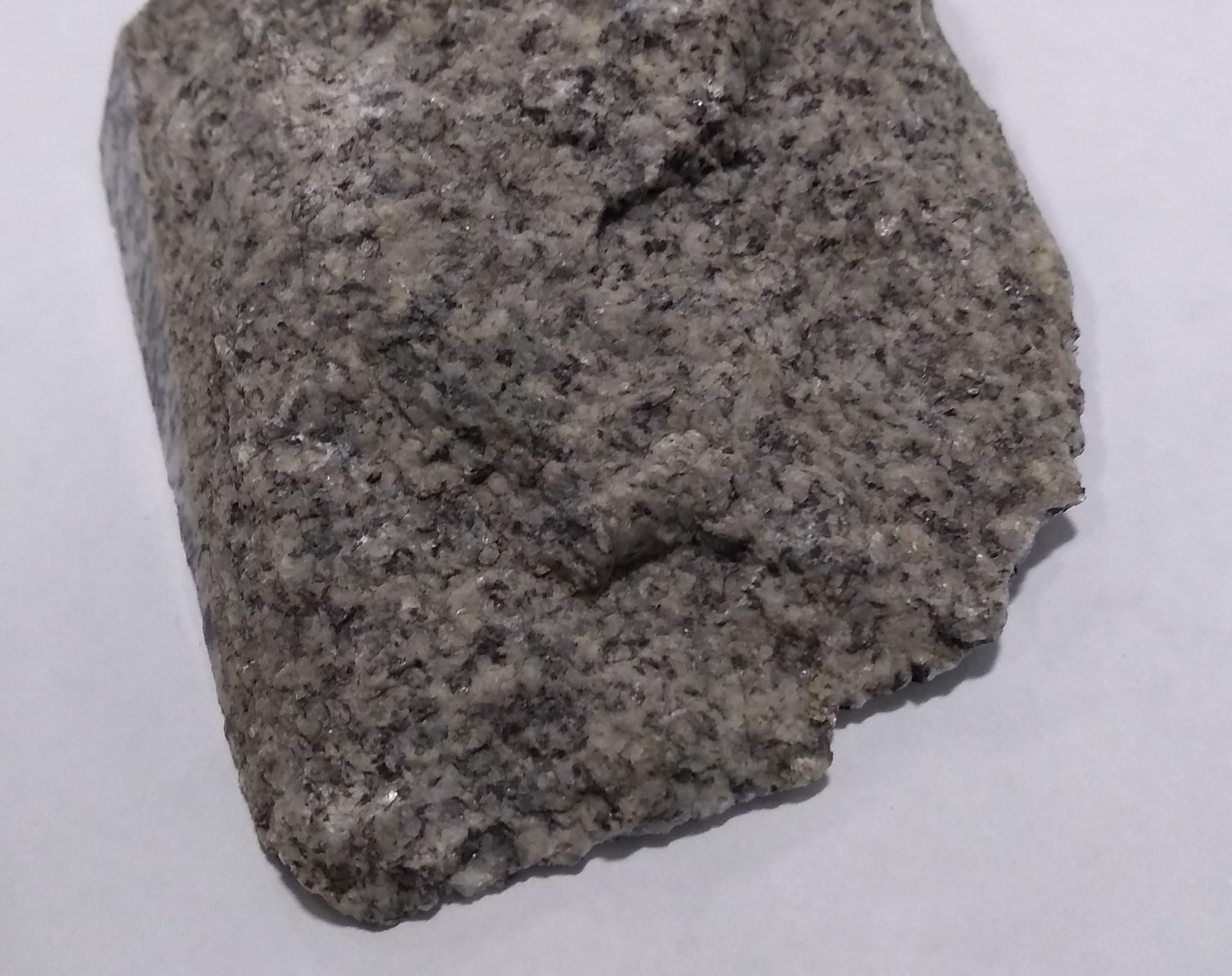
Rough surfaces on a piece of fractured granite

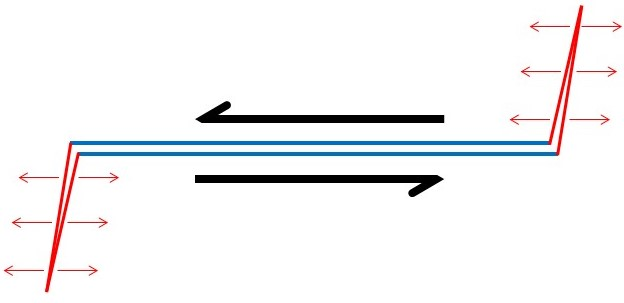
Shear fracture (blue) under shear loading (black arrows) in rock. Tensile cracks, also referred to as wing cracks (red) grow at an angle from the edges of the shear fracture allowing the shear fracture to propagate by the coalescing of these tensile fractures.

Cracks in rock do not form smooth path like a crack in a car windshield or a highly ductile crack like a ripped plastic grocery bag. Rocks are a polycrystalline material so cracks grow through the coalescing of complex microcracks that occur in front of the crack tip. This area of microcracks is called the brittle process zone. Consider a simplified 2D shear crack as shown in the image on the right. The shear crack, shown in blue, propagates when tensile cracks, shown in red, grow perpendicular to the direction of the least principal stresses. The tensile cracks propagate a short distance then become stable, allowing the shear crack to propagate. This type of crack propagation should only be considered an example. Fracture in rock is a 3D process with cracks growing in all directions. It is also important to note that once the crack grows, the microcracks in the brittle process zone are left behind leaving a weakened section of rock. This weakened section is more susceptible to changes in pore pressure and dilatation or compaction. Note that this description of formation and propagation considers temperatures and pressures near the Earth's surface. Rocks deep within the earth are subject to very high temperatures and pressures. This causes them to behave in the semi-brittle and plastic regimes which result in significantly different fracture mechanisms. In the plastic regime cracks acts like a plastic bag being torn. In this case stress at crack tips goes to two mechanisms, one which will drive propagation of the crack and the other which will blunt the crack tip. In the brittle-ductile transition zone, material will exhibit both brittle and plastic traits with the gradual onset of plasticity in the polycrystalline rock. The main form of deformation is called cataclastic flow, which will cause fractures to fail and propagate due to a mixture of brittle-frictional and plastic deformations.

=== Joint types ===
Describing joints can be difficult, especially without visuals. The following are descriptions of typical natural fracture joint geometries that might be encountered in field studies:

- Plumose Structures are fracture networks that form at a range of scales, and spread outward from a joint origin. The joint origin represents a point at which the fracture begins. The mirror zone is the joint morphology closest to the origin that results in very smooth surfaces. Mist zones exist on the fringe of mirror zones and represent the zone where the joint surface slightly roughens. Hackle zones predominate after mist zones, where the joint surface begins to get fairly rough. This hackle zone severity designates barbs, which are the curves away from the plume axis.
- Orthogonal Joints occur when the joints within the system occur at mutually perpendicular angles to each other.
- Conjugate Joints occur when the joints intersect each other at angles significantly less than ninety degrees.
- Systematic Joints are joint systems in which all the joints are parallel or subparallel, and maintain roughly the same spacing from each other.
- Columnar Joints are joints that cut the formation vertically in (typically) hexagonal columns. These tend to be a result of cooling and contraction in hypabyssal intrusions or lava flows.
- Desiccation cracks are joints that form in a layer of mud when it dries and shrinks. Like columnar joints, these tend to be hexagonal in shape.
- Sigmoidal Joints are joints that run parallel to each other, but are cut by sigmoidal (stretched S) joints in between.
- Sheeting joints are joints that often form near surface, and as a result form parallel to the surface. These can also be recognized in exfoliation joints.
- In joint systems where relatively long joints cut across the outcrop, the throughgoing joints act as master joints and the short joints that occur in between are cross joints.
- Poisson effect is the creation of vertical contraction fractures that are a result of the relief of overburden over a formation.
- Pinnate joints are joints that form immediately adjacent to and parallel to the shear face of a fault. These joints tend to merge with the faults at an angle between 35 and 45 degrees to the fault surface.
- Release joints are tensile joints that form as a change in geologic shape results in the manifestation of local or regional tension that can create Mode I tensile fractures.
- Concurrent joints that display a ladder pattern are interior regions with one set of joints that are fairly long, and the conjugate set of joints for the pattern remain relatively short, and terminate at the long joint.
- Sometimes joints can also display grid patterns, which are fracture sets that have mutually crosscutting fractures.
- An en echelon or stepped array represents a set of tensile fractures that form within a fault zone parallel to each other.

=== Faults and shear fractures ===
Faults are another form of fracture in a geologic environment. In any type of faulting, the active fracture experiences shear failure, as the faces of the fracture slip relative to each other. As a result, these fractures seem like large scale representations of Mode II and III fractures, however that is not necessarily the case. On such a large scale, once the shear failure occurs, the fracture begins to curve its propagation towards the same direction as the tensile fractures. In other words, the fault typically attempts to orient itself perpendicular to the plane of least principal stress. This results in an out-of-plane shear relative to the initial reference plane. Therefore, these cannot necessarily be qualified as Mode II or III fractures.

An additional, important characteristic of shear-mode fractures is the process by which they spawn wing cracks, which are tensile cracks that form at the propagation tip of the shear fractures. As the faces slide in opposite directions, tension is created at the tip, and a mode I fracture is created in the direction of the σ_{h-max}, which is the direction of maximum principal stress.

Shear-failure criteria is an expression that attempts to describe the stress at which a shear rupture creates a crack and separation. This criterion is based largely off of the work of Charles Coulomb, who suggested that as long as all stresses are compressive, as is the case in shear fracture, the shear stress is related to the normal stress by:

σ_{s}= C+μ(σ_{n}-σ_{f}),

where C is the cohesion of the rock, or the shear stress necessary to cause failure given the normal stress across that plane equals 0. μ is the coefficient of internal friction, which serves as a constant of proportionality within geology. σ_{n} is the normal stress across the fracture at the instant of failure, σ_{f} represents the pore fluid pressure. It is important to point out that pore fluid pressure has a significant impact on shear stress, especially where pore fluid pressure approaches lithostatic pressure, which is the normal pressure induced by the weight of the overlying rock.

This relationship serves to provide the coulomb failure envelope within the Mohr-Coulomb Theory.

Frictional sliding is one aspect for consideration during shear fracturing and faulting. The shear force parallel to the plane must overcome the frictional force to move the faces of the fracture across each other. In fracturing, frictional sliding typically only has significant effects on the reactivation on existing shear fractures. For more information on frictional forces, see friction.

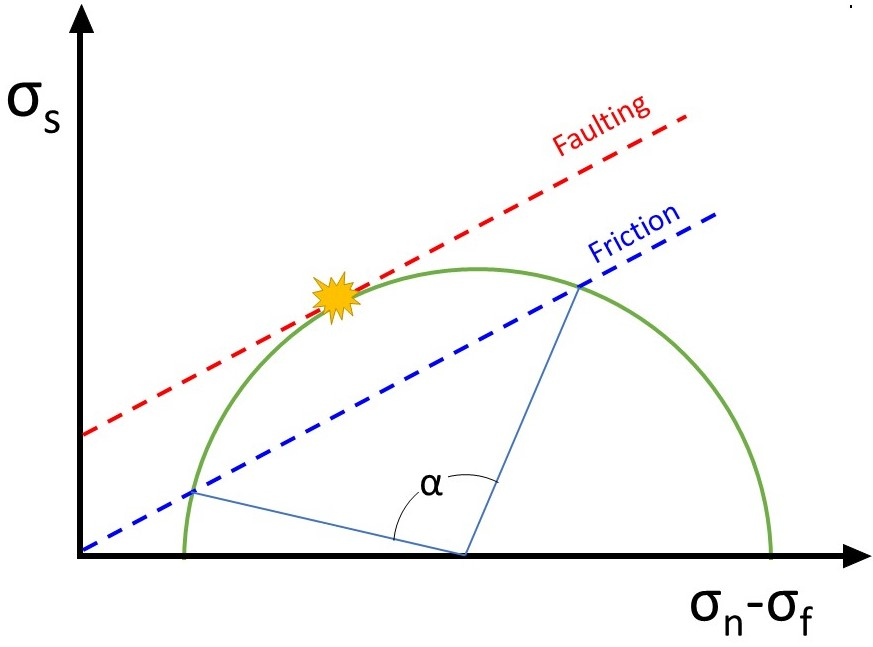
2D Mohr's diagram showing the different failure criteria for frictional sliding vs faulting. Existing cracks orientated between -α/4 and +α/4 on the Mohr's diagram will slip before a new fault is created on the surface indicated by the yellow star.

The shear force required to slip fault is less than force required to fracture and create new faults as shown by the Mohr-Coulomb diagram. Since the earth is full of existing cracks and this means for any applied stress, many of these cracks are more likely to slip and redistribute stress than a new crack is to initiate. The Mohr's Diagram shown, provides a visual example. For a given stress state in the earth, if an existing fault or crack exists orientated anywhere from −α/4 to +α/4, this fault will slip before the strength of the rock is reached and a new fault is formed. While the applied stresses may be high enough to form a new fault, existing fracture planes will slip before fracture occurs.

One important idea when evaluating the friction behavior within a fracture is the impact of asperities, which are the irregularities that stick out from the rough surfaces of fractures. Since both faces have bumps and pieces that stick out, not all of the fracture face is actually touching the other face. The cumulative impact of asperities is a reduction of the real area of contact', which is important when establishing frictional forces.

=== Subcritical crack growth ===
Sometimes, it is possible for fluids within the fracture to cause fracture propagation with a much lower pressure than initially required. The reaction between certain fluids and the minerals the rock is composed of can lower the stress required for fracture below the stress required throughout the rest of the rock. For instance, water and quartz can react to form a substitution of OH molecules for the O molecules in the quartz mineral lattice near the fracture tip. Since the OH bond is much lower than that with O, it effectively reduces the necessary tensile stress required to extend the fracture.

== Engineering considerations ==
In geotechnical engineering a fracture forms a discontinuity that may have a large influence on the mechanical behavior (strength, deformation, etc.) of soil and rock masses in, for example, tunnel, foundation, or slope construction.

Fractures also play a significant role in minerals exploitation. One aspect of the upstream energy sector is the production from naturally fractured reservoirs. There are a good number of naturally fractured reservoirs in the United States, and over the past century, they have provided a substantial boost to the nation's net hydrocarbon production.

The key concept is while low porosity, brittle rocks may have very little natural storage or flow capability, the rock is subjected to stresses that generate fractures, and these fractures can actually store a very large volume of hydrocarbons, capable of being recovered at very high rates. One of the most famous examples of a prolific naturally fractured reservoir was the Austin Chalk formation in South Texas. The chalk had very little porosity, and even less permeability. However, tectonic stresses over time created one of the most extensive fractured reservoirs in the world. By predicting the location and connectivity of fracture networks, geologists were able to plan horizontal wellbores to intersect as many fracture networks as possible. Many people credit this field for the birth of true horizontal drilling in a developmental context. Another example in South Texas is the Georgetown and Buda limestone formations.

Furthermore, the recent uprise in prevalence of unconventional reservoirs is actually, in part, a product of natural fractures. In this case, these microfractures are analogous to Griffith Cracks, however they can often be sufficient to supply the necessary productivity, especially after completions, to make what used to be marginally economic zones commercially productive with repeatable success.

However, while natural fractures can often be beneficial, they can also act as potential hazards while drilling wells. Natural fractures can have very high permeability, and as a result, any differences in hydrostatic balance down the well can result in well control issues. If a higher pressured natural fracture system is encountered, the rapid rate at which formation fluid can flow into the wellbore can cause the situation to rapidly escalate into a blowout, either at surface or in a higher subsurface formation. Conversely, if a lower pressured fracture network is encountered, fluid from the wellbore can flow very rapidly into the fractures, causing a loss of hydrostatic pressure and creating the potential for a blowout from a formation further up the hole.

== Fracture modeling ==
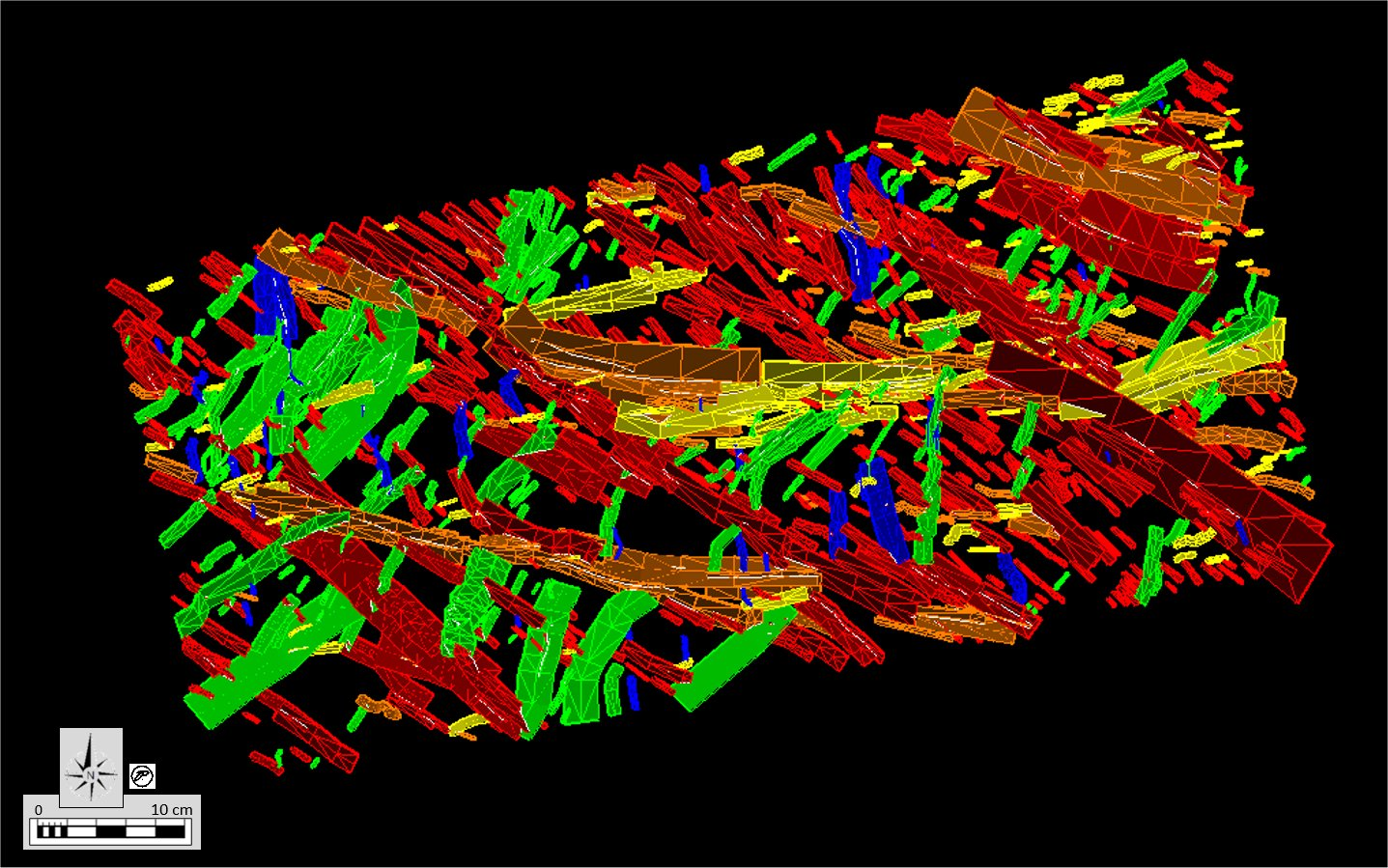
Three dimensional computer model of a fracture and fault network (DFN/DFFN), showing the different geological sets in colours, generated by the DMX Protocol using a combination of probabilistic and deterministic procedures

Since the mid-1980s, 2D and 3D computer modeling of fault and fracture networks has become common practice in Earth Sciences. This technology became known as "DFN" (discrete fracture network") modeling, later modified into "DFFN" (discrete fault and fracture network") modeling.

The technology consists of defining the statistical variation of various parameters such as size, shape, and orientation and modeling the fracture network in space in a semi-probabilistic way in two or three dimensions. Computer algorithms and speed of calculation have become sufficiently capable of capturing and simulating the complexities and geological variabilities in three dimensions, manifested in what became known as the "DMX Protocol".

== Fracture terminology ==
A list of fracture related terms:

- asperities – tiny bumps and protrusions along the faces of fractures
- axial stretching – fracture mechanism resulting from a remote applied tensile force that creates fractures perpendicular to the tensile load axis
- cataclastic flow – microscopic ductile flow resulting from small grain-scale fracturing and frictional sliding distributed across a large area.*fracture – any surface of discontinuity within a layer of rock
- dike – a fracture filled with sedimentary or igneous rock not originating in the fracture formation
- fault – (in a geologic sense) a fracture surface upon which there has been sliding
- fissure – a fracture with walls that have separated and opened significantly
- fracture front – the line separating the rock that has been fractured from the rock that has not
- fracture tip – the point at which the fracture trace terminates on the surface
- fracture trace – the line representing the intersection of the fracture plane with the surface
- Griffith cracks – preexisting microfractures and flaws in the rock
- joint – a natural fracture in the formation in which there is no measureable shear displacement
- K_{IC} – critical stress intensity factor, aka fracture toughness – the stress intensity at which tensile fracture propagation may occur
- lithostatic pressure – the weight of the overlying column of rock
- longitudinal splitting – fracture mechanism resulting from compression along an axis that creates fractures parallel to the load axis
- pore fluid pressure – the pressure exerted by the fluid within the rock pores
- shear fracture – fractures across which shear displacement has occurred
- vein – a fracture filled with minerals precipitated out of an aqueous solution
- wing cracks – tensile fractures created as a result of propagating shear fractures

== See also ==
- Crevasse
- Fracking
