= Microcracks in rock =

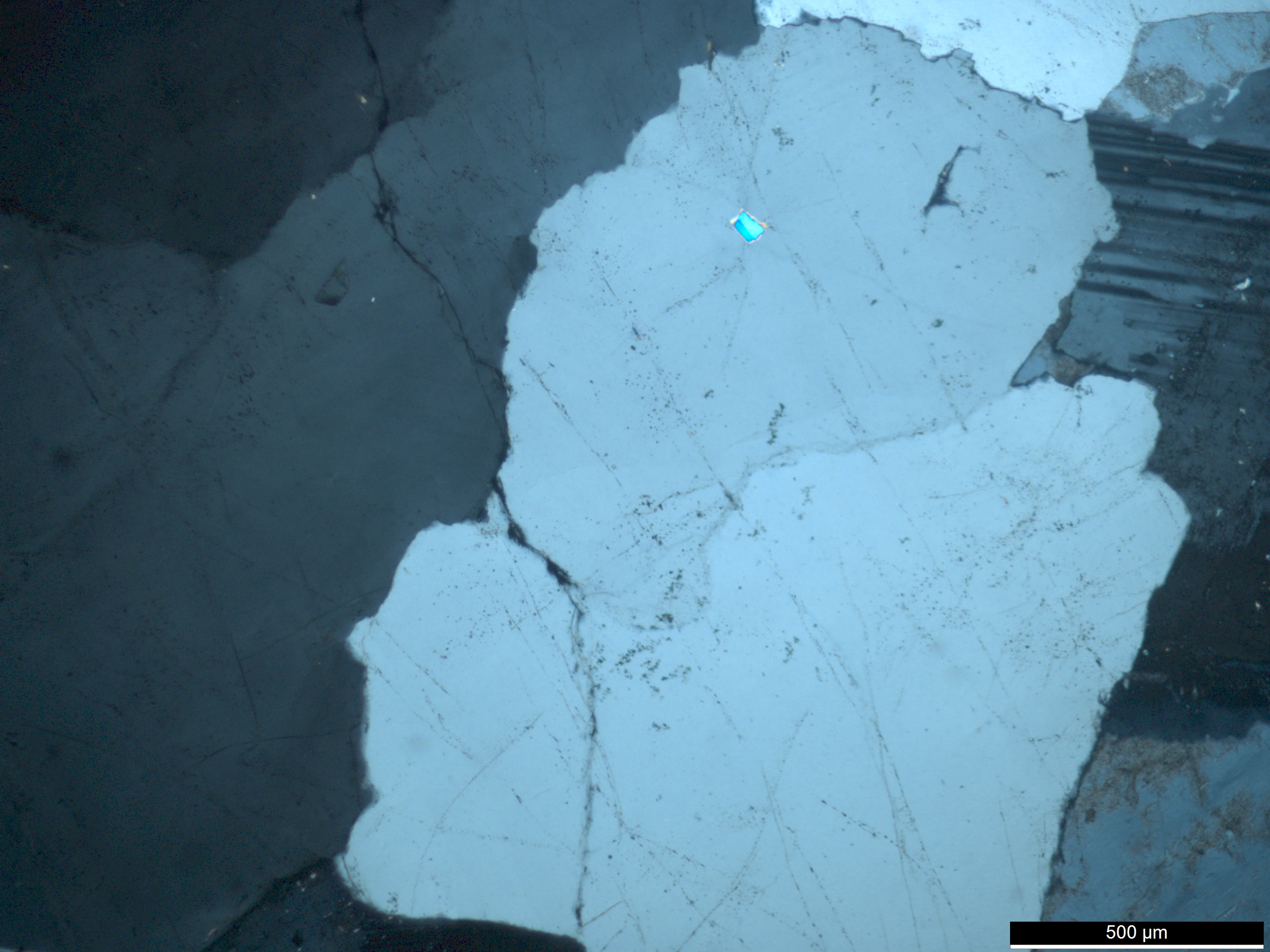
Thin section of rock showing an intragranular crack in quartz

Microcracks in rock, also known as microfractures and cracks, are spaces in rock with the longest length of 1000 μm and the other two dimensions of 10 μm. In general, the ratio of width to length of microcracks is between 10^{−3} to 10^{−5}.

Due to the scale, microcracks are observed using microscope to obtain their basic characteristics. Microcrack formation provides insights into the strength and deformation behavior of rocks. Experimental and numerical results both play an important role in studying microcracks, especially their kinematics and dynamics. Microcracks in rock have been studied to understand geologic problems such as the early stage of earthquakes and fault formation. In engineering, microcracks in rock have been linked to underground engineering problems, such as deep geological repository.

== Types ==
In general, microcracks in rock can be subdivided into four groups:

- Grain boundary cracks: microcracks are along the grain boundary.
- Intragranular cracks: microcracks are within a grain. In addition, intragranular cracks along a cleavage plane are cleavage cracks.
- Intergranular cracks: microcracks are along the boundaries of two or more grains.
- Transgranular cracks: microcracks are across the grains or are across the grains from a grain boundary. They are the most abundant in rock specimens in the experiment.
Grain-scale illustration of 4 types of microcracks

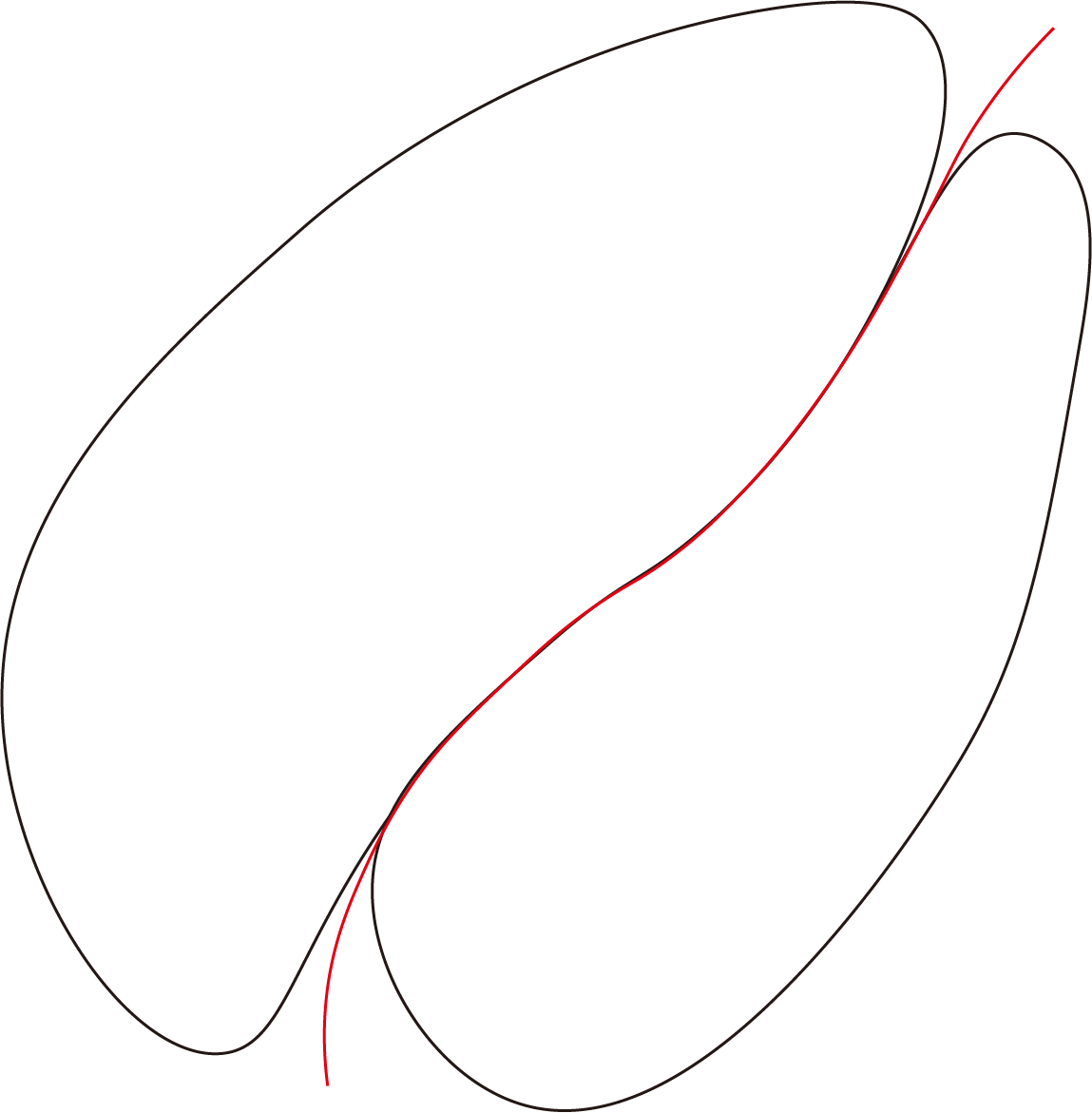
Grain boundary crack

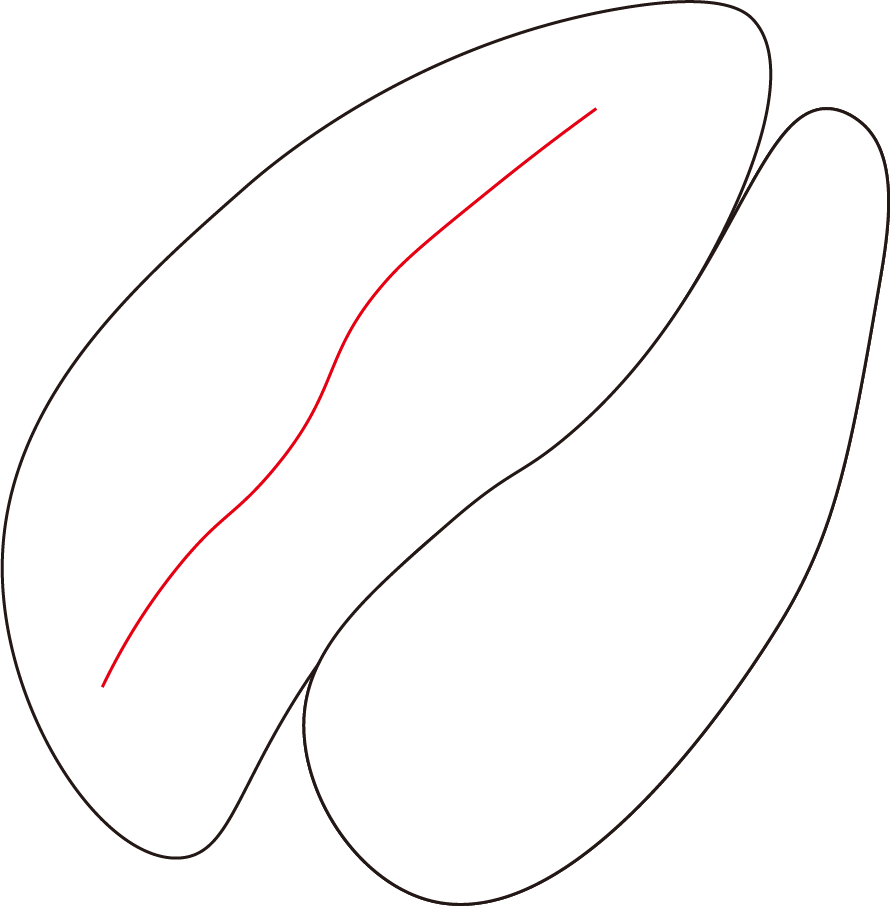
Intragranular crack

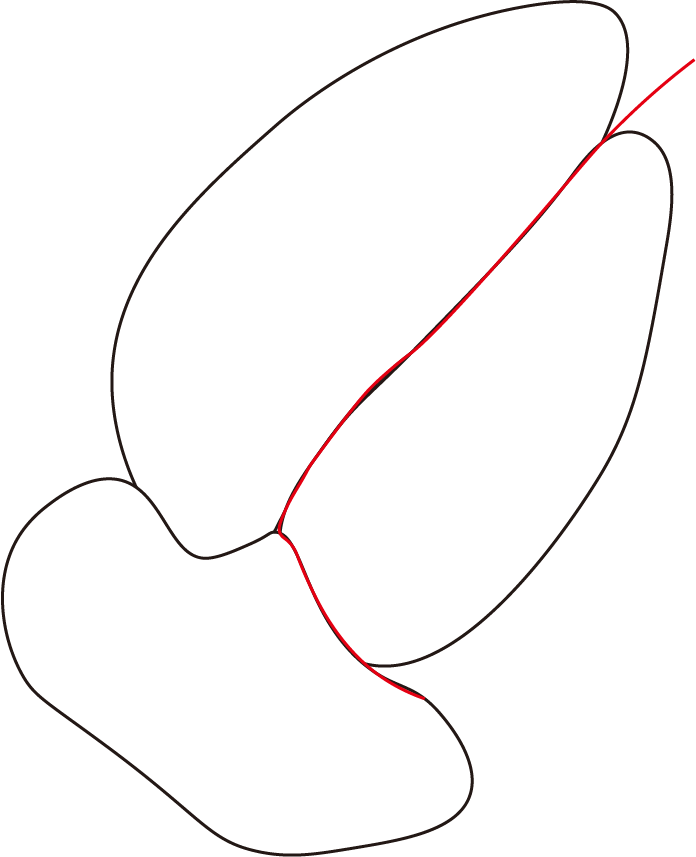
Intergranular crack

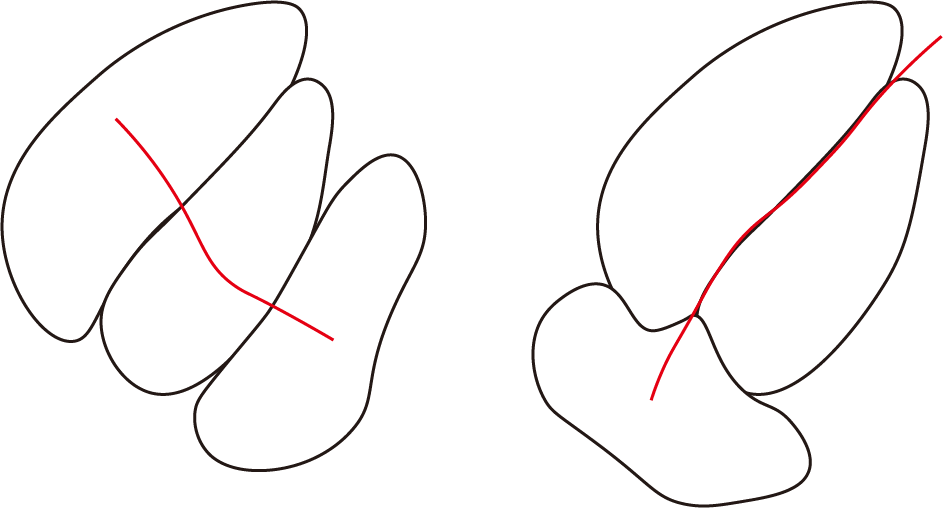
Transgranular crack

== Characteristics ==
The characteristics of microcracks are orientation, length, width, aspect ratio, number, and density. These characteristics have been tried to be explained by mathematical functions. For example, distribution of microcrack lengths away from the fault has been described by lognormal or exponential distributions.

=== Orientation ===
The orientations of microcracks are random in unstressed rock. Once a rock has been stressed, the microcracks will have a trend of orientations more or less parallel to the maximum applied stress or the fault strike. For example, the average orientation of microcracks of stressed Westerly granite is 30° to the fault strike.

=== Length, width, and aspect ratio ===
In a thin section, the observed length and width may not necessarily be the true length and width of a microcrack in three dimensions. The aspect ratio is the ratio of width to length. It is generally10^{−3} to 10^{−5}. The crack length increases with increasing maximum applied stress, resulting in a decrease in the aspect ratio.

=== Number and density ===
Density of microcracks can be either the number of microcracks per unit area or per grain or the microcrack length per unit area. Densities of microcracks near a fault are dramatically high, but they decrease rapidly within a few mineral grains away from a fault.

== Formation mechanism ==
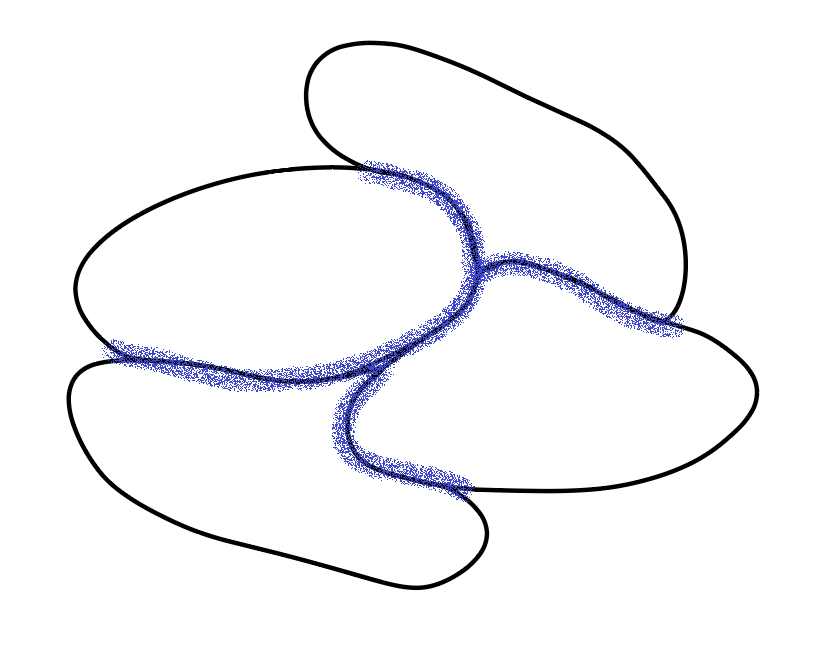
Example of mechanical microcracking in grain scale. Stress concentration colored by blue is along the grain boundaries colored by black.

Microcracks in rock can be induced by the applied stress or temperature.

=== Mechanically induced ===
A microcrack is formed when the stresses exceed the local strength of grains. The strength of materials is the ability to resist an applied load so that failure will not occur. The intrinsic properties of rock such as mineralogical heterogeneity give diverse types of mechanically induced microcracking. The following mechanisms have strong correlations to the locations that allow stress concentration in grain-scale.

- Twin induced microcracking: stresses are concentrated at twin lamella.
- Kink band and deformation lamellae associated microcracking: kink bands and deformation lamella can become a zone for stored strain energy to be concentrated.
- Cleavage separations: cleavage planes are the weaknesses in crystals. Therefore, stresses are likely to be concentrated on these weakness planes first.
- Microcracking from stress concentrations at grain boundaries: the contacts between grain boundaries provide space for stresses to be concentrated, especially tensile stresses.
- Microcracking from stress concentrations around cavities: pre-existing cracks and pores within a grain allow stress concentration. This kind of stress concentration depends on the orientation and geometry of these pre-existing microcavity, as well as the mechanical properties of the surrounding material.
- Elastic mismatches induced microcracking: each mineral type has its own elastic property. When two distinct minerals have a good contact between their boundaries, the applied stress will pull the stiffer mineral's boundary away from the contact. Therefore, the formed microcracks in the stiffer mineral are extensional cracks.
- Grain translations and rotations: in crystalline rock, sliding along grain boundaries can be induced from deviatoric stresses, resulting grain boundary cracks. In clastic rock, the grains may be rotated by neighbor grains, forming cracks in the cement or along the grain boundary.

=== Thermally induced ===
Thermally induced microcracking refers to microcrack formation due to thermal effects. Heating or cooling can cause thermal expansion or contraction between grains, respectively. Minerals with different thermo-elastic properties have different reactions to cooling or heating, resulting in microcrack formation. Also, thermal gradients at internal boundaries of grains may also allow stress concentration, thus forming microcracks.

== Evolution ==
The evolution of microcracks has been studied through experiment. When force is applied to a rock sample, microcracks initially form randomly in space. They then become more and more localized and intense with continuous loading. This phenomenon is called crack localization. A theory of failure helps to explain the evolution of microcracks with increased loading:

1. The formation of microcracks starts at pre-existing microcracks.
2. The newly formed microcracks grow in size individually.
3. The number of growing microcracks also increases.
4. The growing microcracks starts interaction as more and more cracks form and grow.
5. The growth of the microcracks suddenly becomes intense and localized, leading to macroscopic failure.

After failure, the overall microcrack density increases near the fault and decreases rapidly away from the fault. In addition, the density of transgranular cracks increases near the fault, whereas the density of grain boundary cracks is lower. Connecting locally dense crack regions, crack arrays, and grain boundary eventually forms a macrocrack.

Before forming a fault, there is a fracture process zone. It is a region of microcracks near the tip of a rock failure. It is associated with the crack localization and related to energy dissipation. The size of a fracture process zone is related to the specimen size. The larger the specimen size, the large the size of the fracture process zone. This relationship no longer exists when the specimen size is larger than a certain size.

The heterogeneity of rock makes the microcracking behavior much more complicated than other simple materials. Factors controlling microcracking behavior still have been identified and studied:

- Rock type and composition: rock types can be classified into crystalline rocks including igneous rocks and metamorphic rocks, as well as sedimentary rocks including clastic and chemical sedimentary rocks. For example, many studies show that quartz content of a rock has a great impact on the number of microcracks.
- Pre-existing weaknesses: they are already in rock, for example, cleavage planes of minerals, pores, and cracks.
- Stress state: the state of a rock experiencing the stresses.

== Recovery ==
In addition to microcracks formation, microcracks in rock can be recovered either by microcrack closure or microcrack healing. Microcrack recovery will directly cause a decrease in permeability of rock.

=== Microcrack closure ===
It can be either caused by increase in the applied stress or decrease in the effective stress. For example, microcracks perpendicular to the maximum stress direction will close. However, in nature, parts of a microcrack can be in different directions. For this reason, it will result in incomplete closure that some parts of the microcrack are closed while some parts are still open.

=== Microcrack healing ===
It is driven by transportation of chemical fluid in microcracks. For example, healing of microcracks in quartz is activated by temperature. Healing in quartz becomes fast when the temperature is above 400 °C. The rate of healing also depends on the crack sizes. The smaller the cracks, the faster the healing.

== Influence ==
Microcracks affect the properties of rock including stiffness, strength, elastic modulus, permeability, fracture toughness, and elastic wave velocity.

== Methodology to study microcracks ==
Studies of microcracks are focused on their distributions of the characteristics and microcracking behavior. Many experiments to study microcracks in rock have been conducted in the past decades, whereas numerical study also has been widely used to study microcracks in recent years because of the technology development. These studies have been used to compare with natural conditions.

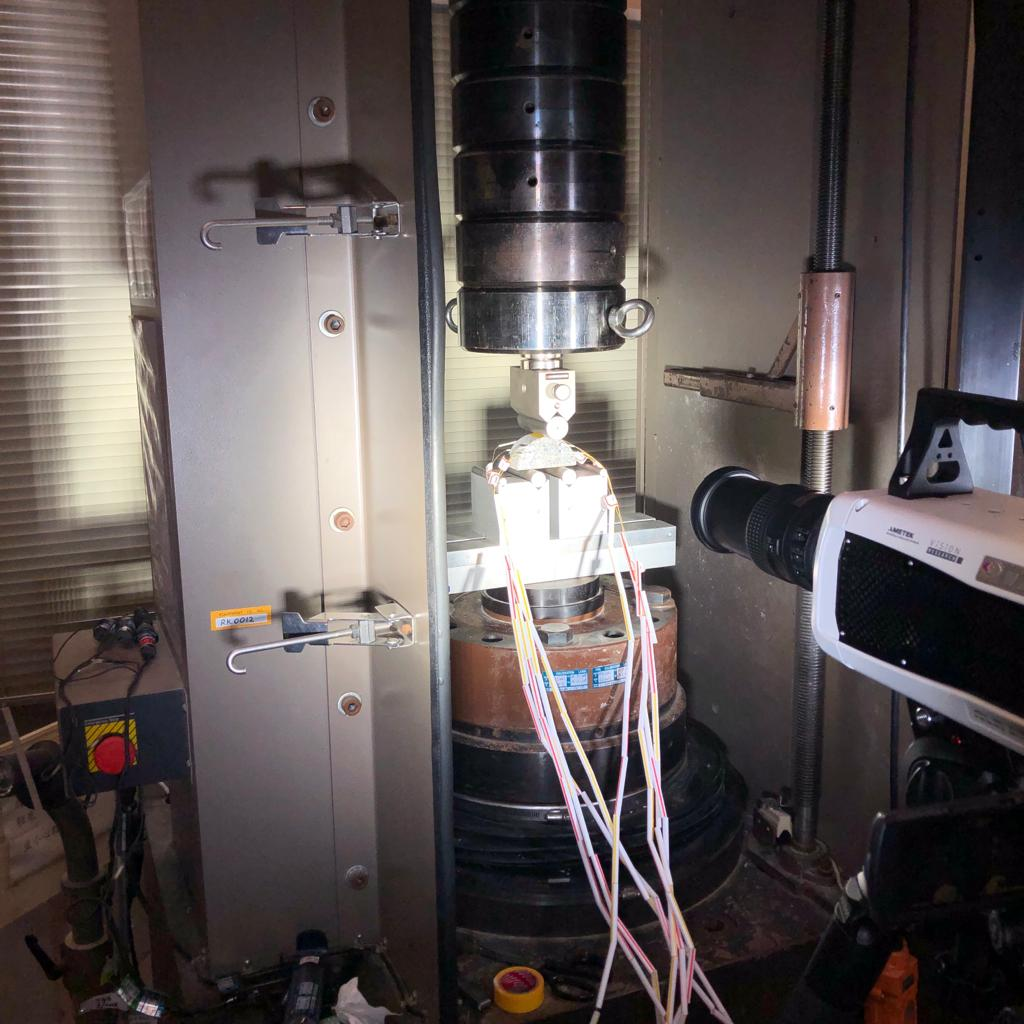
Semi-circular-bend granite under the applied loading in laboratory.

=== Experimental study ===
Experimental study is to analyze the rock specimens that have been subjected to applied stress in laboratory. There are two popular methods to study microcracks. Observation of thin section using microscope is to obtain the distributions of microcrack lengths, widths and aspect ratios, numbers and densities, as well as orientations. Another method is using acoustic emission to detect and monitor microcrack growth. Experimental results can help scientists develop numerical models, such as simulation of fracture pattern growth.

Many experiments on rock fracture mechanism have been done in laboratory, but these experiments may have different requirement of specimen configuration and loading scheme. They are the two important factors controlling microcracking behavior such as microcrack development.

==== Specimen configuration ====
Specimen configuration refers to the dimensions of a specimen and its man-made crack. Rock samples are usually obtained from rock cores. Therefore, cylinder shape, chevron-bend shape, and semi-circular-bend shape (SCB) are the common specimen shapes used in experimental study. For example, a semi-circular bend specimen has a man-made crack, called a notch. It is used to control the morphology of rock fracture. Two notch types can be induced: a straight-through notch or a chevron notch. A straight-through notch semi-circular-bend (SNCCB) specimen has a flat-ended notch, whereas a chevron notch semi-circular-bend (CNSCB) specimen has a V-shaped opening to the air.

==== Loading scheme ====
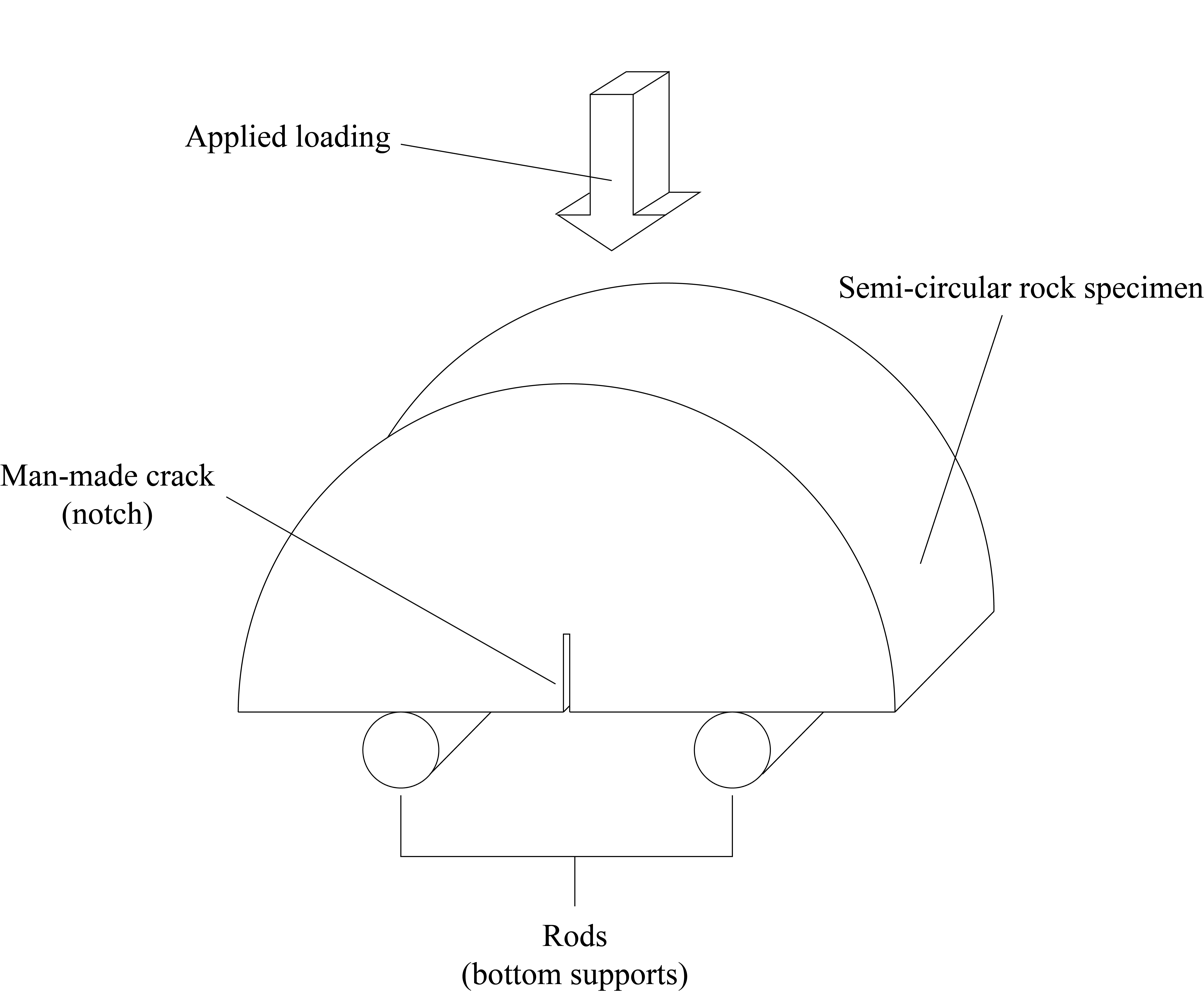
Example of the mode I loading schemes

In fracture mechanics, there are three types of loading modes to make a crack able to propagate. They are mode I (opening), mode II (in-plane shear), and mode III (out-plane shear). These loading modes can be achieved by the designed loading scheme. Mode I fractures are the most common microcracks in rock in natural.

==== Acoustic emission ====
An acoustic emission (AE) is a high-frequency elastic wave. It is generated from microcrack formations, and is correlated to rapid microcrack growth. Acoustic emission sensors are attached to the surface of the specimen. They collect the signals generated during microcrack formation. The data can be used to describe the microcrack behavior. Noted that one detected acoustic emission event is not necessary to be one microcrack formation.

The types of data collected from acoustic emission sensors are:

- Acoustic emission count and acoustic emission count rate: the acoustic emission count is the number of acoustic emission events detected, whereas the acoustic emission count rate is the acoustic emission count per unit time.
- Acoustic emission waveform: an acoustic emission waveform includes the delay time, threshold level, triggered time, duration time, and maximum amplitude.

These two types of data imply the following information:

- Event counting: acoustic emission counting events over time can be compared with measured quantity, such as stress and strain.
- Source location: the source location of an acoustic emission event can be obtained from multiple measurement of waveforms of the same acoustic emission event.
- Energy release and the Gutenberg-Richter relation: it is used to describe a relationship between magnitudes of earthquakes and their numbers, but it is also representative of the acoustic emission energy if more sensors have been used.
- Source mechanism: if the polarity of the initial P wave motion has been recorded at several sensors, source mechanism can be analyzed from a fault plane solution .

==== Limitation ====
- Observation of microcracks under microscope: microcracks sometimes are difficult to be distinguished. For example, it is difficult to distinguish intergranular cracks from intragranular cracks. It is also difficult to tell whether it is single transgranular crack or a multi-intragranular cracks that are connected. Also, the length of an intergranular crack may include the lengths of grain boundary cracks. The lengths and widths of microcracks are recorded from a two dimensional perspective. It may not totally reflect their true dimensions.
- Variations of experimental results from different specimen configuration and loading scheme: there are several specimen configurations and loading schemes. Using different configuration and loading scheme, fracture properties of the same rock including microcrack behavior can be various. The most suitable specimen configuration and loading scheme are still on debate.

=== Numerical study ===
Numerical study is used to help understanding the complicated rock mechanics problems. Four types of models using in modelling microcracks in rock are particle-based models, block-based models, grain-based models, and node-based models. Since grain-based models can consider all types of microcrack, they are good at understanding microcracking behavior.

== Geological implication ==
Experimental study of microcracks provides insights into faulting and microcracks formation in nature. Microcracks studies with CL and fluid-inclusion studies are able to reconstruct the growth of fractures from microcracks. Population of microcracks is useful to distinguish whether the detachment is due to landslide or tectonic in origin. The fracture process zone can be used to understand the permeability of fault zones which controls fluid flow. Therefore, microcracks can be useful for assessing the stress history or fluid movement history of rock. Acoustic emission from microcrack growth may help to understand earthquakes.

== Implications of underground engineering problems ==
Microcracks can affect the thermal and transport properties of rock. Studies of microcracks in rock provide an important insights into underground engineering problems as follows used in actual practice in the design, operation, and organization of nondestructive testing and monitoring of industrial mining facilities that include these interfaces

=== Deep geological repository ===
A deep geological repository is an underground repository for radioactive waste disposal, such as nuclear fuel. It is at depth of hundred metres in a stable rock mass. Deep geological repositories are all over the world, such as the United States (WIPP) and Finland (Olkiluoto Nuclear Power Plant).

=== Geothermal reservoir ===
A geothermal reservoir is one of the three components of a geothermal system that acts an energy source. It is a porous and permeable rock mass so that convection of trapped hot water and steam and recharge of heat supply can occur. The ideal geothermal reservoir is a highly permeable, fractured rock matrix.

=== Hydrocarbon reservoir ===
A hydrocarbon reservoir is an underground reservoir that keeps hydrocarbons trapped inside. Reservoir rocks have high porosity and permeability while the surrounding rocks that act as barriers have low permeability. Therefore, hydrocarbons that exist as liquid and/or gas can only stay in the reservoir rocks.

=== Underground storage of CO_{2} ===
Underground storage of CO_{2} is a solution to remove CO_{2} in the atmosphere. It is composed of porous rocks surrounded by nonporous rocks so that it can trap the CO_{2} for a long time. A depleted oil and gas reservoir that is out of energy source is one of the examples used for underground storage.

== See also ==
- Fracture (geology)
- Fracture mechanics
- Acoustic emission
