= Volcanism of the Mount Edziza volcanic complex =

- Bimodal volcanism
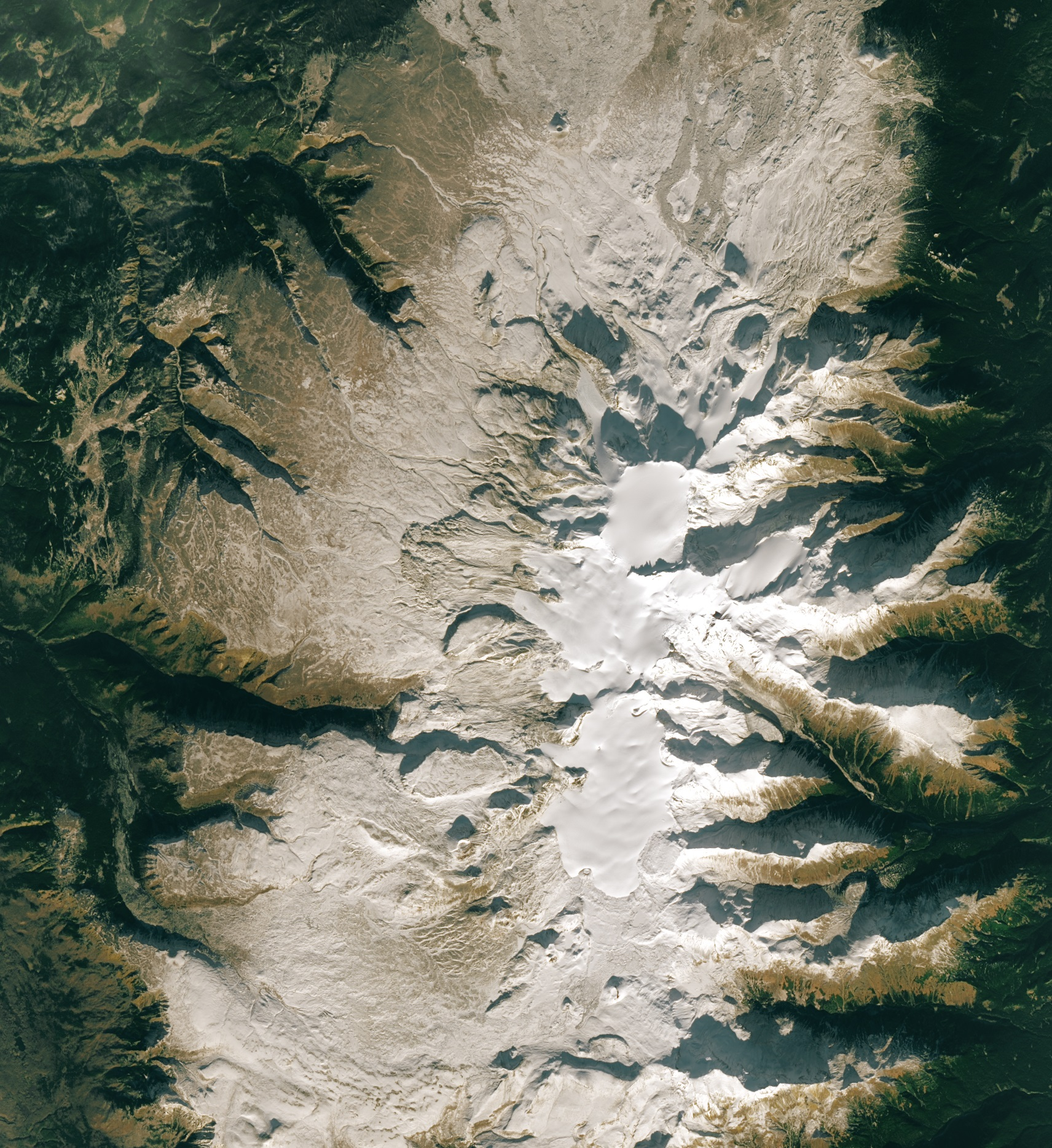
- The Big Raven Plateau at the northern end of the Mount Edziza volcanic complex consists of several lava flows that have issued from multiple volcanoes in the last 7.5 million years

- Location of the Mount Edziza volcanic complex in British Columbia
- Coordinates: 57°30′N 130°36′W
- Location: British Columbia, Canada
- Range: Tahltan Highland
- Duration: At least 7.4 million years ago to less than 2,000 years ago
- Created: Raspberry Formation (first cycle), Little Iskut Formation (first cycle), Armadillo Formation (first cycle), Nido Formation (second cycle), Spectrum Formation (second cycle); Pyramid Formation (second cycle), Ice Peak Formation (third cycle), Pillow Ridge Formation (third cycle), Edziza Formation (third cycle), Arctic Lake Formation (fourth cycle), Klastline Formation (fourth cycle), Kakiddi Formation (fourth cycle), Big Raven Formation (fifth cycle)
- Products: Alkali basalt, hawaiite, trachybasalt, tristanite, mugearite, benmoreite, trachyte, comendite, pantellerite

The Mount Edziza volcanic complex (MEVC) in British Columbia, Canada, has a history of volcanism that spans more than seven million years. It has taken place during five cycles of magmatic activity, each producing less volcanic material than the previous one. Volcanism during these cycles has created several types of volcanoes, including cinder cones, stratovolcanoes, subglacial volcanoes, shield volcanoes and lava domes. The roughly 1,000 km^{2} (400 mi^{2}) volcanic plateau forming the base of the MEVC originated from the successive eruptions of highly mobile lava flows. Volcanic rocks such as basalt, trachybasalt, benmoreite, tristanite, mugearite, trachyte and rhyolite were deposited by multiple eruptions of the MEVC; the latter six rock types are products of varying degrees of magmatic differentiation in underground magma reservoirs. Renewed effusive volcanism could block local streams with lava flows whereas renewed explosive volcanism could disrupt air traffic with volcanic ash across parts of northwestern Canada. At least 10 distinct flows of obsidian were produced by volcanism of the MEVC, some of which were exploited by indigenous peoples in prehistoric times to make tools and weaponry.

The first magmatic cycle took place between 7.5 and six million years ago and is represented by the Raspberry, Little Iskut and Armadillo formations, each of which is the product of a different eruptive period. Three distinct periods of eruptive activity also characterized the second magmatic cycle between six and one million years ago; they are represented by the Nido, Spectrum and Pyramid geological formations. The third magmatic cycle about one million years ago is represented by the Ice Peak, Pillow Ridge and Edziza geological formations, each of which is also the product of a distinct eruptive period. Three distinct periods of eruptive activity also characterized the fourth magmatic cycle between 0.8 and 0.2 million years ago which are represented by the Arctic Lake, Klastline and Kakiddi geological formations. The fifth magmatic cycle began at least 20,000 years ago and may be ongoing; the single distinct eruptive period of this magmatic cycle is represented by the Big Raven Formation.

== Background ==
The Mount Edziza volcanic complex is a linear group of volcanoes in northwestern British Columbia, Canada. It is about 65 km (40 mi) long and 20 km (12 mi) wide, consisting of several stratovolcanoes, shield volcanoes, subglacial volcanoes, lava domes and cinder cones. This volcanic complex includes a broad, steep-sided, intermontane plateau that rises from a base elevation of 760 or 816 metres (2,500 or 2,675 feet). A northerly-trending, elliptical, shield volcano consisting of multiple flat-lying lava flows forms the plateau which is capped with several smaller volcanic structures of the complex. Four central volcanoes of felsic (Note: Felsic pertains to magmatic rocks that are enriched with silicon, oxygen, aluminum, sodium and potassium.) composition overlie the plateau, the highest of which is Mount Edziza with an elevation of 2,786 m (9,140 ft). The plateau is subdivided into three smaller plateaus; from north to south they are the Big Raven, Kitsu and Arctic Lake plateaus.

The MEVC is one of the largest volcanic complexes in North America, covering about 1,000 km^{2} (390 mi^{2}) and comprising about 665 cubic kilometres (160 cubic miles) of volcanic material. After Level Mountain, the MEVC is the largest eruptive centre in the Northern Cordilleran Volcanic Province which extends from northwestern British Columbia northwards through Yukon into easternmost Alaska. This volcanic province is the most volcanically active area in Canada, having undergone at least three eruptions in the last 500 years. Volcanism of the Northern Cordilleran Volcanic Province began 20 million years ago, resulting from rifting of the North American Cordillera driven by changes in relative plate motion between the North American and Pacific plates.

== Eruption rate and composition ==
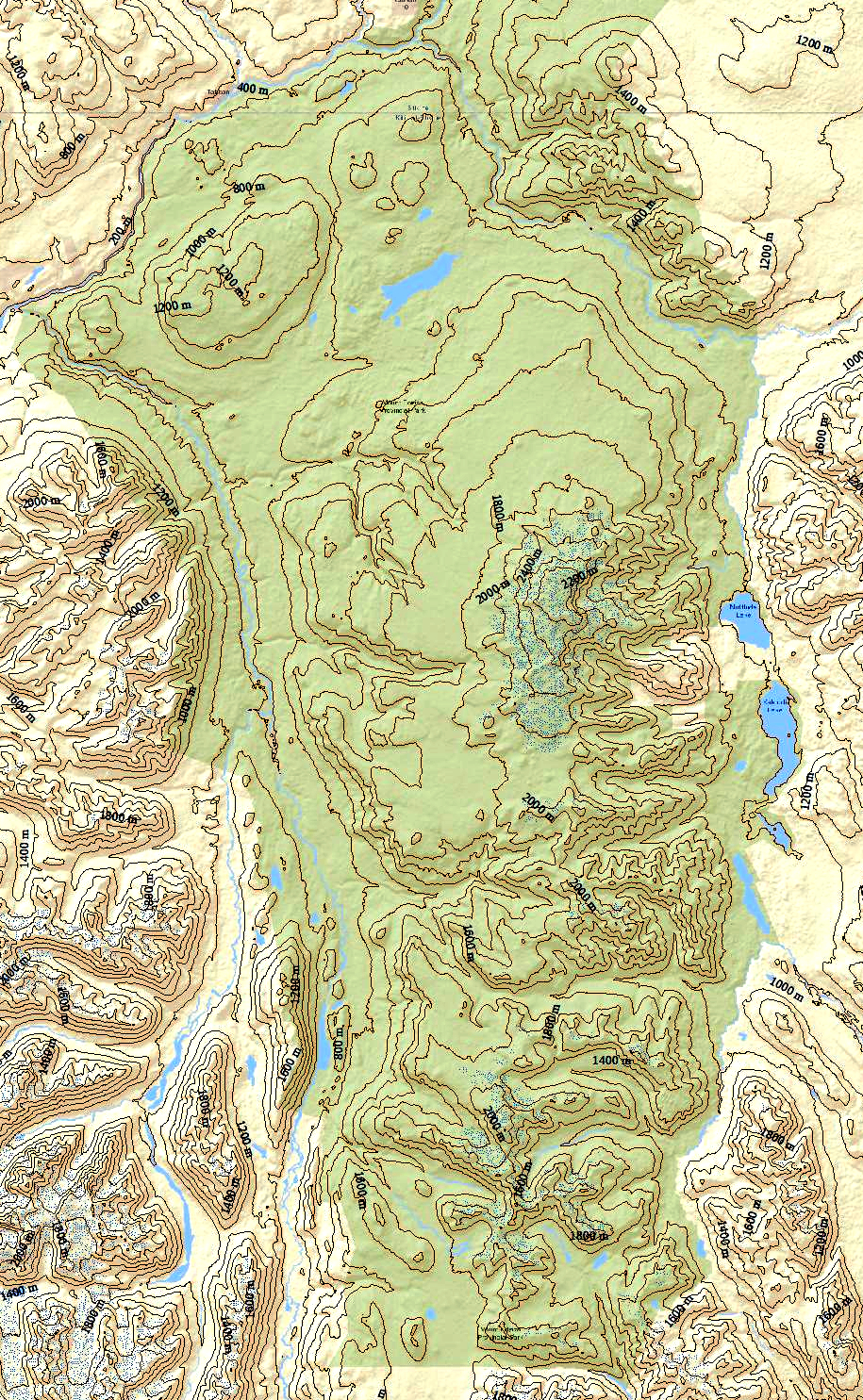
Topographic map of the MEVC with Mount Edziza Provincial Park in green

The eruption rate of the MEVC has varied throughout its long volcanic history. When the volcanic complex started erupting at least 7.4 million years ago, it increased the rate of magmatism in the Northern Cordilleran Volcanic Province from 100,000 to 300,000 cubic metres (3,500,000 to 10,600,000 cubic feet) per year. A period of quiescence appears to have followed at the MEVC and elsewhere in the Northern Cordilleran Volcanic Province between about four and three million years ago. Magmatism of the Northern Cordilleran Volcanic Province has since rebounded to a relatively constant rate of 100,000 cubic metres (3,500,000 cubic feet) per year, significantly less than that estimated for the Cascade Volcanic Arc of western North America. The MEVC has undergone an eruption roughly every 379 years throughout the current Holocene epoch based on the number of demonstrable Holocene eruptions in the last 11,000 years, of which there are at least 29. This makes the MEVC the most active eruptive centre in Canada throughout the Holocene; its relatively frequent eruptions also make it one of the most hazardous volcanic complexes in Canada.

The most voluminous rocks produced by volcanism of the MEVC are mafic (Note: Mafic pertains to magmatic rocks that are relatively rich in iron and magnesium, relative to silicium.) alkali basalts and hawaiites which represent about 60% of the total eruptive volume. Felsic peralkaline rocks (Note: Peralkaline rocks are magmatic rocks that have a higher ratio of sodium and potassium to aluminum.) such as trachyte, comendite and pantellerite were also produced by volcanism of the MEVC and represent about 40% of the total eruptive volume, resulting from prolonged fractional crystallization (Note: Fractional crystallization is the process by which magma cools and separates into various minerals.) of mantle-derived basaltic magma in magma chambers. Peralkaline volcanism with similar chemistry, mineralogy and isotopic composition has also occurred at the Rainbow Range in central British Columbia, as well as at the Afar Triangle in East Africa and in the Great Basin of western North America. Volcanic rocks of intermediate composition such as benmoreite, trachybasalt, mugearite and tristanite were produced in relatively small volumes; they were the result of alkali basaltic magma having pooled in large subterranean magma chambers on a shorter timespan. The chemistry and petrography of MEVC rocks is indicative of bimodal volcanism, a phenomenon associated with continental rifting.

== Magmatic cycles ==
Volcanism of the MEVC has taken place during five cycles of magmatic activity in the last eight million years, each of which began with the effusion of alkali basalt and culminated with the eruption of felsic magma. Each cycle was less productive than the previous one, the first magmatic cycle depositing about 290 cubic kilometres (70 cubic miles) of volcanic material. Eruptions during the second and third magmatic cycles deposited about 255 cubic kilometres (61 cubic miles) and 97 cubic kilometres (23 cubic miles) of volcanic material, respectively. Volcanism during the fourth magmatic cycle deposited roughly 15 cubic kilometres (3.6 cubic miles) of volcanic material whereas the fifth cycle has produced an insignificant volume of volcanic material. The fourth and fifth magmatic cycles could possibly be part of a larger cycle that may be ongoing.

=== First magmatic cycle ===
The first magmatic cycle was restricted to the Late Miocene between 7.5 and six million years ago. Three distinct eruptive periods occurred during this magmatic cycle, each producing different types of volcanic rocks. The first eruptive period is represented by alkali basalt and hawaiite flows of the Raspberry Formation. They rest directly on older rocks of the Stikinia terrane and are exposed along the Mess Creek Escarpment. The Little Iskut Formation represents the second period of eruptive activity, consisting mainly of trachybasalt flows and breccia that overlie the Raspberry Formation. Eruptions of the Little Iskut period immediately followed or may have been coeval with those during Raspberry time due to the lack of an erosion surface between the two formations. The third eruptive period is represented by alkali basalt, comendite and trachyte of the Armadillo Formation which overlies the Little Iskut Formation.

==== Raspberry eruptive period ====
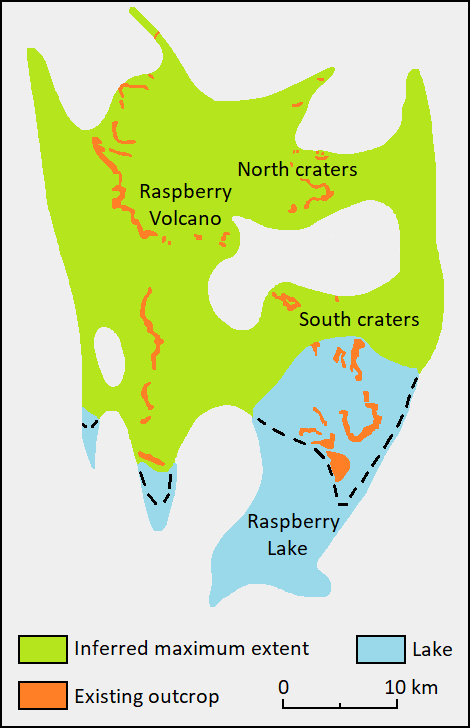
Paleogeological map of the Raspberry Formation at the end of the Raspberry eruptive period

The Raspberry eruptive period 7.4 million years ago began with the effusion of basaltic lava flows on an erosion surface from near Raspberry Pass. More than 83 cubic kilometres (20 cubic miles) of lava flows were extruded in rapid succession, forming a Late Miocene shield volcano. They reached a maximum thickness of more than 300 m (980 ft) near their source to only a few metres thick at their terminus. Disruption of the local drainage system by lava flows originating from a cluster of small satellitic cones southeast of the Raspberry shield volcano resulted in the formation of so-named Raspberry Lake in the upper Little Iskut River valley. At least 25 lava flows were extruded during Raspberry time, each reaching thicknesses of 1 to 30 m (3.3 to 98.4 ft). By the time the Raspberry eruptive period had come to an end, the Raspberry shield volcano covered an area of at least 775 km^{2} (299 mi^{2}) and reached an elevation of nearly 2,100 m (6,900 ft). Volcanism during Raspberry time did not have long periods of quiescence as suggested by the lack of fluvial layers between individual Raspberry lava flows.

About 119 cubic kilometres (29 cubic miles) of volcanic material were deposited by the Raspberry eruptions, making the Raspberry Formation the second most voluminous geological formation of the first magmatic cycle. After the Raspberry eruptive period ceased, Raspberry Lake had already begun to erode a notch along the eastern edge of the lava dam. The Raspberry shield volcano and associated satellitic cones and ash beds had also begun to erode away, but the valleys and lowlands remained filled with thick piles of basaltic lava flows which later were overlain by the much younger Mount Edziza and Spectrum Range volcanoes. In addition to forming the base of the Mess Creek Escarpment, Raspberry basalt is also exposed along the bases of Artifact and Obsidian ridges, as well as south and southeast of Mount Edziza.

Potassium–argon dating of volcanic rocks produced during this eruptive period has yielded a wide variety of ages. This includes 11.4 ± 1.5 million years, 8.4 ± 0.4 million years and 6.4 ± 0.3 million years for Raspberry hawaiite and 6.1 ± 0.4 million years and 5.5 ± 0.1 million years for Raspberry alkali basalt, the first of which is anomalously old and has the largest error. Relatively large atmospheric contents and pervasive carbonate alteration in Raspberry rocks is likely the cause of the large spread in ages. A minimum age for the timing of Raspberry volcanism is 7.4–6.2 million years.

==== Little Iskut eruptive period ====
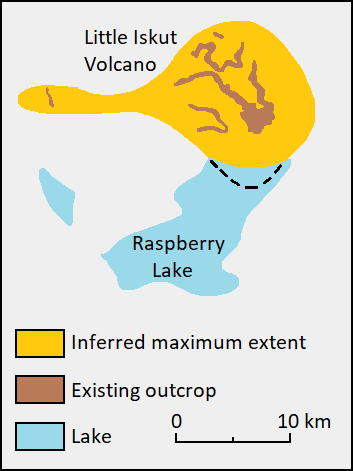
Paleogeological map of the Little Iskut Formation at the end of the Little Iskut eruptive period

The Little Iskut eruptive period 7.2 million years ago began beneath the waters of Raspberry Lake south of present day Raspberry Pass. Interactions between the lake water and the erupting magma resulted in several violent phreatic explosions, the larger explosions depositing ash and granular particles over much of the lake bed. The phreatic explosions were followed by the eruption of trachybasalt flows which began forming a lava dome on the bed of Raspberry Lake; this lava dome eventually grew above lake level from continued volcanic eruptions to form a small volcanic island. Renewed volcanism then transformed this small island into a broad shield volcano that overlapped with the northern shoreline of Raspberry Lake. By this time much of the original lake had been displaced with shattered rock fragments formed by the quenching and fracturing of lava from thermal shock. Subsequent eruptions of the Little Iskut shield volcano produced thick, irregular, randomly jointed lava flows that travelled down its gentle eastern, southern and western flanks. Lava flowing down the eastern and southern flanks entered the shrinking remnants of Raspberry Lake whereas lava travelling down the western flank merged with the older Raspberry shield volcano.

The Little Iskut eruptions were much less voluminous than those of the Raspberry eruptive period, depositing only 14.6 cubic kilometres (3.5 cubic miles) of volcanic material; this makes the Little Iskut Formation the least voluminous geological formation of the first magmatic cycle. Erosional remnants of trachybasalt flows from the Little Iskut eruptive period are exposed in a 10 km (6.2 mi) wide area northeast of the Spectrum Range where they comprise parts of Artifact Ridge and Obsidian Ridge. These flows range in thickness from about 300 m (980 ft) near the centre of Artifact Ridge to 90 m (300 ft) around the perimeter, suggesting that their source was located near Artifact Ridge. This is supported by the existence of dikes (Note: A dike is a sheet-shaped intrusion of magma into pre-existing rock.) along the northern side of Artifact Creek valley which may have been feeders for the overlying trachybasalt flows. A single potassium–argon date of 7.2 ± 0.3 million years has been obtained from Little Iskut trachybasalt.

==== Armadillo eruptive period ====
The next eruptive period, the Armadillo period, occurred between seven and six million years ago. It began with explosive activity from a vent at Cartoona Ridge which produced 10 km (6.2 mi) long ash flows and an air-fall pumice deposit that covers an area of several hundred square kilometres. This was followed by the effusion of viscous trachyte and rhyolite lava which piled up around the vent area to produce steep-sided, overlapping domes. As the lava domes continued to grow their slopes became oversteepened, forcing lava to move further away from the vent area. Eventually bulbous mounds of trachyte and rhyolite covered much of the southeastern highlands of the MEVC; these domes were subsequently eroded to form clastic (Note: Clastic pertains to clasts which are grains or fragments of rock broken off other rocks by physical weathering.) deposits.

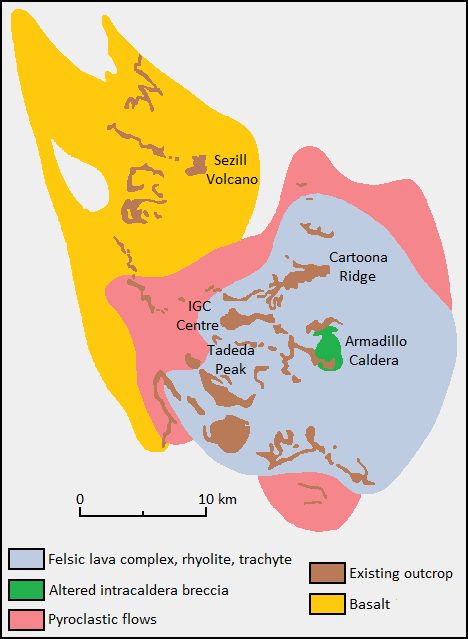
Paleogeological map showing the inferred maximum extent of the Armadillo Formation at the end of Armadillo time

Rapid evacuation of a shallow magma chamber nearly 8 km (5.0 mi) south of Cartoona Ridge resulted in the formation of the 3 km (1.9 mi) wide Armadillo Caldera. Fractures in the roof of the magma chamber provided passageways for trachyte magma to reach the subsiding caldera floor, resulting in the formation of lava lakes inside the newly-formed depression. Larger volumes of lava eventually spilled over the caldera rim to produce a nearly 13 km (8.1 mi) long, 460 m (1,510 ft) thick sequence of trachyte and rhyolite flows which extends to the west. A 180 m (590 ft) thick remnant of trachyte flows that pooled inside the caldera forms the 2,194 m (7,198 ft) high summit of Armadillo Peak which lies within its southern limit. Erosion in the middle of the caldera has exposed several granite intrusions that are in the form of sills, dikes and irregular subvolcanic masses.

Other volcanic centres were active during the Armadillo eruptive period. Tadeda Peak and the IGC Centre, both satellitic vents of the Armadillo Peak caldera, produced trachyte and rhyolite. Alkali basalt, hawaiite and trachybasalt flows erupted from Sezill Volcano and the Little Iskut shield volcano, many of which are exposed along the Mess Creek Escarpment. The thickest sections of Armadillo basalt flows are exposed in Sezill Creek canyon, Kadeya Creek canyon and near the southwestern end of Raspberry Pass where they reach thicknesses of up to 180 m (590 ft). Individual flows of alkali basalt are thin and voluminous, suggesting that they were highly fluid at the time of their eruption.

The Armadillo eruptions deposited 159 cubic kilometres (38 cubic miles) of volcanic material, making the Armadillo Formation the most voluminous geological formation of the first magmatic cycle. An anomalously old potassium–argon date of 10.2 ± 1.4 million years has been obtained from Armadillo comendite. Potassium–argon dates more in line with the volcanic stratigraphy include 6.9 ± 0.3 million years and 6.1 ± 0.1 million years from comenditic ash flows, 6.9 ± 0.3 million years from comenditic glass and 6.5 ± 0.2 million years, 6.3 ± 0.5 million years, 6.2 ± 0.1 million years and 6.1 ± 0.2 million years from hawaiite.

=== Second magmatic cycle ===
The second magmatic cycle took place between six and one million years ago during the Pliocene and Early Pleistocene. Like the first magmatic cycle, it is subdivided into three distinct eruptive periods. The first eruptive period is represented by alkali basalt and hawaiite flows of the Nido Formation. They are exposed along the Mess Creek Escarpment and appear to have originated from several separate eruptive centres along the eastern margin of the MEVC. The Spectrum Formation represents the second period of eruptive activity; it is almost entirely underlain by the Nido Formation and consists mostly of trachyte and rhyolite. The third eruptive period is represented by trachyte, comendite and pantellerite of the Pyramid Formation which overlies the Nido Formation.

==== Nido eruptive period ====
The Nido eruptive period was a long episode of volcanic activity between six and four million years ago that involved the effusion of highly mobile, fluid basaltic lava flows from multiple, widely spaced eruptive centres; these eruptive centres included at least six major volcanoes and many more smaller volcanic cones. The lava flows are mineralogically and geomorphologically similar to those of the Raspberry Formation, having buried lag gravels and travelled into valleys where they disrupted the drainage system to form lava-dammed lakes. Volcanism of the Nido eruptive period was limited to the northern and southern ends of the MEVC, such that the lava flows formed two separate lava fields, one at each end of the volcanic complex. The northern lava field is represented by the Tenchen Member while the southern lava field is represented by the Kounugu Member; they are separated by the Armadillo Highlands which acted as a topographic barrier at the time of their eruption. Volcanic activity in both lava fields occurred more or less simultaneously as shown by the existence of Armadillo clasts in glacial deposits that were overridden by lava flows in each field. In 1984, Canadian volcanologist Jack Souther described the lava flows from this period of activity as the remains of composite shield volcanoes.

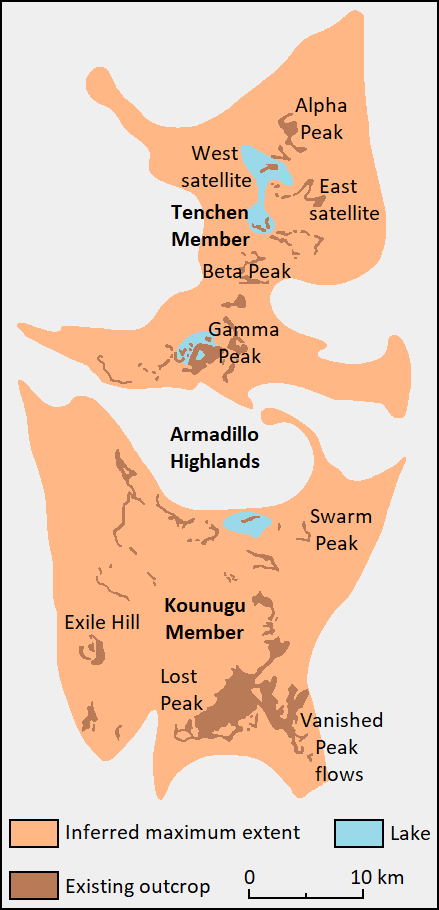
Paleogeological map of the Nido Formation at the end of the Nido eruptive period

Three major volcanoes of the Tenchen Member were active during the Nido eruptive period, all of which have since been reduced to eroded remnants. Alpha Peak was the oldest of them; it issued lava flows from both satellitic and central vents which diverted and blocked local streams to form lava-dammed lakes. The second oldest major volcano, Beta Peak, formed 12 km (7.5 mi) south of Alpha Peak. It rose at least 365 m (1,200 ft) above the surrounding landscape and produced lava flows that travelled at least 13 km (8.1 mi) to the north. Remnants of Alpha Peak and Beta Peak basalt are exposed south and east of Mount Edziza. Gamma Peak, the youngest of the three major volcanoes, formed south of Beta Peak on the western flanks of Cartoona Ridge. Lava flows from Gamma Peak buried gently sloping alluvial fans on the northern and western flanks of the Armadillo Highlands. An eroded remnant of this volcano forms a prominent rock pinnacle just southeast of Coffee Crater called Cartoona Peak; Kaia Bluff north of Cartoona Peak is also a remnant of Gamma Peak.

The Kounugu Member contains the eroded remains of at least four volcanoes that were active during Nido time. Swarm Peak, the oldest of the four volcanoes, issued lava flows that travelled down the western and southern flanks of the Little Iskut shield volcano. Vanished Peak further to the south was formed during a major eruption that involved lava fountaining; most of the lava from this eruption flowed to the north and west. Lost Peak consists of volcanic ejecta that was deposited in both subaerial and subaqueous environments; the subaqueous material was deposited in a lake that may have formed between the erupting volcano and a lobe of glacial ice. Exile Hill formed on the southwesternmost edge of the MEVC, most of which was engulfed by younger lava that had flowed to the north and west. Basalt from all four volcanoes is exposed around the perimeter of the younger Spectrum Range.

The Nido eruptions deposited 127 cubic kilometres (30 cubic miles) of volcanic material, making the Nido Formation the most voluminous geological formation of the second magmatic cycle. Potassium–argon dating of Nido alkali basalt has given ages of 7.8 ± 0.3 million years, 5.5 ± 1.6 million years, 4.5 ± 0.3 million years and 4.4 ± 0.5 million years. The first age comes from basal basalt of the Kounugu Member overlying basement rocks and, if correct, implies that the Nido eruptions may have initiated during the Raspberry eruptive period.

==== Spectrum eruptive period ====
The next eruptive period, the Spectrum period, occurred between four and two million years ago. A relatively small initial eruption of pumice and ash was followed by the effusion of massive rhyolite flows, each up to 150 m (490 ft) thick and 13 km (8.1 mi) long. These rhyolite flows accumulated in rapid succession to form the broad Spectrum Dome which reached a thickness of at least 750 m (2,460 ft) and a width of more than 25 km (16 mi). The predominantly rhyolitic eruptions were followed by the effusion of trachyte lava as deeper parts of the underlying magma chamber were tapped. Formation of the Spectrum Dome was followed by evacuation of the magma chamber, resulting in the creation of a 4.5 km (2.8 mi) wide caldera which was eventually buried by lava from subsequent eruptions.

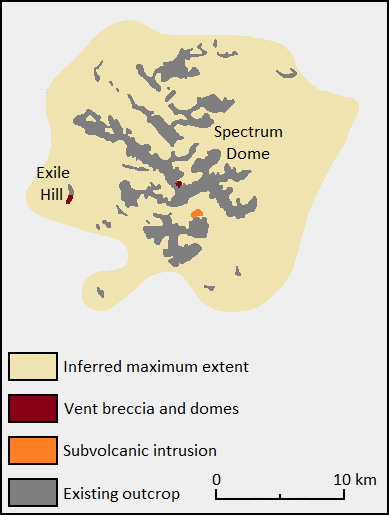
Paleogeological map of the Spectrum Formation at the end of the Spectrum eruptive period

Yeda Peak, a 2,240 m (7,350 ft) high pinnacle in the middle of the Spectrum Range, was the site of an explosive eruption late in Spectrum time that resulted in the formation of a crater. Some of the ejecta accumulated around the vent to form a low volcanic cone whereas the more volatile, pumice-rich phases of the eruption sent ash flows down the slopes of the Spectrum Dome. Renewed volcanism at Exile Hill 8 km (5.0 mi) to the west produced a similar but much smaller eruption that created a roughly 200 m (660 ft) wide breccia pipe. Late-stage volcanism of the Spectrum eruptive period also deposited alkali basalt flows of the Kitsu Member which likely issued from multiple eruptive centres on the dome's summit that have since been removed by erosion. These lava flows travelled over a layer of polymict gravel that overlies older volcanic rocks produced during Spectrum time.

The Spectrum eruptions deposited 118 cubic kilometres (28 cubic miles) of volcanic material, making the Spectrum Formation the second most voluminous geological formation of the second magmatic cycle. More than 90% of this volcanic material was erupted as lava whereas less than 10% of it was erupted as pumice and pyroclastic flows; trachyte, pantellerite and comendite are the main rocks comprising this volcanic material. An anomalously old potassium–argon date of 5.9 ± 1.1 million years has been obtained from Kitsu Member alkali basalt. Potassium–argon dates more in line with the volcanic stratigraphy include 3.1 ± 0.1 million years and 3.0 ± 0.1 million years from comendite and 3.4 ± 0.1 million years and 2.9 ± 0.1 million years from comenditic glass.

The once continuous Spectrum Dome was substantially eroded to form the current peaks and ridges of the Spectrum Range. Extensive erosion also reduced the size of the dome, leaving behind a few remnants around its northern and southwestern edges. Relatively thin trachyte flows northwest of the Spectrum Range on the Kitsu Plateau are the most distal remnants, although they may have originated from a nearby satellitic vent. Erosional remnants of Kitsu Member alkali basalt flows cap the higher summits of the Spectrum Range where they overlie the unmodified upper surface of the original dome. The original dome was higher in elevation as evidenced by the thick, gently dipping trachyte flows forming the 2,430-metre-high (7,972-foot) summit of Kitsu Peak, the highest point of the Spectrum Range.

==== Pyramid eruptive period ====
The Pyramid eruptive period 1.1 million years ago involved violent explosive eruptions of rock fragments, gas and trachyte pumice from a vent adjacent to the northwestern margin of the MEVC; this explosivity was accompanied by phreatic explosions and pyroclastic surges. Subsequent eruptions sent thin basalt flows into the valley of a north-flowing glacial stream where they formed a small lava-dammed lake. This short period of basaltic volcanism was followed by the extrusion of felsic flows and domes forming The Pyramid, a pyramid-shaped mound on the northeastern flank of Mount Edziza.

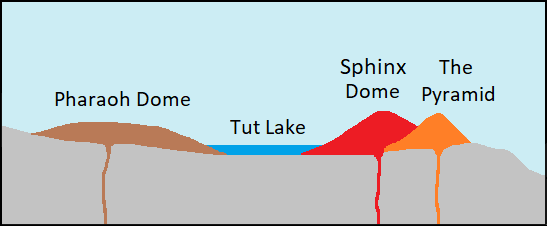
Cross section showing the maximum extent of the Pyramid Formation at the end of Pyramid time

Renewed volcanism during this eruptive period produced viscous rhyolite lava and volcanic ejecta of the Sphinx Dome which may have formed subglacially. Some of the ejecta settled in a lake that had formed between the growing dome and an ice field along its southern margin, resulting in the formation of an evenly distributed volcaniclastic (Note: Volcaniclastic rocks are rocks composed of broken fragments (clasts) of volcanic rock.) deposit on the lake bed. The Sphinx Dome reached a height of 800 m (2,600 ft) and a length of 5 km (3.1 mi) by the time activity ceased.

A third pulse of volcanism constructed the Pharaoh Dome just south of the lake that ponded during Sphinx Dome activity. Eruptions were at first subglacial which led to a series of phreatic steam explosions and the quenching of rhyolite lava by meltwater. Pharaoh Dome eventually built above the level of the surrounding ice as flows of rhyolite continued to enlarge the dome. By the time activity ceased, Pharaoh Dome had risen above the surface of a large ice field as a nunatak; it was subsequently buried under glacial ice.

The Pyramid eruptions were much less voluminous than those of the Nido and Spectrum eruptive periods, depositing only 11.4 cubic kilometres (2.7 cubic miles) of volcanic material; this makes the Pyramid Formation the least voluminous geological formation of the second magmatic cycle. Potassium–argon dating of comenditic glass produced during the Pyramid eruptive period has yielded ages of 1.2 ± 0.4 million years and 1.20 ± 0.03 million years. Trachyte produced during this eruptive period has yielded potassium–argon dates of 0.94 ± 0.12 million years and 0.94 ± 0.05 million years.

=== Third magmatic cycle ===
The third magmatic cycle occurred between about one and 0.8 million years ago during the Pleistocene. It was characterized by three distinct eruptive periods, each represented by a geological formation. The first eruptive period created the Ice Peak Formation which overlies the Armadillo, Nido and Pyramid formations. A wide variety of volcanic rocks comprise the Ice Peak Formation, including alkali basalt, hawaiite, trachybasalt, tristanite, mugearite, benmoreite and trachyte. The second eruptive period resulted in the creation of the Pillow Ridge Formation which consists mainly of alkali basalt. This geological formation is confined to Pillow Ridge and Tsekone Ridge at the northern end of the MEVC. The third eruptive period produced the Edziza Formation which consists mainly of trachyte that overlies the Ice Peak Formation.

==== Ice Peak eruptive period ====
The Ice Peak eruptive period began at a time when the MEVC was covered by a regional ice sheet. Volcanism initially began on the southern flank of Sphinx Dome where pyroclastic material mixed with meltwater from residual ice to produce highly mobile debris flows and lahars. Lava flows advanced across the glaciated surface as successive eruptions built Ice Peak, resulting in the formation of narrow meltwater lakes that were displaced as the lava flows continued to advance down slope. Basaltic lava travelled further down slope onto the Big Raven Plateau while more viscous trachybasalt, tristanite, mugearite, benmoreite and trachyte lava accumulated around the vent area to form the steep, upper part of Ice Peak. At its climax, Ice Peak was a symmetrical stratovolcano containing a small crater at its summit; its symmetrical structure was later destroyed by glacial erosion. An erosional remnant etched from the eastern crater rim forms Ice Peak's current 2,500 m (8,200 ft) high summit, exposing bedded tuff and debris that accumulated inside a former crater lake. Potassium–argon dating of massive trachyte flows in the upper part of Ice Peak has yielded ages of 1.5 ± 0.4 million years and 1.5 ± 0.1 million years. These dates being older than those of the Pyramid eruptive period may be due to excess argon in Ice Peak rocks and are therefore considered unreliable; the true age is estimated to be about one million years.

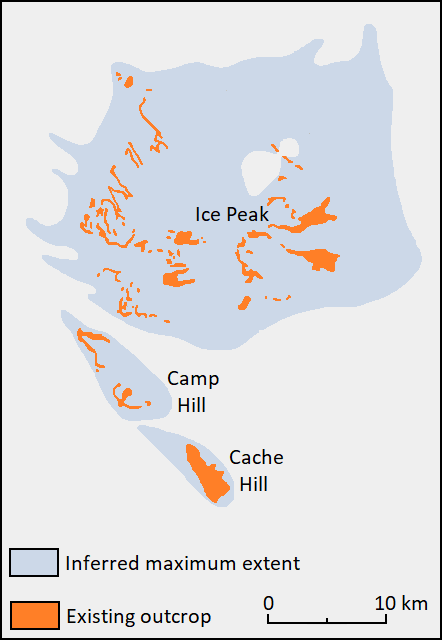
Paleogeological map of the Ice Peak Formation at the end of the Ice Peak eruptive period

Two thick lobes of trachyte lava issued from satellitic domes on the western flank of Ice Peak during this eruptive period, both of which were deposited onto the Big Raven Plateau. The southern lobe, Koosick Bluff, ranges in elevation from 1,890 to 2,010 m (6,200 to 6,590 ft) and is bounded by cliffs that rise 60–90 m (200–300 ft) to a nearly flat surface. With a length of nearly 2 km (1.2 mi) and a width of more than 1 km (0.62 mi), Koosick Bluff is the largest of the two lava lobes. The northern and smaller lobe, Ornostay Bluff, is similar in composition and structure to Koosick Bluff; it has a potassium–argon date of 1.5 ± 0.4 million years which may be due to excess argon. The steep sides and unusually large thicknesses of these two lava lobes is attributed to them having been extruded through glacial ice.

Volcanic activity during Ice Peak time created two volcanoes west of the Armadillo Highlands. The northern volcano, Camp Hill, began forming when the MEVC was still partially covered by glacial ice. Eruptions under the glacial ice formed a circular meltwater pond which quenched the erupting lava and caused phreatic explosions, resulting in fractured and churned debris accumulating around the erupting vent to create a broad tuff ring. This feature eventually grew above the level of the meltwater pond to produce subaerial lava fountains which formed a relatively steep-sided pyroclastic cone on top of the tuff ring. By this time the surrounding glacial ice had retreated, allowing basalt flows to spread over the Big Raven Plateau. The southern cinder cone, Cache Hill, formed during a period of eruptions on the western side of the Armadillo Highlands; basalt flows blocked a northwesterly flowing river in a broad valley to form a lava-dammed lake. Subsequent basalt flows travelled to the southeast and northwest, the southeasterly flows entering the lava-dammed lake to create pillow lava.

A circular volcanic plug called The Neck formed southeast of Ice Peak on the northern side of Sorcery Ridge during this eruptive period. It was the source of more than one trachyte eruption; the magma from these eruptions solidified in the conduit to create the outer ring of fine grained trachyte and the inner core of coarse grained trachyte comprising The Neck. This volcanic plug, roughly 300 m (980 ft) in diameter, has a potassium–argon date of 1.6 ± 0.2 million years which may be due to excess argon.

The eruptions during Ice Peak time deposited 76.7 cubic kilometres (18.4 cubic miles) of volcanic material, making the Ice Peak Formation the most voluminous geological formation of the third magmatic cycle. This is the latest MEVC eruptive period involving the outpouring of more than 20 cubic kilometres (4.8 cubic miles) of lava. It is also the only eruptive period of the MEVC involving the eruption of large volumes of intermediate rocks.

==== Pillow Ridge eruptive period ====
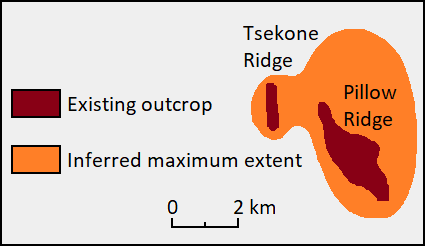
Paleogeological map of the Pillow Ridge Formation at the end of the Pillow Ridge eruptive period

The next eruptive period, the Pillow Ridge period, occurred when the MEVC was still overlain by an ice sheet. Subglacial volcanism at the northern end of the Big Raven Plateau injected basaltic lava into the base of the ice sheet where the molten basalt was quenched in a meltwater cavity. Accumulation of this quenched lava resulted in the formation of a pillow mound under glacial ice between 300 and 930 m (980 and 3,050 ft) thick. As the volcanic activity progressed, it became more energetic and created a subglacial cone of tuff breccia at least 300 m (980 ft) in height. Formation of the cone was accompanied with Surtseyan explosions which may have been caused by a change in eruption rate, a change in confining pressure, or a change in the nature of the magma being erupted. Breaching of the ice surface, upwards growth of the pillow mound, or the draining of meltwater may have contributed to a drop in confining pressure. This stage of the eruption was followed by the effusion of two pillow lava units under at least 300–600 m (980–1,970 ft) of water or ice; a relative episode of quiescence took place between the emplacement of these two units. The final stage of volcanic activity, which resulted in the creation of Pillow Ridge on the northwestern flank of Mount Edziza, involved the effusion of two other overlying pillow lava units.

Another pulse of subglacial volcanism during the Pillow Ridge period created nearby Tsekone Ridge. Interaction with the surrounding ice and meltwater created pillow lava interbedded with tuff breccia which was likely fed by a fissure. This north–south elongated ridge formed in a similar environment to that of Pillow Ridge and is considered to be a subglacial mound, a glaciovolcanic landform created when a volcano does not build above the surrounding meltwater during a subglacial eruption. The basaltic magma that issued during the Tsekone Ridge eruption may have been left over from the volcanism that formed Pillow Ridge.

The eruptions during Pillow Ridge time were much less voluminous than those of the Ice Peak eruptive period, depositing only 2.9 cubic kilometres (0.70 cubic miles) of volcanic material; this makes the Pillow Ridge Formation the least voluminous geological formation of the third magmatic cycle. Fission track dating of alkali basalt from Pillow Ridge has yielded ages of 0.9 ± 0.3 million years and 0.8 ± 0.25 million years, potentially making Pillow Ridge the best documented example of where the Cordilleran Ice Sheet reached a regional high point during the middle Pleistocene.

==== Edziza eruptive period ====
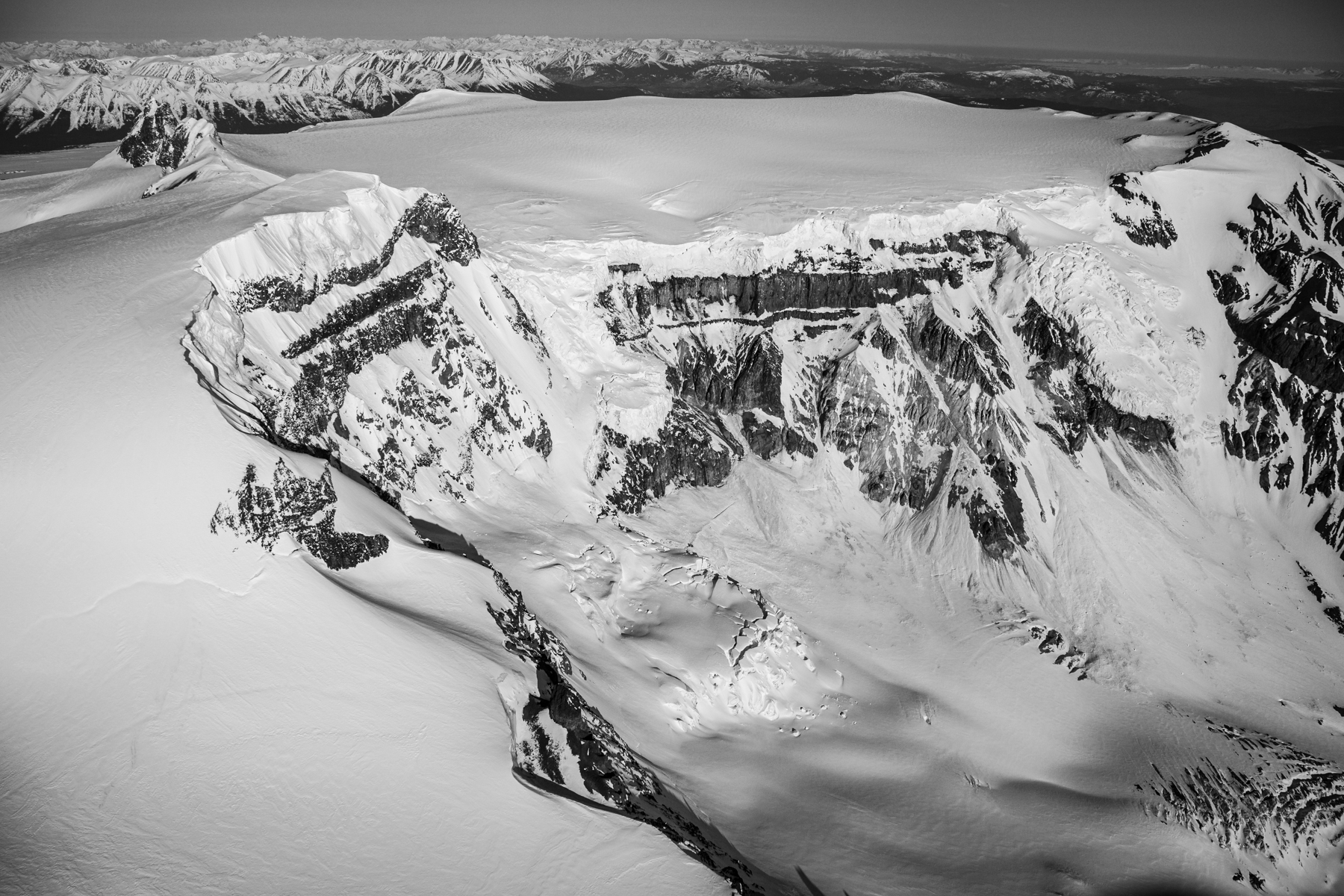
The summit crater of Mount Edziza

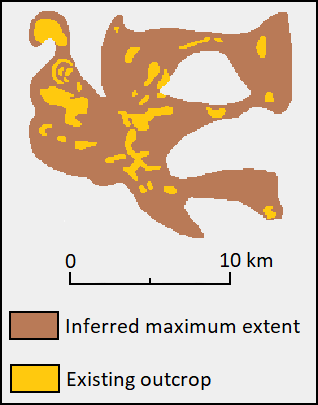
Paleogeological map of the Edziza Formation at the end of Edziza time

The Edziza eruptive period constructed the symmetrical stratovolcano of Mount Edziza after the regional ice sheet had retreated from the MEVC. Growth began on the upper northern flank of Ice Peak with the eruption of viscous trachyte flows and steep-sided lava domes; dome formation was punctuated by vent-clearing explosions which ejected volcanic blocks and lava bombs onto the slopes of the growing stratovolcano. Formation of the stratovolcano was followed by collapse of the original summit, creating the 2 km (1.2 mi) in diameter crater that truncates it. The cause of this collapse may have been a violent, climactic eruption that deposited parts of the original summit onto the flanks of the volcano. Prior to collapse, the summit of Mount Edziza was at least 610 m (2,000 ft) higher than its current elevation of 2,786 m (9,140 ft). Part of the eastern crater rim was destroyed by a small phreatic explosion which provided a new passageway for the venting of volcanic gases. Individual lava flows range from 1–5 m (3.3–16.4 ft) to as much as 150 m (490 ft) thick; this variation in thickness may have been due to changes in viscosity as volcanic gases escaped the erupting magma. The trachyte erupted during this period straddles the pantelleritic trachyte and comenditic trachyte boundary.

The Edziza eruptions deposited 18 cubic kilometres (4.3 cubic miles) of volcanic material; this makes the Edziza Formation the second most voluminous geological formation of the third magmatic cycle. Most of the volcanic activity during Edziza time occurred from the summit of Mount Edziza, but at least a few vents were active on the flanks of the volcano. Volcanism on the southeastern rim of the summit crater created Nanook Dome; lava from this dome flowed down the exterior flanks of the stratovolcano and also into the summit crater to form lava lakes. The Triangle and Glacier domes formed on the western and northeastern flanks of Mount Edziza, respectively; Triangle Dome may be the product of subglacial volcanism. A trachyte flow from Glacier Dome travelled around the base of the older Pyramid Dome into the head of Pyramid Creek. Lava from a small pyroclastic cone on the northwestern flank of Mount Edziza nearly engulfed Tsekone Ridge and partially buried Pillow Ridge; this lava and the associated pyroclastic cone may have been products of volcanism during the latter stages of the Edziza eruptive period. Edziza trachyte of comenditic composition has yielded a potassium–argon date of 0.9 ± 0.3 million years.

=== Fourth magmatic cycle ===
The fourth magmatic cycle took place between 0.8 and 0.2 million years ago during the Pleistocene. Like the previous three magmatic cycles, it was characterized by three distinct eruptive periods. The first eruptive period created the Arctic Lake Formation which underlies much of the Arctic Lake Plateau near the Spectrum Range. Alkali basalt flows and related pyroclastic rocks comprise the Arctic Lake Formation. The second eruptive period is represented by the Klastline Formation along the Kakiddi and Klastline valleys; thick alkali basalt flows are the main features of this geological formation. The third eruptive period produced thick trachyte flows and pyroclastic rocks of the Kakiddi Formation which occupy valleys on the eastern flank of Ice Peak.

==== Arctic Lake eruptive period ====
The Arctic Lake eruptive period 0.71 million years ago created at least seven basaltic volcanoes on and adjacent to the Arctic Lake Plateau. Lava fountaining at the extreme northern end of the Arctic Lake Plateau created the Outcast Hill cinder cone which blocked westerly flowing streams to create a temporary lake against its eastern side. Lava from Outcast Hill flowed into the lake, but most of it travelled to the northwest towards the Mess Creek Escarpment. Tadekho Hill, a cinder cone 4 km (2.5 mi) to the south, formed on top of a 180 m (590 ft) high remnant of Spectrum trachyte. Outcast Hill and Tadekho Hill both formed when the Arctic Lake Plateau was relatively free of glacial ice.

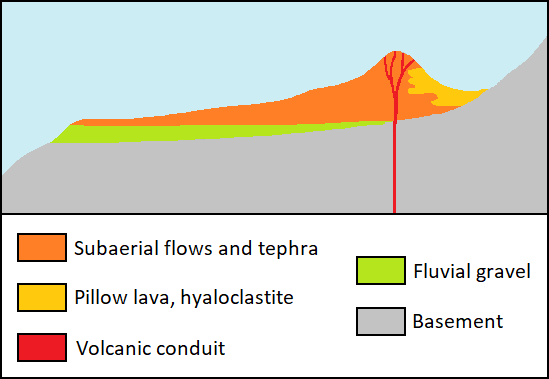
Cross section of Outcast Hill

The Arctic Lake Plateau was subsequently covered with ice as glaciers advanced from the neighbouring Spectrum Range. Subglacial volcanism at the height of this glacial advance created Wetalth Ridge, a subglacial mound near the middle of the plateau. This was followed by the eruption of four other volcanoes on the Arctic Lake Plateau during the waning stages of glaciation. Two small mounds of quenched pillow lava informally called Knob 1 and Knob 2 formed subglacially about 4 km (2.5 mi) south of Wetalth Ridge. The third volcano, Source Hill, is a cinder cone that was created about 3 km (1.9 mi) to the northwest during a massive eruption of lava when only the central part of the Arctic Lake Plateau contained a thin lobe of glacial ice. Late-stage volcanism during Arctic Lake time formed Thaw Hill, a cinder cone about 7 km (4.3 mi) east-southeast of Source Hill on the eastern side of the Arctic Lake Plateau.

The Arctic Lake eruptions were much less voluminous than those of the Edziza eruptive period, depositing only 2 cubic kilometres (0.48 cubic miles) of volcanic material; this makes the Arctic Lake Formation the least voluminous geological formation of the fourth magmatic cycle. Alkali basalt of this eruptive period mainly rests on Mesozoic and Paleozoic rocks of the Stikinia terrane, although it also locally overlies rhyolite of the Spectrum Formation. Nearly all of the basalt was erupted at elevations greater than 1,000 m (3,300 ft), but at least one basalt flow descended into Mess Creek valley. Subaerial alkali basalt flows are large in areal extent and have thicknesses of 2 to 3 m (6.6 to 9.8 ft). Arctic Lake Formation alkali basalt has yielded potassium–argon dates of 0.71 ± 0.05 million years and 0.45 ± 0.07 million years.

==== Klastline eruptive period ====
The Klastline eruptive period 0.62 million years ago was characterized by minor lava fountaining and the effusion of massive basalt flows from at least three vents along the northern flank of Mount Edziza. The basalt flows travelled adjacent to Buckley Lake on the northwestern side of the Big Raven Plateau and into the Klastline and Kakiddi valleys north and east of the plateau. Explosive interaction between lava and meltwater from an alpine glacier formed the Klastline tuff cone higher up on the plateau whereas eruptions on the lower slopes of the plateau created subaerial pyroclastic cones. Lava from Klastline Cone entered Kakiddi Valley where it blocked Kakiddi Creek and then flowed north across dry gravel bars to the confluence with Klastline Valley, temporarily damming the Klastline River to form a large shallow lake. Most of the lava continued to flow westward through Klastline Valley and reached the Stikine River.

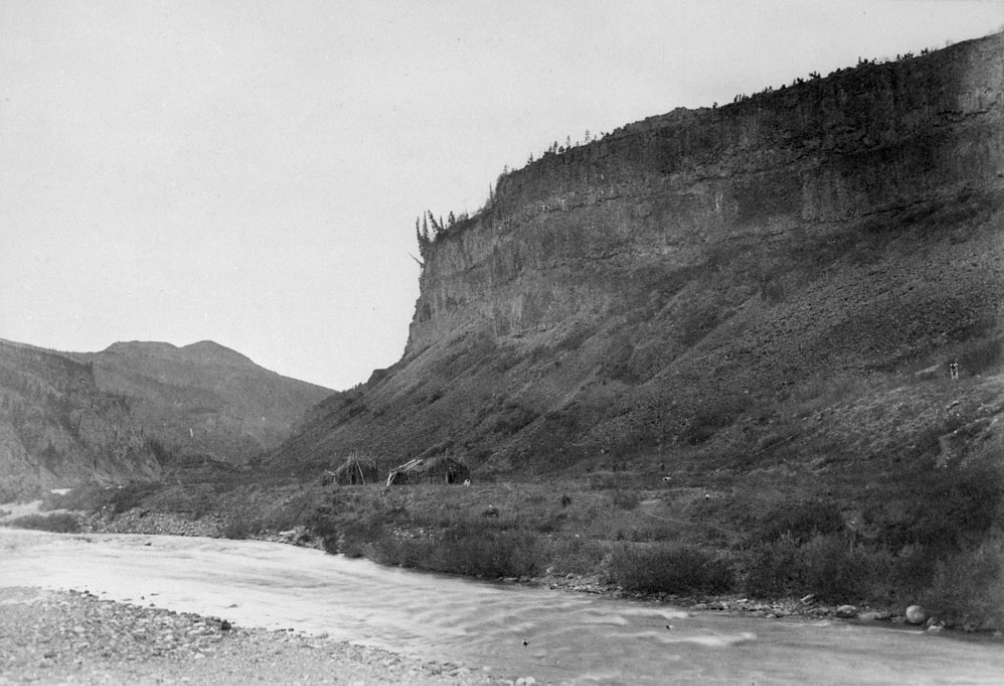
Lava flows overlying sediment at the mouth of the Tahltan River

Lava of the Klastline eruptive period continued to flow 55 km (34 mi) downstream along the Stikine River from its confluence with the Klastline River. As the lava advanced it buried glacial and nonglacial sediment along the Stikine and Tahltan rivers; isolated remnants of this lava are preserved along the river canyon walls and are subdivided into two geological members. The Junction Member is characterized by swirly jointed basalt whereas the overlying Village Member consists of regular columnar basalt jointing. At least five distinct lava flows comprise the Village Member which collectively reach a maximum thickness of 100 m (330 ft) and are vesicular in texture. The Klastline lava along the Stikine River had travelled some 83 km (52 mi) from the MEVC.

The Klastline eruptive period deposited 5.4 cubic kilometres (1.3 cubic miles) of volcanic material, making the Klastline Formation the second most voluminous geological formation of the fourth magmatic cycle. Potassium–argon dating of Klastline alkali basalt has yielded ages of 0.62 ± 0.04 million years and 0.33 ± 0.03 million years. The first date is from a lava flow remnant in Klastline Valley whereas the second date is from a Village Member basalt flow on the Tahltan River. Argon–argon dating of Village Member basalt about 2 km (1.2 mi) downstream from the mouth of the Tahltan River on the east bank of the Stikine River has yielded an age of 0.30 ± 0.10 million years.

==== Kakiddi eruptive period ====
The Kakiddi eruptive period 0.3 million years ago involved the eruption of a massive trachyte flow that reaches almost 1 km (0.62 mi) wide and 60–90 m (200–300 ft) thick. It advanced 7 km (4.3 mi) down the eastern flank of the MEVC into Kakiddi Valley where it spread out into a more than 20 km^{2} (7.7 mi^{2}) terminal lobe near Kakiddi and Nuttlude lakes. The source of this lava flow remains unknown, but it may have originated from Ice Peak and possibly Nanook Dome at the summit of Mount Edziza. Another possible source is The Neck which lies at the western end of the inferred maximum extent of this lava flow. However, this possibility cannot be confirmed until additional age-related data are provided for The Neck.

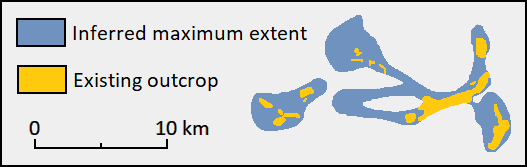
Paleogeological map of the Kakiddi Formation at the end of Kakiddi time

Minor tristanite and a relatively small but thick trachyte flow issued from a vent on the western flank of Ice Peak where it advanced onto the Big Raven Plateau. Breccia and spatter agglutinated around the vent area to create Punch Cone, a roughly 1 km (0.62 mi) long, steep-sided ridge projecting through Mount Edziza's ice cap. Pyroclastic rocks erupted during Kakiddi time are exposed on the eastern flank of Mount Edziza where they take the form of scoria and blocky explosion breccia.

The Kakiddi eruptions deposited 8.3 cubic kilometres (2.0 cubic miles) of volcanic material; this makes the Kakiddi Formation the most voluminous geological formation of the fourth magmatic cycle. Potassium–argon dating has yielded ages of 0.31 ± 0.07 million years for Kakiddi mugearite and 0.30 ± 0.02 million years, 0.29 ± 0.02 million years and 0.28 ± 0.02 million years for Kakiddi trachyte, suggesting that the Kakiddi eruptions may have been coeval with those of the Klastline period. Kakiddi trachyte likely erupted more fluidly than trachyte of the Edziza eruptive period, but its mineralogical composition is nevertheless similar to Edziza trachyte. The Kakiddi eruptive period was short-lived as suggested by the small error and close clustering of the potassium–argon dates.

=== Fifth magmatic cycle ===
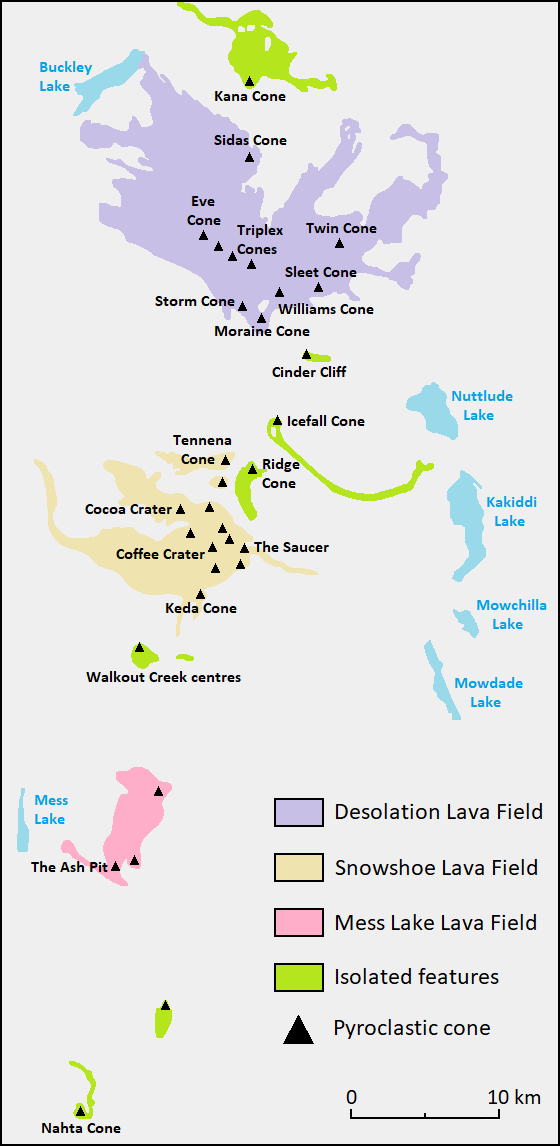
Geological map of the Big Raven Formation

The fifth magmatic cycle, which may still be ongoing, commenced at least 20,000 years ago with the onset of the Big Raven eruptive period. It was marked by the eruption of subglacial volcanoes, cinder cones and lava flows along the entire length of the MEVC, as well as a single eruption of pumice from the southwestern flank of Ice Peak. Most of the Big Raven eruptions took place on the western flank of Ice Peak and on the northern flank of Mount Edziza where lava flows from several vents accumulated to form the Desolation and Snowshoe lava fields. Volcanic activity in the two lava fields most likely overlapped in time and display similar surficial features. The exact timing of Big Raven volcanism is unknown, but it may have initiated during the Last Glacial Maximum between 23,000 and 18,000 years ago. At least 1.7 cubic kilometres (0.41 cubic miles) of volcanic material has been deposited by the Big Raven eruptions.

The rocks deposited during the Big Raven eruptive period comprise the Big Raven Formation. This geological formation consists mainly of alkali basalts and hawaittes, but it also contains a small volume of comenditic trachyte assigned to the Sheep Track Member. More than 29 eruptions took place during this eruptive period, most of which resulted in the creation of cinder cones. These cones are of Holocene age and occur on Mount Edziza, in the Snowshoe and Desolation lava fields and adjacent to the Spectrum Range. Eruptions during Big Raven time continued within the last 2,000 years, but the exact age of the latest one is unknown; it may have occurred between 450 and 160 years ago. Holocene eruptions of the MEVC have been mainly characterized by the effusion of basaltic lava flows, but at least one explosive eruption has also occurred.

Volcanism during the fifth magmatic cycle may have deposited the Finlay tephras. These are two 5-to-10-millimetre-thick (0.20-to-0.39-inch) tephra layers of phonolitic to trachytic composition in the Dease Lake and Finlay River areas of northern British Columbia. Radiocarbon dating of terrestrial plant macrofossils directly overlying the youngest tephra layer suggest an Early Holocene age for this volcanic material. MEVC volcanic deposits of Late Pleistocene and Early Holocene age are largely basaltic in composition, but their exact ages and chemical compositions are not well-known. Therefore, the MEVC has been suggested as a potential source for these two tephra layers along with Hoodoo Mountain, Heart Peaks and Level Mountain.

==== Snowshoe Lava Field ====
One of the first volcanoes to erupt during the Big Raven eruptive period was Tennena Cone which formed high on the western flank of Ice Peak. It issued basaltic magma under an ice sheet during the Last Glacial Maximum, under an expansion of Mount Edziza's ice cap during the Younger Dryas between 12,900 and 11,600 years ago or during a more recent glacial advance. As the molten basalt accumulated around the erupting vent, it was quenched by the overlying ice to form the steep-sided, pyramid-shaped pile of pillow breccia and tuff breccia that comprises Tennena Cone. A meltwater channel thawed from the base of the cone provided the pathway for a thin lava flow. As the lava flow reached the western edge of the ice, it caused a violent interaction with meltwater which spread onto the Big Raven Plateau. Two unnamed volcanoes also in the Snowshoe Lava Field formed subglacially south of Tennena Cone.

After the ice retreated from lower elevations, renewed volcanism in the Snowshoe Lava Field constructed Cocoa Crater, Coffee Crater, Keda Cone and other subaerial cinder cones by lava fountaining. Their construction was accompanied by the eruption of very large lava flows that travelled west into the valleys of Sezill Creek and Taweh Creek at the southwestern end of the Big Raven Plateau. A fissure eruption from The Saucer south of Tencho Glacier issued lava flows that travelled west into Taweh Creek and east into Shaman Creek; this was one of the most recent eruptions in the Snowshoe Lava Field.

==== Arctic Lake Plateau and east slope centres ====
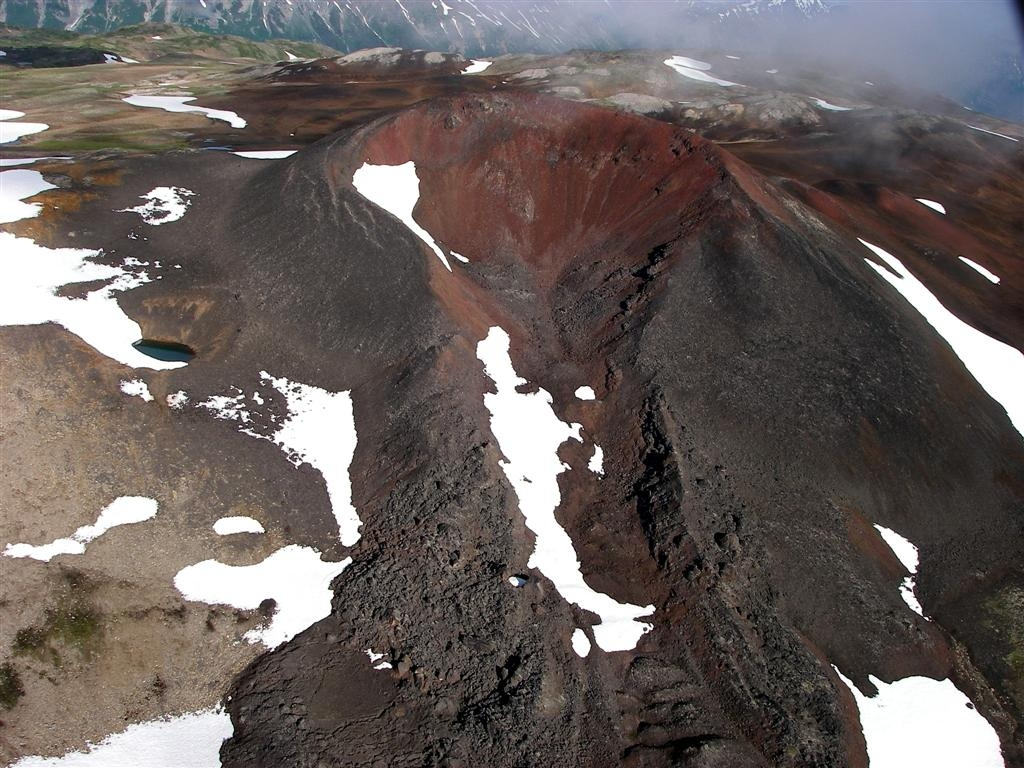
Nahta Cone from the east

At least three eruptive centres were active on the deeply eroded eastern flank of Mount Edziza during Big Raven time. Cinder Cliff in the northern fork of Tenchen Creek valley formed when an eruption of basaltic magma ponded against an ice dam and engulfed debris such as moraine and talus. The other two eruptive centres, Icefall Cone and Ridge Cone, consist of bombs and agglutinate; they have been glaciated and are poorly exposed. Both cones produced lava flows but they are also poorly exposed, having been almost completely buried under glacial ice and debris. A more than 10 km (6.2 mi) long lava flow occupying a narrow, wedge-shaped valley on the eastern slope of Mount Edziza may have originated from Icefall Cone, Ridge Cone or an undiscovered vent inside the valley. Its terminus lies between Kakiddi and Nuttlude lakes where it is well exposed for 2 km (1.2 mi).

Two Big Raven centres formed at the southern end of the MEVC. The southernmost eruptive centre, Nahta Cone, erupted about 7 km (4.3 mi) southwest of the Spectrum Range near the northern edge of the Arctic Lake Plateau and produced a narrow, 3 km (1.9 mi) long basaltic lava flow that travelled northward into the head of Nahta Creek. Extending roughly 500 m (1,600 ft) west and 700 m (2,300 ft) north of Nahta Cone are two tephra deposits; their distribution suggests that the volcano was in eruption at least twice during two differing wind directions. The other eruptive centre is a now-destroyed cinder cone that formed on the unstable southern flank of Kuno Peak at the southwestern end of the Spectrum Range. It produced a basaltic lava flow that travelled onto the Arctic Lake Plateau, but subsequent landsliding on Kuno Peak removed much of the original cone and buried the associated lava flow.

==== Desolation and Mess Lake lava fields ====
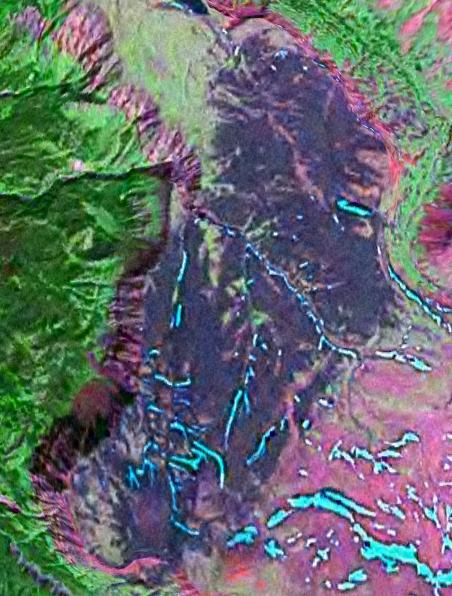
False colour image of air-fall tephra on the Kitsu Plateau from The Ash Pit which is the bottom circular depression

The first cones to form in the Desolation Lava Field were the Sleet and Storm cones, which are about 4 km (2.5 mi) apart and produced lava flows that travelled over glacial till. Later volcanism created the three Triplex Cones 3 km (1.9 mi) north of Storm Cone which issued a 12 km (7.5 mi) long series of lava flows extending northwesterly to near the south shore of Buckley Lake. Renewed eruptive activity formed the Sidas and Twin cones 8 km (5.0 mi) apart, both of which are products of simultaneous lava fountaining from more than one vent. Lava flows from these cones travelled to the northwest and northeast, respectively. Moraine Cone 10 km (6.2 mi) south of Sidas Cone was created by a subsequent eruption that issued a roughly 14 km (8.7 mi) long lava flow; this lava flow travelled northeast into the valleys of Kakiddi Creek and Klastline River where it temporarily dammed both streams. The latest eruptions in the Desolation Lava Field formed the Eve and Williams cones 5 km (3.1 mi) apart, which issued lava flows more than 10 km (6.2 mi) long that reached Buckley Lake and the Klastline River, respectively. Willow twigs preserved in ejecta from Williams Cone have yielded a radiocarbon date of 610 CE ± 150 years.

The Mess Lake Lava Field northwest of the Spectrum Range issued from three cinder cones adjacent to the edge of the Mess Creek Escarpment. Lava flows from the two oldest cones travelled to the west and most likely cascaded down the escarpment into Mess Creek valley, but no evidence of this phenomenon has been found on or below the escarpment. The youngest cinder cone, The Ash Pit, formed at the south end of the Mess Lake Lava Field on the northern side of Nagha Creek. The Ash Pit eruption, which may be the most recent of the MEVC, issued mainly pyroclastic ejecta in the form of ash and cinders; much of this material was blown to the north-northeast by a strong, uniform wind during eruption and deposited onto the Kitsu Plateau. Some lava did, however, flow to the northwest through Nagha Creek valley towards Mess Lake in Mess Creek valley.

==== Kana Cone and Walkout Creek centres ====
The Kana Cone eruption about 18 km (11 mi) north of Mount Edziza was characterized by the effusion of basaltic lava flows and the build up of volcanic ejecta around the erupting vent. Several lobes of lava were produced during this eruption, some of which flowed around eroded remnants of lava produced during the Klastline eruptive period and engulfed Klastline Valley where they temporarily dammed the river. The lava dam formed a new route for the Klastline River along the northern valley wall where it still flows to this day, although some of the lava may have flowed further downstream where it potentially reached the Stikine River to form another temporary dam. Several episodes of lava effusion occurred during the Kana Cone eruption, each resulting in the formation of new lava channels.

Two small Big Raven cinder cones formed in Walkout Creek valley about 18 km (11 mi) southwest of Mount Edziza, both of which produced basaltic lava flows. The larger cone is about 120 m (390 ft) high and was constructed on top of a slow-moving landslide originating from the northern side of the valley. Bombs and agglutinated spatter of the smaller cone about 3 km (1.9 mi) to the east are exposed north of Walkout Creek where they overlie colluvium deposits. Deep dissection has occurred at both cones, the larger cone having been segmented into arcuate, step-like slices from continued movement of the landslide.

==== Sheep Track Member ====
A small but violent VEI-3 eruption occurred from a vent on the southwestern flank of Ice Peak near the end of the Big Raven eruptive period. It deposited granular trachyte pumice of the Sheep Track Member which fell over an area of about 40 km^{2} (15 mi^{2}). Larger, snowball-sized chunks of this pumice fell near the vent area whereas smaller, pea-sized fragments landed around the perimeter of the deposit. All of the Snowshoe Lava Field flows and cones are covered by Sheep Track pumice with the exception of The Saucer which likely postdates the Sheep Track eruption. The location of the vent that ejected the pumice is unknown, but it may lie under Tencho Glacier, the largest glacier of the MEVC. Fission track dating indicates the Sheep Track pumice was erupted in the last 7,000 years, most likely around 950 CE.

== Significance ==
=== Indigenous peoples ===
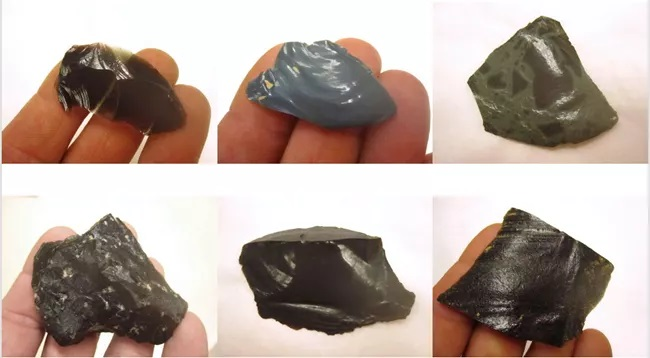
Obsidian from the Mount Edziza volcanic complex found in coastal areas of southeast Alaska

Volcanism of the MEVC produced at least 10 distinct flows of obsidian, some of which were used by indigenous peoples in prehistory to manufacture projectile points and cutting blades. The obsidian was widely traded throughout the Pacific Northwest; it has been recovered from archaeological sites in Alaska, Yukon, western Alberta and along the British Columbia Coast. It occurs over an area of more than 2,200,000 km^{2} (850,000 mi^{2}), making MEVC obsidian the most widely distributed obsidian in western North America. Obsidian from the Hidden Falls archaeological site in Alaska has yielded a hydration date of 10,000 years; this suggests that the MEVC was being exploited as an obsidian source soon after ice sheets of the Last Glacial Period retreated.

Obsidian from the MEVC occurs in at least four geological formations, the largest occurrence being centred on Goat Mountain of the Spectrum Formation. The Armadillo Formation contains five flows of obsidian that are more widely distributed throughout the MEVC; locations include Cartoona Peak, Coffee Crater, Destell Pass, Artifact Creek and the Artifact Creek–Fan Creek confluence. The Ice Peak and Pyramid formations each contain two flows of obsidian that occur on Sorcery Ridge and The Pyramid, respectively.

=== Paleo-ice conditions ===
Volcanism of the MEVC is glaciologically significant because some of its volcanic deposits have recorded evidence of ice presence and thickness in a region that has received insignificant field research on ice conditions before the Last Glacial Period about 115,000 to 11,700 years ago. The earliest recorded evidence of ice presence at the MEVC is preserved in the 4.4-million-year-old Nido Formation, which contains glacial deposits that are interbedded with lava flows. A record of Early Pleistocene glaciation is preserved by a sequence of diamictites between basaltic lava flows of the approximately one-million-year-old Ice Peak Formation.

The lowermost basalt flow of the Ice Peak Formation contains basal pillows; it also directly overlies hyaloclastites and is brecciated and deformed, suggesting that it may have been extruded onto a glacier or an ice sheet. The thicknesses of Ornostay Bluff of the Ice Peak Formation and Triangle Dome of the 0.9-million-year-old Edziza Formation suggest that they were extruded when the MEVC was covered with at least 225 m (738 ft) of glacial ice. Glacial sediment under a 0.3-million-year-old basalt flow of the Klastline Formation in the Stikine River valley corresponds with marine isotope stage 10 of the Middle Pleistocene.

== Future volcanism ==
The possibility of renewed volcanism of the MEVC cannot be ruled out since it is one of the most recently active volcanic complexes in Canada. It is also generally regarded to be dormant rather than extinct, having undergone several pulses of eruptive activity over the last 2,000 years. Any renewed volcanism of the MEVC would possibly be similar to what has occurred throughout its long volcanic history, potentially producing explosive eruptions and damming local streams with lava flows. Glaciovolcanism is also a possibility since the MEVC contains an ice cap that covers an area of about 70 km^{2} (27 mi^{2}). Explosive volcanism could disrupt parts of northwestern Canada; ash columns can drift for thousands of kilometres downwind and often become increasingly spread out over a larger area with increasing distance from an erupting vent.

== See also ==
- Volcanism of Western Canada
- Geology of British Columbia
