= Mess Creek Escarpment =

Escarpment in British Columbia, Canada

- Escarpment
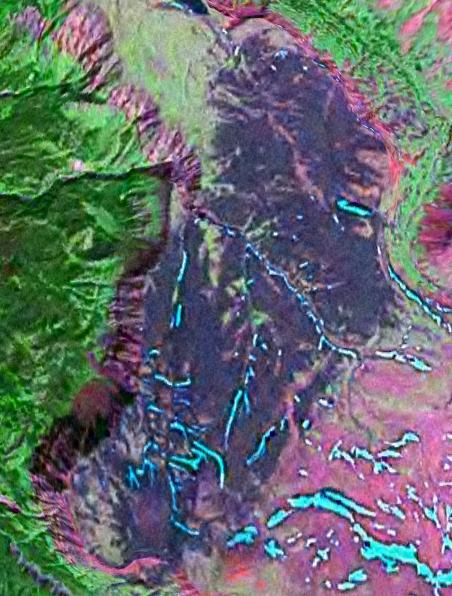
- False colour image of the Kitsu Plateau; the cliff forming the western edge of the plateau is the southern portion of the Mess Creek Escarpment

- Location in British Columbia
- Location in Mount Edziza Provincial Park
- Coordinates: 57°34′35″N 130°47′58″W
- Location: British Columbia, Canada
- Range: Tahltan Highland
- Part of: East-central side of Mess Creek valley and west-central side of the Mount Edziza complex
- Defining authority: BC Geographic Names office in Victoria, British Columbia
- Elevation: Above 1,700 m (5,500 ft)
- Topo map: NTS 104G10 Mount Edziza
- Designation: Mount Edziza Provincial Park
- Formations: Oldest to youngest: Raspberry Formation, Armadillo Formation, Nido Formation, Spectrum Formation, Ice Peak Formation, Big Raven Formation
- Rocks: Comendite, trachyte, hawaiite, alkali basalt

The Mess Creek Escarpment is a long, discontinuous cliff along Mess Creek in Cassiar Land District of northwestern British Columbia, Canada. It forms the east-central side of Mess Creek valley and consists of two segments separated about 5 kilometres (3.1 miles) by Walkout Creek valley. The northern segment extends about 8 km (5.0 mi) southeast along the southwestern side of the Big Raven Plateau, whereas the southern segment extends generally south along the northwestern, western and southwestern edges of the Kitsu Plateau for about 10 km (6.2 mi). With an elevation of more than 1,700 metres (5,500 feet), the Mess Creek Escarpment rises more than 910 m (3,000 ft) above the floor of Mess Creek valley. The escarpment lies within the boundaries of Mount Edziza Provincial Park.

The Mess Creek Escarpment forms the west-central side of the Mount Edziza volcanic complex and consists of at least six geological formations, each being the product of a distinct period of volcanic activity over the last 7.5 million years. With the exception of the Armadillo and Spectrum formations which consist of basalt, trachyte and comendite, volcanic rocks of the Raspberry, Nido, Ice Peak and Big Raven formations exposed along the escarpment are mainly basaltic in composition. Underlying these geological formations are much older Paleozoic and Mesozoic rocks of the Stikinia terrane, as well as and Cretaceous and Paleocene rocks of the Sustut Group.

== Name and etymology ==
The Mess Creek Escarpment was officially named on January 2, 1980. Its name was adopted on the National Topographic System map 104G after being submitted to the BC Geographical Names office by the Geological Survey of Canada. It was required for geology reporting purposes since Jack Souther, a volcanologist of the Geological Survey of Canada, was studying the area in detail between 1970 and 1992. The escarpment was named for its association with Mess Creek, a tributary of the Stikine River which flows into Sumner Strait of southeast Alaska. It is one of two officially named escarpments in British Columbia, the other being the Etsho Escarpment northeast of Fort Nelson in Peace River Land District.

== Geography ==
The Mess Creek Escarpment is in the Tahltan Highland east of the Boundary Ranges of the Coast Mountains and west of the Skeena Mountains and Klastline Plateau in Cassiar Land District. It forms the east-central side of Mess Creek valley and the west-central side of the Mount Edziza volcanic complex, consisting of two segments separated about 5 km (3.1 mi) by Walkout Creek valley. The northern segment extends southeast along the southwestern side of the Big Raven Plateau for about 8 km (5.0 mi) where it reaches an elevation of at least 1,700 m (5,500 ft). This segment is drained by at least four unnamed tributaries of Mess Creek, which is less than 760 m (2,500 ft) in elevation.

The southern segment also reaches an elevation of more than 1,700 m (5,500 ft) and extends generally south along the northwestern, western and southwestern edges of the Kitsu Plateau for about 10 km (6.2 mi). The Mess Creek Escarpment therefore has a total length of approximately 23 km (14 mi) and rises more than 910 m (3,000 ft) above the floor of Mess Creek valley. At least five streams flow down the southern segment into Mess Creek valley, including Kitsu Creek which originates from Kitsu Peak in the Spectrum Range. Mess Lake, an expansion of Mess Creek, lies below the southern segment of the Mess Creek Escarpment.

The Mess Creek Escarpment lies at the western end of Mount Edziza Provincial Park, a protected area established in 1972 to preserve the volcanic landscape. This remote wilderness area of northwestern British Columbia is not accessible by motorized vehicles to help protect the very sensitive environment. Instead, access is mainly via aircraft or unmaintained hiking trails that cross creeks. Mount Edziza Provincial Park covers 266,180 hectares (657,700 acres), making it one of the largest provincial parks in British Columbia. Hunting, camping, fishing, hiking, wildlife viewing and nature studying are some of the activities available in Mount Edziza Provincial Park.

== Geology ==
=== Stratigraphy ===
The escarpment is subdivided into at least six geological formations, each being the product of a distinct period of volcanic activity. These periods of volcanic activity occurred during four of the five magmatic cycles of the Mount Edziza volcanic complex. The two oldest geological formations comprising the Mess Creek Escarpment are the Raspberry and Armadillo formations, which were deposited by volcanic eruptions during the first magmatic cycle between 7.5 and six million years ago. Overlying these two geological formations are the Nido and Spectrum formations; they were deposited between six and three million years ago during the second magmatic cycle. Volcanism during the third magmatic cycle about one million years ago created the Ice Peak Formation, which overlies the Nido Formation. The youngest geological formation comprising the Mess Creek Escarpment is the Big Raven Formation; it was deposited during the fifth magmatic cycle in the last 20,000 years.

==== Raspberry Formation ====
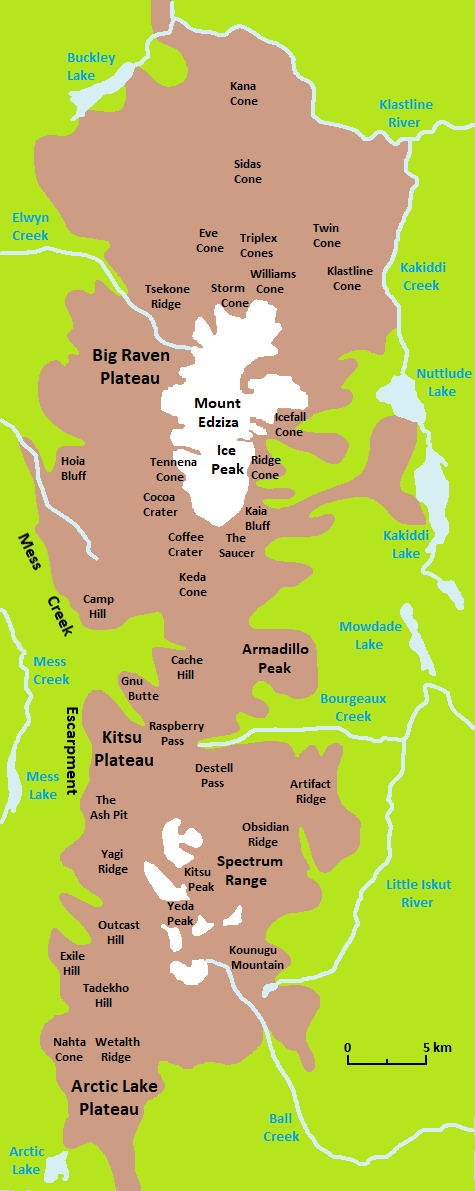
Map of the Mount Edziza volcanic complex showing the location of the Mess Creek Escarpment

The Raspberry Formation consists of flat-lying basaltic lava flows interbedded with scoria. It is exposed along the base of the Mess Creek Escarpment where it has an elevation of less than 1,310 m (4,300 ft). More than 180 m (590 ft) of Raspberry lava flows are exposed in the Mess Creek Escarpment, most of which were erupted from a shield volcano that formed on a Late Miocene erosion surface. These lava flows travelled westward into the ancestral valley of Mess Creek and originated from vents north of Raspberry Pass, which were subsequently buried under younger volcanic deposits. A minimum age for the timing of Raspberry volcanism is 7.4–6.2 million years.

==== Armadillo Formation ====
Basaltic lava flows of the 6.3-million-year-old Armadillo Formation are interbedded with air-fall pumice and ash flows of trachytic and comenditic compositions. They were highly fluid and mobile at the time of their eruption, as evidenced by their extreme persistence and relatively narrow thicknesses; individual basalt flows of this geological formation are less than 3 m (9.8 ft) thick. The source of these lava flows was probably a cluster of vents further to the north called Sezill Volcano, which may have been active prior to the onset of Armadillo volcanism. In contrast, the air-fall pumice and ash flows probably originated from the more than 4 km (2.5 mi) in diameter Armadillo Caldera east of the Mess Creek Escarpment.

==== Nido Formation ====
The 4.4-million-year-old Nido Formation consists of two stratigraphic units, both of which are exposed along the Mess Creek Escarpment and overlie the Raspberry and Armadillo formations. Alkali basalt of the Tenchen Member are exposed along the northern segment of the escarpment and comprise lava flows, flow breccia and agglutinate; the lava flows are brown-weathered and columnar-jointed. The Tenchen Member was erupted from at least three major volcanoes and several smaller satellitic centres, which have been either buried under younger volcanic deposits or destroyed by erosion. Alkali basalt of the Kounugu Member are exposed along the southern segment of the Mess Creek Escarpment and are in the form of lava flows, flow breccia and agglutinate. The Kounugu Member was erupted from at least four volcanoes which have also been deeply eroded and extensively buried under younger volcanic rocks.

==== Spectrum Formation ====
Overlying the Kounugu Member is the 3.1-million-year-old Spectrum Formation, which mainly occurs along the southern segment of the Mess Creek Escarpment. This geological formation largely consists of comendite, pantellerite and pantelleritic trachyte; all three volcanic rocks comprise lava domes, lava flows and minor breccia and ash flow deposits. Spectrum trachyte lava flows exposed along the upper part of the Mess Creek Escarpment are relatively thin compared to those forming the Spectrum Range to the southeast, but they are the most distal remnants of the main Spectrum Dome. These lava flows are overlain by alkali basalt of the Kitsu Member which is also exposed along the escarpment. This alkali basalt is in the form of lava flows; they likely originated from vents of the Spectrum Dome that have since been destroyed by erosion.

==== Ice Peak Formation ====
The approximately one-million-year-old Ice Peak Formation mainly occurs along the northern segment of the Mess Creek Escarpment where it overlies the Tenchen Member of the Nido Formation, as well as the older Armadillo and Raspberry formations. Most of the volcanic rocks comprising this geological formation were erupted from Ice Peak on the Big Raven Plateau, but the main Ice Peak Formation rock exposed along the escarpment is basalt from Camp Hill near the southwestern edge of the plateau. This basalt mainly erupted as subaerial lava flows, which are exposed along the Mess Creek Escarpment for about 8 km (5.0 mi) and are almost completely buried under colluvium deposits on the Big Raven Plateau. Just southwest of Camp Hill, the basalt is in the form of tuff breccia and pillow lava, which are probably the products of quenching in meltwater when Camp Hill initially erupted under glacial ice.

==== Big Raven Formation ====
The Big Raven Formation mainly occurs along the southern segment of the Mess Creek Escarpment where it overlies the Nido and Spectrum formations. This geological formation is the youngest and uppermost along the entire Mess Creek Escarpment, consisting of hawaiite and alkali basalt which erupted from three Holocene pyroclastic cones in the Mess Lake Lava Field. Alkali basaltic lava flows from the two oldest cones travelled westward on the Kitsu Plateau to the edge of the escarpment where they cooled into crude columnar joints. These lava flows most likely cascaded over the escarpment into the densely wooded valley of Mess Creek, but no evidence of this phenomenon has been found on or below the escarpment. Overlying the alkali basaltic lava flows and the Spectrum Formation is a 6.5 km (4.0 mi) long and 2.5 km (1.6 mi) wide hawaiitic air-fall tephra deposit, which also occurs along the edge of the Mess Creek Escarpment. The source of this tephra was The Ash Pit, which formed at the southern end of the Mess Creek Escarpment and produced a towering lava fountain.

=== Basement ===
As a part of the Mount Edziza volcanic complex, the Mess Creek Escarpment is underlain by the Stikinia terrane. This is a suite of Paleozoic and Mesozoic volcanic, sedimentary and metamorphic rocks that accreted to the continental margin of North America during the Jurassic. The rocks of this terrane are largely buried under landslide and colluvium deposits, as well as stream gravel, outwash and braided channel deposits. Minor exposures of Cretaceous–Paleocene sedimentary rocks assigned to the Sustut Group are present in the mouth of Nagha Creek valley at the southern end of the Mess Creek Escarpment and are in the form of conglomerates, sandstones, arkoses, siltstones, shales or minor coal.

== Accessibility ==
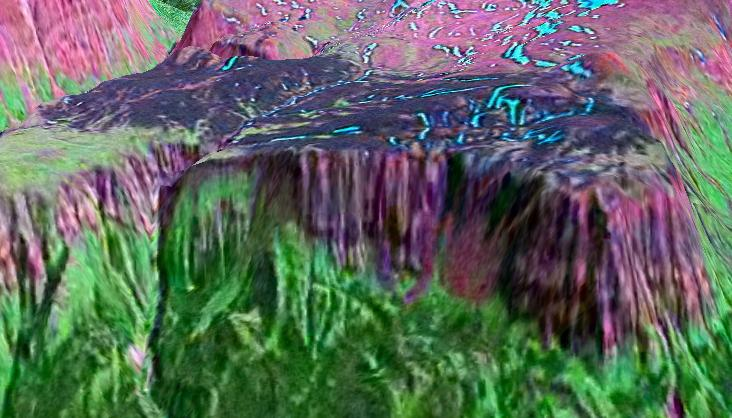
False colour image of the Kitsu Plateau with the Mess Creek Escarpment in the foreground

From near the Eastman Creek Rest Area south of Kinaskan Lake on the Stewart–Cassiar Highway, the historic Yukon Telegraph Trail extends about 15 km (9.3 mi) west to the Little Iskut River. From there, it enters Mount Edziza Provincial Park and continues another 15 km (9.3 mi) west along Bourgeaux Creek through Raspberry Pass. The telegraph trail then continues to the northwest through Raspberry Creek valley along the northern edge of the Kitsu Plateau for about 15 km (9.3 mi) to Mess Creek valley. Only short segments of the Yukon Telegraph Trail are still passable, having been mostly overgrown since maintenance of the trail ended in 1936.

The Mess Creek Escarpment can be accessed via charter aircraft from Dease Lake and Tatogga Lake, the latter of which is near the community of Iskut. Private aircraft are prohibited from landing on the neighbouring Kitsu Plateau lava flows. Mess Lake is large enough to be used by float-equipped aircraft, but landing on it with a private aircraft requires a letter of authorization from the BC Parks Stikine Senior Park Ranger. As of 2025, Alpine Lakes Air and BC Yukon Air are the only air charter companies permitted to provide access to this area via aircraft.

== See also ==
- List of escarpments
