= Kitsu Plateau =

Plateau in British Columbia, Canada

- Volcanic plateau
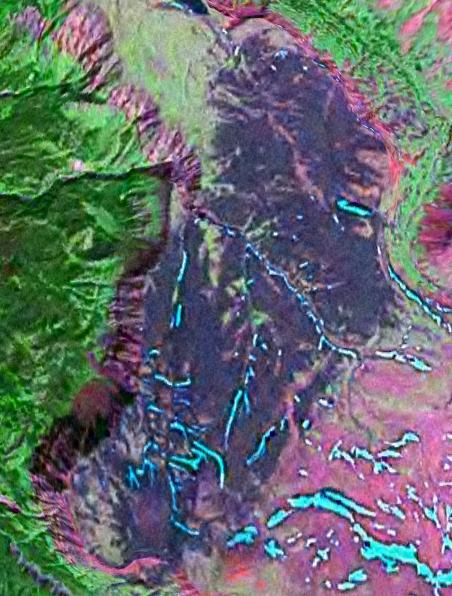
- False colour image of air-fall tephra on the Kitsu Plateau from The Ash Pit which is the circular depression at bottom left centre

- Location in British Columbia
- Location in Mount Edziza Provincial Park
- Coordinates: 57°27′N 130°45′W
- Location: British Columbia, Canada
- Range: Tahltan Highland
- Part of: Mount Edziza complex
- Age: 7.4 Ma to less than 20 ka
- Formed by: Volcanism
- Geology: Comendite, trachyte, hawaiite, alkali basalt
- Etymology: 'Northern lights' in Tahltan

Dimensions
  - Length: Approximately 10 km (6.2 mi)
  - Width: Approximately 6 km (3.7 mi)
- Elevation: Above 1,700 m (5,500 ft)
- Last eruption: Holocene age
- Topo map: NTS 104G10 Mount Edziza; NTS 104G7 Mess Lake
- Designation: Mount Edziza Provincial Park
- Borders on: Spectrum Range (southeast); Nagha Creek valley (south); Mess Creek valley (west); Raspberry Pass (north); Artifact Ridge (east)

The Kitsu Plateau is a small intermontane plateau in Cassiar Land District of northwestern British Columbia, Canada. It lies on the Tahltan Highland and is surrounded by several valleys, including those of Mess Creek, Nagha Creek and Raspberry Creek. The plateau is drained by many small streams that flow into these neighbouring valleys and, unlike the valleys, it is relatively barren of vegetation. Surrounding the Kitsu Plateau is Mount Edziza Provincial Park which is one of the largest provincial parks in British Columbia. Access to this remote plateau is mainly by aircraft since motorized vehicles are prohibited from entering Mount Edziza Provincial Park.

The Kitsu Plateau is volcanic in origin, consisting of lava flows that are interbedded with volcanic ejecta. These lava flows and the associated ejecta originated from several volcanoes of the Mount Edziza volcanic complex which has been the focus of volcanic activity over the last 7.5 million years. Alkali basalt, hawaiite and trachyte are among some of the volcanic rocks comprising the Kitsu Plateau which is subdivided into five geological formations, each being the product of a distinct period of volcanic activity. Volcanism on the plateau continued into the current Holocene epoch and created the Mess Lake Lava Field which contains small volcanic cones.

== Geography and geomorphology ==
=== Location ===
The Kitsu Plateau is on the Tahltan Highland east of the Boundary Ranges of the Coast Mountains and west of the Skeena Mountains in Cassiar Land District. Between the Boundary Ranges and the Kitsu Plateau is Mess Creek valley, which extends more than 30 kilometres (19 miles) to the north where it separates the Zagoddetchino massif from the Big Raven Plateau in the east. The northern end of the plateau is bounded by Raspberry Pass which contains the east-flowing Bourgeaux Creek in the east and the northwest-flowing Raspberry Creek in the west. Between the Kitsu Plateau and the Skeena Mountains is Artifact Ridge and the Little Iskut River, the latter of which flows north in a north–south trending valley and then flows southeast towards the Skeena Mountains into the Iskut River. In the southeast, the Kitsu Plateau is bounded by the Spectrum Range whereas in the south the plateau is separated from Yagi Ridge by Nagha Creek valley.

Roughly 10 km (6.2 mi) long and 6 km (3.7 mi) wide, the plateau lies at the southern end of the Mount Edziza volcanic complex, which also includes the Big Raven Plateau to the north as well as the Spectrum Range and the Arctic Lake Plateau to the south. The volcanic complex consists of a group of overlapping shield volcanoes, stratovolcanoes, lava domes and cinder cones that have formed over the last 7.5 million years. It contains four central volcanoes along its north–south trending axis; from north to south they are Mount Edziza, Ice Peak, Armadillo Peak and the Spectrum Range.

=== Drainage ===
As a part of the Mount Edziza volcanic complex, the Kitsu Plateau is drained entirely by streams within the Stikine River watershed. The only named stream on the plateau is Kitsu Creek, which originates on the northern flank of Kitsu Peak in the Spectrum Range and flows northwest then north into Mess Creek, a tributary of the Stikine River. Several small unnamed streams flow into Kitsu Creek and the neighbouring valleys of Mess, Raspberry and Nagha creeks; Raspberry Creek drains into Mess Creek whereas Nagha Creek drains into Kitsu Creek just northeast of Mess Lake.

=== Structure ===
The western, northern and southern edges of the Kitsu Plateau are marked by steep cliffs forming the Mess Creek Escarpment, the southern side of Raspberry Creek valley and the northern side of Nagha Creek valley, respectively. At the Mess Creek Escarpment, the Kitsu Plateau rises more than 910 metres (3,000 feet) above Mess Lake in Mess Creek valley; Mess Lake has an elevation below 760 m (2,500 ft) whereas the Mess Creek Escarpment reaches an elevation of more than 1,700 m (5,500 ft). The plateau surface is barren of vegetation, but at lower elevations the surrounding valleys contain white spruce, lodgepole pine and trembling aspen forests.

=== Landforms ===
The Kitsu Plateau is dominated by the Mess Lake Lava Field, which extends from Raspberry Creek in the north to Nagha Creek in the south. It covers an area of around 18 square kilometres (6.9 square miles) and contains three pyroclastic cones which were the sources of lava flows that travelled westward towards the Mess Creek Escarpment. The oldest cone, sometimes referred to as ML-1, is at the northern end of the lava field, whereas the second oldest cone, ML-2, is at the southern end of the lava field. Both cones are covered by tundra vegetation and have been slightly rounded by erosion, although their craters are still recognizable. The Ash Pit, sometimes referred to by the numeronym ML-3, is the youngest and southernmost eruptive centre of the Mess Lake Lava Field. It lies on the steep southern slope of the Kitsu Plateau inside Nagha Creek valley and has been described as a pyroclastic cone or a conical explosion crater.

== Geology ==
=== Stratigraphy ===
The Kitsu Plateau is subdivided into at least five geological formations, each being the product of a distinct period of volcanic activity. These periods of volcanic activity occurred during three magmatic cycles of the Mount Edziza volcanic complex; each cycle began with the effusion of alkali basalt and culminated with the eruption of lesser volumes of felsic magma. The two oldest geological formations comprising the Kitsu Plateau are the Raspberry and Armadillo formations, which were deposited by volcanic eruptions during the first magmatic cycle between 7.5 and 6 million years ago. Overlying these two geological formations are the Nido and Spectrum formations, which were deposited between 6 and 3 million years ago during the second magmatic cycle. The fifth oldest geological formation comprising the Kitsu Plateau is the Big Raven Formation, which was deposited during the fifth magmatic cycle in the last 20,000 years.

==== Raspberry Formation ====
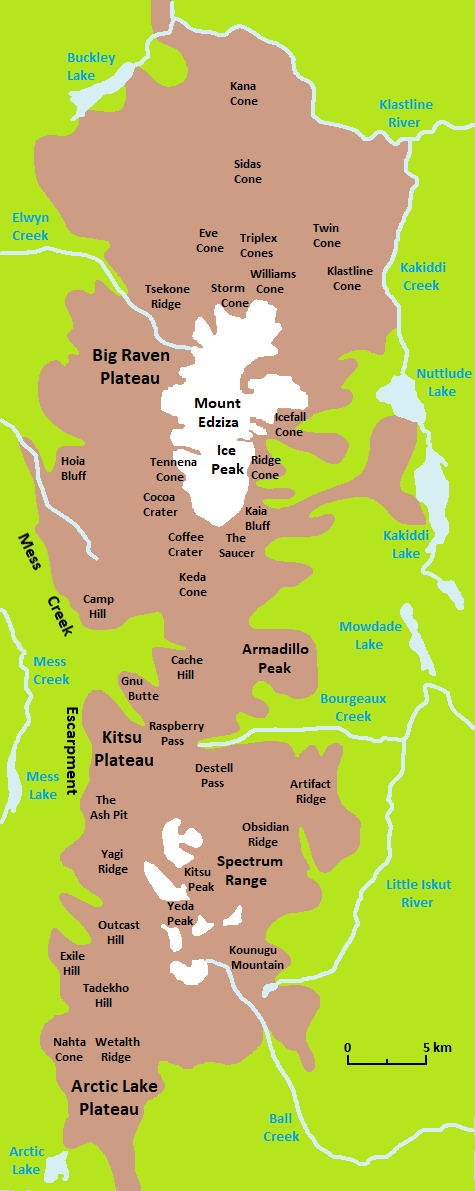
Map of the Mount Edziza volcanic complex showing the location of the Kitsu Plateau

The Raspberry Formation is exposed on the lower northern, western and southwestern sides of the Kitsu Plateau. It has an elevation of less than 1,310 m (4,300 ft) along the Mess Creek Escarpment and consists of flat-lying basaltic lava flows interbedded with scoria. More than 180 m (590 ft) of Raspberry lava flows are exposed in the Mess Creek Escarpment, most of which were erupted from a shield volcano that formed on a Late Miocene erosion surface. These lava flows travelled westward into the ancestral valley of Mess Creek and originated from vents north of Raspberry Pass which were subsequently buried under younger volcanic deposits. A minimum age for the timing of Raspberry volcanism is 7.4–6.2 million years.

==== Armadillo Formation ====
Basaltic lava flows of the 6.3-million-year-old Armadillo Formation are exposed on the northern side of the plateau and along the Mess Creek Escarpment on the western side of the plateau where they overlie basaltic lava flows of the Raspberry Formation. Armadillo basalt flows are interbedded with air-fall pumice and ash flows of trachytic and comenditic compositions. They were highly fluid and mobile at the time of their eruption as evidenced by their extreme persistence and relatively narrow thicknesses; individual basalt flows of this geological formation are less than 3 m (9.8 ft) thick. The source of these flows was probably a cluster of vents further to the north called Sezill Volcano which may have been active prior to the onset of Armadillo volcanism. In contrast, the interbedded air-fall pumice and ash flows probably originated from the more than 4 km (2.5 mi) in diameter Armadillo Peak caldera northeast of the Kitsu Plateau.

==== Nido Formation ====
Overlying the Armadillo Formation is the Kounugu Member, which is the only stratigraphic unit of the Nido Formation comprising the Kitsu Plateau. It consists of basaltic lava flows, flow breccia and agglutinate which were erupted 4.4 million years ago from at least four eruptive centres; these eruptive centres have since been deeply eroded and buried under younger volcanic deposits. At least some of the Kounugu lava flows comprising the Kitsu Plateau may have originated from Swarm Peak further to the east, which issued lava that travelled westward; remains of the Swarm Peak eruptive centre are in the form of north-trending fissure swarms. Lava from the Swarm Peak eruptive centre is exposed along the Mess Creek Escarpment where it overlies till and glacial-fluvial gravel derived from the Armadillo Formation.

==== Spectrum Formation ====
The Kounugu Member is overlain by the 3.1-million-year-old Spectrum Formation, which is exposed along the Mess Creek Escarpment on the western side of the plateau and at the southern and eastern ends of the plateau. This geological formation largely consists of comendite, pantellerite and pantelleritic trachyte; all three volcanic rocks comprise lava domes, lava flows and minor breccia and ash flow deposits. Spectrum trachyte flows on the Kitsu Plateau are the most distal remnants of the main Spectrum Dome and are relatively thin compared to those forming the adjacent Spectrum Range. These trachyte flows are overlain by alkali basalt of the Kitsu Member, which is mainly exposed at the southern end of the Kitsu Plateau and along the western edge of the plateau. This alkali basalt is in the form of lava flows and likely originated from vents of the Spectrum Dome which have since been destroyed by erosion.

==== Big Raven Formation ====
The Big Raven Formation is the youngest and uppermost geological formation comprising the Kitsu Plateau, consisting of hawaiite and alkali basalt in the form of lava flows, lava bombs, agglutinate and air-fall tephra. These volcanic rocks were deposited by eruptions during the Holocene and mainly comprise the Mess Lake Lava Field, one of the three Big Raven lava fields of the Mount Edziza volcanic complex. Alkali basalt flows from the two oldest pyroclastic cones in the Mess Lake Lava Field, ML-1 and ML-2, most likely cascaded over the Mess Creek Escarpment into Mess Creek valley, but no evidence of this phenomenon has been found on or below the escarpment. The Ash Pit, which may be the youngest eruptive centre of the entire Mount Edziza volcanic complex, was the source of a 6.5 km (4.0 mi) long and 2.5 km (1.6 mi) wide hawaiitic air-fall tephra deposit that extends to the north-northeast on the Kitsu Plateau. It was also the source of a hawaiitic lava flow that travelled 3.5 km (2.2 mi) to the northwest through Nagha Creek valley towards Mess Lake. Residual heat from The Ash Pit eruption may have resulted in the formation of the Mess Lake Hot Springs 2.5 km (1.6 mi) to the west in Mess Creek valley.

=== Basement ===
As a part of the Mount Edziza volcanic complex, the Kitsu Plateau is underlain by the Stikinia terrane. This is a suite of Paleozoic and Mesozoic volcanic, sedimentary and metamorphic rocks that accreted (Note: Accretion is the process by which terranes are added to a continent, resulting in continental growth.) to the continental margin of North America during the Jurassic. The rocks of this terrane are exposed to the south and southwest where they are largely buried under landslide and colluvium deposits, as well as stream gravel, outwash and braided channel deposits. Minor exposures of Cretaceous–Paleocene sedimentary rocks assigned to the Sustut Group are present in the mouth of Nagha Creek valley at the southwestern end of the Kitsu Plateau and are in the form of conglomerates, sandstones, arkoses, siltstones, shales or minor coal.

== Name and etymology ==
The Kitsu Plateau was officially named on January 2, 1980. Its name was adopted on the National Topographic System map 104G/10 after being submitted to the BC Geographical Names office by the Geological Survey of Canada. Kitsu means 'northern lights' in the Tahltan language and was likely chosen due to the plateau's association with Kitsu Creek and Kitsu Peak, whose names were also adopted on January 2, 1980, on the National Topographic System maps 104G/10 and 104G/7, respectively.

== Provincial park ==
The Kitsu Plateau lies at the southern end of Mount Edziza Provincial Park, a protected area founded in 1972 to preserve the volcanic landscape. This remote wilderness area of northwestern British Columbia is not accessible by motorized vehicles to help protect the very sensitive environment. Instead, access is mainly via aircraft or unmaintained hiking trails that cross creeks. Mount Edziza Provincial Park covers 266,180 hectares (657,700 acres), making it one of the largest provincial parks in British Columbia. Hunting, camping, fishing, hiking, wildlife viewing and nature studying are some of the activities available in Mount Edziza Provincial Park.

Wildlife in the area includes western moose, boreal woodland caribou, mountain goats, stone sheep, wolves, bears, squirrels, owls, ptarmigans, ravens, gyrfalcons, grouse and migratory songbirds. The climate is characterized by warm summers and cold, snowy winters; temperatures are warmest in mid-summer during the day when they may hit the 30 degrees Celsius (86 degrees Fahrenheit) range. However, temperatures can drop below freezing during summer nights, making snow or freezing rain a possibility at any time of the year.

== Accessibility ==
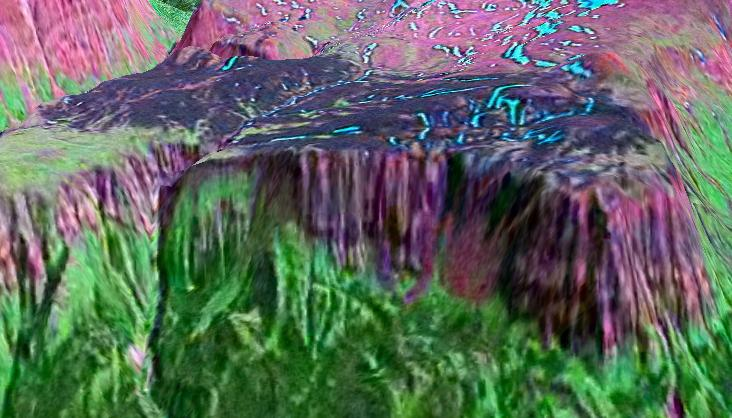
False colour image of the Kitsu Plateau with the Mess Creek Escarpment in the foreground

From near the Eastman Creek Rest Area south of Kinaskan Lake on the Stewart–Cassiar Highway, the historic Yukon Telegraph Trail extends about 15 km (9.3 mi) west to the Little Iskut River. From there, it enters Mount Edziza Provincial Park and continues another 15 km (9.3 mi) west along Bourgeaux Creek through Raspberry Pass. The telegraph trail then continues to the northwest through Raspberry Creek valley along the northern edge of the Kitsu Plateau for about 15 km (9.3 mi) to Mess Creek valley. Only short segments of the Yukon Telegraph Trail are still passable, having been mostly overgrown since maintenance of the trail ended in 1936.

The Kitsu Plateau can be accessed via charter aircraft from Dease Lake and Tatogga Lake, the latter of which is near the community of Iskut. Private aircraft are prohibited from landing on the Kitsu Plateau lava flows, but Mess Lake is large enough to be used by float-equipped aircraft. Landing on the lake with a private aircraft requires a letter of authorization from the BC Parks Stikine Senior Park Ranger.

== See also ==
- List of plateaus in British Columbia
