= Kitsu =

Kitsu can refer to:

- Kitsu Creek, a creek in British Columbia, Canada
- Kitsu Peak, a mountain peak in British Columbia, Canada
- Kitsu Plateau, a plateau in British Columbia, Canada
