= Gerlib Creek =

Tributary river in the country of Canada

- Mouth of Gerlib Creek

Location
- Country: Canada
- Province: British Columbia
- District: Cassiar Land District

Physical characteristics
- Source: North side of Tadeda Peak
  - location: Tahltan Highland
  - coordinates: 57°33′11″N 130°36′14″W
  - elevation: 2,000 m (6,600 ft)
- Mouth: Bourgeaux Creek
  - coordinates: 57°30′41″N 130°30′33″W
  - elevation: 1,010 m (3,310 ft)
- Length: 10.5 km (6.5 mi)
- Basin size: 24.4 km^{2} (9.4 sq mi)
- Discharge
  - average: 0.938 m^{3}/s (33.1 cu ft/s)

Basin features
- Topo map: NTS 104G10 Mount Edziza

Gerlib Creek is a tributary of Bourgeaux Creek and part of the Stikine River watershed in northwest part of the province of British Columbia, Canada. It flows generally east and south for roughly 10.5 km (6.5 mi) to join the Bourgeaux Creek, a tributary of the Little Iskut River, which in turn is a tributary of the Iskut River, the largest tributary of the Stikine River.

Gerlib Creek's mean annual discharge is estimated at 0.938 m^{3}/s (33.1 cu ft/s). Its watershed covers 24.4 km^{2} (9.4 sq mi) and is entirely in Mount Edziza Provincial Park. The watershed's land cover is classified as 50.4% barren, 22.0% conifer forest, 10.8% shrubland, 9.5% herbaceous, 6.9% snow/glacier, and small amounts of other cover.

The mouth of Gerlib Creek is located about 60 km (37 mi) southeast of Telegraph Creek, British Columbia, about 105 km (65 mi) south of Dease Lake, British Columbia, and about 250 km (160 mi) southeast of Juneau, Alaska.

Gerlib Creek is in Mount Edziza Provincial Park, which lies within the traditional territory of the Tahltan First Nation, of the Tahltan people.

Gerlib Creek is named after Robert Gerlib, a student who worked with Canadian volcanologist Jack Souther at the Mount Edziza volcanic complex in 1958. Gerlib was killed in a mining accident the following year.

== Geography ==
Gerlib Creek originates on the north side of Tadeda Peak, about 18 km (11 mi) south of Mount Edziza. From its source, Gerlib Creek flows east between Armadillo Peak to the south and Esja Peak to the north. Then it turns south, flowing by Hoyaa Peak before emptying into Bourgeaux Creek.

== See also ==
- List of rivers of British Columbia
