= Artifact Ridge =

Mountain ridge in the country of Canada

- Location within British Columbia

Highest point
- Elevation: 2,086 m (6,844 ft)
- Coordinates: 57°27′54.61″N 130°32′50.31″W

Geography
- Country: Canada
- Province: British Columbia
- District: Cassiar Land District
- Parent range: Tahltan Highland
- Topo map: NTS 104G7 Mess Lake

Artifact Ridge is a mountain ridge extending southeast from the eastern side of the Mount Edziza volcanic complex in northwestern British Columbia, Canada. It is bounded on the north by Bourgeaux Creek valley, on the south by Artifact Creek valley, on the east by the Little Iskut River valley and on the west by the Kitsu Plateau. The ridge is at the southeastern end of Mount Edziza Provincial Park and gets its name from the knapping of obsidian tools and points by early Tahltan hunters. Destell Pass cuts north–south through the westernmost end of Artifact Ridge.

== Geology ==
The base of Artifact Ridge is covered with glacial, talus and landslide deposits. The oldest exposed rocks are of Mesozoic or Paleozoic age and are overlain by Miocene alkali basalt flows of the Raspberry Formation. The Raspberry rocks are overlain by quenched, hydrothermally altered and highly fractured Miocene trachybasalt which comprise the lower subaqueous facies of the Little Iskut Formation. Overlying these rocks are Miocene trachybasaltic lava flows and flow breccia comprising the upper subaerial facies of the Little Iskut Formation.

The Little Iskut rocks are overlain by Miocene comendite or trachyte lava flows and domes of the Armadillo Formation which are in turn overlain by Pliocene alkali basalt of the Kounugu Member of the Nido Formation. The youngest and uppermost rocks comprising Artifact Ridge are Pliocene alkali basalt flows of the Kitsu Member of the Spectrum Formation which are interbedded with fluvial gravel and paleosols.

== See also ==
- Volcanism of the Mount Edziza volcanic complex
