= Little Iskut =

Little Iskut may refer to:

- Little Iskut Formation, a geological formation in British Columbia, Canada
- Little Iskut River, a river in British Columbia, Canada
