= Little Iskut Formation =

Geological formation in British Columbia

- Stratigraphic range: 7.2 Ma
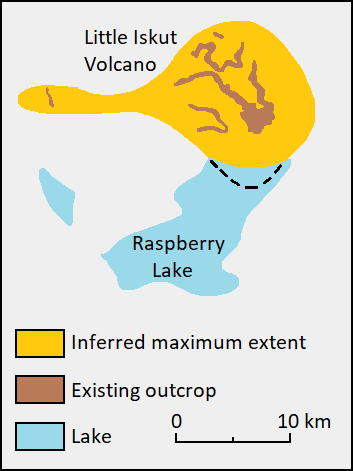
- Paleogeological map of the Little Iskut Formation at the end of the Little Iskut eruptive period
- Type: Geological formation
- Unit of: Mount Edziza volcanic complex
- Sub-units: Upper Little Iskut; Lower Little Iskut
- Underlies: Armadillo Formation; Nido Formation
- Overlies: Raspberry Formation

Lithology
- Primary: Trachybasalt

Location
- Coordinates: 57.5°N 130.6°W
- Region: British Columbia
- Country: Canada

Type section
- Named for: Little Iskut River
- Named by: Souther et al.
- Year defined: 1984

The Little Iskut Formation is a stratigraphic unit of Miocene age in northwestern British Columbia, Canada.

== Naming ==
The Little Iskut Formation takes its name from the Little Iskut River, a tributary of the Iskut River which flows southeast from the southern end of the Mount Edziza volcanic complex.

== Geology ==
The Little Iskut Formation has a volume of 14.6 km^{3} (3.5 cu mi), making it the seventh most voluminous geological formation comprising the Mount Edziza volcanic complex. It occurs at the northeastern end of the Spectrum Range where it covers a roughly 10-kilometre-wide (6.2-mile) area. A small portion of the Little Iskut Formation is exposed in the Mess Creek Escarpment to the west.

The Little Iskut Formation consists of trachybasalt flows and breccia. It ranges in thickness from 90 m (300 ft) on Stewpot Ridge to about 300 m (980 ft) near the middle of Artifact Ridge. The Little Iskut Formation originally formed a small symmetrical shield volcano during the Miocene.

The Little Iskut Formation conformably overlies the Raspberry Formation south of Bourgeaux Creek. Little Iskut trachybasalt is overlain by rhyolite of the Armadillo Formation and basalt of the Nido Formation. Two subunits comprise the Little Iskut Formation; the upper unit consists entirely of trachybasalt lava flows while the lower unit consists of abundant breccia.

K–Ar dating has yielded an age of 7.2 ± 0.3 million years for Little Iskut trachybasalt.

== See also ==
- Volcanism of the Mount Edziza volcanic complex
