= Raspberry Formation =

Geological formation in British Columbia

- Stratigraphic range: 11.4–5.5 Ma
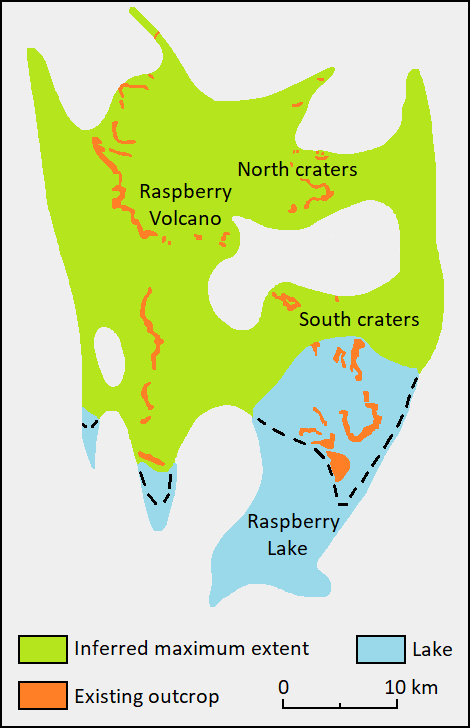
- Paleogeological map of the Raspberry Formation at the end of the Raspberry eruptive period
- Type: Geological formation
- Unit of: Mount Edziza volcanic complex
- Underlies: Little Iskut Formation; Armadillo Formation
- Overlies: Stikinia

Lithology
- Primary: Alkali basalt, hawaiite

Location
- Coordinates: 57.5°N 130.6°W
- Region: British Columbia
- Country: Canada

Type section
- Named for: Raspberry Pass
- Named by: Souther et al., 1984

The Raspberry Formation is a stratigraphic unit of Miocene age in northwestern British Columbia, Canada.

== Name ==
The Raspberry Formation takes its name from Raspberry Pass, a mountain pass cutting through the central portion of the Mount Edziza volcanic complex.

== Geology ==
The Raspberry Formation has a volume of 119 km^{3} (29 cu mi), making it the third most voluminous geological formation comprising the Mount Edziza volcanic complex. It varies in elevation from less than 1,310 m (4,300 ft) along the Mess Creek Escarpment to 1,740 m (5,710 ft) near Armadillo Peak.

The Raspberry Formation is overlain conformably by the Little Iskut Formation. An erosion surface separates the Raspberry Formation from the overlying Armadillo Formation and younger geological formations. Rocks of the Stikinia terrane underlie the Raspberry Formation.

The Raspberry Formation consists of flat-lying alkali basalt and hawaiite flows. These flows are rusty brown and are interbedded with reddish-brown to yellow or orange scoria. The Raspberry Formation represents three overlapping Miocene shield volcanoes.

K–Ar dating has yielded ages of 11.4 ± 1.5 million years, 8.4 ± 0.4 million years and 6.4 ± 0.3 million years for Raspberry hawaiite and 6.1 ± 0.4 million years and 5.5 ± 0.1 million years for Raspberry alkali basalt.

== See also ==
- Volcanism of the Mount Edziza volcanic complex
