= Destell Pass =

Mountain pass in British Columbia, Canada

- Location within British Columbia
- Elevation: 1,622 metres (5,322 ft)

Third Approach
- Location: British Columbia, Canada
- Range: Tahltan Highland
- Coordinates: 57°28′59″N 130°38′06″W
- Topo map: NTS 104G7 Mess Lake

Destell Pass, sometimes incorrectly spelled Destall Pass, is a mountain pass in the Tahltan Highland of northwestern British Columbia, Canada. It is located southeast of Telegraph Creek and northwest of Artifact Ridge at the southeastern end of Mount Edziza Provincial Park. Destell Pass has an elevation of 1,622 m (5,322 ft) and consists of a narrow rock cleft. Edziza obsidian of the Armadillo Formation occurs at Destell Pass.

This remote mountain pass in Cassiar Land District provides access between the broad upland valleys of Raspberry Creek and Artifact Creek. Its name means "going to camp" in the Tahltan language, referring to the fact that the pass was once used by the Tahltan to gain access to hunting grounds in the Raspberry and Artifact creek valleys.

== See also ==
- Raspberry Pass
