= Kitsu Creek =

Tribuatary river in the country of Canada

- Mouth of Kitsu Creek

Location
- Country: Canada
- Province: British Columbia
- District: Cassiar Land District

Physical characteristics
- Source: Kitsu Peak
  - location: Spectrum Range
  - coordinates: 57°26′15″N 130°42′27″W
  - elevation: 2,105 m (6,906 ft)
- Mouth: Mess Creek
  - coordinates: 57°30′56″N 130°51′40″W
  - elevation: 668 m (2,192 ft)
- Length: 22.5 km (14.0 mi)
- Basin size: 72.6 km^{2} (28.0 sq mi)
- Discharge
  - average: 2.19 m^{3}/s (77 cu ft/s)

Basin features
- Topo map: NTS 104G10 Mount Edziza

Kitsu Creek is a tributary of Mess Creek and part of the Stikine River watershed in northwest part of the province of British Columbia, Canada. It flows generally northwest and north for roughly 22.5 km (14.0 mi) to join Mess Creek, a tributary of the Stikine River.

Kitsu Creek's mean annual discharge is estimated at 2.19 m^{3}/s (77 cu ft/s). Its watershed covers 72.6 km^{2} (28.0 sq mi) and is entirely in Mount Edziza Provincial Park. The watershed's land cover is classified as 42.5% barren, 28.7% conifer forest, 11.4% shrubland, 11.0% snow/glacier, 5.7% herbaceous, and small amounts of other cover.

The mouth of Kitsu Creek is located about 47 km (29 mi) south of Telegraph Creek, British Columbia, about 115 km (71 mi) southwest of Dease Lake, British Columbia, and about 228 km (142 mi) southeast of Juneau, Alaska.

Kitsu Creek is in Mount Edziza Provincial Park, which lies within the traditional territory of the Tahltan First Nation, of the Tahltan people.

Kitsu Creek was named in association with Kitsu Peak and Kitsu Plateau. The name comes from a Tahltan word for the Northern Lights.

== Geography ==
Kitsu Creek originates on the north side of Kitsu Peak in the Spectrum Range about 30 km (19 mi) south of Mount Edziza. It flows northwest on the Kitsu Plateau, cascades down the Mess Creek Escarpment and then flows north to Mess Creek just north of Mess Lake. It is joined from the south by its one named tributary, Nagha Creek. Kitsu Creek's watershed is in the southern part of the Mount Edziza volcanic complex.

== See also ==
- List of rivers of British Columbia
