= Armadillo Formation =

Geological formation in British Columbia

- Stratigraphic range: 6.9–6.1 Ma
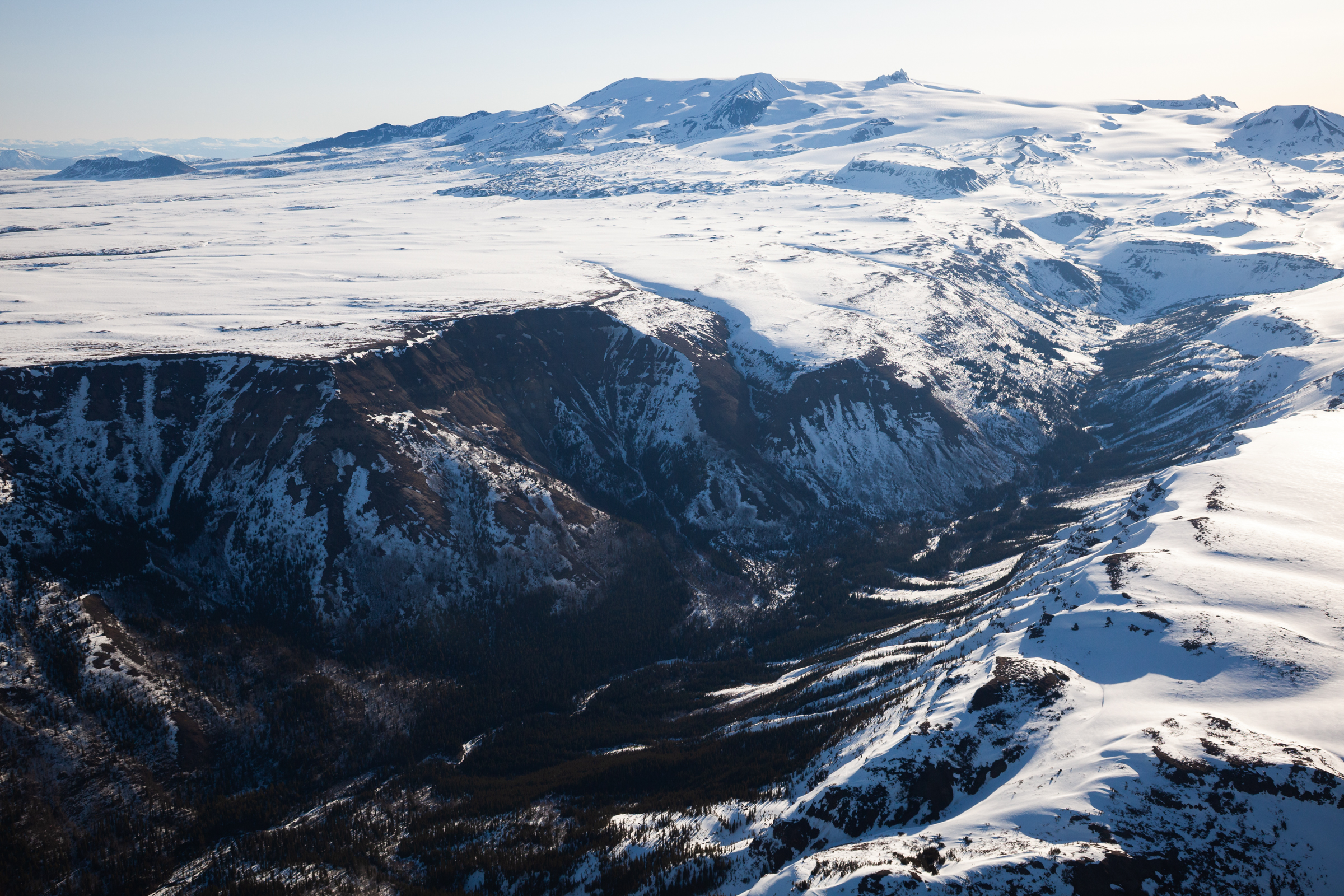
- Basaltic lava flows of the Armadillo Formation are exposed in Sezill Creek valley
- Type: Geological formation
- Unit of: Mount Edziza volcanic complex
- Underlies: Ice Peak Formation, Spectrum Formation, Big Raven Formation, Nido Formation
- Overlies: Little Iskut Formation, Raspberry Formation

Lithology
- Primary: Alkali basalt, comendite, trachyte

Location
- Coordinates: 57.5°N 130.6°W
- Region: British Columbia
- Country: Canada

Type section
- Named for: Armadillo Peak
- Named by: Souther et al.
- Year defined: 1984
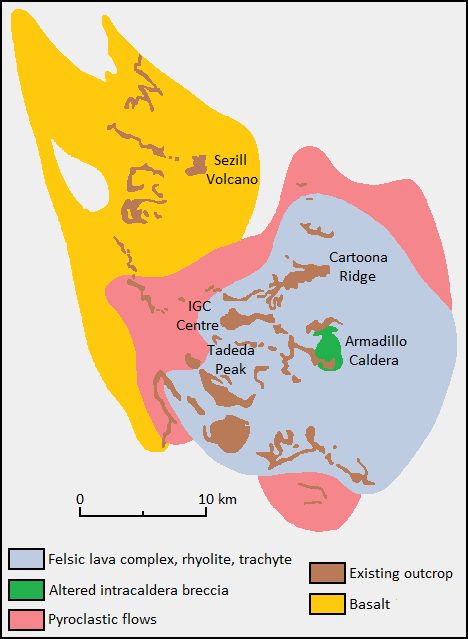
- Paleogeological map showing the inferred maximum extent of the Armadillo Formation at the end of the Armadillo eruptive period

The Armadillo Formation is a stratigraphic unit of Miocene age in northwestern British Columbia, Canada.

== Name ==
The Armadillo Formation takes its name from Armadillo Peak, a volcanic peak east of Raspberry Pass in the middle of the Mount Edziza volcanic complex.

== Geology ==
The Armadillo Formation has a volume of 159 km^{3} (38 cu mi), making it the most voluminous of the 13 geological formations comprising the Mount Edziza volcanic complex. It conformably overlies the Little Iskut Formation, as well as the Raspberry Formation. It is overlain by the Ice Peak Formation, Nido Formation, Spectrum Formation and Big Raven Formation.

The Armadillo Formation consists of volcanic rocks of both felsic and mafic compositions. They are the products of a long period of bimodal volcanism, having issued from multiple eruptive centres. The felsic rocks include trachyte and comenditic rhyolite which form pyroclastic deposits, lava domes and lava flows. Basalt is the main mafic rock of the Armadillo Formation and forms lava flows.

K–Ar dating of the Armadillo Formation has yielded ages of 10.2 ± 1.4 million years for comendite, 6.9 ± 0.3 million years and 6.1 ± 0.1 million years for comenditic ash flows, 6.9 ± 0.3 million years for comenditic glass and 6.5 ± 0.2 million years, 6.3 ± 0.5 million years, 6.2 ± 0.1 million years and 6.1 ± 0.2 million years for hawaiite. The first age is anomalously old and most likely results from excessive atmospheric argon.

== See also ==
- Volcanism of the Mount Edziza volcanic complex
