= The Ash Pit =

Inactive volcanic crater in Canada

Highest point
- Elevation: 1,580 m (5,180 ft)
- Coordinates: 57.45°N 130.78°W

Geography
- Location: British Columbia, Canada
- Parent range: Tahltan Highland

Geology
- Rock age: Holocene
- Mountain type: Volcanic crater
- Volcanic field: Mess Lake Lava Field
- Last eruption: Holocene

The Ash Pit is an inactive volcanic crater on the southern edge of the Kitsu Plateau in British Columbia, Canada. It is Holocene in age and may be the youngest feature of the Mount Edziza volcanic complex. It is within the Northern Cordilleran Volcanic Province and is part of the Pacific Ring of Fire, that includes over 160 active volcanoes.

== See also ==
- List of volcanoes in Canada
- List of Northern Cordilleran volcanoes
- Volcanism of Canada
- Volcanism of Western Canada
- Volcanic history of the Northern Cordilleran Volcanic Province
