= Tadeda Peak =

Volcanic peak in the country of Canada

- Location within British Columbia

Highest point
- Elevation: 2,194 m (7,198 ft)
- Prominence: 219 m (719 ft)
- Listing: List of volcanoes in Canada
- Coordinates: 57°32′31.9″N 130°36′58.0″W

Geography
- Location: British Columbia, Canada
- District: Cassiar Land District
- Parent range: Tahltan Highland
- Topo map: NTS 104G10 Mount Edziza

Geology
- Rock age: Miocene
- Mountain type: Lava dome
- Volcanic zone: Northern Cordilleran Volcanic Province
- Last eruption: Miocene

Tadeda Peak, also known unofficially as Tadeda Centre, is a volcanic peak in northern British Columbia, Canada, located just northeast of Raspberry Pass in Mount Edziza Provincial Park.

== See also ==
- List of volcanoes in Canada
- List of Northern Cordilleran volcanoes
- Mount Edziza volcanic complex
- Volcanism of Canada
- Volcanism of Western Canada
