= Sustut Group =

- Stratigraphic range: Cretaceous
- Type: Group

Location
- Region: British Columbia
- Country: Canada

The Sustut Group is a geologic group in British Columbia, Canada. It preserves fossils dating back to the Cretaceous period. The leptoceratopsid Ferrisaurus and the turtle Basilemys have been recovered from the group.

== See also ==
- List of fossiliferous stratigraphic units in British Columbia
