= Bourgeaux Creek =

Tributary river in the country of Canada

- Mouth of Bourgeaux Creek

Location
- Country: Canada
- Province: British Columbia
- District: Cassiar Land District

Physical characteristics
- Source: East side of Raspberry Pass
  - location: Tahltan Highland
  - coordinates: 57°29′57″N 130°40′27″W
  - elevation: 1,475 m (4,839 ft)
- Mouth: Little Iskut River
  - coordinates: 57°30′13″N 130°26′48″W
  - elevation: 850 m (2,790 ft)
- Length: 17 km (11 mi)
- Basin size: 104 km^{2} (40 sq mi)
- Discharge
  - average: 3.46 m^{3}/s (122 cu ft/s)

Basin features
- Topo map: NTS 104G10 Mount Edziza

Bourgeaux Creek is a tributary of the Little Iskut River and part of the Stikine River watershed in northwest part of the province of British Columbia, Canada. It flows generally east for roughly 17 km (11 mi) to join the Little Iskut River, a tributary of the Iskut River, which in turn is the largest tributary of the Stikine River. Gerlib Creek joins Bourgeaux Creek about 5 km (3.1 mi) upstream of Bourgeaux's confluence with the Little Iskut River.

Bourgeaux Creek's mean annual discharge is estimated at 3.46 m^{3}/s (122 cu ft/s). Its watershed covers 104 km^{2} (40 sq mi) and is entirely in Mount Edziza Provincial Park. The watershed's land cover is classified as 37.7% barren, 29.0% conifer forest, 14.8% shrubland, 13.0% herbaceous, 4.6% snow/glacier, and small amounts of other cover.

The mouth of Bourgeaux Creek is located about 60 km (37 mi) southeast of Telegraph Creek, British Columbia, about 110 km (68 mi) south of Dease Lake, British Columbia, and about 250 km (160 mi) southeast of Juneau, Alaska.

Bourgeaux Creek is in Mount Edziza Provincial Park, which lies within the traditional territory of the Tahltan First Nation, of the Tahltan people.

== Geography ==
Bourgeaux Creek originates on the east side of Raspberry Pass, about 25 km (16 mi) south of Mount Edziza. Raspberry Pass forms a boundary between the Spectrum Range to the south and the Mount Edziza area to the north. From its source, Bourgeaux Creek flows east, collecting a number of unnamed tributary streams. The one named tributary, Gerlib Creek, joins Bourgeaux Creek from the north, about 5 km (3.1 mi) upstream of Bourgeaux's mouth at the Little Iskut River. Artifact Ridge lies on the south side of Bourgeaux Creek's watershed. Significant mountains on the north side include Hoyaa Peak, Esja Peak, Armadillo Peak, Tadeda Peak, and Cache Hill.

== History ==
Bourgeaux Creek was named for F. Bourgeaux, a member of the Western Union Telegraph Company party which, in 1866, explored the area for an overland telegraph route to Europe via Alaska, the Bering Strait and Asia. That telegraph was never built, but the nearly 3,000-kilometre-long (1,900-mile) Yukon Telegraph Line was constructed by the Dominion Government Telegraph Service between 1897 and 1901 to send messages from Ashcroft, British Columbia in the south to Dawson City, Yukon in the north. This telegraph line followed Bourgeaux Creek to Raspberry Pass, then continued down Raspberry Creek, thence north to the community of Telegraph Creek on the Stikine River. The Yukon Telegraph Line operated until 1936 and only remnants remain today. The historic Yukon Telegraph Trail follows its route.

== See also ==
- List of rivers of British Columbia
