= Sezill Volcano =

Volcano in British Columbia, Canada

Coordinates: 57.59°N 130.62°W

Sezill Volcano is a lava dome in Mount Edziza Provincial Park of northern British Columbia, Canada. It is thought to have formed and last erupted during the Miocene period. The volcano gets its name from being adjacent to Sezill Creek.

== See also ==
- List of volcanoes in Canada
- List of Northern Cordilleran volcanoes
- Mount Edziza volcanic complex
- Volcanism of Canada
- Volcanism of Western Canada
