= Erosion surface =

Natural surface created by rock erosion

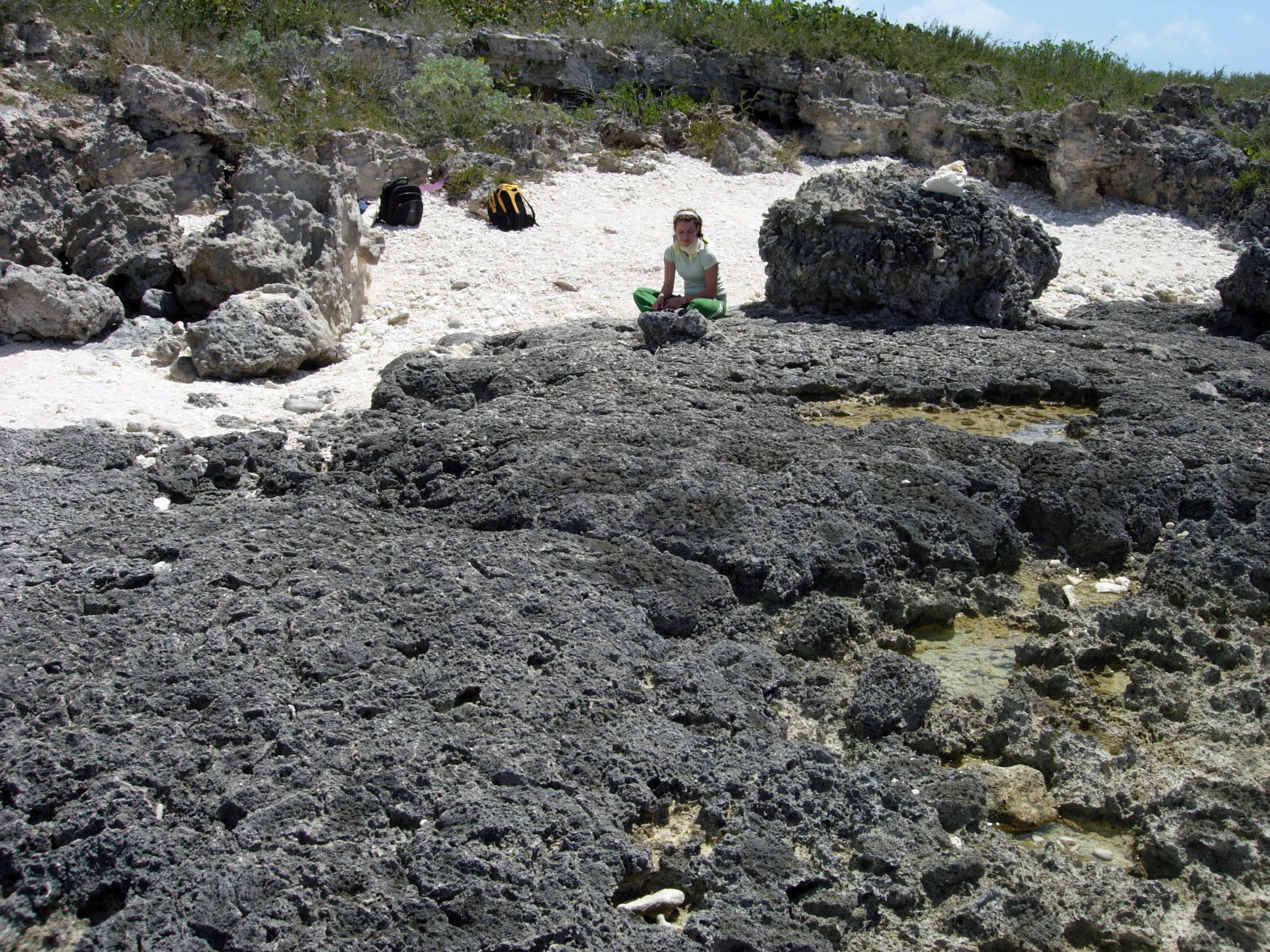
Eemian erosion surface in a fossil coral reef on Great Inagua, The Bahamas. Foreground shows corals truncated by erosion; behind the geologist is a post-erosion coral pillar which grew on the surface after sea level rose again.

In geology and geomorphology, an erosion surface is a surface of rock or regolith that was formed by erosion and not by construction (e.g. lava flows, sediment deposition) nor fault displacement. Erosional surfaces within the stratigraphic record are known as unconformities, but not all unconformities are buried erosion surfaces. Erosion surfaces vary in scale and can be formed on a mountain range or a rock. Particularly large and flat erosion surfaces receive the names of peneplain, paleoplain, planation surface or pediplain. An example of erosion surface is road surface erosion which is caused by natural and anthropogenic factors. Erosion surface can be measured through direct, contact measurement methods and indirect, non-contact measurement methods.

== Road surface erosion ==
Just like mountains and rocks, erosion can also occur on unsealed roads due to natural and anthropogenic factors. Road surface erosion could be caused by snowfall, rainfall and wind. The material and hydraulic of the road surface, road slope, traffic, construction, and maintenance could also potentially affect road surface erosion rate. During winter, snow cover slows down erosion rate by preventing direct contact between the raindrop and the road surface. For example, in the mountains of Idaho, U.S., snowfall caused less than 10% while rainfall caused 90% of total annual sediment production on the road surface. In addition to natural factors, high traffic volume can also speed up the road erosion rates. The friction caused by moving vehicles could potentially lead to crushing and abrasion, thus break down the coarse particles on the road surface. Slope steepness is another important factor in surface erosion--steeper roads tend to have higher erosion rates.

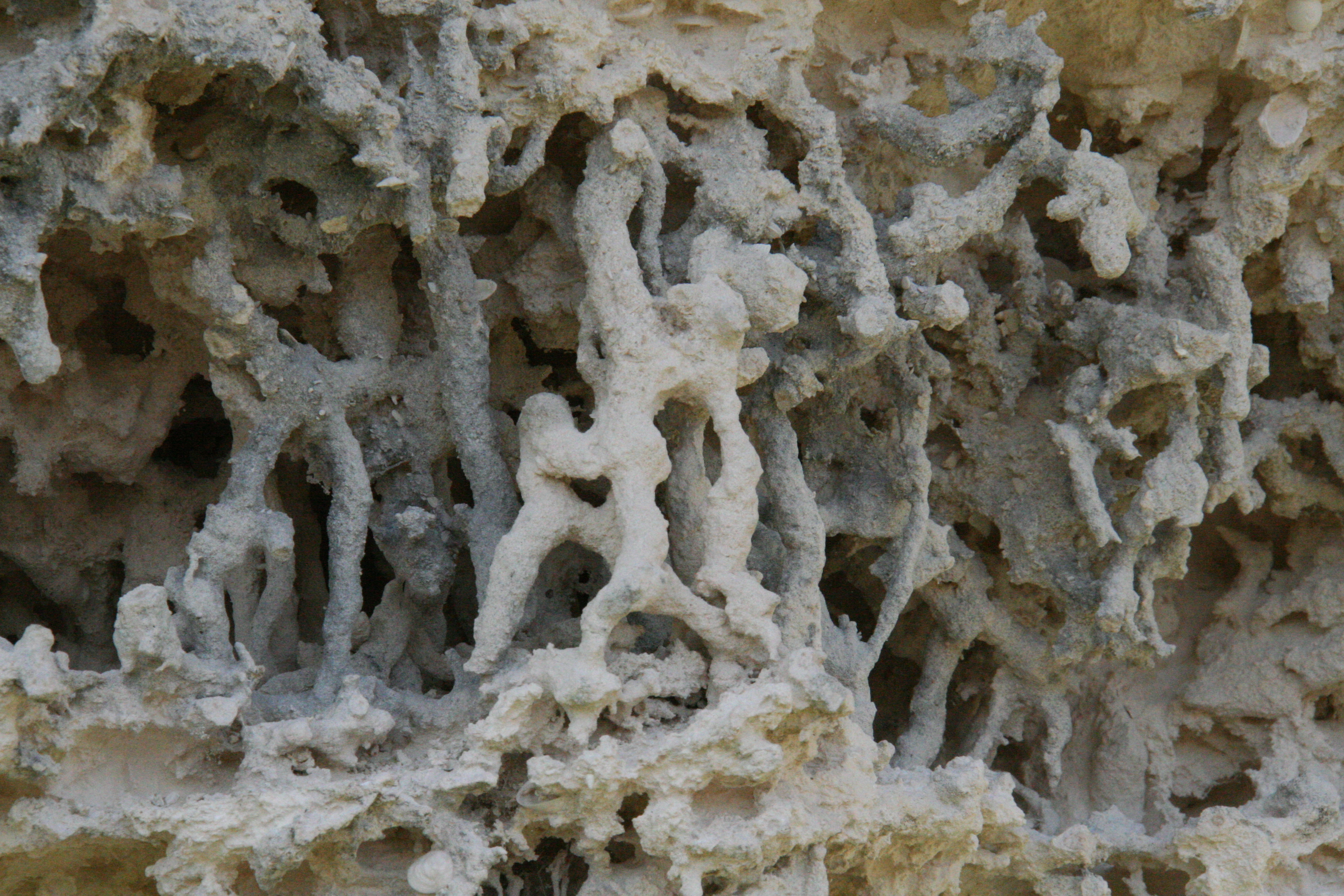
Rhizolith group produced by wind erosion.

== Measurement of erosion surface ==
There are two types of methods to measure the rate of surface change: direct, contact measurement methods and indirect, non-contact measurement methods. These measurement could be taken for different components of a rock or for different rock types. Rate of rock surface recession can be measured by using reference points or reference planes and measure the distance among those points and plane over the years. Rock surface erosion rate can also be measured using Micro-Erosion Meter(MEM). This triangular instrument is placed on three studs that are permanently fixed into the rock surface to provide a measurement site. The extension of the probe is then used to measure erosion. Indirect, non-contact measurement methods include laser scanning and digital photogrammetry. While laser scanning requires many specialist and expensive equipment, repeat photography and digital photogrammetry can also be used to obtain data for researchers with a much smaller budget.
