= Armadillo Peak =

7.5-million-year-old caldera in British Columbia, Canada

- Location within British Columbia
- Interactive map of Armadillo Peak

Highest point
- Elevation: 2,210 m (7,250 ft)
- Prominence: 405 m (1,329 ft)
- Listing: Volcanoes of Canada
- Coordinates: 57°32′17″N 130°33′36″W

Geography
- Location: British Columbia, Canada
- District: Cassiar Land District
- Parent range: Tahltan Highland
- Topo map: NTS 104G10 Mount Edziza

Geology
- Rock age: 7.5 million years
- Mountain type: Caldera
- Last eruption: Miocene

Armadillo Peak is a 7.5-million-year-old caldera, located about 3 km north of Bourgeaux Creek and northeast of Raspberry Pass, British Columbia, Canada. It is south of Mount Edziza and is overlapped by the Ice Peak central volcano, which was formed during the early Pleistocene. Its caldera is largely destroyed by glaciers. It is part of the Mount Edziza volcanic complex, which is made of basaltic lava flows.

== See also ==
- Cascade Volcanoes
- List of Northern Cordilleran volcanoes
- Northern Cordilleran Volcanic Province
- Volcanic history of the Northern Cordilleran Volcanic Province
- Volcanology of Canada
- Volcanology of Western Canada
