= Raspberry Pass =

Mountain pass in British Columbia, Canada

- Location within British Columbia
- Elevation: 1,688 metres (5,538 ft)

Third Approach
- Location: British Columbia, Canada
- Range: Tahltan Highland
- Coordinates: 57°30′59″N 130°43′06″W
- Topo map: NTS 104G10 Mount Edziza

Raspberry Pass is a mountain pass in the Tahltan Highland of northwestern British Columbia, Canada. It is located southeast of Telegraph Creek between the heads of Raspberry Creek and Bourgeaux Creek in Mount Edziza Provincial Park. Raspberry Pass forms a boundary between the Spectrum Range and the Mount Edziza area, cutting northwesterly through the middle of the Mount Edziza volcanic complex.

Raspberry Pass is the namesake of the Raspberry Formation, a geological formation of the Mount Edziza volcanic complex. The mountain pass provided a passageway for the Yukon Telegraph Trail which was established by the Dominion Government Telegraph Service from 1898 to 1901.

== See also ==
- Destell Pass
