= Sheep Track Member =

Geological member in British Columbia, Canada

- Stratigraphic range: Holocene; 0.0118–0 Ma
- Type: Geological member
- Unit of: Big Raven Formation
- Overlies: Snowshoe Lava Field, Ice Peak Formation, Kakiddi Formation
- Area: About 40 square kilometres (15 square miles)
- Thickness: Up to 2 metres (6.6 feet)

Lithology
- Primary: Comenditic trachyte

Location
- Coordinates: 57.64°N 130.67°W
- Region: British Columbia
- Country: Canada

Type section
- Named by: Souther, 1988
- Location in Mount Edziza Provincial Park

The Sheep Track Member is a stratigraphic unit of the Big Raven Formation, part of the Mount Edziza volcanic complex in northwestern British Columbia, Canada. It consists of pumice from an explosive eruption that fell over an area about 40 square kilometres (15 square miles). The pumice is of comenditic trachyte composition and reaches a thickness of up to 2 metres (6.6 feet) along the western edge of Tencho Glacier.

The Sheep Track Member was originally defined as the Sheep Track Formation in 1984 and was one of many geological formations comprising the Mount Edziza volcanic complex. However, it was lowered to member rank in 1988 when it became a unit of the Big Raven Formation. The Sheep Track Member has also been called the Sheep Track Pumice due to the member consisting primarily of pumice.

== History ==
The Sheep Track Member was initially ranked as a geological formation by Jack Souther, Richard Lee Armstrong and J. Harakal in 1984 who grouped it together with the Big Raven Formation in their descriptions and mapping. Formerly called the Sheep Track Formation, it was reassigned as a member of the Big Raven Formation by Jack Souther in 1988; its recognition as a geological formation has since been abandoned. Sheep Track Pumice has been used as an alternative name for the Sheep Track Member by Natural Resources Canada and the Geological Association of Canada.

During its time as a geological formation in 1984, it was one of 15 geological formations comprising the Mount Edziza volcanic complex in northwestern British Columbia, Canada. In 1988, the number of geological formations comprising the Mount Edziza volcanic complex dropped to 13 when the Sheep Track and Kounugu formations were reassigned as members of the Big Raven and Nido formations, respectively.

== Stratigraphy ==
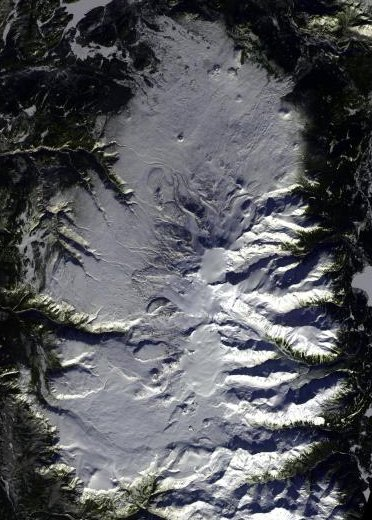
The Sheep Track Member is on the southern end of the Big Raven Plateau

Stratigraphically, the Sheep Track Member is a minor unit of the Big Raven Formation, covering area of about 40 square kilometres (15 square miles) with a total volume of less than 1 cubic kilometre (0.24 cubic miles). It was deposited on nearly all Snowshoe Lava Field flows and cinder cones of the Big Raven Formation, as well as on sediment of the surrounding Big Raven Plateau. The Sheep Track Member was also deposited on Koosick Bluff of the Ice Peak Formation and on Kakiddi Formation trachyte from Punch Cone on the western flank of Ice Peak. Both the Ice Peak and Kakiddi formations are older units of the Mount Edziza volcanic complex that were deposited about one million and 0.3 million years ago, respectively. Erosion has largely removed the Sheep Track Member from drainage channels of small intermittent streams on the upper Big Raven Plateau, but deposits as much as 2 m (6.6 ft) thick occur in interfluvial areas.

== Lithology ==
The Sheep Track Member is lithologically distinct from the rest of the Big Raven Formation, consisting mainly of comenditic trachyte that straddles near the alkaline–peralkaline boundary. It is in the form of air-fall pumice which reaches a thickness of up to 2 m (6.6 ft) along the western edge of Tencho Glacier where snowball-sized pumice fragments up to 10 centimetres (3.9 inches) wide are distributed over an area of several square kilometres. The pumice rapidly decreases to pea-sized fragments around the margins of the pile, covering a circular area at least 10 kilometres (6.2 miles) in diameter. Thin drifts of wind-blown pumice cover The Saucer in the Snowshoe Lava Field which likely postdates the deposition of the Sheep Track Member.

Pumice of the Sheep Track Member comprises clear trachytic glass with tubular, open vesicles; alkali feldspar is in the form of rare microphenocrysts. It is compositionally distinct from the Finlay tephras which may have originated from Level Mountain, Hoodoo Mountain, Heart Peaks or the Mount Edziza volcanic complex.

== Source ==
Location of the Sheep Track Member in British Columbia, Canada

The Sheep Track Member was deposited by a small but violent VEI-3 eruption from the southwestern flank of Ice Peak near the end of the Big Raven eruptive period. The vent location for this eruption remains unknown but it is probably hidden under Tencho Glacier, the largest glacier of the Mount Edziza volcanic complex. An artifact of the Sheep Track eruption may lie north of Coffee Crater where a deep, circular depression is present on the surface of the glacier. This depression may be caused by subglacial melting brought on by fumaroles, hot springs or heightened ground temperatures adjacent to the vent.

== Age ==
The Sheep Track Member is absent within the trim lines of Mount Edziza's alpine glaciers, indicating that it was deposited by the Sheep Track eruption during the last glacial advance starting about 2,600 years ago. However, Sheep Track pumice is present on the subglacial volcano of Tennena Cone which suggests that glaciers of the last glacial advance had already begun to retreat before deposition. Fission track dating of pumice on the southwestern flank of Ice Peak has yielded an age of 950 CE ± 6000 years.

== See also ==
- Geology of British Columbia
