= Cartoona Ridge =

Mountain ridge in the country of Canada

- Location within British Columbia

Highest point
- Peak: Cartoona Peak
- Elevation: 2,300 m (7,500 ft)
- Coordinates: 57°36′24″N 130°36′53″W

Geography
- Location: British Columbia, Canada
- District: Cassiar Land District
- Parent range: Tahltan Highland
- Topo map: NTS 104G10 Mount Edziza

Cartoona Ridge is a mountain ridge extending east from the eastern side of the Mount Edziza volcanic complex in northwestern British Columbia, Canada. It is bounded on the north by Shaman Creek valley, on the south by Chakima Creek valley, on the east by Kakiddi Creek valley and on the west by the Big Raven Plateau. Its highest point and only named peak is Cartoona Peak at the westernmost end of the ridge with an elevation of 2,300 metres (7,500 feet). Carttona Ridge is one of three ridges east of the Big Raven Plateau named by Canadian volcanologist Jack Souther, the other two being Idiji Ridge and Sorcery Ridge to the north.

The lower slopes of Cartoona Ridge are covered with felsenmeer, till and glacial and fluvial outwash, as well as solifluction deposits. The lowermost rock outcrops are Miocene alkali basalt flows of the Raspberry Formation. Overlying these rocks are Miocene comendites and trachytes of the Armadillo Formation which are in the form of pumice, ash flows, tuffs, lava flows and lava domes. The Armadillo Formation at the westernmost end of Cartoona Ridge is overlain by Pliocene alkali basalt of the Nido Formation.

== See also ==
- Volcanism of the Mount Edziza volcanic complex
