= Cocoa Crater =

Cinder cone in British Columbia, Canada

- Cocoa Cone
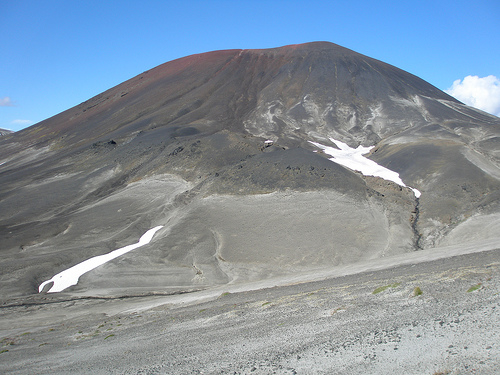
- Cocoa Crater from the south

Highest point
- Elevation: 2,117 m (6,946 ft)
- Coordinates: 57°39′20″N 130°42′25″W

Geography
- Location in British Columbia
- Location in Mount Edziza Provincial Park
- Country: Canada
- Province: British Columbia
- District: Cassiar Land District
- Protected area: Mount Edziza Provincial Park
- Parent range: Tahltan Highland
- Topo map: NTS 104G10 Mount Edziza

Geology
- Formed by: Volcanism
- Mountain type: Cinder cone
- Rock type: Hawaiite
- Volcanic field: Snowshoe Lava Field
- Last eruption: Holocene age

Cocoa Crater, sometimes called Cocoa Cone, is a cinder cone in Cassiar Land District of northwestern British Columbia, Canada. It has an elevation of 2,117 metres (6,946 feet) and is one of several volcanic cones in the Snowshoe Lava Field at the southern end of the Big Raven Plateau. The cone is southeast of the community of Telegraph Creek in Mount Edziza Provincial Park, which is one of the largest provincial parks in British Columbia. Coffee Crater was the source of a 2-kilometre-wide (1.2-mile) lava flow that travelled to the northwest.

Cocoa Crater is a part of the Mount Edziza volcanic complex, which consists of diverse landforms such as shield volcanoes, stratovolcanoes, lava domes and cinder cones. The cone contains a volcanic crater and was the source of a 2 km (1.2 mi) wide lava flow that travelled northwest on the Big Raven Plateau into the upper portion of Sezill Creek canyon. Cocoa Crater is surrounded by a number of other volcanic features, including Punch Cone, Koosick Bluff, Coffee Crater, Keda Cone and Hoia Bluff.

== Name and etymology ==
Cocoa Crater was officially named on May 6, 1954, and was adopted on the National Topographic System map 104G. In his 1992 report The Late Cenozoic Mount Edziza Volcanic Complex, British Columbia, Canadian volcanologist Jack Souther gave Cocoa Crater the numeronym SLF-10, SLF being an acronym for the Snowshoe Lava Field. Cocoa Crater is called Cocoa Cone in the Catalogue of Canadian volcanoes, an online database provided by Natural Resources Canada. Cocoa is a reference to the cone's deep colours.

== Geography ==
Cocoa Crater is located in Cassiar Land District of northwestern British Columbia, Canada, immediately southwest of Mount Edziza at the southern end of the Big Raven Plateau. It has an elevation of 2,117 m (6,946 ft) and is the largest subaerial cone in the Snowshoe Lava Field, one of the largest areas of Holocene lava flows in the Mount Edziza volcanic complex. The volcanic complex consists of a group of overlapping shield volcanoes, stratovolcanoes, lava domes and cinder cones that have formed over the last 7.5 million years. As its name suggests, Cocoa Crater contains a volcanic crater; such features are common among cinder cones. The cone is near the southwestern end of Tencho Glacier, the largest glacier of the Mount Edziza volcanic complex.

Cocoa Crater is surrounded by a number of other landforms within the Mount Edziza volcanic complex. Just northeast of Cocoa Crater is Punch Cone, an older volcanic feature on the western side of Tencho Glacier. Koosick Bluff immediately north of Cocoa Crater is another volcanic feature older than Punch Cone. About 3 km (1.9 mi) southwest and 5 km (3.1 mi) south-southeast of Cocoa Crater are Coffee Crater and Keda Cone, respectively, both of which are also in the Snowshoe Lava Field. Hoia Bluff, about 7 km (4.3 mi) west of Cocoa Crater, is at the southwestern edge of the Big Raven Plateau.

Cocoa Crater lies in Mount Edziza Provincial Park southeast of the community of Telegraph Creek. With an area of 2,661.8 square kilometres (1,027.7 square miles), Mount Edziza Provincial Park is one of the largest provincial parks in British Columbia and was established in 1972 to preserve the volcanic landscape. It includes not only the Mount Edziza area but also the Spectrum Range to the south, which are separated by Raspberry Pass. Mount Edziza Provincial Park is in the Tahltan Highland, a southeast-trending upland area extending along the western side of the Stikine Plateau.

== Geology ==
As a part of the Mount Edziza volcanic complex, Cocoa Crater lies within a broad area of volcanoes called the Northern Cordilleran Volcanic Province, which extends from northwestern British Columbia northwards through Yukon into easternmost Alaska. The dominant rocks that make up these volcanoes are alkali basalts and hawaiites, but nephelinites, basanites and peralkaline phonolites, trachytes and comendites are locally abundant. These rocks were deposited by volcanic eruptions from 20 million years ago to as recently as a few hundred years ago. Volcanism in the Northern Cordilleran Volcanic Province is thought to be due to rifting of the North American Cordillera, driven by changes in relative plate motion between the North American and Pacific plates.

Cocoa Crater is a hawaiitic cinder cone of the Big Raven Formation, the youngest stratigraphic unit of the Mount Edziza volcanic complex. The construction of Cocoa Crater took place during the Holocene and was accompanied by the eruption of lava and pyroclastic rocks. A 2 km (1.2 mi) wide lava flow from the cone travelled to the northwest, spread across the Big Raven Plateau and entered the upper portion of Sezill Creek canyon. It was forced to flow around the western end of Koosick Bluff due to the presence of a stagnant valley glacier along the southern margin of the lava flow at the time of eruption. In the steep-sided upper canyon of Sezill Creek, the lava front ends 180 m (590 ft) above the valley floor where subterranean streams emerge from under the lava flow.

== See also ==
- List of Northern Cordilleran volcanoes
- List of volcanoes in Canada
- Volcanism of the Mount Edziza volcanic complex
