= Taweh Creek =

Taweh Creek Big Sheep Creek
- Mouth of Taweh Creek

Location
- Country: Canada
- Province: British Columbia
- District: Cassiar Land District

Physical characteristics
- Source: Big Raven Plateau
  - location: Tahltan Highland
  - coordinates: 57°37′08″N 130°39′09″W
  - elevation: 1,870 m (6,140 ft)
- Mouth: Mess Creek
  - coordinates: 57°41′53″N 130°57′35″W
  - elevation: 558 m (1,831 ft)
- Length: 25 km (16 mi)
- Basin size: 159 km^{2} (61 sq mi)
- Discharge
  - average: 4.32 m^{3}/s (153 cu ft/s)

Basin features
- Tributaries
  - right: Sezill Creek
- Topo map: NTS 104G10 Mount Edziza

Taweh Creek is a tributary of Mess Creek, which in turn is a tributary of the Stikine River in northwest part of the province of British Columbia, Canada. It flows generally northwest for about 25 km (16 mi) to join Mess Creek about 15 km (9.3 mi) northwest of Mess Creek's confluence with Raspberry Creek. Taweh Creek's watershed covers 159 km^{2} (61 sq mi) and its mean annual discharge is estimated at 4.32 m^{3}/s (153 cu ft/s). The mouth of Taweh Creek is located about 25 km (16 mi) southeast of Telegraph Creek, about 60 km (37 mi) west-southwest of Iskut and about 100 km (62 mi) southwest of Dease Lake. Taweh Creek's watershed's land cover is classified as 41.3% barren, 21.1% shrubland, 20.7% conifer forest, 8.4% herbaceous, 8.1% snow/glacier, and small amounts of other cover.

Taweh Creek is in Mount Edziza Provincial Park which lies within the traditional territory of the Tahltan people.

== Geography ==
Taweh Creek originates on the southern end of the Big Raven Plateau. From its source just south of Mount Edziza between Coffee Crater and Cartoona Peak, Taweh Creek flows about 2 km (1.2 mi) southwest to the northern base of Keda Cone. It then flows about 3 km (1.9 mi) west to near the southwestern end of the Big Raven Plateau. From there, Taweh Creek flows about 6 km (3.7 mi) northwest to Hola Bluff where it flows north-northwest through a valley on the eastern edge of the Big Raven Plateau for an additional 8 km (5.0 mi). Taweh Creek then flows about 6 km (3.7 mi) west through a gorge to empty into Mess Creek.

Taweh Creek's only named tributary, Sezill Creek, is about 6 km (3.7 mi) east of Taweh Creek's confluence with Mess Creek. It is about 11 km (6.8 mi) long and flows northwest into Taweh Creek from the western side of Mount Edziza.

== Geology ==
Taweh Creek flows from a linear group of volcanoes called the Mount Edziza volcanic complex. As a result, Taweh Creek has been engulfed by tongues of lava from the neighbouring Snowshoe Lava Field. Most of this lava issued from cinder cones but one of the youngest lava flows to enter Taweh Creek originated from a fissure vent known as The Saucer. While the majority of this lava converged into the head of Taweh Creek, some of it formerly extended more than 15 km (9.3 mi) downstream to near Mess Creek. An erosional remnant of this lava forms the lip of an 18-metre-high (59-foot) waterfall at an elevation of 730 m (2,400 ft). The Taweh Creek lava flows are of Holocene age and form part of the Big Raven Formation.

== History ==
The historic Yukon Telegraph Trail crosses Taweh Creek in Mess Creek valley. It was built to serve the nearly 3,000 km-long (1,900 mi) Yukon Telegraph Line which was constructed by the Dominion Government Telegraph Service between 1897 and 1901 to send messages from Ashcroft, British Columbia in the south to Dawson City, Yukon in the north. The telegraph trail crosses other tributaries along the eastern side of Mess Creek, including Crayke Creek about 4 km (2.5 mi) north of Taweh Creek.

Taweh Creek was formerly called Big Sheep Creek which appeared on a BC Lands map published in 1929. Its current name was suggested by the BC Geographic Division to avoid confusion with other similarly-named features; it first appeared on maps in 1945. Taweh means mountain sheep in the Tagish language.

== See also ==
- List of rivers of British Columbia
