= Tencho Glacier =

Glacier in British Columbia, Canada

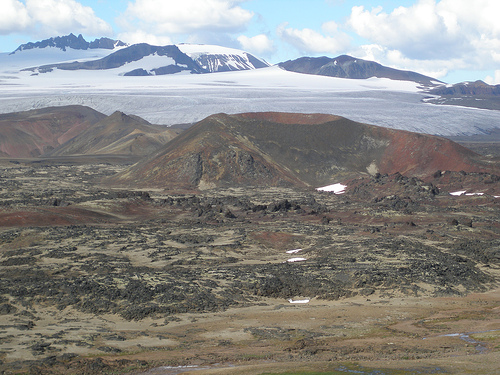
- Coffee Crater with Tencho Glacier in the background

- Location within British Columbia
- Interactive map of Tencho Glacier
- Type: Mountain glacier
- Location: Mount Edziza, British Columbia, Canada
- Coordinates: 57°38′59″N 130°39′06″W
- Status: Retreating

Tencho Glacier is a mountain glacier in northwestern British Columbia, Canada. It is located inside Mount Edziza Provincial Park on the Tahltan Highland, an upland area of the Stikine Plateau. Tencho Glacier is the source of several small streams that flow from the Mount Edziza volcanic complex.

== Etymology ==
The name of the glacier was suggested by the Geological Survey of Canada on November 15, 1979, and eventually became official on November 24, 1980. Tencho is derived from the Tahltan words ten and cho, which mean ice and big or great respectively. This glacier is so-named because it is the largest glacier of the Mount Edziza volcanic complex.

== Geography ==
Tencho Glacier originates from Ice Peak and Tennena Cone on the southern flank of Mount Edziza. Its southern terminus is surrounded by Kaia Bluff in the southeast, Coffee Crater in the south and Cocoa Crater in the southwest. Unnamed tributaries of Taweh Creek originate from the southwestern side of Tencho Glacier between Cocoa Crater and Coffee Crater. Shaman Creek originates from the southern end of Tencho Glacier whereas the eastern side of Tencho Glacier is drained by unnamed tributaries of Tennaya Creek. Several unnamed tributaries of Sezill Creek originate from the western side of Tencho Glacier by Tennena Cone.

== Geology ==
Tencho Glacier overlies the Ice Peak Formation, one of several geological formations comprising the Mount Edziza volcanic complex. Obsidian of the Ice Peak Formation occurs east and west of Tencho Glacier and possibly extends under the glacier. Beds of coarse comenditic trachyte pumice belonging to the Sheep Track Member of the Big Raven Formation are exposed along the western edge of Tencho Glacier. They are up to 2 metres (6.6 feet) thick and were deposited by an eruption that probably originated from a deep, circular depression on the surface of Tencho Glacier north of Coffee Crater. A crescent-shaped ridge at the southern terminus of Tencho Glacier might be a glacially modified tuff ring that formed in a meltwater lake when the glacier extended onto the Big Raven Plateau.

== See also ==
- List of glaciers in Canada
- Idiji Glacier
- Tenchen Glacier
- Tennaya Glacier
