= Tencho =

Tencho may refer to:

- Tenchō, a Japanese era name
- Tencho Glacier, a glacier in British Columbia, Canada
