= Tennaya =

Tennaya can refer to:

- Tennaya Creek, a stream in British Columbia, Canada
- Tennaya Glacier, a glacier in British Columbia, Canada
