= Tennaya Glacier =

Glacier in British Columbia, Canada

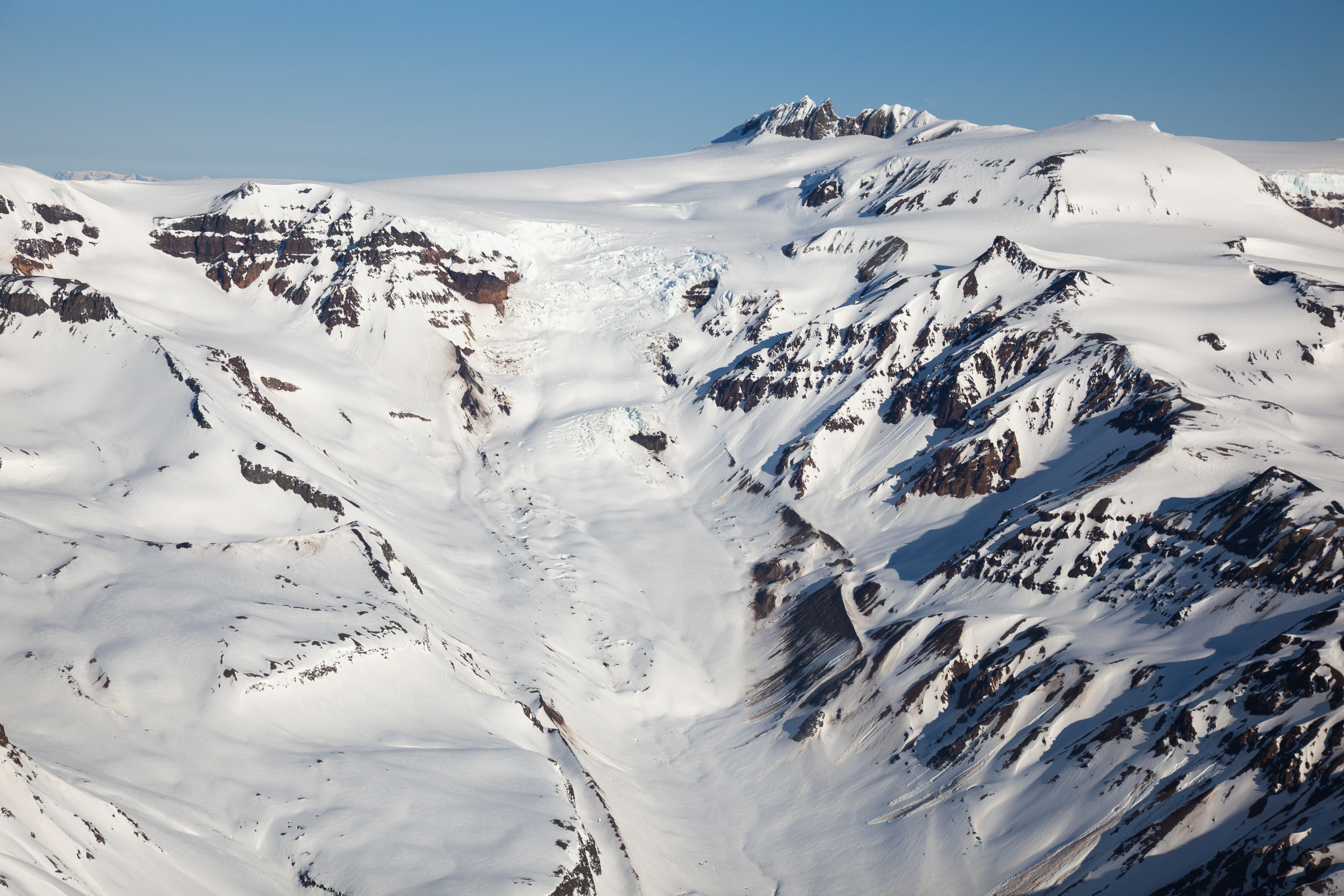
- Tennaya Glacier covered in snow

- Location within British Columbia
- Interactive map of Tennaya Glacier
- Type: Mountain glacier
- Location: Mount Edziza, British Columbia, Canada
- Coordinates: 57°41′59″N 130°37′06″W
- Status: Retreating

Tennaya Glacier is one of several glaciers draining the eastern side of the Mount Edziza ice cap in northwestern British Columbia, Canada. It is located southeast of the summit of Mount Edziza and northwest of Ice Peak at the head of Tennaya Creek. Meltwater from Tennaya Glacier feeds Tennaya Creek which eventually flows into Nuttlude Lake, an expansion of Kakiddi Creek.

The name of the glacier was suggested by the Geological Survey of Canada on November 15, 1979, and eventually became official on November 24, 1980. Tennaya is derived from the Tahltan words ten and naya, which mean ice and be come down respectively. The name of this glacier is a reference to a spectacular icefall at the head of Tennaya valley.

== Geology ==
At the head of Tennaya Glacier are rocks assigned to the upper assemblage of the Ice Peak Formation. They consist of trachyte, benmoreite, mugearite, tristanite, trachybasalt and alkali basalt that are in the form of lava flows, lava domes and pyroclastic breccia. Also at the head of Tennaya Glacier is trachyte and comenditic trachyte of the Edziza Formation which are in the form of pyroclastic breccia and lahar and ash flow deposits, as well as lava flows and endogenous lava domes.

Just below the trim line of Tennaya Glacier is a rounded hill completely covered with surficial deposits that may be the source of an alkali basalt flow of the Big Raven Formation. This lava flow travelled down Tennaya valley to near Kakiddi Lake via a narrow, wedge-shaped notch that formed as a result of erosion along the northern edge of an older and thicker Kakiddi Formation trachyte flow.

== See also ==
- List of glaciers in Canada
- Idiji Glacier
- Tencho Glacier
- Tenchen Glacier
