= Coffee Crater =

Cinder cone in British Columbia, Canada

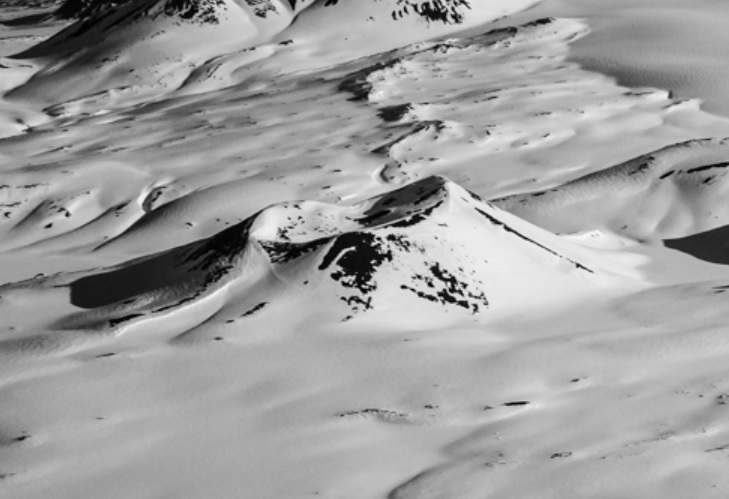
- Coffee Crater from the south

Highest point
- Elevation: 2,000 m (6,600 ft)
- Coordinates: 57°38′04″N 130°40′11″W (Note: Coordinates are derived from Google Earth.)

Geography
- Location in British Columbia
- Location in Mount Edziza Provincial Park
- Country: Canada
- Province: British Columbia
- District: Cassiar Land District
- Protected area: Mount Edziza Provincial Park
- Parent range: Tahltan Highland
- Topo map: NTS 104G10 Mount Edziza

Geology
- Formed by: Volcanism
- Mountain type: Cinder cone
- Rock type(s): Alkali basalt, hawaiite
- Volcanic field: Snowshoe Lava Field
- Last eruption: Holocene age

Coffee Crater is a cinder cone in Cassiar Land District of northwestern British Columbia, Canada. It has an elevation of 2,000 metres (6,600 feet) and is one of several volcanic cones in the Snowshoe Lava Field at the southern end of the Big Raven Plateau. The cone is southeast of the community of Telegraph Creek in Mount Edziza Provincial Park, which is one of the largest provincial parks in British Columbia. Coffee Crater the source of a lava flow that travelled to the southwest; it ponded against and partially overrode stagnant ice on the Big Raven Plateau.

Coffee Crater is a part of the Mount Edziza volcanic complex, which consists of diverse landforms such as shield volcanoes, stratovolcanoes, lava domes and cinder cones. The cone contains a volcanic crater and was the source of a lava flow that ponded against and partially overrode stagnant ice on the Big Raven Plateau. Part of the lava flow collapsed after the underlying stagnant ice melted away, forming an 18 m (59 ft) high escarpment. Coffee Crater is surrounded by a number of other volcanic features, including Cocoa Crater, Keda Cone, Punch Cone, Cartoona Peak and Kaia Bluff.

== Name and etymology ==
The name of the cone was adopted on National Topographic System map 104G on May 6, 1954, but it did not become official until December 10, 1972. In his 1992 report The Late Cenozoic Mount Edziza Volcanic Complex, British Columbia, Canadian volcanologist Jack Souther gave Coffee Crater the numeronym SLF-7, SLF being an acronym for the Snowshoe Lava Field. Coffee is a reference to the cone's deep colours.

== Geography ==
Coffee Crater is located in Cassiar Land District of northwestern British Columbia, Canada, just south of Mount Edziza at the southern end of the Big Raven Plateau. It has an elevation of 2,000 m (6,600 ft) and is one of several volcanic cones in the Snowshoe Lava Field, which is one of the largest areas of Holocene lava flows in the Mount Edziza volcanic complex. The volcanic complex consists of a group of overlapping shield volcanoes, stratovolcanoes, lava domes and cinder cones that have formed over the last 7.5 million years. As its name suggests, Coffee Crater contains a volcanic crater; such features are common among cinder cones. The cone is just south of Tencho Glacier, the largest glacier of the Mount Edziza volcanic complex.

Coffee Crater is surrounded by a number of other landforms within the Mount Edziza volcanic complex. About 3 kilometres (1.9 miles) northwest and south-southwest of Coffee Crater are Cocoa Crater and Keda Cone, respectively, both of which are also in the Snowshoe Lava Field. Punch Cone, an older volcanic feature, is about 4 km (2.5 mi) north-northwest of Coffee Crater. Cartoona Peak about 4 km (2.5 mi) southeast of Coffee Crater and Kaia Bluff about 3 km (1.9 mi) east-northeast of the cone are the remains of an even older and larger volcano dubbed Gamma Peak.

Coffee Crater lies in Mount Edziza Provincial Park southeast of the community of Telegraph Creek. With an area of 2,661.8 km^{2} (1,027.7 mi^{2}), Mount Edziza Provincial Park is one of the largest provincial parks in British Columbia and was established in 1972 to preserve the volcanic landscape. It includes not only the Mount Edziza area but also the Spectrum Range to the south, which are separated by Raspberry Pass. Mount Edziza Provincial Park is in the Tahltan Highland, a southeast-trending upland area extending along the western side of the Stikine Plateau.

== Geology ==
As a part of the Mount Edziza volcanic complex, Coffee Crater lies within a broad area of volcanoes called the Northern Cordilleran Volcanic Province, which extends from northwestern British Columbia northwards through Yukon into easternmost Alaska. The dominant rocks that make up these volcanoes are alkali basalts and hawaiites, but nephelinites, basanites and peralkaline phonolites, trachytes and comendites are locally abundant. These rocks were deposited by volcanic eruptions from 20 million years ago to as recently as a few hundred years ago. Volcanism in the Northern Cordilleran Volcanic Province is thought to be due to rifting of the North American Cordillera, driven by changes in relative plate motion between the North American and Pacific plates.

Coffee Crater is a basaltic cinder cone of the Big Raven Formation, the youngest stratigraphic unit of the Mount Edziza volcanic complex. The construction of Coffee Crater took place during the Holocene and was accompanied by the eruption of lava and tephra. It overlies a broad lobe of Kakiddi Formation trachyte which likely issued from Punch Cone in the north-northwest on the southwestern flank of Ice Peak. Edziza obsidian associated with the Armadillo Formation occurs adjacent to Coffee Crater.

Coffee Crater was the source of a lava flow that travelled to the southwest. The northern edge of the terminal lobe of this lava flow is bounded by an 18 m (59 ft) high escarpment which likely formed by collapse after the lava flow ponded against and partially overrode stagnant ice on the Big Raven Plateau. Exposed in the escarpment are pillows, radial columnar jointing and minor tuff breccia.

== See also ==
- List of Northern Cordilleran volcanoes
- List of volcanoes in Canada
- Volcanism of the Mount Edziza volcanic complex
