= Idiji Glacier =

Glacier in British Columbia, Canada

- Location within British Columbia
- Interactive map of Idiji Glacier
- Type: Mountain glacier
- Location: Mount Edziza, British Columbia, Canada
- Coordinates: 57°40′59″N 130°37′06″W
- Status: Retreating

Idiji Glacier is one of several glaciers draining the eastern side of the Mount Edziza ice cap in northwestern British Columbia, Canada. It is located south of the summit of Mount Edziza in a cirque just southeast of Ice Peak. Idiji Glacier is separated from the much larger Tencho Glacier by a ridge that extends south of Ice Peak above the Idiji cirque headwall. Idiji Glacier is the namesake of Idiji Ridge which is just to the southeast.

The name of the glacier was suggested by the Geological Survey of Canada on November 15, 1979, and eventually became official on November 24, 1980. Idiji means "it thunders" in the Tahltan language, which refers to the loud noises stemming from this very active glacier.

At the head of Idiji Glacier are rocks assigned to the upper assemblage of the Ice Peak Formation. They consist of trachyte, benmoreite, mugearite, tristanite, trachybasalt and alkali basalt that are in the form of lava flows, lava domes and pyroclastic breccia. Bedded, lacustrine tuff and epiclastic debris exposed in a rock spur on the north side of Idiji Glacier was deposited in a now-destroyed summit crater, of which Ice Peak is a remnant of the western crater rim.

== See also ==
- List of glaciers in Canada
- Tenchen Glacier
- Tennaya Glacier
