= Tenchen Creek =

- Mouth of Tenchen Creek

Location
- Country: Canada
- Province: British Columbia
- District: Cassiar Land District

Physical characteristics
- Source: Tenchen Glacier
  - location: Mount Edziza
  - coordinates: 57°44′07″N 130°32′14″W
  - elevation: 1,233 m (4,045 ft)
- Mouth: Kakiddi Creek
  - location: Stikine Plateau
  - coordinates: 57°45′35″N 130°26′15″W
  - elevation: 762 m (2,500 ft)
- Length: 8 km (5.0 mi)
- Basin size: 42.3 km^{2} (16.3 sq mi)
- Discharge
  - average: 1.01 m^{3}/s (36 cu ft/s)

Basin features
- Topo map: NTS 104G10 Mount Edziza; NTS 104G9 Kinaskan Lake; NTS 104G16 Klastline River

Tenchen Creek is a tributary of Kakiddi Creek, which in turn is a tributary of the Klastline River, part of the Stikine River watershed in northwest part of the province of British Columbia, Canada. It flows generally flows northeast for about 8 km (5.0 mi) to join Kakiddi Creek about 13 km (8.1 mi) south of Kakiddi Creek's confluence with the Klastline River. Tenchen is a combination of the Tahltan words "ten" and "chen", which mean "ice" and "dirty" respectively.

Tenchen Creek's watershed covers 42.3 km^{2} (16.3 sq mi) and its mean annual discharge is estimated at 1.01 m^{3}/s (36 cu ft/s). The mouth of Tenchen Creek is located about 46 km (29 mi) southeast of Telegraph Creek, about 28 km (17 mi) west-southwest of Iskut and about 80 km (50 mi) south-southwest of Dease Lake. Elwyn Creek's watershed's land cover is classified as 32.5% barren, 28.4% conifer forest, 27% snow/glacier, 8% shrubland, 3.3% herbaceous, and small amounts of other cover.

Tenchen Creek is in Mount Edziza Provincial Park which lies within the traditional territory of the Tahltan people.

== Geography ==
Tenchen Creek originates with several small streams converging at the head of Tenchen Glacier on the east side of Mount Edziza. From its source, Tenchen Creek flows about 4 km (2.5 mi) east-northeast through conifer forest into the broad hummocky lowland of Kakiddi Valley. Tenchen Creek then flows about 1 km (0.62 mi) southeast before flowing an additional 3 km (1.9 mi) northwest where it drains into Kakiddi Creek.

== Geology ==
At the head of Tenchen Creek is an active cirque that has breached the eastern side of Mount Edziza's ice-filled summit crater. Exposed in the cirque headwall are hydrothermally altered rocks of the central volcanic conduit, as well as lava lakes that once filled the crater. These rocks are part of the Edziza Formation which comprises the nearly symmetrical trachyte stratovolcano of Mount Edziza.

In the north fork of Tenchen Creek valley is a 210 m (690 ft) high barrier of volcanic rocks called Cinder Cliff. It consists of thin, slaggy flows of basalt that ponded against stagnant ice of a valley glacier. The basalt is part of the Big Raven Formation, the youngest geological formation of the Mount Edziza volcanic complex.

Tenchen Creek is the namesake of the Tenchen Member, the northern geological member of the Nido Formation. Sideromelane tuff breccia of the Tenchen Member is exposed in cliffs on the northern side of Tenchen Creek.

== See also ==
- List of rivers of British Columbia
