= Tenchen Glacier =

Glacier in British Columbia, Canada

- Location within British Columbia
- Interactive map of Tenchen Glacier
- Type: Mountain glacier
- Location: Mount Edziza, British Columbia, Canada
- Coordinates: 57°43′59″N 130°35′06″W
- Status: Retreating

Tenchen Glacier is located on the eastern flank of Mount Edziza in northwestern British Columbia, Canada. It lies within an immense cirque whose headwall has breached the eastern side of Mount Edziza's summit crater. At the head of Tenchen Glacier are icefalls that drape down shear, 300-metre-high (980-foot) cliffs from the breached eastern crater rim; permanent ice fills the summit crater. Meltwater from Tenchen Glacier feeds Tenchen Creek which eventually merges with Kakiddi Creek.

The name of the glacier was suggested by the Geological Survey of Canada on November 19, 1979, and eventually became official on November 24, 1980. Tenchen is derived from the Tahltan words ten and chen, which mean ice and dirty respectively. The name of this glacier is a reference to its debris-covered surface.

== Geology ==
The Tenchen cirque is the product of erosion that gradually enlarged an initial scar formed by an explosive eruption that blew away part of the eastern summit crater rim. Hydrothermally altered rocks of the central volcanic conduit as well as lava lakes that once filled the summit crater are exposed in the headwall of Tenchen cirque. These rocks are part of the Edziza Formation which comprises the central stratovolcano of Mount Edziza. Landsliding of the steep headwall and bounding spurs of Tenchen cirque has resulted in Tenchen Glacier being completely covered by rock debris.

== See also ==
- List of glaciers in Canada
- Idiji Glacier
- Tencho Glacier
- Tennaya Glacier
