= Shaman Creek =

Tributary river in the country of Canada

- Mouth of Shaman Creek

Location
- Country: Canada
- Province: British Columbia
- District: Cassiar Land District

Physical characteristics
- Source: Near Mount Edziza
  - location: Tahltan Highland
  - coordinates: 57°38′51″N 130°38′5″W
  - elevation: 2,015 m (6,611 ft)
- Mouth: Kakiddi Lake, Kakiddi Creek
  - coordinates: 57°36′55″N 130°24′38″W
  - elevation: 790 m (2,590 ft)
- Length: 20 km (12 mi)
- Basin size: 153 km^{2} (59 sq mi)
- Discharge
  - average: 2.43 m^{3}/s (86 cu ft/s)

Basin features
- Topo map: NTS 104G9 Kinaskan Lake

Shaman Creek is a tributary of Kakiddi Lake, the source of Kakiddi Creek, and part of the Stikine River watershed in northwest part of the province of British Columbia, Canada. From its source in the glaciers south of Mount Edziza it flows generally east for roughly 20 km (12 mi) to empty into Kakiddi Lake, an expansion of Kakiddi Creek, a tributary of the Klastline River, which in turn is a tributary of the Stikine River.

Shaman Creek's mean annual discharge is estimated at 2.43 m^{3}/s (86 cu ft/s). Its watershed covers 153 km^{2} (59 sq mi) and is mostly within Mount Edziza Provincial Park. The watershed's land cover is classified as 44.9% conifer forest, 20.7% shrubland, 16.8% barren, 10.8% herbaceous, 3.1% snow/glacier, 2.3% wetland, and small amounts of other cover.

The mouth of Shaman Creek is located about 55 km (34 mi) southeast of Telegraph Creek, British Columbia, about 70 km (43 mi) north of Bob Quinn Lake, British Columbia, and about 250 km (160 mi) east of Juneau, Alaska.

Shaman Creek is in Mount Edziza Provincial Park, which lies within the traditional territory of the Tahltan First Nation, of the Tahltan people.

== Geography ==
Shaman Creek originates in the high peaks and glaciers south of Mount Edziza, such as Cartoona Peak, Kaia Bluff, and Tencho Glacier. From its source about 8 km (5.0 mi) south of the summit of Mount Edziza, Shaman Creek flows east for about 20 km (12 mi). It is joined by numerous unnamed tributaries. Just before emptying into Kakiddi Lake Shaman Creek is joined by Chakima Creek. The area around the confluence and the mouth of Shaman Creek is a wetland maze of beaver dams.

Shaman Creek's watershed is part of the Mount Edziza volcanic complex. It is mostly within Mount Edziza Provincial Park. Shaman Creek and its main tributary Chakima Creek are entirely within the park. Chakima Creek flows through Mowchilla Lake, and some of that lake's unnamed tributaries drain areas outside of Mount Edziza Provincial Park.

== See also ==
- List of rivers of British Columbia
