= Chakima Creek =

Tribuatary river in the country of Canada

- Mouth of Chakima Creek

Location
- Country: Canada
- Province: British Columbia
- District: Cassiar Land District

Physical characteristics
- Source: Near Cartoona Peak
  - location: Tahltan Highland
  - coordinates: 57°34′59″N 130°37′45″W
  - elevation: 1,815 m (5,955 ft)
- Mouth: Shaman Creek
  - coordinates: 57°36′41″N 130°24′50″W
  - elevation: 780 m (2,560 ft)
- Length: 19 km (12 mi)
- Basin size: 100 km^{2} (39 sq mi)
- Discharge
  - average: 1.49 m^{3}/s (53 cu ft/s)

Basin features
- Topo map: NTS 104G9 Kinaskan Lake; NTS 104G10 Mount Edziza

Chakima Creek is a tributary of Shaman Creek and part of the Stikine River watershed in northwest part of the province of British Columbia, Canada. From its source in the mountains south of Mount Edziza, near Cartoona Peak and Tadeda Peak, it flows generally east for roughly 19 km (12 mi) to empty into Shaman Creek, which flows to Kakiddi Creek, a tributary of the Klastline River, which in turn is a tributary of the Stikine River.

Chakima Creek's mean annual discharge is estimated at 1.49 m^{3}/s (53 cu ft/s). Its watershed covers 100 km^{2} (39 sq mi), and is mostly within Mount Edziza Provincial Park. The watershed's land cover is classified as 45.7% conifer forest, 26.6% shrubland, 14.0% barren, 9.6% herbaceous, and small amounts of other cover.

The mouth of Chakima Creek is located about 55 km (34 mi) southeast of Telegraph Creek, British Columbia, about 70 km (43 mi) north of Bob Quinn Lake, British Columbia, and about 250 km (160 mi) east of Juneau, Alaska.

Chakima Creek is in Mount Edziza Provincial Park, which lies within the traditional territory of the Tahltan First Nation, of the Tahltan people.

The name "Chakima" was created from the Talhtan words cha "beaver" and kima "house", referring to the maze of beaver dams and ponds in the area where Chakima Creek joins Shaman Creek.

== Geography ==
Chakima Creek originates in the high peaks south of Mount Edziza, north of Tadeda Peak and south of Cartoona Peak. From its source about 15 km (9.3 mi) south of the summit of Mount Edziza, Chakima Creek flows generally east for about 19 km (12 mi). It is joined by numerous unnamed tributaries which drain various mountains such as Esja Peak and Hoyaa Peak. In its lower reaches it makes a southward curve, coming close to Mowdade Lake, then bending northward into a large wetland area. It flows through the northern end Mowchilla Lake, then continues northeast through wetlands to empty into Shaman Creek. Mowchilla Lake and the various unnamed creeks that empty into it are part of Chakima Creek's watershed.

Chakima Creek's watershed is part of the Mount Edziza volcanic complex. It is mostly within Mount Edziza Provincial Park. Chakima Creek itself is entirely within the park. Chakima Creek flows through Mowchilla Lake, and some of that lake's unnamed tributaries, which are part of Chakima Creek's watershed, drain areas to the south and east of Mowchilla Lake, outside of Mount Edziza Provincial Park.

== See also ==
- List of rivers of British Columbia
