= Sezill Creek =

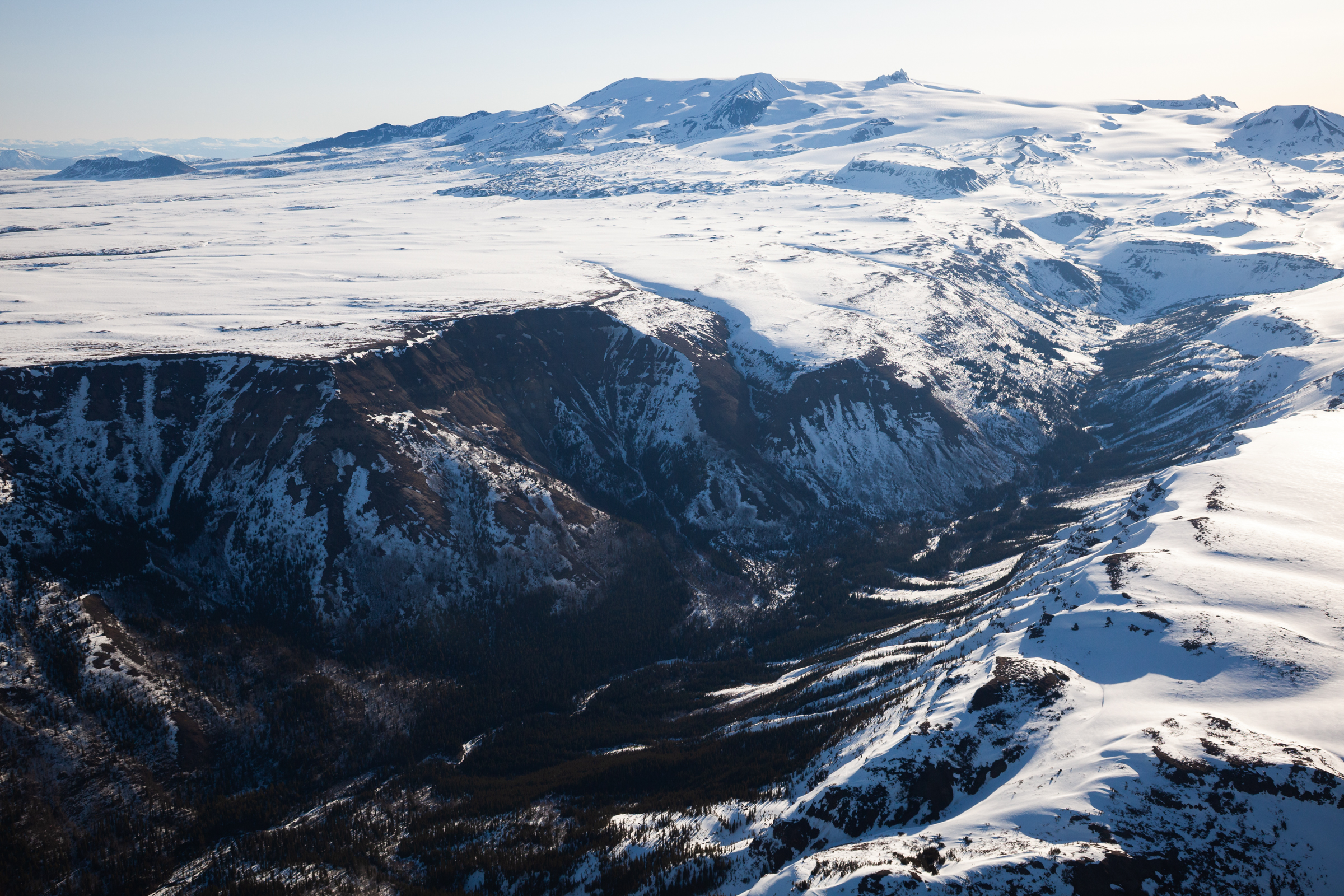
- Sezill Creek canyon with Mount Edziza in the background

- Mouth of Sezill Creek

Location
- Country: Canada
- Province: British Columbia
- District: Cassiar Land District

Physical characteristics
- Source: Mount Edziza
  - location: Big Raven Plateau
  - coordinates: 57°41′14″N 130°42′14″W
  - elevation: 1,858 m (6,096 ft)
- Mouth: Taweh Creek
  - coordinates: 57°41′49″N 130°52′51″W
  - elevation: 879 m (2,884 ft)
- Length: 12 km (7.5 mi)
- Basin size: 51.6 km^{2} (19.9 sq mi)
- Discharge
  - average: 1.51 m^{3}/s (53 cu ft/s)

Basin features
- Topo map: NTS 104G10 Mount Edziza

Sezill Creek is a tributary of Taweh Creek, which in turn is a tributary of Mess Creek, part of the Stikine River watershed in northwest part of the province of British Columbia, Canada. It flows generally northwest for roughly 12 km (7.5 mi) to join Taweh Creek about 5 km (3.1 mi) east of Taweh Creek's confluence with Mess Creek. Sezill means "it is hot" in the Tahltan language, referring to a group of hot springs that occur along the creek.

Sezill Creek's watershed covers 51.6 km^{2} (19.9 sq mi) and its mean annual discharge is estimated at 1.51 m^{3}/s (53 cu ft/s). The mouth of Sezill Creek is located about 28 km (17 mi) southeast of Telegraph Creek, about 56 km (35 mi) southwest of Iskut and about 98 km (61 mi) southwest of Dease Lake. Sezill Creek's watershed's land cover is classified as 36.2% barren, 24.7% shrubland, 15% conifer forest, 12.4% snow/glacier, 11.1% herbaceous, and small amounts of other cover.

Sezill Creek is in Mount Edziza Provincial Park which lies within the traditional territory of the Tahltan people.

== Geography ==
Sezill Creek originates from the western slope of the massive, glaciated Mount Edziza stratovolcano in the middle of the Big Raven Plateau. From its source between Ornostay Bluff and Koosick Bluff, Sezill Creek flows generally northwest and through a vegetated canyon to Taweh Creek. The head of Sezill Creek flows around an unnamed, low-lying bluff attaining an elevation of 1,872 m (6,142 ft).

== Geology ==
Sezill Creek contains a large group of hot springs about 7 km (4.3 mi) above its junction with Taweh Creek. These hot springs, known as the Sezill Hot Springs or the Taweh Hot Springs, extend along Sezill Creek for more than 500 m (1,600 ft). They occur at an elevation of 1,310 m (4,300 ft) and contain extensive tufa deposits. Their close association with the recently active Snowshoe Lava Field suggests that they may be discharging from a shallow hydrothermal system driven by residual magmatic heat. The main hot spring discharges water at a temperature of 46 °C (115 °F). A jet of 43 °C (109 °F) water on the north side of Sezill Creek is enriched with carbon dioxide.

Thin tongues of unglaciated pillow lava originating from the Mount Edziza volcanic complex extend into the upper part of Sezill Creek canyon. The distal end of this pillow flow has been cut by Sezill Creek to form a narrow, 6 m-deep (20 ft) box canyon. Tuff breccia consisting of blocks and irregular globules of vesicular basalt in a granular matrix commonly underlies the pillow flow.

== See also ==
- List of rivers of British Columbia
