= Cartoona Peak =

Volcanic peak in the country of Canada

- Location within British Columbia
- Interactive map of Cartoona Peak

Highest point
- Elevation: 2,305 m (7,562 ft)
- Prominence: 415 m (1,362 ft)
- Listing: List of volcanoes in Canada
- Coordinates: 57°36′24″N 130°36′53″W

Geography
- Location: British Columbia, Canada
- District: Cassiar Land District
- Parent range: Tahltan Highland
- Topo map: NTS 104G10 Mount Edziza

Geology
- Volcanic zone: Northern Cordilleran Volcanic Province

Cartoona Peak is a volcanic peak at the westernmost end of Cartoona Ridge in northern British Columbia, Canada, located just southeast of Coffee Crater in Mount Edziza Provincial Park.

== See also ==
- List of volcanoes in Canada
- List of Northern Cordilleran volcanoes
- Mount Edziza volcanic complex
- Volcanism of Canada
- Volcanism of Western Canada
