= Koosick Bluff =

Volcanic bluff in British Columbia, Canada

Coordinates: 57°40′26″N 130°43′31″W

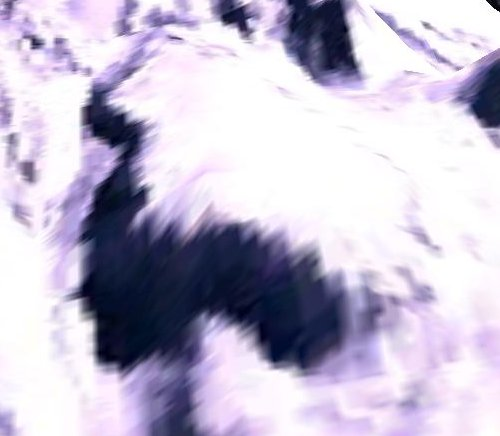
Satellite image of Koosick Bluff.

Koosick Bluff is a volcanic bluff in Cassiar Land District (Stikine Country) in northern British Columbia, Canada. It is located in Mount Edziza Provincial Park, just northwest of Cocoa Crater and southwest of Mount Edziza.

== See also ==
- List of volcanoes in Canada
- Volcanism in Canada
- Volcanism in Western Canada
