= Trim line =

Clear line on the side of a valley marking the most recent highest extent of the glacier

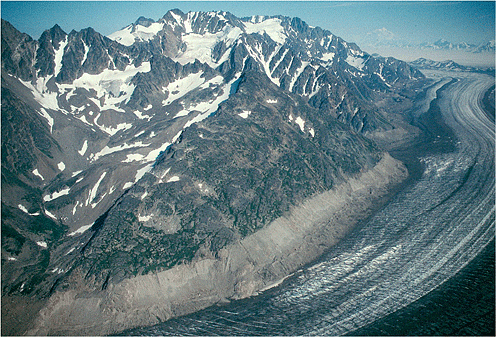
A trim line marks the previous height of Tana Glacier in Alaska

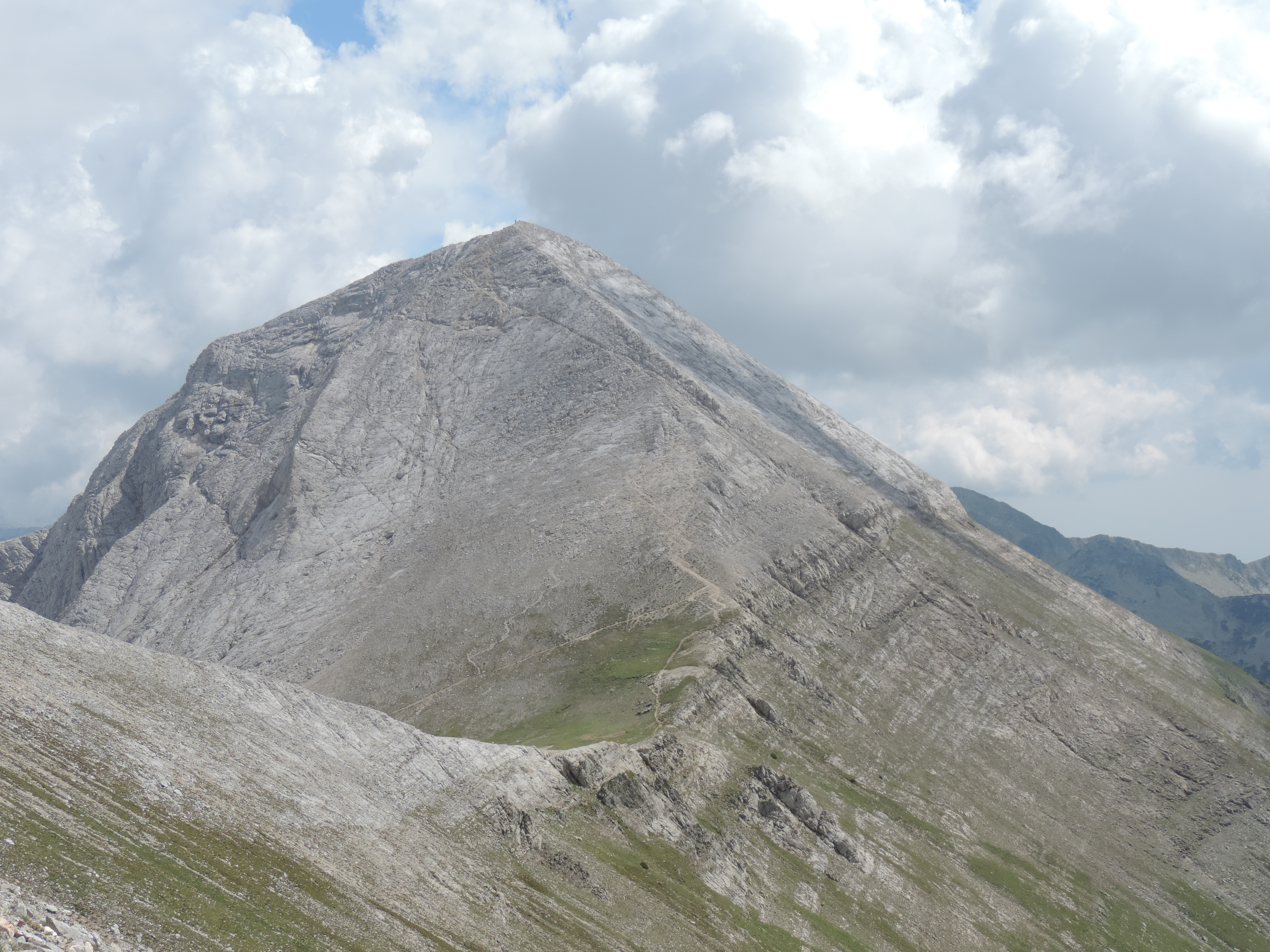
A trim line on Vihren peak, Pirin Mountain, Bulgaria

A trim line, also written as trimline, is a clear line on the side of a valley formed by a glacier. The line marks the most recent highest extent of the glacier. The line may be visible due to changes in color to the rock or to changes in vegetation on either side of the line.

The term "trim line" is also used for similar looking phenomena caused by floods, volcanic activity, or tsunamis.
