= The Saucer =

Cinder cone in British Columbia, Canada

Coordinates: 57.63°N 130.63°W

The Saucer is a cinder cone in northern British Columbia, Canada. It is thought to have last erupted in the Holocene epoch.

== See also ==
- List of volcanoes in Canada
- List of Northern Cordilleran volcanoes
- Volcanism of Canada
- Volcanism of Western Canada
