= Keda Cone =

Cinder cone in the country of Canada

Coordinates: 57.6°N 130.68°W

Keda Cone, sometimes mistakenly called Kena Cone and sometimes referred to by the numeronym SLF-9, is a cinder cone in northwestern British Columbia, Canada. It is located in the Snowshoe Lava Field of Mount Edziza Provincial Park, having last erupted during the Holocene epoch.

== See also ==
- List of volcanoes in Canada
- List of Northern Cordilleran volcanoes
- Volcanism of Canada
- Volcanism of Western Canada
