= Peralkaline rock =

Igneous rocks which have a deficiency of aluminium

Chart illustrating the meaning of peralkaline, metaluminous, peraluminous and subaluminous

Peralkaline rocks include those igneous rocks which have a deficiency of aluminium such that sodium and potassium are in excess of that needed for feldspar. The presence of aegerine (sodium pyroxene) and riebeckite (sodium amphibole) are indicative of peralkaline conditions. Examples are the peralkaline rhyolites, comendite and pantellerite, with comendite being the more felsic (silica-rich) rock. Another example is the peralkaline granite that forms the islet of Rockall in the North Atlantic Ocean.

Peralkaline rocks are indicative of continental rift-related volcanicity (e.g. the peralkaline rhyolites of the East African Rift in central Kenya) as well as continental and oceanic hotspot volcanicity (e.g. the peralkaline rhyolites of the Glass House Mountains in eastern Australia and the Canary Islands in the Atlantic Ocean). Peralkaline rocks related to subduction zone volcanicity have also been reported (e.g. Sardinia in Italy). Peralkaline magmas likely form when fractional crystallization removes a high proportion of plagioclase relative to mafic minerals.

== See also ==
- Agpaitic rock
- Metaluminous rock
- Peraluminous rock
