= Comendite =

Hard, peralkaline igneous rock, a type of light blue grey rhyolite

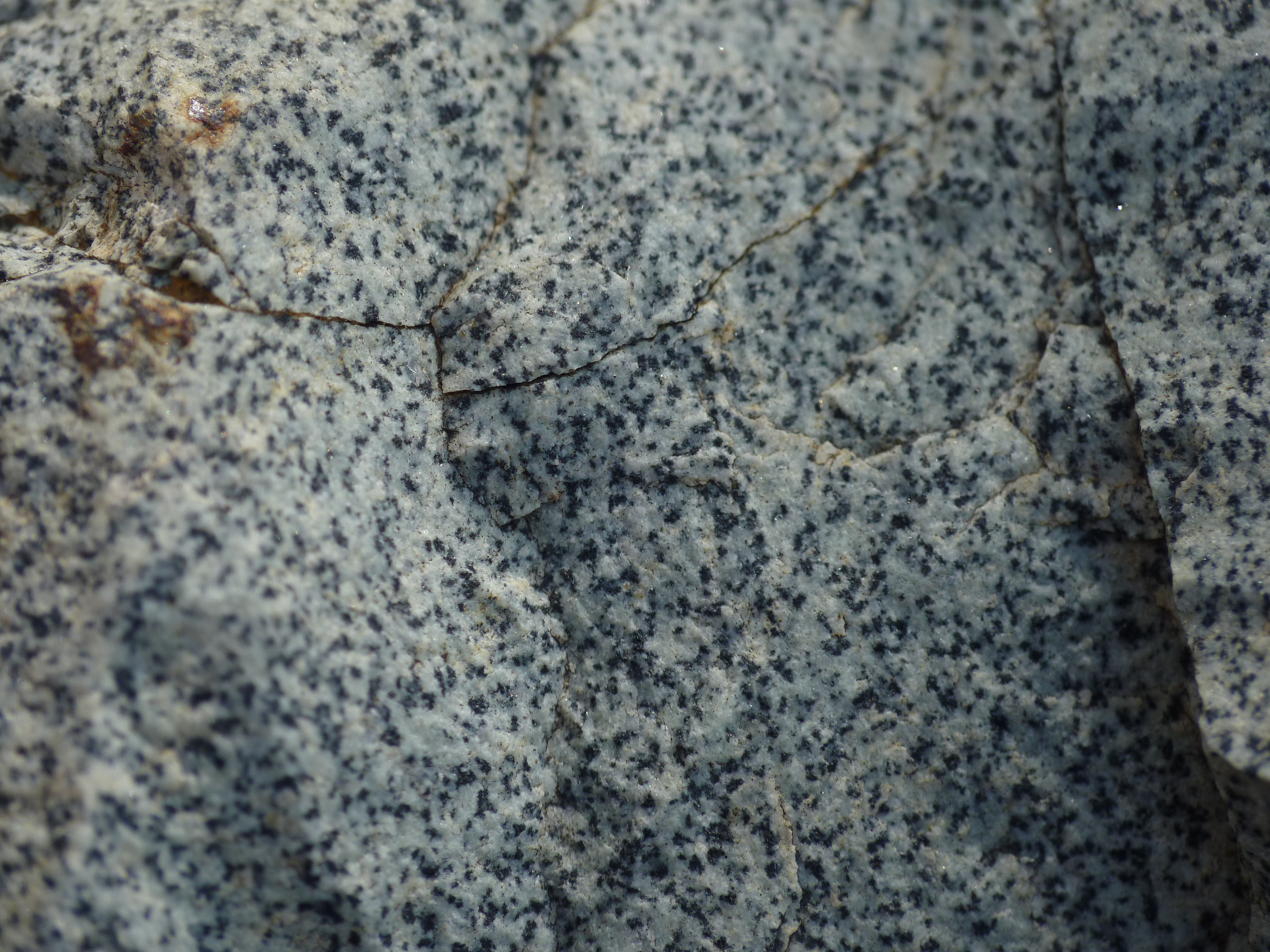
Comendite at Lookout 589 in the Glass House Mountains

Comendite is a hard, peralkaline igneous rock, a type of light blue grey rhyolite. Phenocrysts are sodic sanidine with minor albite and bipyramidal quartz. The blue colour is caused by very small crystals of riebeckite or arfvedsonite. The 1903 eruption of Changbaishan volcano in northeast China erupted comendite pumice.

Comendite derives its name from the area of Le Commende on San Pietro Island in Italy, where the rock type is found. Comendite also occurs in the Glass House Mountains of southeast Queensland, Australia, as well as in Sardinia, Corsica, Ascension Island, Ethiopia, Somalia and other areas of East Africa.
