= Desolation Lava Field =

Lava field in British Columbia, Canada

- Lava field
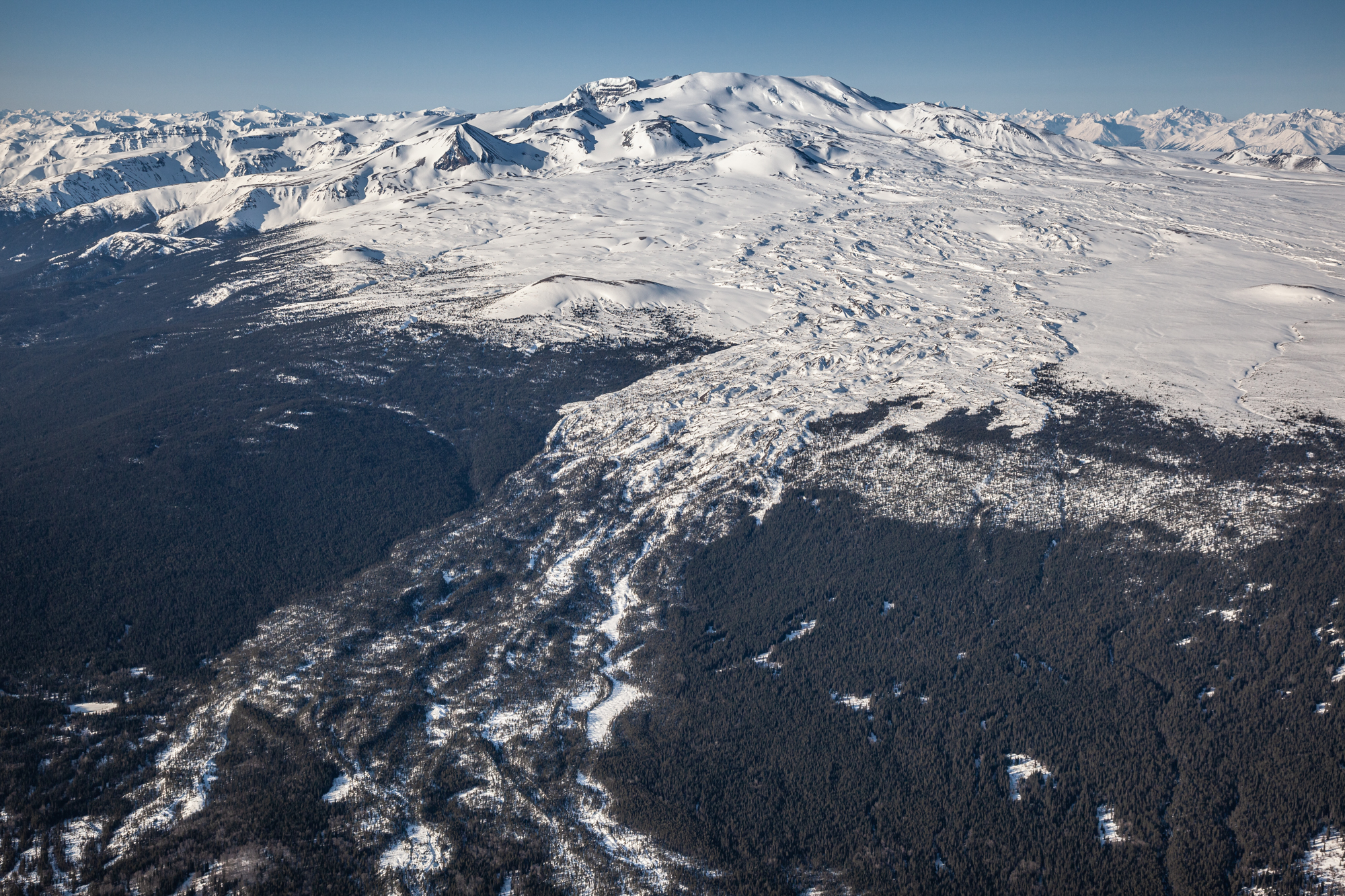
- Williams Cone lava flow from the northeast

- Location in British Columbia
- Interactive map of Desolation Lava Field
- Coordinates: 57.80°N 130.62°W
- Location: British Columbia, Canada
- Part of: Mount Edziza complex
- Age: Holocene
- Formed by: Volcanism
- Geology: Alkali basalt, hawaiite, picrite

Area
  - Total: More than 150 km^{2} (58 mi^{2})
- Elevation: 2,165 m (7,103 ft)
- Last eruption: Less than 2,000 years ago
- Designation: Mount Edziza Park

The Desolation Lava Field (DLF) is a volcanic field at Mount Edziza in British Columbia, Canada. It reaches an elevation of 2,165 metres (7,103 feet) on the Big Raven Plateau, but decreases to 820 m (2,690 ft) at Buckley Lake and 670 m (2,200 ft) in the Klastline River valley. The lava field covers more than 150 square kilometres (58 square miles) and contains 10 volcanic cones that range in elevation from nearly 2,135 to 1,430 m (7,005 to 4,692 ft). It is in Mount Edziza Provincial Park and is part of the Mount Edziza volcanic complex; the latter consists of several other volcanic landforms such as shield volcanoes, stratovolcanoes, lava domes and cinder cones. The DLF is the northern of two lava fields on the Big Raven Plateau, the other being the smaller Snowshoe Lava Field at the southern end of the plateau. Accessibility is by aircraft or by a network of horse trails from surrounding roads.

Volcanism in the DLF began during the Holocene with the eruptions of the Sleet and Storm cones, both of which issued lava flows. The Triplex Cones were formed by subsequent eruptions and issued lava flows more than 12 km (7.5 mi) long. Renewed volcanism created the Sidas and Twin cones, both of which differ from other cones in the DLF in that they are structurally complex. Subsequent volcanism created Moraine Cone, which was the source of a roughly 14 km (8.7 mi) long lava flow that temporarily dammed the Klastline River and Kakiddi Creek. The Eve and Williams cones were produced by the latest eruptions in the DLF, the latter of which issued a 13 km (8.1 mi) long lava flow that temporarily dammed the Klastline River. Radiocarbon dating of charred alpine willow twigs preserved in ejecta from Williams Cone suggests the latest eruption in the DLF occurred in the last 2,000 years.

== Geography ==
The Desolation Lava Field is located at the northern end of the Big Raven Plateau which is bounded by Mess Creek valley in the west, Kakiddi Creek valley in the east and the Klastline River valley in the north. This intermontane plateau is one of the principal physiographic features of the Mount Edziza volcanic complex, a group of overlapping shield volcanoes, stratovolcanoes, lava domes and cinder cones that have formed over the last 7.5 million years. The DLF reaches an elevation of 2,165 m (7,103 ft) on the plateau, but decreases in elevation to 820 m (2,690 ft) at Buckley Lake and 670 m (2,200 ft) in the Klastline River valley. It is one of two lava fields on the Big Raven Plateau, the other being the smaller Snowshoe Lava Field at the southern end of the plateau. Mount Edziza Provincial Park surrounds the DLF; it was established in 1972 to preserve the volcanic landscape.

=== Volcanic cones ===
The DLF consists of more than 150 km^{2} (58 mi^{2}) of blocky lava flows and wind-sculptured ash beds that were erupted from at least 10 cinder cones. Eve Cone near the middle of the lava field has an elevation of 1,740 m (5,710 ft) and is one of the most symmetrical and best preserved cinder cones in Canada. Moraine Cone is the southernmost cinder cone and is the highest of the Desolation vents, attaining an elevation of nearly 2,135 m (7,005 ft). Sidas Cone has an elevation of 1,540 m (5,050 ft) and is the northernmost cinder cone of the DLF. Sleet Cone, the southeasternmost eruptive centre of the DLF, has an elevation of 1,783 m (5,850 ft) and consists of two overlapping cones. Storm Cone is a glacially modified cone 2,135 m (7,005 ft) in elevation west-northwest of Moraine Cone.

The south-central portion of the DLF contains the Triplex Cones, a northwest-trending group of three cones attaining an elevation of 1,785 m (5,856 ft). Twin Cone is the easternmost eruptive centre of the DLF. It has an elevation of 1,430 m (4,690 ft) and consists of a breached cone; the breach contains a steep-sided lava dome. Williams Cone northeast of Moraine Cone is 2,100 m (6,900 ft) in elevation and is the largest cone in the DLF, containing a width of 1.2 km (0.75 mi) at its base. Most of the DLF cones are clustered near the northern base of Mount Edziza, an ice-covered stratovolcano attaining an elevation of 2,786 m (9,140 ft).

== Geology ==
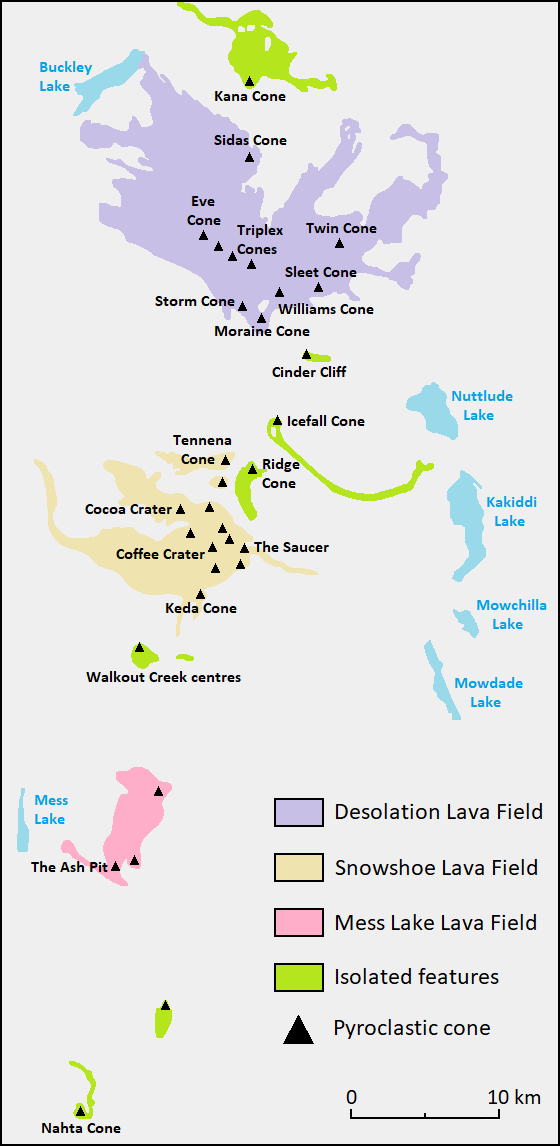
Geological map of the Big Raven Formation showing the extent of the Desolation Lava Field

The Desolation Lava Field is the largest Holocene volcanic feature on the Big Raven Plateau. Its lava flows, volcanic cones and tephra deposits consist mainly of alkali basalt and hawaiite of the Big Raven Formation, although minor picrite of this formation occurs at Sleet Cone and Storm Cone, the two oldest cones in the DLF. The Triplex Cones were formed after the Storm Cone eruption and consist mainly of alkali basalt. Alkali basalt and hawaiite compose the younger Sidas and Twin cones, both of which were formed by simultaneous lava fountaining from more than one vent. A subsequent eruption of alkali basalt and hawaiite created Moraine Cone, which has been almost completely destroyed by alpine glaciation. The youngest eruptions in the DLF created Eve Cone and Williams Cone; both cones are hawaiitic in composition. These cones and the associated lava flows and tephra deposits are approximal in age to the Snowshoe Lava Field, which issued from at least 12 separate eruptive centres.

The order of eruptions that formed the DLF are based on the degree of erosion and vegetation cover of the lava flows and volcanic cones, as well as the order in which the lava flows overlap. Individual volcanic cones have been given names ranging from DLF-1 to DLF-10; greater numbers indicate a younger age. Within the area of the DLF are four glacially modified Pleistocene cones of the Klastline Formation; none are considered part of the lava field due to their separation from the Big Raven Formation by a layer of glacial till. They are nevertheless geomorphologically and compositionally similar to those of the older Big Raven cones, all of which were probably formed during the same magmatic cycle of the Mount Edziza volcanic complex. Natural Resources Canada's Catalogue of Canadian volcanoes classified Kana Cone as part of the DLF whereas Canadian volcanologist Jack Souther classified Kana Cone as an isolated eruptive centre.

As a part of the Mount Edziza volcanic complex, the DLF lies within a broad area of volcanoes called the Northern Cordilleran Volcanic Province, which extends from northwestern British Columbia northwards through Yukon into easternmost Alaska. The dominant rocks that make up these volcanoes are alkali basalts and hawaiites, but nephelinites, basanites and peralkaline phonolites, trachytes and comendites are locally abundant. These rocks were deposited by volcanic eruptions from 20 million years ago to as recently as a few hundred years ago. Volcanism in the Northern Cordilleran Volcanic Province is thought to be due to rifting of the North American Cordillera, driven by changes in relative plate motion between the North American and Pacific plates.

=== Sleet Cone and Storm Cone ===
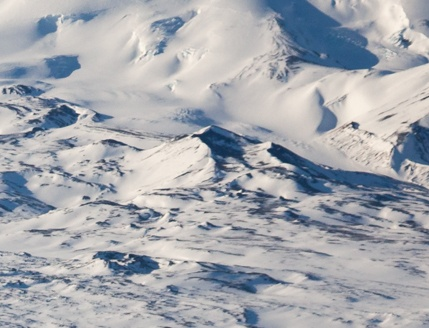
Storm Cone from the north

Sleet Cone (DLF-1) and Storm Cone (DLF-2) are rounded conical mounds that have been reduced by erosion. They contain only the gross features of their original form and are almost completely covered with soil. Lava flows from each cone travelled directly over glacial till and are overlain by sand, gravel and outwash deposits that are locally up to 9 m (30 ft) thick. Sleet Cone, the older of the two cones, consists mainly of spatter, tephra and bombs that have been oxidized red. A relatively small volume of lava issued from Sleet Cone; this lava cascaded down the north side of Pyramid Creek valley and flowed around the northern side of Klastline Cone which is part of the older Klastline Formation. In addition to glacial till, Storm Cone and its lava flows also overlie tuff breccia and minor pillow lava, suggesting that this cone may have erupted adjacent to a retreating glacier terminus. The lava flows issued from Storm Cone extend more than 10 km (6.2 mi) northwestward onto the gently sloping surface of the Big Raven Plateau.

=== Triplex Cones ===
The Triplex Cones (DLF-3, DLF-4, DLF-5) are three closely related eruptive centres that have been deeply eroded, such that they are in the form of low, circular mounds. They are covered with soil and overlie outwash gravel and ash from the Storm Cone eruption 3 km (1.9 mi) to the south; this suggests that the Triplex Cones are younger than Storm Cone. Lava flows from the cones extend more than 12 km (7.5 mi) to the northwest adjacent to the south shore of Buckley Lake and contain clinkery surfaces that are partially covered with soil and lichen. The two highest and youngest cones are breached to the north where tongues of frothy black basalt are present. In contrast, lava flows have completely buried the vent area of the lowest and oldest cone. The only remnants of the original structures of the Triplex Cones are low concentric ridges, which consist mainly of red, oxidized basalt in the form of agglutinated bombs and spatter.

=== Sidas Cone and Twin Cone ===
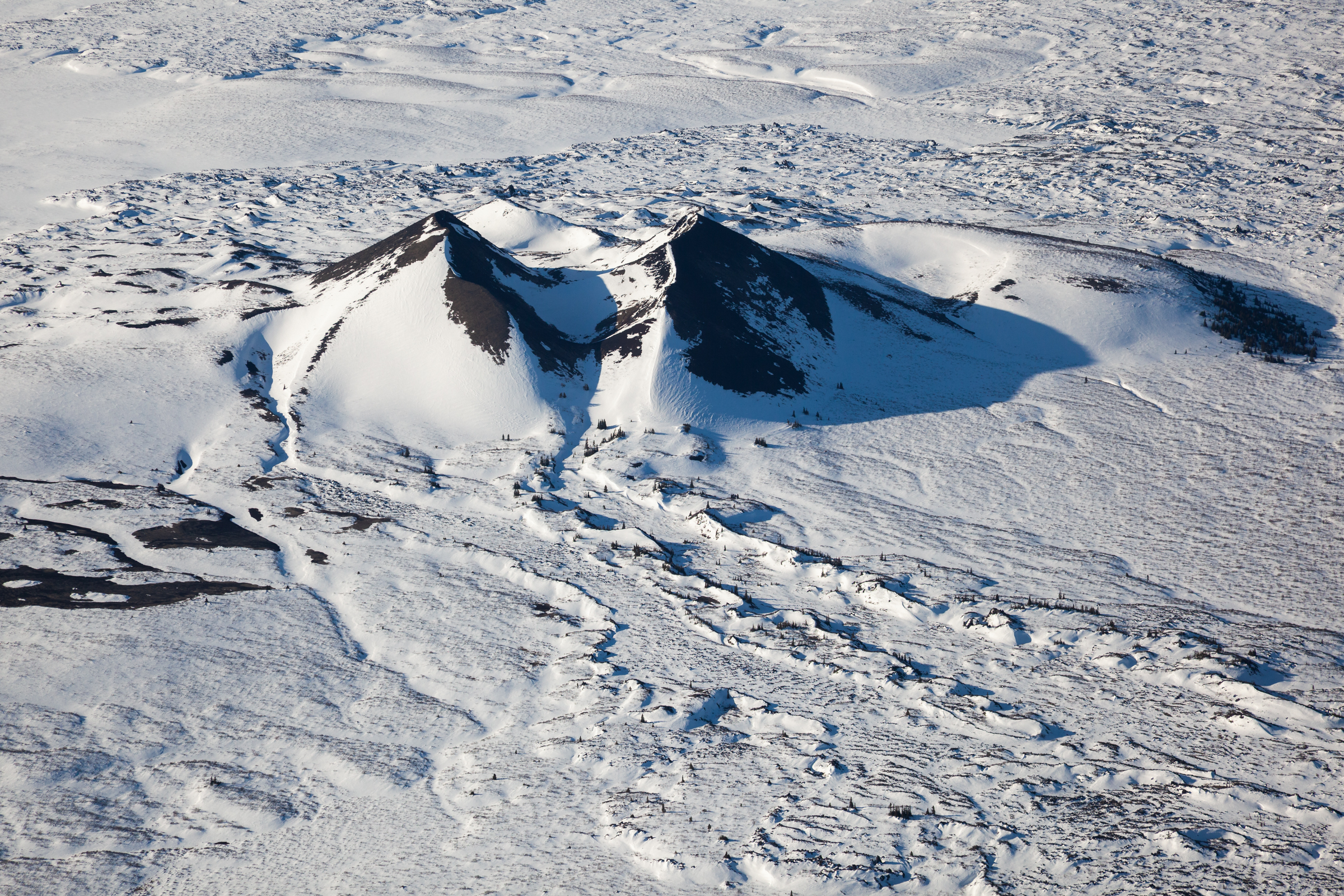
Sidas Cone with a glacially modified Klastline Formation cone to the right

Sidas Cone (DLF-6) and Twin Cone (DLF-7) are considered to be approximal in age due to their similar degree of vegetation cover and erosion. This is the only evidence for their age similarity since the lava flows from each cone do not overlap each other. Both cones are structurally complex, having issued basalt flows with clinkery surfaces. These basalt flows are relatively thin with low relief and are sparsely porphyritic; the phenocrysts consist of feldspar, olivine and pyroxene. The lava flows erupted from Twin Cone are isolated from older flows in the DLF and overlie glacial-fluvial gravel that postdates the Storm Cone eruption. In contrast, the Sidas Cone lava flows rest on those issued from the Triplex Cones.

Twin Cone is breached on its southeastern side where a steep-sided lava dome has developed. This dome, consisting of smooth, ropy basalt, contains 100 m (330 ft) wide and up to 10 m (33 ft) deep pit craters which are thought to have formed as a result of lava withdrawal from the main vent via lava tubes. Overlying the lava dome are 15 m (49 ft) high spatter cones whose summits contain 6–9 m (20–30 ft) deep symmetrical craters. Two overlapping volcanic edifices form Sidas Cone, each of which contains a summit crater. They are the products of simultaneous lava fountaining from neighbouring vents during the latter stages of the Sidas Cone eruption. Lava from Sidas Cone engulfed an area about 1.5 km (0.93 mi) wide and more than 8 km (5.0 mi) long, some of which ponded behind an older Klastline Formation cone adjacent to the southwestern flank of Sidas Cone.

=== Moraine Cone ===
Alpine glaciation has almost completely destroyed Moraine Cone (DLF-8); remnants are largely buried under moraine deposited by outlet glaciers of Mount Edziza's ice cap. The only parts of Moraine Cone that project beyond the subsequent glacial cover are its northwestern margin and its breached northern flank where agglutinated bombs and spatter are exposed, as well as ropy lava. Lava from the cone extends roughly 14 km (8.7 mi) to the northeast where it had travelled down the northeastern side of the Big Raven Plateau into the Kakiddi Creek and Klastline River valleys. The existence of lacustrine silt beds in small terraces upstream from the lava in these valleys suggests that Kakiddi Creek and the Klastline River were both temporarily dammed. Near Moraine Cone, the lava is separated from younger volcanic deposits of Williams Cone by overlying gravel and sand outwash.

=== Eve Cone and Williams Cone ===
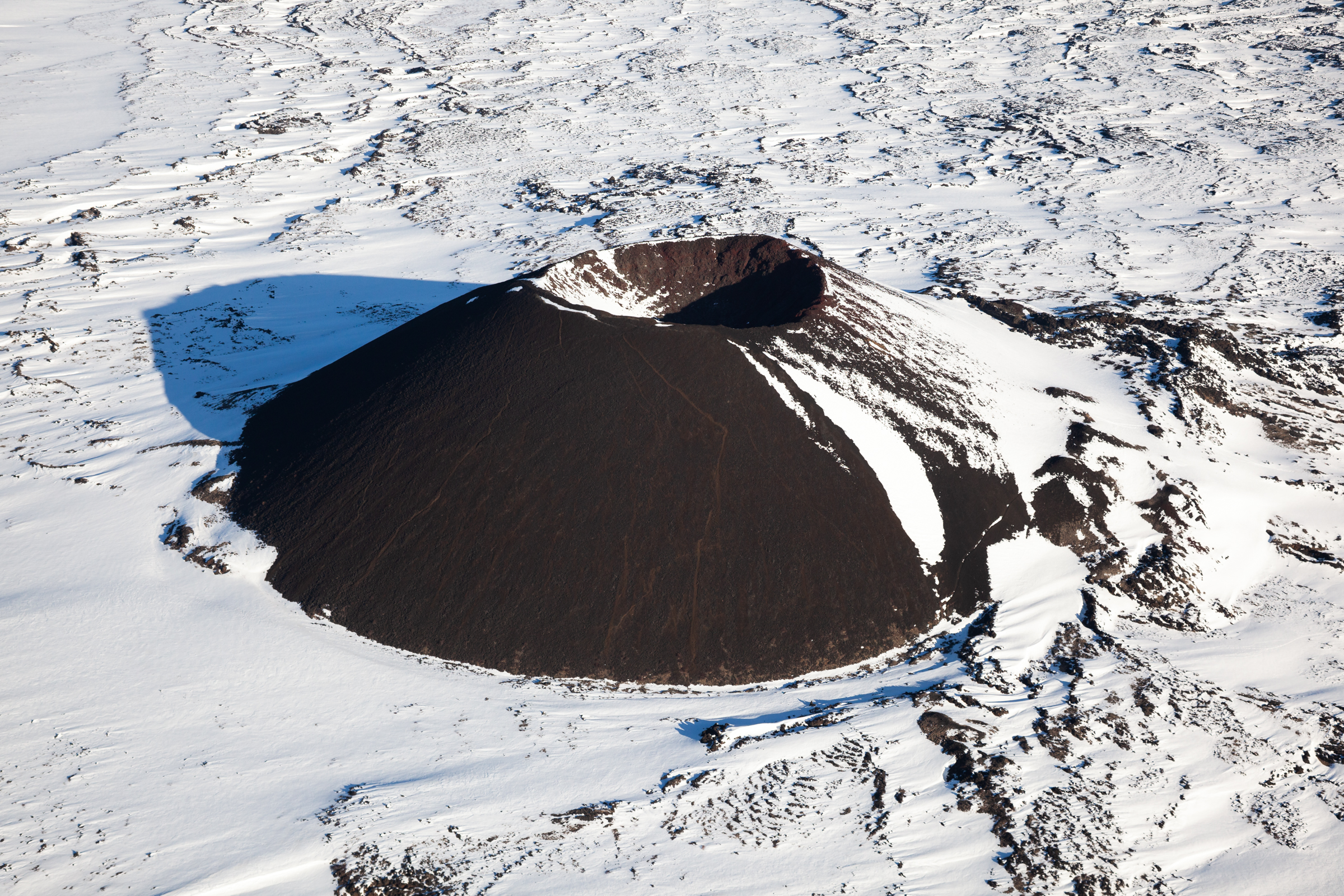
Eve Cone from the southeast

The youngest DLF cones, Eve Cone (DLF-9) and Williams Cone (DLF-10), issued roughly the same volume of lava. Relatively fine, dark grey bombs and cinders cover the northern half of Eve Cone whereas coarser, clinkery spatter is exposed in the more deeply eroded southern half of the cone. In contrast to Williams Cone whose surroundings are at least still partially covered with fine ash from its eruption, ash from the Eve Cone eruption has completely eroded away from the surrounding landscape; this indicates that Eve Cone is older than Williams Cone. The symmetrical structure of Eve Cone suggests that it was formed by a towering, vertical lava fountain. Lava from the cone engulfed an area about 6 km (3.7 mi) wide and 12 km (7.5 mi) long. It overlies lava from the Triplex Cones and abuts with lava from Sidas Cone.

Williams Cone consists of spatter and bombs that erupted from several vents. Cinders and ash from the volcano were blown eastward by a strong westerly wind during eruption and deposited on the eastern side of the cone. This ejecta extends 9.5 km (5.9 mi) east across the Big Raven Plateau to the valley of Kakiddi Creek where it is in the form of 1-to-3-millimetre-wide (0.039-to-0.118-inch) particles. Formation of the cone was followed by collapse of its western flank near the end of the eruption to form a steep-sided amphitheatre. Lava from the breached central crater and vents around the base of the cone engulfed an area about 1.5 km (0.93 mi) wide and 13 km (8.1 mi) long. It travelled northeast down the northern side of the Big Raven Plateau into the valley of the Klastline River where it formed a temporary lava dam. Radiocarbon dating of charred alpine willow twigs preserved in ejecta from Williams Cone suggests that its eruption occurred in 630 CE ± 150 years.

== Accessibility ==
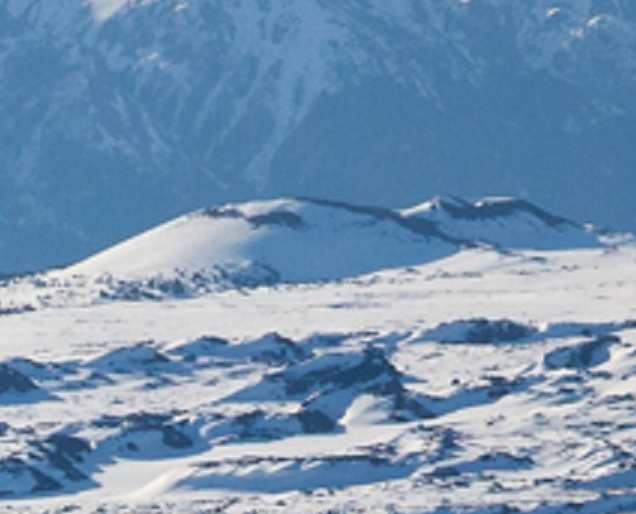
Twin Cone from the northwest

As a part of the Mount Edziza volcanic complex, the DLF is in a remote location with no established road access. The closest roads are the Stewart–Cassiar Highway to the east and the Telegraph Creek Road to the northwest; both come within 40 km (25 mi) of the lava field. Extending from these roads are horse trails that provide access to the Mount Edziza volcanic complex. From Telegraph Creek, the Buckley Lake Trail extends about 15 km (9.3 mi) southeast along Mess Creek and Three Mile Lake. It then traverses about 15 km (9.3 mi) northeast along Dagaichess Creek and Stinking Lake to the northeastern end of Buckley Lake. Here, it meets with the Klastline River Trail and the Buckley Lake to Mowdade Lake Route.

To the east, the roughly 50 km (31 mi) long Klastline River Trail begins at the community of Iskut on the Stewart–Cassiar Highway; it extends northwest and west along the Klastline River for much of its length. The trail enters Mount Edziza Provincial Park at about 25 km (16 mi) where Kakiddi Creek drains into the Klastline River. After entering Mount Edziza Provincial Park, it traverses northwest along the Klastline River for about 10 km (6.2 mi) and then crosses the river north of the Big Raven Plateau. From there, it traverses west for about 5 km (3.1 mi) to the northeastern end of Buckley Lake where it meets with the Buckley Lake Trail and Buckley Lake to Mowdade Lake Route.

The Buckley Lake to Mowdade Lake Route traverses south from Buckley Lake along Buckley Creek and gradually climbs onto the northern end of the Big Raven Plateau where Eve Cone and Sidas Cone are visible along the route. Buckley Lake is large enough to be used by float-equipped aircraft, but landing on this lake with a private aircraft requires a letter of authorization from the BC Parks Stikine Senior Park Ranger. Alpine Lakes Air and BC Yukon Air are the only air charter companies permitted to provide access to this area via aircraft.

== See also ==
- Volcanism of the Mount Edziza volcanic complex
- List of volcanic fields
