= Williams Cone =

Cinder cone in British Columbia, Canada

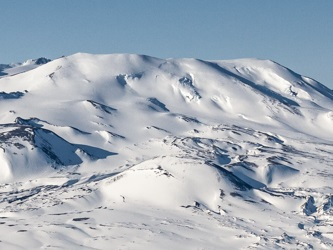
- Mount Edziza with Williams Cone below

Highest point
- Elevation: 2,100 m (6,900 ft)
- Coordinates: 57°46′49″N 130°35′59″W

Naming
- Etymology: Hank Williams
- Defining authority: BC Geographical Names office in Victoria, British Columbia

Geography
- Location within British Columbia
- Location in Mount Edziza Provincial Park
- Country: Canada
- Province: British Columbia
- District: Cassiar Land District
- Protected area: Mount Edziza Provincial Park
- Parent range: Tahltan Highland
- Topo map: NTS 104G15 Buckley Lake

Geology
- Formed by: Volcanism
- Mountain type: Cinder cone
- Rock type: Hawaiite
- Volcanic field: Desolation Lava Field
- Last eruption: 630 CE ± 150 years

Williams Cone is a cinder cone on the northeastern flank of Mount Edziza in Cassiar Land District of northwestern British Columbia, Canada. It has an elevation of 2,100 metres (6,900 feet) and is one of several volcanic cones in the Desolation Lava Field at the northern end of the Big Raven Plateau. Situated southeast of the community of Telegraph Creek, it lies in Mount Edziza Provincial Park, one of the largest provincial parks in British Columbia. A roughly 13-kilometre-long (8.1-mile) lava flow travelled down the northern side of the Big Raven Plateau from Williams Cone around 630 CE and temporarily dammed the Klastline River. Ejecta from an eruption column was blown eastward by a strong westerly wind, some of which was deposited on the eastern flank of the cone.

Williams Cone is part of the Mount Edziza volcanic complex, which consists of a wide variety of landforms such as shield volcanoes, stratovolcanoes, lava domes and cinder cones. A large, steep-sided feature on the western side of Williams Cone resembles an amphitheatre and contains a smaller, nested cinder cone. Tsecha Creek originates adjacent to Williams Cone and is part of the Stikine River watershed. Surrounding Williams Cone are a number of other volcanic features, including the Eve, Moraine, Sidas, Sleet, Storm, Twin and Triplex cones, all of which are also part of the Desolation Lava Field. Access is via horse trails from Telegraph Creek and Iskut, although landing on Buckley Lake with float-equipped aircraft also allows access to Williams Cone.

== Name and etymology ==
Williams Cone was officially named on January 2, 1980. Its name was adopted on the National Topographic System map 104G/15 after being submitted to the BC Geographical Names office by the Geological Survey of Canada. In his 1992 report The Late Cenozoic Mount Edziza Volcanic Complex, British Columbia, Jack Souther called Williams Cone DLF-10. DLF is an acronym for the Desolation Lava Field whereas 10 refers to Williams Cone being the tenth youngest eruptive centre in the Desolation Lava Field.

Williams Cone is named after Hank Williams, a man who was killed along with Johnny Edzerza in an avalanche near the cone in or before 1974. The avalanche occurred during a vicious snowstorm that had blown in from the north as Williams, Edzerza and his wife Eve Edzerza were travelling via dog sled to Iskut from Telegraph Creek 72 km (45 mi) to the west. Eve Edzerza was the only survivor and directed a rescue team to the site of the accident. Williams and the Edzerzas were Tahltans, the local First Nations people whose traditional territory covers an area of more than 93,500 km^{2} (36,100 mi^{2}).

== Geography ==
Williams Cone is located in Cassiar Land District of northwestern British Columbia, Canada, about 20 km (12 mi) southeast of Buckley Lake on the northeastern flank of Mount Edziza. It has an elevation of 2,100 m (6,900 ft) and is one of several volcanic cones in the Desolation Lava Field. This more than 150 km^{2} (58 mi^{2}) lava field is one of the largest areas of Holocene lava flows of the Mount Edziza volcanic complex (MEVC). The MEVC consists of a group of overlapping shield volcanoes, stratovolcanoes, lava domes and cinder cones that have formed over the last 7.5 million years.

Williams Cone rises more than 275 m (902 ft) above the surrounding terrain. It has a basal width of 1.2 km (0.75 mi), making it the largest cinder cone in the Desolation Lava Field. A large, steep-sided feature on its western side resembles an amphitheatre and contains a smaller cinder cone. Adjacent to Williams Cone is the head of Tsecha Creek, which is covered with loose ejecta from the cone. Tsecha Creek is a tributary of Kakiddi Creek. This north-flowing stream enters the Klastline River, which flows into the Stikine River. Williams Cone is therefore within the Stikine River watershed along with the rest of the MEVC.

Apart from Mount Edziza itself, which is a 2,786 m (9,140 ft) high stratovolcano, Williams Cone is surrounded by a number of other volcanic features. Extending about 6 km (3.7 mi) to the northwest is a linear group of four volcanic cones. Eve Cone lies at the northwesternmost end of this line, whereas the three Triplex Cones are between the Eve and Williams cones. The Sleet, Storm and Moraine cones are about 3 km (1.9 mi) east, southwest and south-southwest of Williams Cone, respectively. About 5 km (3.1 mi) to the northeast is Twin Cone, whereas Sidas Cone is about 9 km (5.6 mi) north of Williams Cone. About 3 km (1.9 mi) southeast of Williams Cone is The Pyramid on the northeastern flank of Mount Edziza. All of these features are part of the Desolation Lava Field at the northern end of the Big Raven Plateau with the exception of The Pyramid, which is separated from its surroundings by a thick apron of active talus.

Williams Cone lies in Mount Edziza Provincial Park southeast of the community of Telegraph Creek. With an area of 2,661.8 km^{2} (1,027.7 mi^{2}), it is one of the largest provincial parks in British Columbia. Mount Edziza Provincial Park was established in 1972 to preserve the volcanic landscape. It includes not only the Mount Edziza area, but also the Spectrum Range to the south, which are separated by Raspberry Pass. Mount Edziza Provincial Park is in the Tahltan Highland, a southeast-trending upland area extending along the western side of the Stikine Plateau.

== Geology ==
=== Background ===
As a part of the MEVC, Williams Cone lies within a broad area of volcanoes called the Northern Cordilleran Volcanic Province, which extends from northwestern British Columbia northwards through Yukon into easternmost Alaska. The dominant rocks that make up these volcanoes are alkali basalts and hawaiites, but nephelinites, basanites and peralkaline (Note: Peralkaline rocks are magmatic rocks that have a higher ratio of sodium and potassium to aluminum.) phonolites, trachytes and comendites are locally abundant. These rocks were deposited by volcanic eruptions from 20 million years ago to as recently as a few hundred years ago. Volcanism in the Northern Cordilleran Volcanic Province is thought to be due to rifting of the North American Cordillera, driven by changes in relative plate motion between the North American and Pacific plates.

=== Formation ===
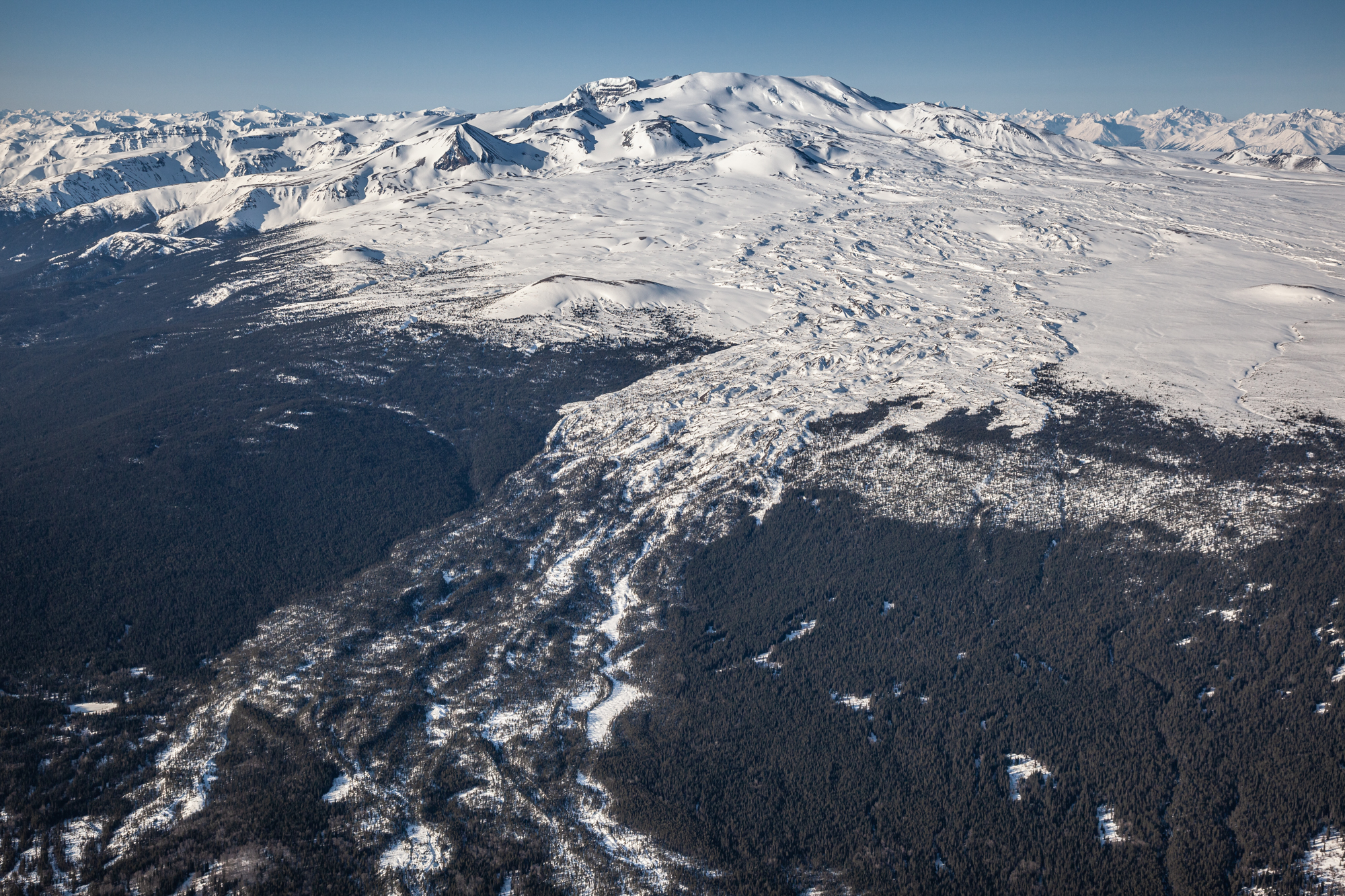
Williams Cone lava flow from the northeast

Williams Cone was formed by a volcanic eruption that involved the build up of lava bombs and spatter around several vents. An eruption column was blown eastward by a strong westerly wind, which resulted in the deposition of cinders and ash on the eastern flank of the cone. The ejecta from this eruption column extends 9.5 km (5.9 mi) east across the Big Raven Plateau to the valley of Kakiddi Creek. In Kakiddi Valley, the ejecta is in the form of 1-to-3-millimetre-wide (0.039-to-0.118-inch) particles. It increases in both grain size and thickness towards Williams Cone where 5–20 mm (0.20–0.79 in) wide cinders form beds up to 4.5 m (15 ft) thick. Small streams northeast of Williams Cone have exposed former soil underlying ejecta from the volcano.

The formation of Williams Cone was followed by collapse of its western flank near the end of the eruption to form the steep-sided amphitheatre. Some of the debris from this collapse accumulated in mounds west of the amphitheatre, but most of it was rafted away by lava. The lava issued from the breached central crater of Williams Cone, as well as from vents around the base of the cone. Streams of lava from these vents merged to form an approximately 1.5 km (0.93 mi) wide and 13 km (8.1 mi) long compound flow. This lava flow is one of the largest in the Desolation Lava Field. It travelled northeast down the northern side of the Big Raven Plateau into the Klastline Valley where it formed a temporary lava dam.

Williams Cone and its eruptive products consist mainly of hawaiite. They are part of the Big Raven Formation and are the most recent additions to the Desolation Lava Field. Radiocarbon dating of charred alpine willow twigs preserved in ejecta suggests that the Williams Cone eruption occurred sometime around 630 CE. Although the cone is the youngest in the Desolation Lava Field, it may not be the youngest feature of the entire MEVC; The Ash Pit on the southern side of the Kitsu Plateau may be younger. The eruption that formed Williams Cone was also followed by at least two younger eruptions of the MEVC that remain undated. Future eruptions from the cone are unlikely because it is a monogenetic volcano; such volcanoes experience only a single eruptive phase and are short-lived. Monogenetic volcanoes can remain active from days to years but are fed by a relatively small amount of magma.

=== Basement ===
Williams Cone overlies the Edziza, Ice Peak, Nido and Raspberry formations, all of which are older geological formations of the MEVC. The Edziza Formation is the youngest; it consists mainly of Pleistocene trachyte that is in the form of pyroclastic breccia, lahar and ash flow deposits. Underlying the Edziza Formation is Pleistocene alkali basalt of the Ice Peak Formation, which is in the form of subaerial lava flows. This formation is underlain by alkali basalt flows of the Tenchen Member of the Nido Formation; they were erupted from multiple volcanoes during the Pliocene. The oldest MEVC formation underlying the cone is the Raspberry Formation, which consists of Miocene alkali basalt and minor hawaiite and mugearite. These volcanic rocks are mainly in the form of lava flows, flow breccias and agglutinate. Underlying the Raspberry Formation are sedimentary, volcanic or metamorphic rocks of the Stikinia terrane, which are Paleozoic and Mesozoic in age.

== Accessibility ==
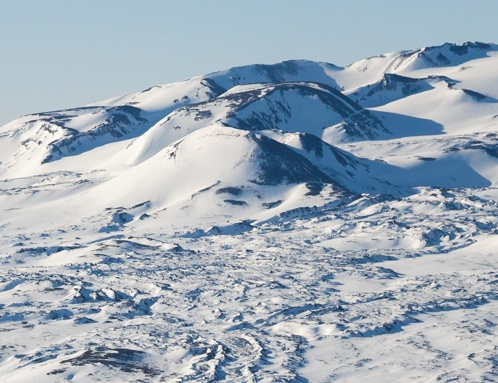
Williams Cone from the north

Williams Cone is in a remote location with no established road access. The closest roads are the Stewart–Cassiar Highway to the east and the Telegraph Creek Road to the northwest; both come within 40 km (25 mi) of the cone. Extending from these roads are horse trails that provide access to the MEVC. From Telegraph Creek, the Buckley Lake Trail extends about 15 km (9.3 mi) southeast along Mess Creek and Three Mile Lake. It then traverses about 15 km (9.3 mi) northeast along Dagaichess Creek and Stinking Lake to the northeastern end of Buckley Lake. Here, it meets with the Klastline River Trail and the Buckley Lake to Mowdade Lake Route, the latter of which ascends onto the gently sloping northern side of the plateau.

To the east, the roughly 50 km (31 mi) long Klastline River Trail begins at the community of Iskut on the Stewart–Cassiar Highway; it extends northwest and west along the Klastline River for much of its length. The trail enters Mount Edziza Provincial Park at about 25 km (16 mi) where Kakiddi Creek drains into the Klastline River. After entering Mount Edziza Provincial Park, it traverses northwest along the Klastline River for about 10 km (6.2 mi) and then crosses the river north of the Big Raven Plateau. From there, it traverses west for about 5 km (3.1 mi) to the northeastern end of Buckley Lake where it meets with the Buckley Lake Trail and the Buckley Lake to Mowdade Lake Route.

The Buckley Lake to Mowdade Lake Route traverses south from Buckley Lake along Buckley Creek and gradually climbs onto the northern end of the Big Raven Plateau where Williams Cone is located. Buckley Lake northwest of Williams Cone is large enough to be used by float-equipped aircraft. However, landing on this lake with a private aircraft requires a letter of authorization from the BC Parks Stikine Senior Park Ranger. Alpine Lakes Air and BC Yukon Air are the only air charter companies permitted to provide access to this area via aircraft.

== See also ==
- List of cinder cones
- List of Northern Cordilleran volcanoes
- List of volcanoes in Canada
- Volcanism of the Mount Edziza volcanic complex
