= Big Raven Formation =

Geological formation in British Columbia, Canada

- Stratigraphic range: Quaternary; 0.020–0 Ma
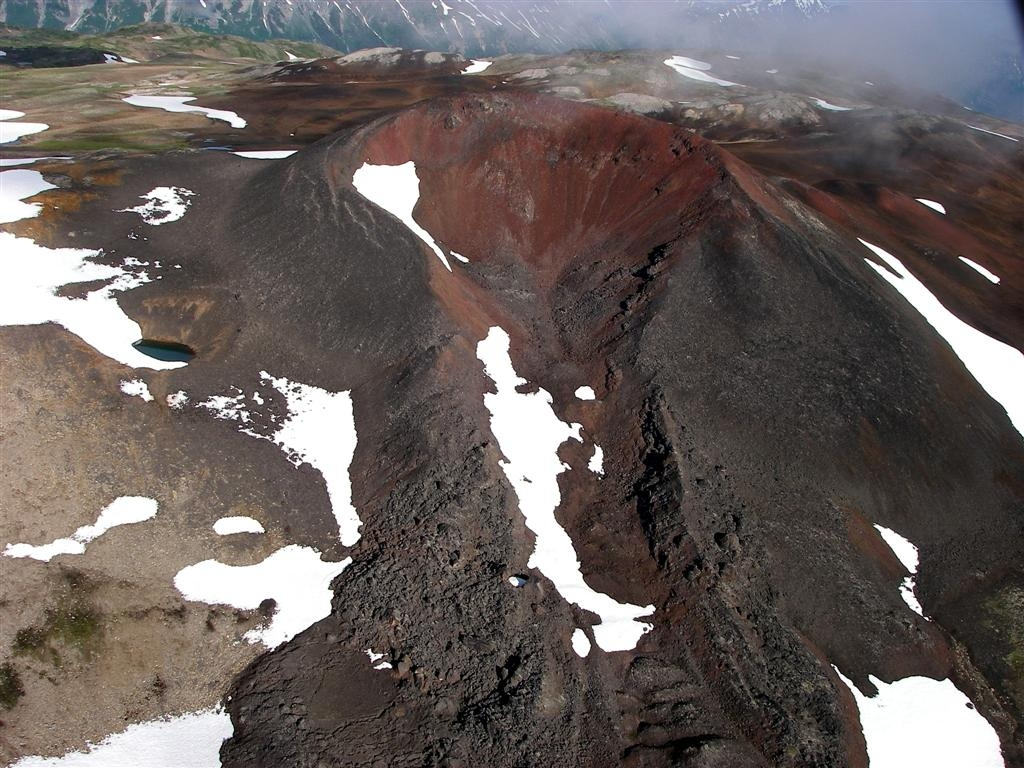
- Nahta Cone of the Big Raven Formation
- Type: Geological formation
- Unit of: Mount Edziza volcanic complex
- Sub-units: Sheep Track Member
- Overlies: Nido Formation, Spectrum Formation, Raspberry Formation, Armadillo Formation, Klastline Formation, Ice Peak Formation, Edziza Formation, Kakiddi Formation

Lithology
- Primary: Alkali basalt, hawaiite
- Other: Trachyte

Location
- Coordinates: Big Raven Plateau; 57°42′59″N 130°45′06″W Arctic Lake Plateau; 57°17′59″N 130°46′06″W Kitsu Plateau; 57°27′59″N 130°45′06″W
- Region: British Columbia
- Country: Canada

Type section
- Named by: Souther et al., 1984
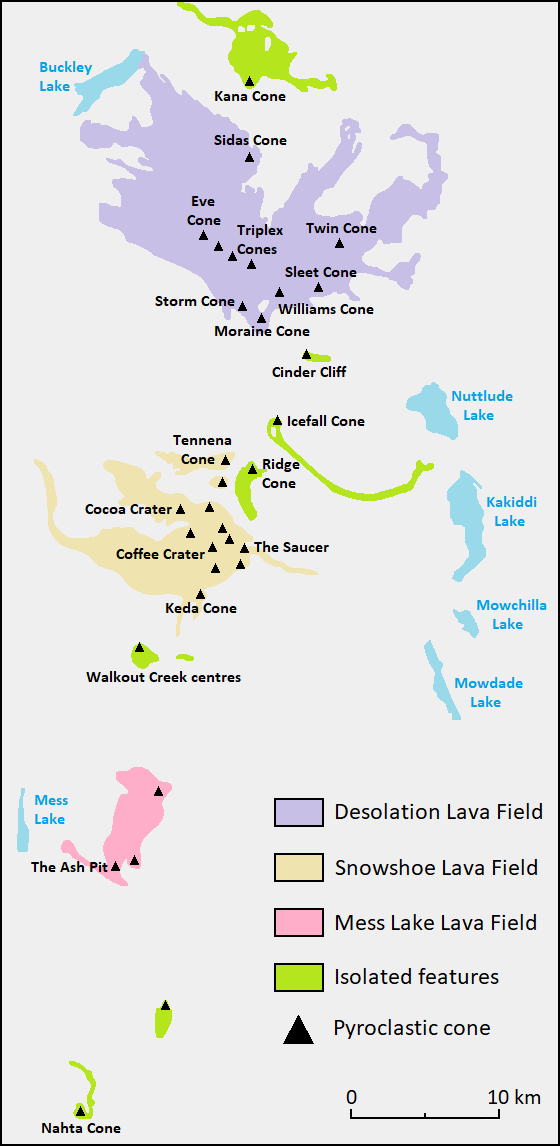
- Geological map of the Big Raven Formation

The Big Raven Formation is a stratigraphic unit of Quaternary age in northwestern British Columbia, Canada. It is the youngest and least voluminous geological formation of the Mount Edziza volcanic complex (MEVC); it overlies at least eight older formations of this volcanic complex. The main volcanic rocks of the Big Raven Formation are alkali basalts and hawaiites, although a small volume of trachyte comprises the Sheep Track Member. These rocks were deposited by volcanic eruptions in the last 20,000 years during the latest magmatic cycle of the MEVC. Alkali basalt and hawaiite are in the form of lava flows and small volcanic cones while trachyte of the Sheep Track Member is mainly in the form of volcanic ejecta which covers an area of about 40 square kilometres (15 square miles).

The Big Raven Formation is widespread throughout the MEVC, occurring on or adjacent to the Arctic Lake, Big Raven and Kitsu plateaus. Two lava fields of the Big Raven Formation occur on the Big Raven Plateau which in total contain at least 22 separate vents that issued lava flows. At least four isolated Big Raven vents occur on the eastern flank of Mount Edziza and on the extreme northern slope of the Big Raven Plateau. The Kitsu Plateau contains a much smaller Big Raven lava field near the edge of an escarpment; at least three separate vents are in this lava field. Two isolated Big Raven vents on and adjacent to the Arctic Lake Plateau produced lava flows, as did two isolated Big Raven vents in Walkout Creek valley. Most Big Raven vents are marked by a cone of pyroclastic rocks.

== Stratigraphy ==
Stratigraphically, the Big Raven Formation is the youngest unit of the late Cenozoic Mount Edziza volcanic complex in northwestern British Columbia, Canada. It contains one sub-unit called the Sheep Track Member which is lithologically distinct from the rest of the Big Raven Formation. Initially, the Big Raven Formation and the Sheep Track Member were recognized as two separate geological formations by Jack Souther, Richard Lee Armstrong and J. Harakal in 1984; both formations were grouped together in their descriptions and mapping. By 1988, the Sheep Track Formation had been reassigned as a member of the Big Raven Formation; its recognition as a geological formation has since been abandoned. The Big Raven Formation is the least voluminous geological formation of the MEVC, consisting of 1.7 km^{3} (0.41 mi^{3}) of volcanic material.

The Big Raven Formation overlies the Klastline, Kakiddi, Edziza, Ice Peak, Spectrum, Nido, Armadillo and Raspberry formations, all of which are older units of the MEVC. It is separated from the Klastline Formation by a layer of moraine that was deposited by retreating glaciers at the end of the last glacial period. The Big Raven Formation overlies the Ice Peak Formation north and south of Mount Edziza. An outlier of the Big Raven Formation is separated from the Spectrum Formation by a thick layer of unconsolidated felsenmeer and talus. Another outlier of the Big Raven Formation overlies the Nido Formation east of Mount Edziza. Big Raven breccia on the plateau surface east of Mess Lake directly overlies trachyte of the Armadillo Formation. At the mouth of Tennaya Creek valley on the eastern side of the Mount Edziza volcanic complex, the Big Raven Formation overlies trachyte of the Kakiddi Formation.

== Age and lithology ==
The exact age of the Big Raven Formation is unknown, but its oldest rocks were probably deposited during the Last Glacial Maximum at least 20,000 years ago which corresponds with the beginning of the latest magmatic cycle of the MEVC. A Holocene age for its younger rocks has not been wholly determined from geologic dating, but rather from the lack of evidence suggesting that they were overridden by the Cordilleran Ice Sheet which retreated from the area about 11,000 years ago. Tephrochronological, radiocarbon and fission track dating has yielded ages of 6520 BCE ± 200 years, 750 BCE ± 100 years, 610 CE ± 150 years and 950 CE ± 6000 years for some Big Raven volcanic rocks at Mount Edziza.

Alkali basalt and hawaiite are the main volcanic rocks comprising the Big Raven Formation, having erupted from at least 30 vents along the entire north–south trending axis of the MEVC. They are in the form of lava flows and pyroclastic cones which largely comprise two lava fields on the northern and western flanks of Mount Edziza and Ice Peak, respectively. Isolated pyroclastic cones and lava flows occur at the northern and southern extremities of the Big Raven Formation, as well as on the eastern flank of Mount Edziza and along Walkout Creek. Trachyte represents a small volume of the Big Raven Formation and mainly comprises air-fall pumice of the Sheep Track Member.

== Locations ==
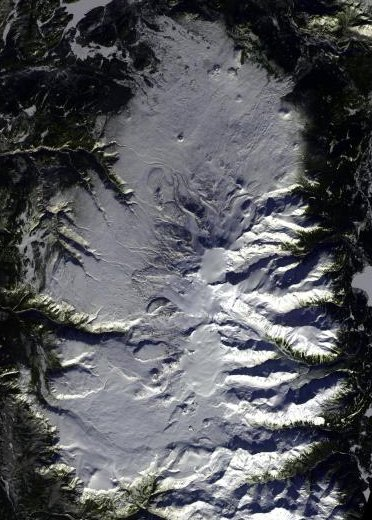
The Big Raven Plateau contains the largest extent of Big Raven Formation lava flows and cones

The Big Raven Formation is widespread throughout the MEVC, occurring on or adjacent to the Kitsu, Arctic Lake and Big Raven plateaus. The Big Raven Plateau is the main physiographic feature at the northern end of the MEVC; its dominant feature is Mount Edziza which rises from the middle of the plateau. Further south near the middle of the MEVC is the Kitsu Plateau which is bounded on the north by Raspberry Pass, on the west by the Mess Creek Escarpment and on the south by the Spectrum Range. The Arctic Lake Plateau is a nearly flat upland at the southern end of the MEVC between the Spectrum Range to the east and Mess Creek valley to the west.

=== Big Raven Plateau ===
The Big Raven Plateau contains the Desolation Lava Field on the northern flank of Mount Edziza which consists of several lava flows that issued from at least 10 separate Big Raven vents. Another area of Big Raven lava flows called the Snowshoe Lava Field occurs on the western flank of Ice Peak; it issued from at least 12 separate vents. The Sheep Track Member overlies much of the southern end of the Big Raven Plateau, including the Snowshoe Lava Field. At least three Big Raven vents occur on the eastern flank of Mount Edziza and comprise another volcanic zone called the east slope centres. An isolated Big Raven vent called Kana Cone occurs on the extreme northern slope of the plateau while two cinder cones occur on the southern slope of the plateau in Walkout Creek valley.

==== Desolation Lava Field ====
Blocky basalt flows, wind-sculptured ash beds and cinder cones comprise the more than 150-square-kilometre (58-square-mile) Desolation Lava Field. This is the largest lava field of the Big Raven Formation, as well as one of the youngest volcanic features on Mount Edziza. Sleet Cone and Storm Cone, the oldest cones in the Desolation Lava Field, were sources of lava flows that directly travelled over glacial till. The Triplex Cones issued lava that flowed to near the south shore of Buckley Lake more than 12 kilometres (7.5 miles) to the northwest. Sidas Cone and Twin Cone are complex volcanic piles resulting from simultaneous, multi-vent lava fountaining. Both cones issued relatively thin clinkery-surfaced basalt flows that are sparsely porphyritic. Moraine Cone was the source of a lava flow that travelled northeast into Kakiddi Valley near its junction with the Klastline River. The two youngest cinder cones in the Desolation Lava Field, Eve Cone and Williams Cone, produced basaltic lava that flowed to Buckley Lake and the Klastline River, respectively. A radiocarbon date of 610 CE ± 150 years has been obtained from willow twigs preserved in ejecta from Williams Cone.

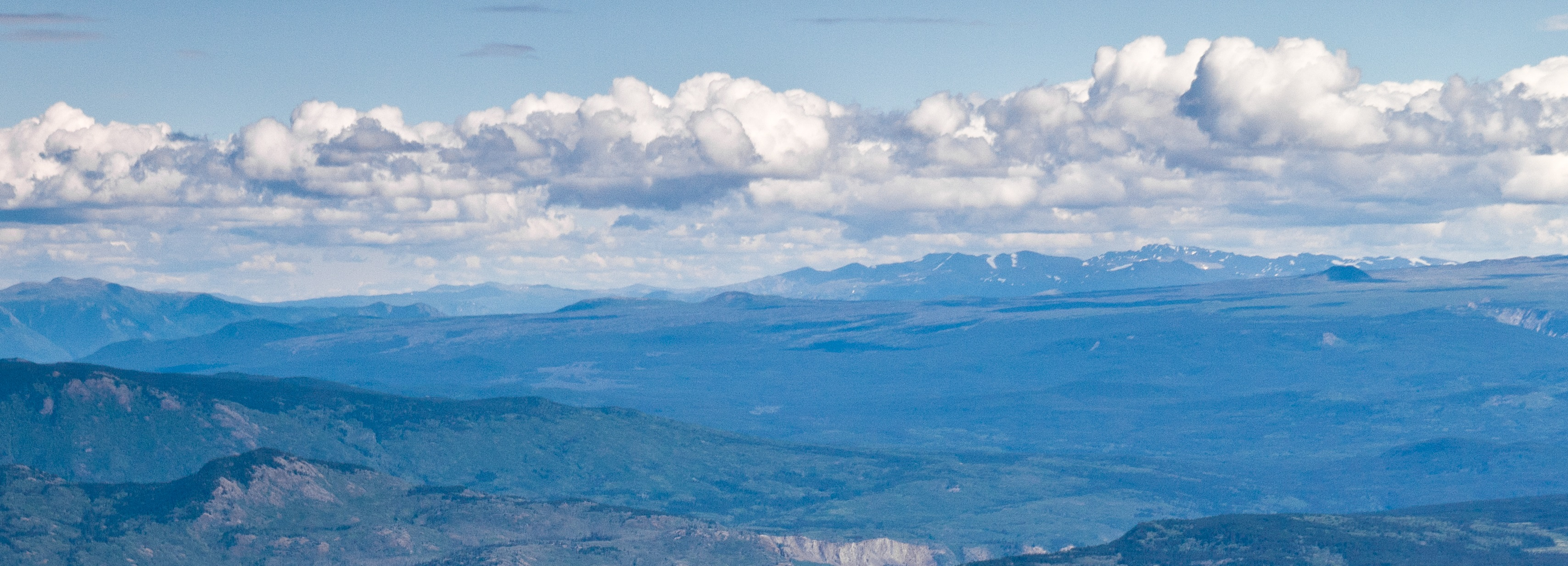
Panoramic view of the Big Raven Plateau; Eve Cone is visible as a small dark hill to the right

Some of the lava flows comprising the Desolation Lava Field issued from vents adjacent to the northern trim line of Mount Edziza's summit ice cap where meltwater interacted with the erupting lava to form tuff rings. These tuff rings composed of quenched breccia later transitioned into normal subaerial cinder cones as the progressing eruptions displaced ice and meltwater. The more than 12 km (7.5 mi) long lava flow from Williams Cone formed a temporary dam across the Klastline River at its distal end. Lava from Moraine Cone temporarily dammed Kakiddi Creek and the Klastline River, both of which have since etched new channels around or through the lava flow. The presence of lacustrine silt in small terraces upstream from the lava flow suggests that both streams were dammed long enough to form temporary lakes.

==== Snowshoe Lava Field ====
The Snowshoe Lava Field is a group of volcanic cones and blocky basalt flows similar in age to the Desolation Lava Field. It covers an area of about 40 square kilometres (15 square miles) and is mostly covered over by air-fall pumice of the Sheep Track Member. As a result, the surface details of most of the upper lava flows in this lava field remain obscured and the cones are mantled with Sheep Track pumice. The Snowshoe Lava Field contains three subglacial cones, Tennena Cone being the only one named. Tennena Cone consists of a pile of tuff breccia and pillow basalt and is one of the oldest cones in the Snowshoe Lava Field. A smaller unnamed subglacial cone 1.5 km (0.93 mi) to the south also consists of a pile of pillow basalt and tuff breccia. Further south at the southern terminus of Tencho Glacier is another unnamed pile of tuff breccia and pillow basalt. It may be the remains of a tuff ring that has been glacially modified after having formed in a meltwater lake when Tencho Glacier existed at lower elevations.

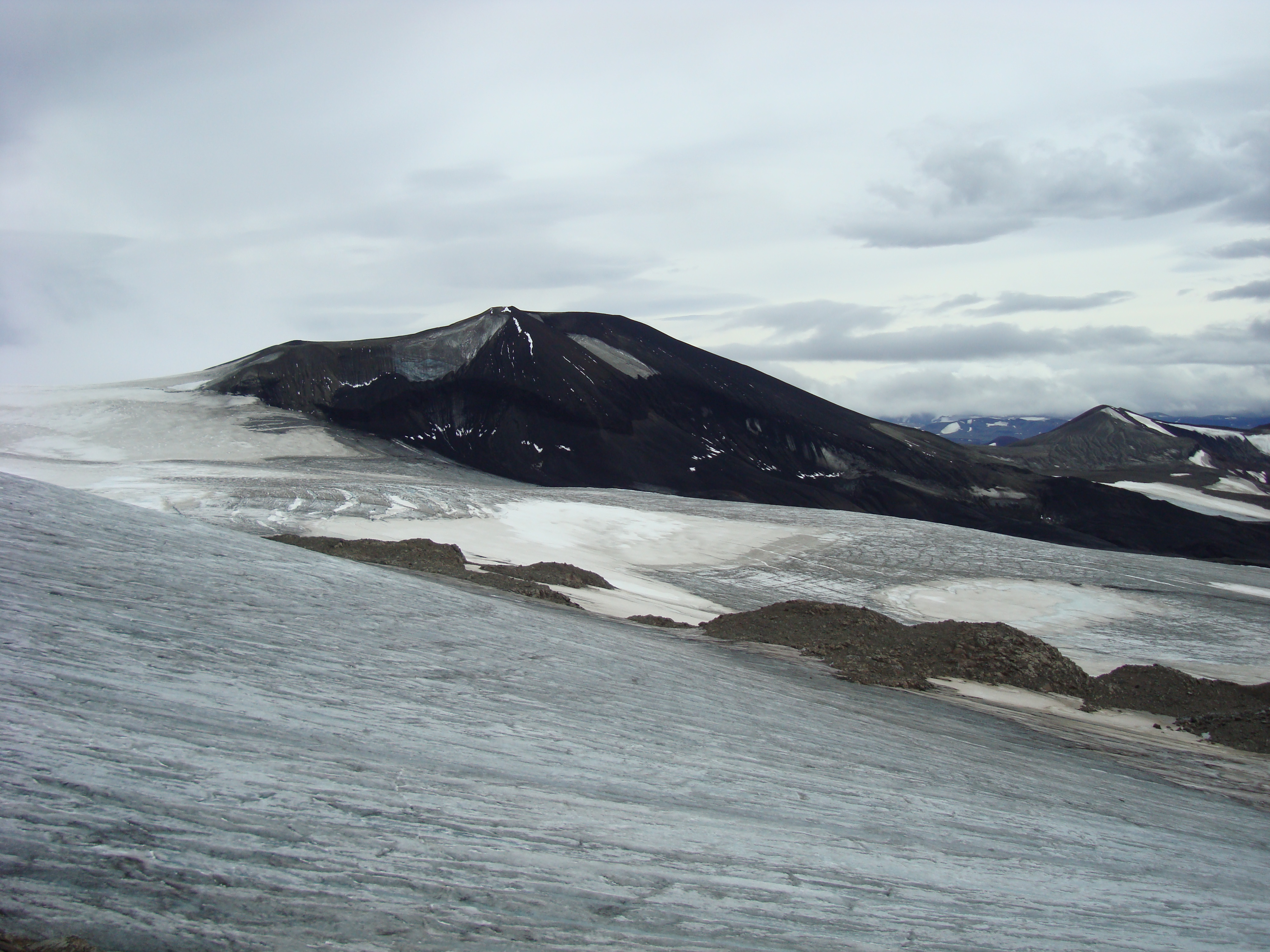
Tennena Cone from the north

The Snowshoe Lava Field contains five transitional cones, (Note: Transitional cones are volcanic cones that initially interacted with water during eruption and then later transitioned into normal subaerial volcanic piles as the progressing eruptions displaced ice and meltwater.) one of which is named. Two unnamed transitional cones are on the southwestern edge of Mount Edziza's summit ice cap inside the alpine trim lines, both of which have been reduced to low, drumlin-like ridges as a result of glacial ice overridding them. The three other transitional cones are unglaciated, having formed at lower elevations just below the terminal alpine moraine. Their inner structures have been exposed by sufficient erosion, but they still retain their central craters and original conical form. One of these cones, Coffee Crater, was the source of a lava flow that extended to the southwest; the northern edge of the terminal lobe of this lava flow forms a prominent, 18-metre-high (59-foot) escarpment.

Three subaerial cones exist in the Snowshoe Lava Field, two of which are named. The largest subaerial cone, Cocoa Crater, produced a 2 km (1.2 mi) wide lava flow that travelled into upper Sezill Creek canyon. Keda Cone (Note: Keda Cone is referred to by the numeronym SLF-9 and is erroneously called Kena Cone in the Catalogue of Canadian volcanoes. According to BC Geographical Names, Keda Cone is the proper name.) and an unnamed subaerial cone to the northeast issued the most voluminous lava in the Snowshoe Lava Field, having flowed westward where it engulfed an area more than 3 km (1.9 mi) wide and 8 km (5.0 mi) long. This lava then continued to flow westward into upper Taweh Valley where it transformed into a relatively narrow flow that formerly extended to near Mess Creek. A subaerial vent referred to as The Saucer produced the youngest lava flow in the Snowshoe Lava Field from near the southern edge of Mount Edziza's summit ice cap. Unlike the other three subaerial centres, The Saucer flow appears to have issued without any accompanying lava fountaining, resulting in no cinder cone development.

==== Sheep Track Member ====
The southwestern flank of Ice Peak and the surrounding Big Raven Plateau are blanketed with loose, air-fall tephra of the Sheep Track Member. It covers an area of about 40 square kilometres (15 square miles) and consists of pumice fragments that range in size from snowball-sized chunks to pea-sized debris. The largest fragments occur along the western margin of Tencho Glacier while the smallest fragments form a circular area at least 10 km (6.2 mi) in diameter. Erosion has largely removed the Sheep Track pumice from drainage channels of small intermittent streams on the upper Big Raven Plateau, but deposits as much as 2 m (6.6 ft) thick occur in interfluvial areas. Although the Sheep Track pumice was deposited on nearly all of the Snowshoe Lava Field flows and cinder cones, The Saucer is covered by only thin drifts of wind-blown pumice and may postdate the Sheep Track eruption. The source of the Sheep Track pumice remains unknown, but it probably originated from a vent hidden under Tencho Glacier. Fission track dating of Sheep Track pumice on the southwestern flank of Ice Peak has yielded an age of 950 CE ± 6000 years.

==== Walkout Creek valley ====
Location of the Big Raven Formation in British Columbia, Canada

Two small Big Raven cones called the Walkout Creek centres occur on the northern and western sides of Walkout Creek valley, both of which are largely buried and deeply eroded. The larger cone on the northern side of the valley is of geological interest because it was constructed on top of an active, slow moving landslide. Although both cones produced lava flows, lava from the larger cone was controlled by the underlying landslide which is characterized by hummocky, ridge and trough topography. As a result, some of this lava was forced to flow into depressions paralleling minor landslide scarps.

==== East slope centres ====
The heavily eroded eastern flank of Mount Edziza contains at least three satellitic centres of the Big Raven Formation. Cinder Cliff consists of thin, slaggy basalt flows that ponded against an ice dam in the upper part of Tenchen Valley. Tuff breccia and ash, as well as glacial and fluvial gravel, form mixed deposits at the base of Cinder Cliff. Icefall Cone on the northeastern spur of Tennaya Cirque and Ridge Cone on the western rim of Idiji Cirque are remnants of two Big Raven eruptive centres that have been greatly modified by mass wasting and alpine glaciation. They both consist of agglutinated spatter, bombs, cinders and slaggy basalt flows; the lava flows are almost completely buried under talus, moraine, fluvial gravel and glacial ice. An intermittently exposed basalt flow extending to near Kakiddi Lake may have issued from Icefall Cone, Ridge Cone or an undiscovered vent inside a narrow, wedge-shaped notch on the eastern flank of Mount Edziza.

==== Kana Cone ====
The northernmost Big Raven vent and the northernmost vent of the entire MEVC is marked by the nested Kana Cone which rises about 60 m (200 ft) above the surrounding terrain. Its summit contains a roughly 20 m (66 ft) deep crater that is breached to the north, exposing oxidated bombs and spatter. Lava from the crater breach extends downslope into Klastline Valley where it temporarily dammed the Klastline River; the river has since etched a new channel along the northern valley wall. The lava continued to flow downstream through Klastline Valley and possibly reached the Stikine River where Big Raven lava flows overlie about 100 m (330 ft) of sediment at the mouths of the Klastline and Tahltan rivers.

=== Arctic Lake Plateau ===
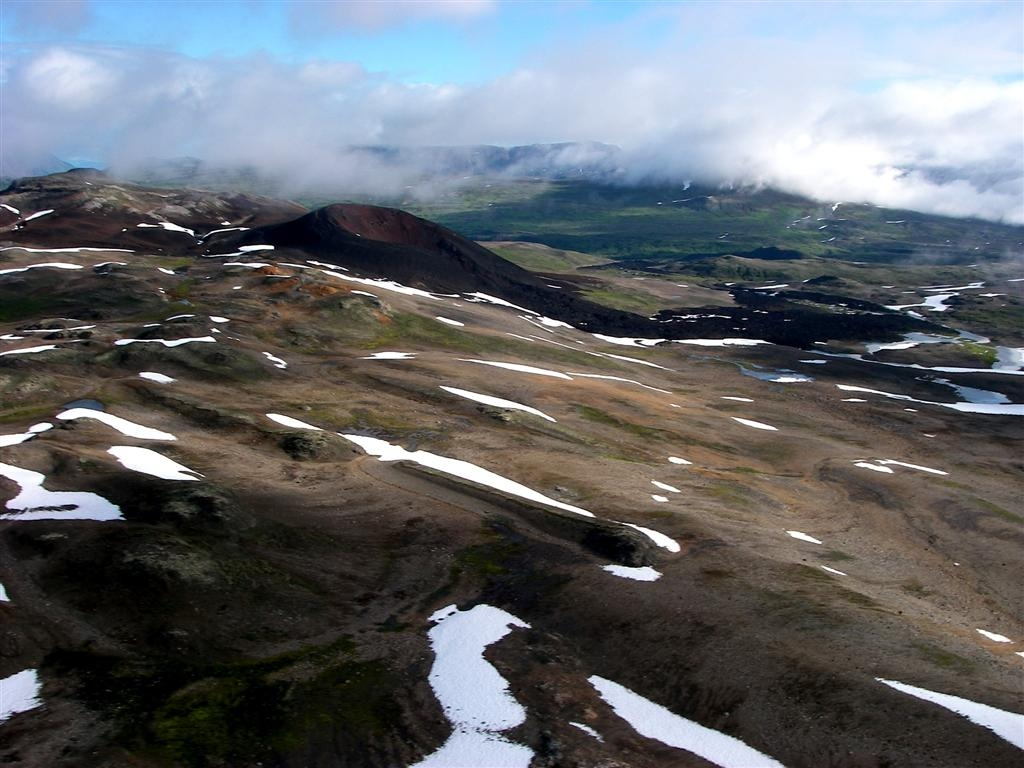
Nahta Cone and lava flow

Two isolated occurrences of the Big Raven Formation occur on the Arctic Lake Plateau, Nahta Cone near its northern edge being the southernmost vent of Big Raven age. This cone overlies a glacially-scoured limestone hill and contains a crater that is breached to the east. At least five small conelets comprise Nahta Cone, the largest of which has a topographic relief of approximately 60 m (200 ft). The breach in the eastern crater rim served as a passageway for at least two highly fluid lava flows that travelled north along a drainage system. Extending 700 m (2,300 ft) north and 500 m (1,600 ft) west of Nahta Cone are two tephra deposits, suggesting it was active twice during different wind directions.

Northeast of Nahta Cone on the south flank of Kuno Peak in the Spectrum Range are the remains of a Big Raven pyroclastic cone. The remains consist of steeply dipping beds of coarse agglutinated pyroclastic rocks and basaltic lava flows that overlie thick felsenmeer and talus deposits. Much of this cone has been destroyed by repeated landslides and solifluction on Kuno Peak, the former of which also buried lava flows on the Arctic Lake Plateau that originated from this cone.

=== Kitsu Plateau ===
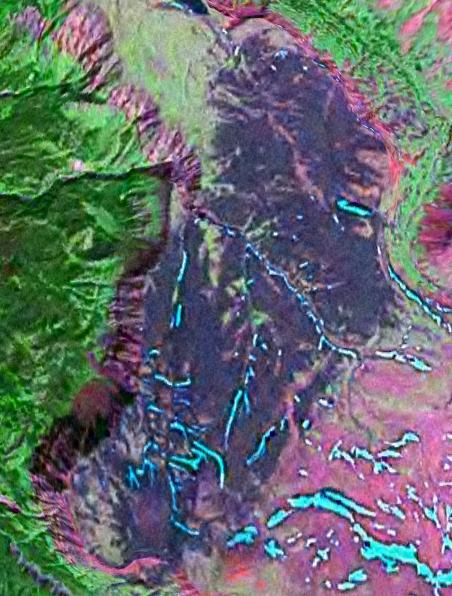
False colour image of air-fall tephra from The Ash Pit

The Mess Lake Lava Field is an area of lava flows and tephra deposits between Raspberry Creek in the north, Nagha Creek in the south and Mess Lake in the east. It covers an area of about 18 square kilometres (6.9 square miles) and contains three separate vents of Big Raven age. The two oldest vents are marked by slightly eroded pyroclastic cones whose craters and cone-shaped structures are still apparent despite being somewhat rounded. Lava flows from both cones travelled westward to the edge of the Mess Creek Escarpment where they most likely cascaded into Mess Creek valley, but no evidence of this phenomenon has been found on or below the escarpment.

At the southern end of the Mess Lake Lava Field on the steep, south-facing side of Nagha Creek is the third separate vent called The Ash Pit. This 60 m (200 ft) deep and 0.4 km (0.25 mi) in diameter conical depression is the youngest vent of the Mess Lake Lava Field; it may also be the youngest vent of the entire MEVC. The Ash Pit was the source of a 2.5 km (1.6 mi) wide and 6.5 km (4.0 mi) long tephra deposit on the Kitsu Plateau that extends to the northeast. It was also the source of a lava flow that travelled down Nagha Creek valley towards the eastern side of Mess Lake, portions of which are buried under stream gravel, outwash and braided channel deposits.

== See also ==
- Geology of British Columbia
