= Snowshoe Lava Field =

Lava field in British Columbia, Canada

- Lava field
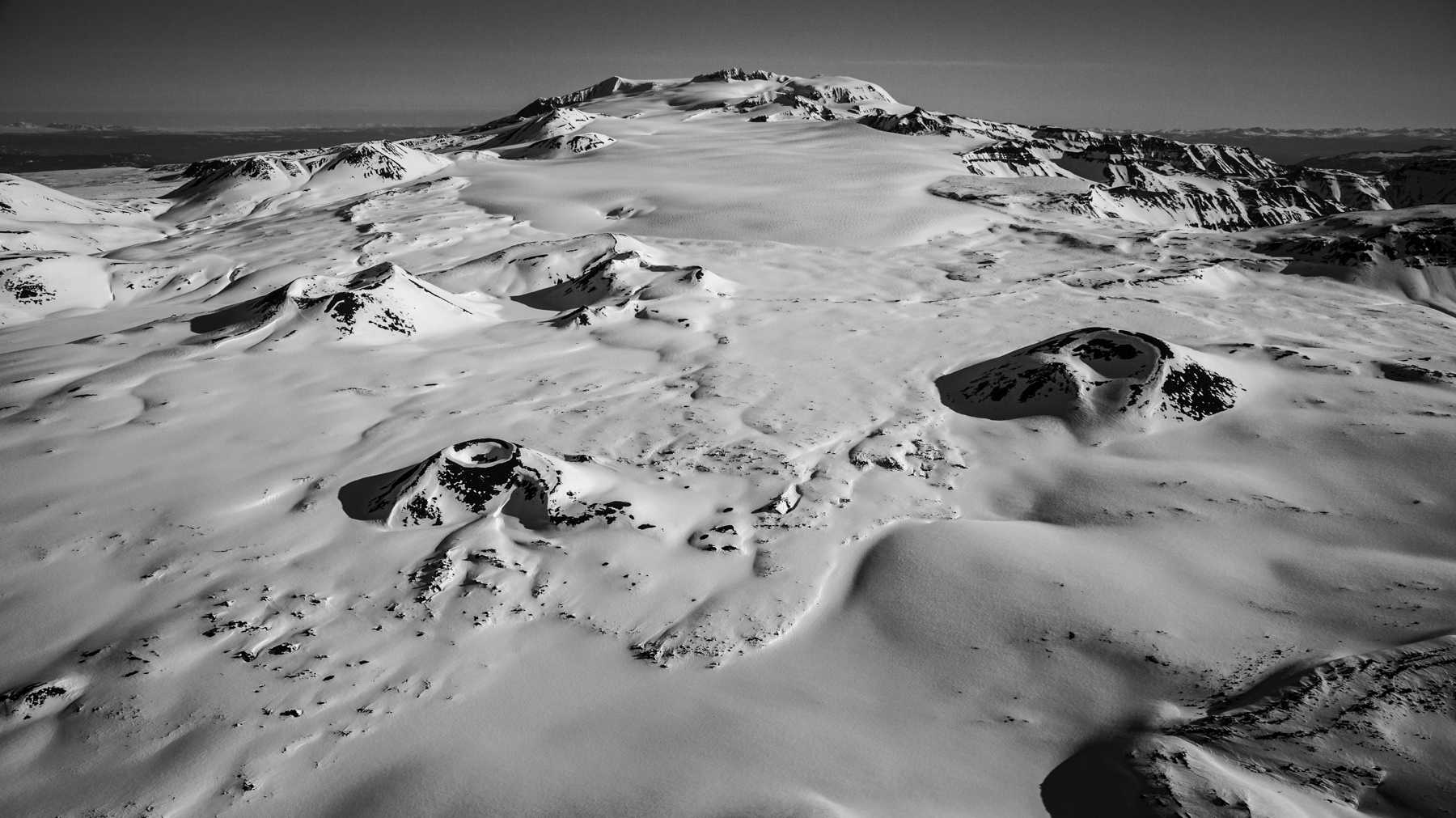
- The southern end of the Big Raven Plateau with the Snowshoe Lava Field in the foreground

- Location in British Columbia
- Interactive map of Snowshoe Lava Field
- Coordinates: 57.63°N 130.67°W
- Location: British Columbia, Canada
- Part of: Mount Edziza complex
- Age: Holocene
- Formed by: Volcanism
- Geology: Alkali basalt, hawaiite

Area
  - Total: More than 40 km^{2} (15 mi^{2})
- Elevation: 2,390 m (7,840 ft)
- Designation: Mount Edziza Park

The Snowshoe Lava Field (SLF) is a largely buried volcanic field at Mount Edziza in British Columbia, Canada. It reaches an elevation of 2,390 metres (7,840 feet) and covers more than 40 square kilometres (15 square miles) of the Big Raven Plateau and adjacent valleys with blocky lava flows. The SLF is the southern of two lava fields on the Big Raven Plateau, the other being the larger Desolation Lava Field at the northern end of the plateau. It is in Mount Edziza Provincial Park and is part of the Mount Edziza volcanic complex; the latter consists of several other volcanic landforms such as shield volcanoes, stratovolcanoes, lava domes and cinder cones. Sezill Creek, Shaman Creek, Taweh Creek and several other unnamed streams in the Stikine River watershed drain the SLF. Access to the lava field is by aircraft or by a network of horse trails from surrounding roads.

The SLF issued from several eruptive centres during the Holocene, most of which are clustered on the southern and western flanks of Ice Peak at elevations more than 1,800 m (5,900 ft). Volcanism in the lava field began with the eruption of three subglacial volcanoes when outlet glaciers of Mount Edziza's ice cap extended to lower elevations during the climax of a glacial advance. This was followed by the creation of four other volcanoes whose eruptions were at first subaqueous and then transitioned subaerially. The youngest volcanoes in the SLF are completely subaerial in origin and issued most of the blocky lava flows forming much of the current surface of the lava field. Alkali basalt and hawaiite of the Big Raven Formation are the main volcanic rocks composing the SLF. However, most of them are obscured by trachyte pumice of the Sheep Track Member.

== Geography ==
The Snowshoe Lava Field is located at the southern end of the Big Raven Plateau which is bounded by Mess Creek valley in the west, Kakiddi Creek valley in the east and the Klastline River valley in the north. This intermontane plateau is one of the principal physiographic features of the Mount Edziza volcanic complex, a group of overlapping shield volcanoes, stratovolcanoes, lava domes and cinder cones that have formed over the last 7.5 million years. The SLF reaches an elevation of 2,390 m (7,840 ft) on the plateau, but remnants of the lava field decrease in elevation to 914 m (2,999 ft) near Mess Creek. It is one of two lava fields on the Big Raven Plateau, the other being the larger Desolation Lava Field at the northern end of the plateau. Mount Edziza Provincial Park surrounds the SLF; it was established in 1972 to preserve the volcanic landscape.

=== Landforms ===
The SLF consists of more than 40 km^{2} (15 mi^{2}) of blocky lava flows that issued from 12 eruptive centres. Most of these eruptive centres are more than 1,800 m (5,900 ft) in elevation and are located on the southern and western flanks of Ice Peak, the prominent south peak of Mount Edziza. Cocoa Crater, Keda Cone, Coffee Crater, Tennena Cone and The Saucer are the only named eruptive centres in the SLF. Tennena Cone on the upper western side of Ice Peak is the highest with an elevation of 2,390 m (7,840 ft). However, the Global Volcanism Program gives a lower elevation of 2,350 m (7,710 ft) for the cone.

Cocoa Crater and Coffee Crater on the western and southern flanks of Ice Peak attain elevations of 2,117 and 2,000 m (6,946 and 6,562 ft), respectively. Keda Cone, 1,980 m (6,500 ft) in elevation, is just south of Coffee Crater on the southern side of upper Taweh Creek. The Saucer is a low, circular mound of lava 1,920 m (6,300 ft) in elevation on the southern flank of Ice Peak bounded by concentric ridges of broken lava slabs.

=== Drainage ===
As a part of the Mount Edziza volcanic complex, the SLF is drained entirely by streams within the Stikine River watershed. Taweh Creek flows northwest along the southern edge of the lava field and is a tributary of Mess Creek. At the northwestern end of the SLF is Sezill Creek, a northwesterly flowing tributary of Taweh Creek. Shaman Creek at the southeastern end of the lava field flows east and north into Kakiddi Lake which is an expansion of Kakiddi Creek. Tencho Glacier, which lies at the northeastern end of the SLF, is the source of Sezill Creek, Shaman Creek and several unnamed tributaries of Sezill Creek and Taweh Creek.

== Geology ==
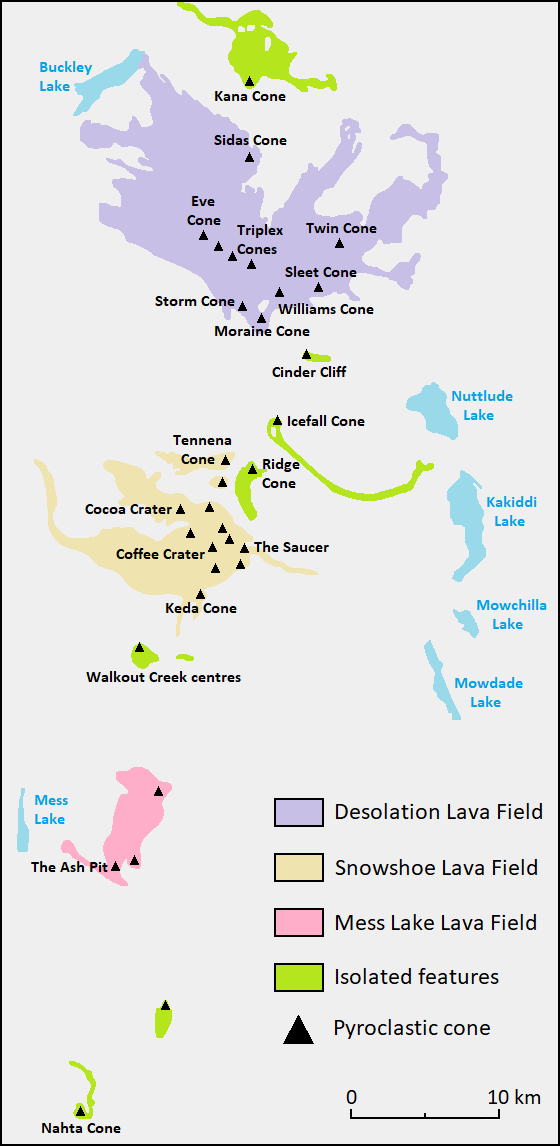
Geological map of the Big Raven Formation showing the extent of the Snowshoe Lava Field

The SLF is the second largest Holocene volcanic feature on the Big Raven Plateau, succeeded only by the Desolation Lava Field. It is also the second largest of three Holocene lava fields in the Mount Edziza volcanic complex; the smaller Mess Lake Lava Field covers about 18 km^{2} (6.9 mi^{2}). The SLF lava flows and volcanic cones consist mainly of alkali basalt and hawaiite of the Big Raven Formation; this is the youngest geological formation of the Mount Edziza volcanic complex. Nearly all of the surficial details of the SLF are obscured by pyroclastic fall of the Sheep Track Member, the only named geological member of the Big Raven Formation. The pyroclastic fall consists of granular trachyte pumice that was deposited by a small, but violent VEI-3 eruption from the southwestern flank of Ice Peak around 950 CE.

Individual eruptive centres of the SLF have been given names ranging from SLF-1 to SLF-12; greater numbers indicate a younger age. SLF-1, SLF-2 and SLF-3 are alkali basaltic and formed subglacially when outlet glaciers of Mount Edziza's ice cap extended to lower elevations during the climax of a glacial advance. SLF-4, SLF-5, SLF-6, SLF-7 and SLF-8 are volcanic cones formed when eruptions were at first subaqueous and then transitioned subaerially. They consist of alkali basalt and minor hawaiite which are in the form of subaqueous and subaerial ejecta. SLF-9, SLF-10, SLF-11 and SLF-12 are completely subaerial in origin and consist mainly of hawaiite. They are in the form of pyroclastic cones with the exception of the youngest eruptive centre, SLF-12.

The order of eruptions that formed the SLF are based on the degree of erosion and vegetation cover of the lava flows and volcanic cones, as well as the order in which the lava flows overlap. Most of the lava ponded onto the surrounding Big Raven Plateau in the form of broad, thick sheets, but some of it also travelled into neighbouring valleys; the largest of these valley-filling lava flows is located at the head of Taweh Creek. The transition from subglacial to subaerial volcanism in the SLF is attributed to the retreat of glaciers from lower elevations. These glaciers are now 0.5 km (0.31 mi) away from their trim lines, but during their maximum advance, they had an ice surface that rose 90–150 m (300–490 ft) above their current levels.

As a part of the Mount Edziza volcanic complex, the SLF lies within a broad area of volcanoes called the Northern Cordilleran Volcanic Province, which extends from northwestern British Columbia northwards through Yukon into easternmost Alaska. The dominant rocks that make up these volcanoes are alkali basalts and hawaiites, but nephelinites, basanites and peralkaline phonolites, trachytes and comendites are locally abundant. These rocks were deposited by volcanic eruptions from 20 million years ago to as recently as a few hundred years ago. Volcanism in the Northern Cordilleran Volcanic Province is thought to be due to rifting of the North American Cordillera, driven by changes in relative plate motion between the North American and Pacific plates.

=== Subglacial centres ===
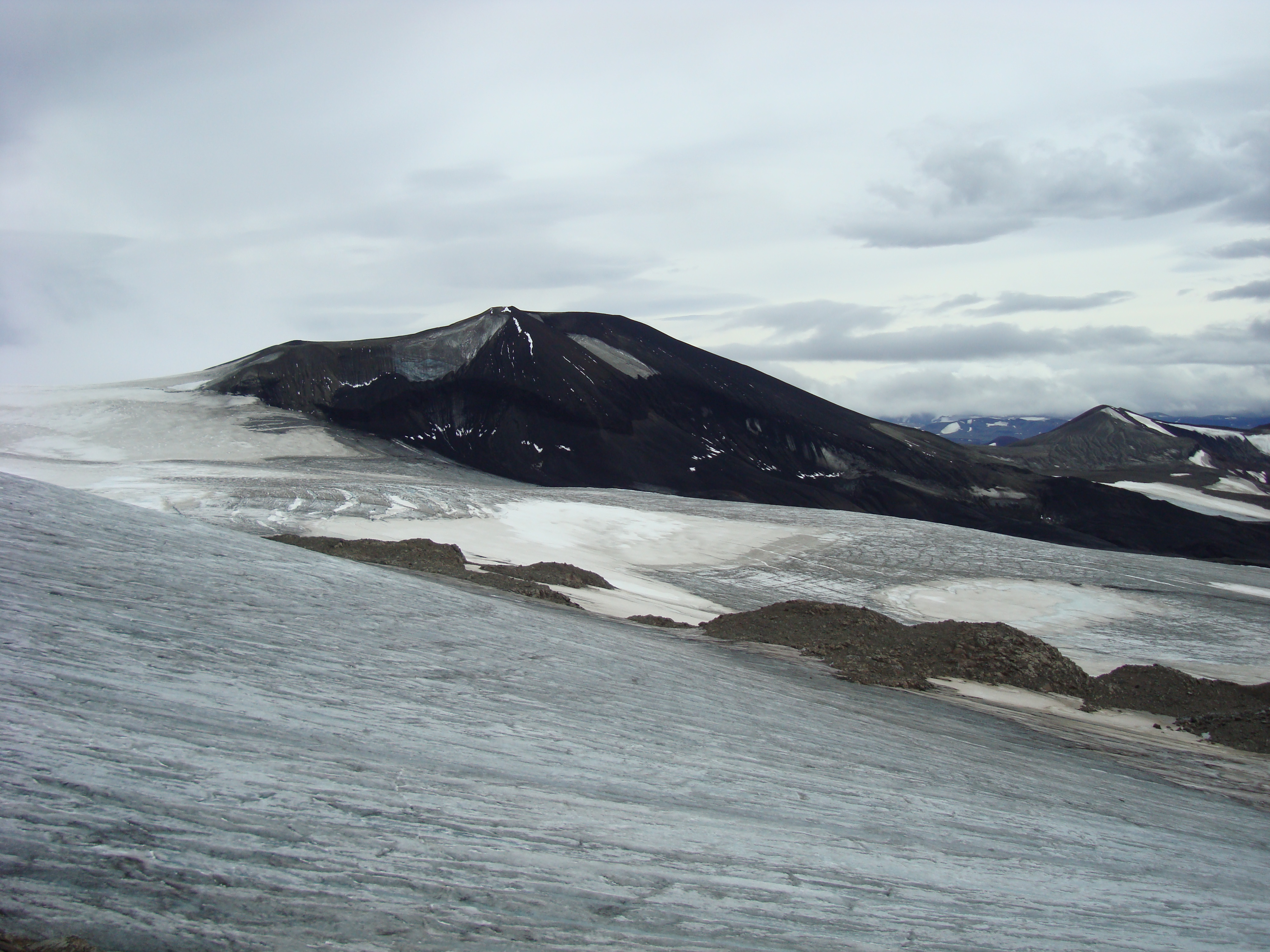
Tennena Cone is the oldest eruptive centre in the Snowshoe Lava Field

SLF-1 is Tennena Cone which is one of the few glaciovolcanic features at Mount Edziza that have been investigated in detail. It has been mapped into four subdivisions, all of which are exposed on the eastern, southern and western flanks of the cone. The first subdivision is massive and crudely bedded tuff breccia exposed in near-vertical cliffs on the flanks of Tennena Cone. Exposed in scarps on the eastern and southern flanks of Tennena Cone is lapilli tuff of the second subdivision which forms 10-to-30-centimetre-thick (3.9-to-11.8-inch) beds. Two 1 m (3.3 ft) wide dikes compose the third subdivision, both of which consist of fragmented plagioclase-phyric rock. The first dike forms a 5 m (16 ft) high remnant and is exposed on the eastern flank of Tennena Cone whereas the second dike is exposed 50 m (160 ft) to the south. In addition to occurring on the eastern flank, the second dike is also exposed on the western flank and along the summit ridge of Tennena Cone. The fourth subdivision consists of pillow and fluidal lavas that overlie tuff breccia in the northern section of the cone.

About 1.5 km (0.93 mi) south of Tennena Cone is SLF-2, a smaller crescent-shaped nunatak protruding through the western portion of Tencho Glacier. It may be the remains of a parasitic cone closely related to Tennena Cone or it may be an extension of Tennena Cone since it consists of similar geology. SLF-3 at the southern terminus of Tencho Glacier is a crescent-shaped ridge that has been overridden by glacial ice. Crudely bedded tuff breccia and quenched flow fragments form the entire ridge, which may be the remains of a tuff ring that formed in a meltwater lake. In contrast to Tennena Cone which was constructed on a steep slope, SLF-3 is underlain by flat-lying terrain of the Big Raven Plateau. This likely resulted in their differing geomorphology; the Tennena Cone eruption sent both lava and meltwater down the steep western flank of Ice Peak whereas ejecta from the SLF-3 eruption ponded inside a meltwater lake when Tencho Glacier extended onto the flat plateau surface.

=== Transitional centres ===
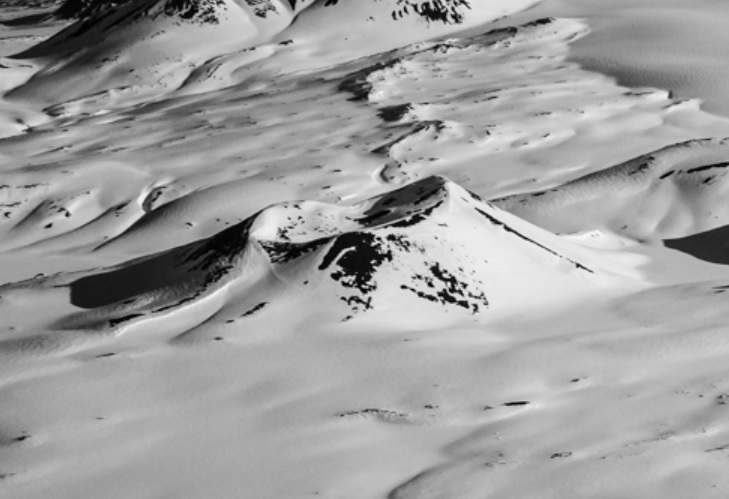
Coffee Crater from the south

SLF-4 and SLF-5 are located on the western and southern margins of Tencho Glacier, respectively. They are within the trim lines of this glacier and have been reduced to low, drumlin-like ridges from glacial ice overriding them. A short distance beyond the trim lines of Tencho Glacier are SLF-6, SLF-7 and SLF-8; SLF-7 is Coffee Crater. These eruptive centres contrast from SLF-4 and SLF-5 in that they have not been overridden by glacial ice, which has allowed them to retain their central craters and their original conical forms. However, their inner structures have been partially exposed due to sufficient erosion. All five eruptive centres consist of a lower succession of brown subaqueous tuff breccia and an upper sequence of subaerial cinders, spatter and bombs. These rocks have been stained red due to extreme oxidation.

Lava flows from the transitional centres have been mostly buried under younger basalt of the subaerial centres, as well as pumice of the Sheep Track Member. However, they are exposed where streams have eroded the overlying volcanic deposits. The lava flows are also locally exposed along streams that have cut through older lava flows below.

=== Subaerial centres ===
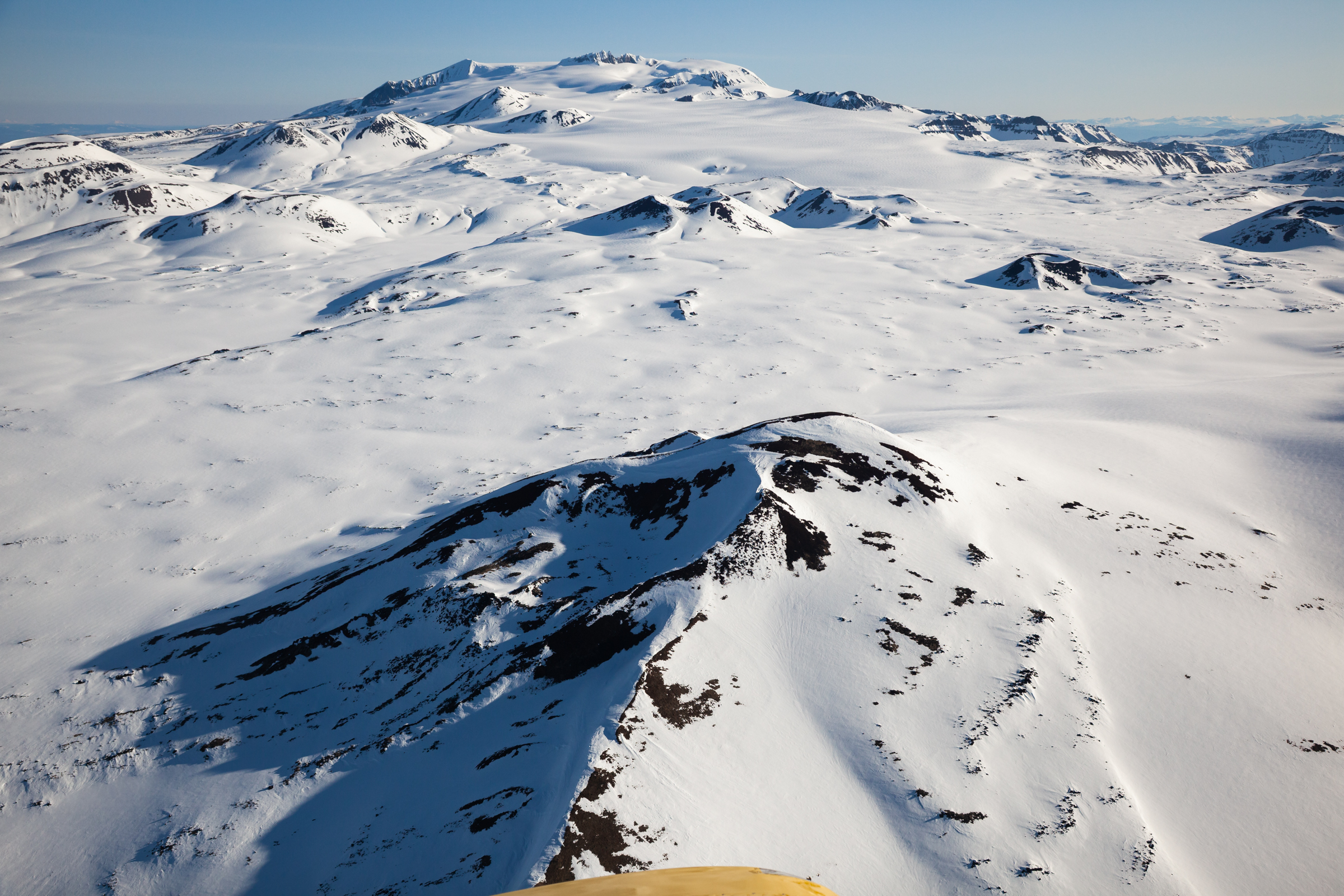
Keda Cone in the foreground with flat-topped Mount Edziza in the background. Coffee Crater, SLF-11 and SLF-8 are visible north and northeast of Keda Cone.

Most of the blocky lava flows forming much of the current surface of the SLF originated from eruptive centres SLF-9, SLF-10 and SLF-11, all of which are pyroclastic cones. These cones consist of agglutinated lapilli, bombs and spatter which have been stained red due to extreme oxidation. SLF-9 is Keda Cone at the southern end of the lava field whereas SLF-10 is Cocoa Crater near the centre of the lava field. Cocoa Crater issued a 2 km (1.2 mi) wide lava flow that cascaded into upper Sezill Creek canyon, but the most voluminous lava flows originated from Keda Cone and SLF-11. SLF-11 is the only subaerial eruptive centre in the SLF without a name.

Lava flows from Keda Cone and SLF-11 engulfed an area more than 3 km (1.9 mi) wide and 8 km (5.0 mi) long on the Big Raven Plateau prior to entering the upper valley of Taweh Creek. At the head of Taweh Valley, the Keda Cone and SLF-11 flows converged to form a relatively narrow tongue of lava that travelled for at least another 12 km (7.5 mi) to near Mess Creek. Erosion has removed nearly all of the final 3 km (1.9 mi) of this lava tongue; small remnants are present along the banks of lower Taweh Creek near the junction with Mess Creek. None of the lava flows from these three subaerial eruptive centres show any evidence of having been quenched by water at the time of their eruption, nor do any of the pyroclastic cones.

The youngest subaerial eruptive centre, SLF-12, is The Saucer which appears to be the remains of a fissure instead of a pyroclastic cone. This vent south of Tencho Glacier issued lava that travelled eastward and westward; the 5 km (3.1 mi) long eastward lava flow entered the head of Shaman Creek whereas the relatively thick westward lava flow spread onto the Big Raven Plateau in the form of broad lobes. In contrast to the neighbouring Coffee Crater lava flows which are overlain by thick drifts and pockets of Sheep Track pumice, The Saucer and its lava flows are only sparsely covered with very fine pumice of the Sheep Track Member. The sparsity of this very fine pumice on The Saucer and its lava flows suggests that they were extruded sometime after the explosive Sheep Track eruption which may have occurred around 950 CE. Because very fine pumice is susceptible of being blown by wind, it could easily be wind-blown material carried in from neighbouring pumice beds long after the Sheep Track eruption had occurred.

== Accessibility ==
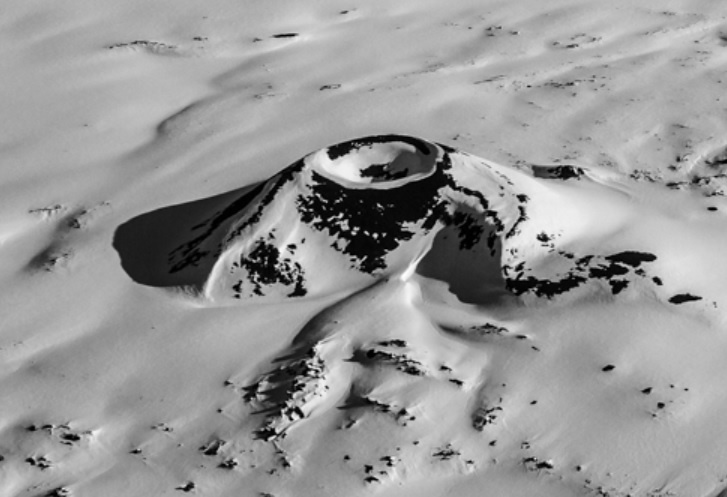
SLF-11 from the south

As a part of the Mount Edziza volcanic complex, the SLF is in a remote location with no established road access. The closest roads are the Stewart–Cassiar Highway to the east and the Telegraph Creek Road to the northwest; both come within 45 km (28 mi) of the lava field. Extending from these roads are horse trails that provide access to the Mount Edziza volcanic complex. From Telegraph Creek, the Buckley Lake Trail extends about 15 km (9.3 mi) southeast along Mess Creek and Three Mile Lake. It then traverses about 15 km (9.3 mi) northeast along Dagaichess Creek and Stinking Lake to the northeastern end of Buckley Lake. Here, it meets with the Klastline River Trail and the Buckley Lake to Mowdade Lake Route.

To the east, the roughly 50 km (31 mi) long Klastline River Trail begins at the community of Iskut on the Stewart–Cassiar Highway; it extends northwest and west along the Klastline River for much of its length. The trail enters Mount Edziza Provincial Park at about 25 km (16 mi) where Kakiddi Creek drains into the Klastline River. After entering Mount Edziza Provincial Park, it traverses northwest along the Klastline River for about 10 km (6.2 mi) and then crosses the river north of the Big Raven Plateau. From there, it traverses west for about 5 km (3.1 mi) to the northeastern end of Buckley Lake where it meets with the Buckley Lake Trail and Buckley Lake to Mowdade Lake Route.

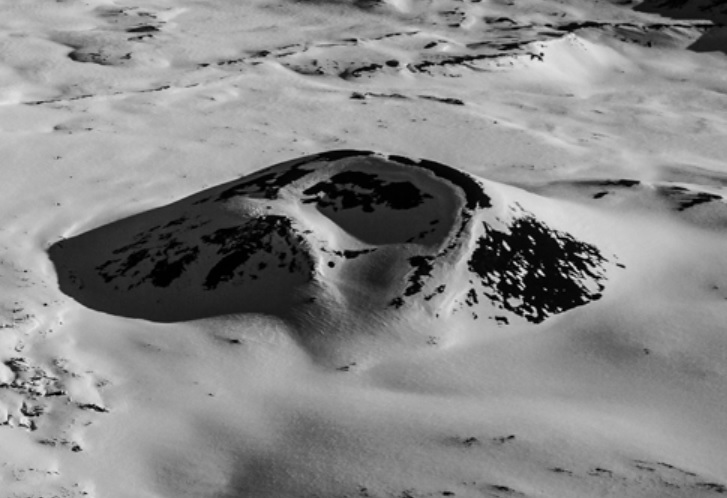
SLF-8 from the south

The Buckley Lake to Mowdade Lake Route traverses south from Buckley Lake along Buckley Creek and gradually climbs onto the northern end of the Big Raven Plateau where Tsekone Ridge and landforms of the Desolation Lava Field such as Eve Cone and Sidas Cone are visible along the route. Most of the Buckley Lake to Mowdade Lake Route is marked by a series of rock cairns from Tsekone Ridge onwards. At the southern end of the Buckley Lake to Mowdade Lake Route is the SLF where Tennena Cone, Coffee Crater and Keda Cone occur. The route continues east through Shaman Creek valley and then turns southeast to the northern end of Mowdade Lake.

The distance between Buckley Lake and Mowdade Lake is about 70 km (43 mi), but the hiking length between these two lakes varies depending on the route taken; it can take a minimum of 7 days to hike the Buckley Lake to Mowdade Lake Route. The weather can change extremely fast along this hiking trail. Buckley Lake is large enough to be used by float-equipped aircraft, but landing on this lake with a private aircraft requires a letter of authorization from the BC Parks Stikine Senior Park Ranger. Mowdade Lake, about 15 km (9.3 mi) southeast of the Snowshow Lava Field, is also of significant size and does not require a letter of authorization from the BC Parks Stikine Senior Park Ranger to land on it with a private aircraft. Alpine Lakes Air and BC Yukon Air are the only air charter companies permitted to provide access to this area via aircraft.

== See also ==
- Volcanism of the Mount Edziza volcanic complex
- List of volcanic fields
