= Eve Cone =

Cinder cone in British Columbia, Canada

- Eve's Cone
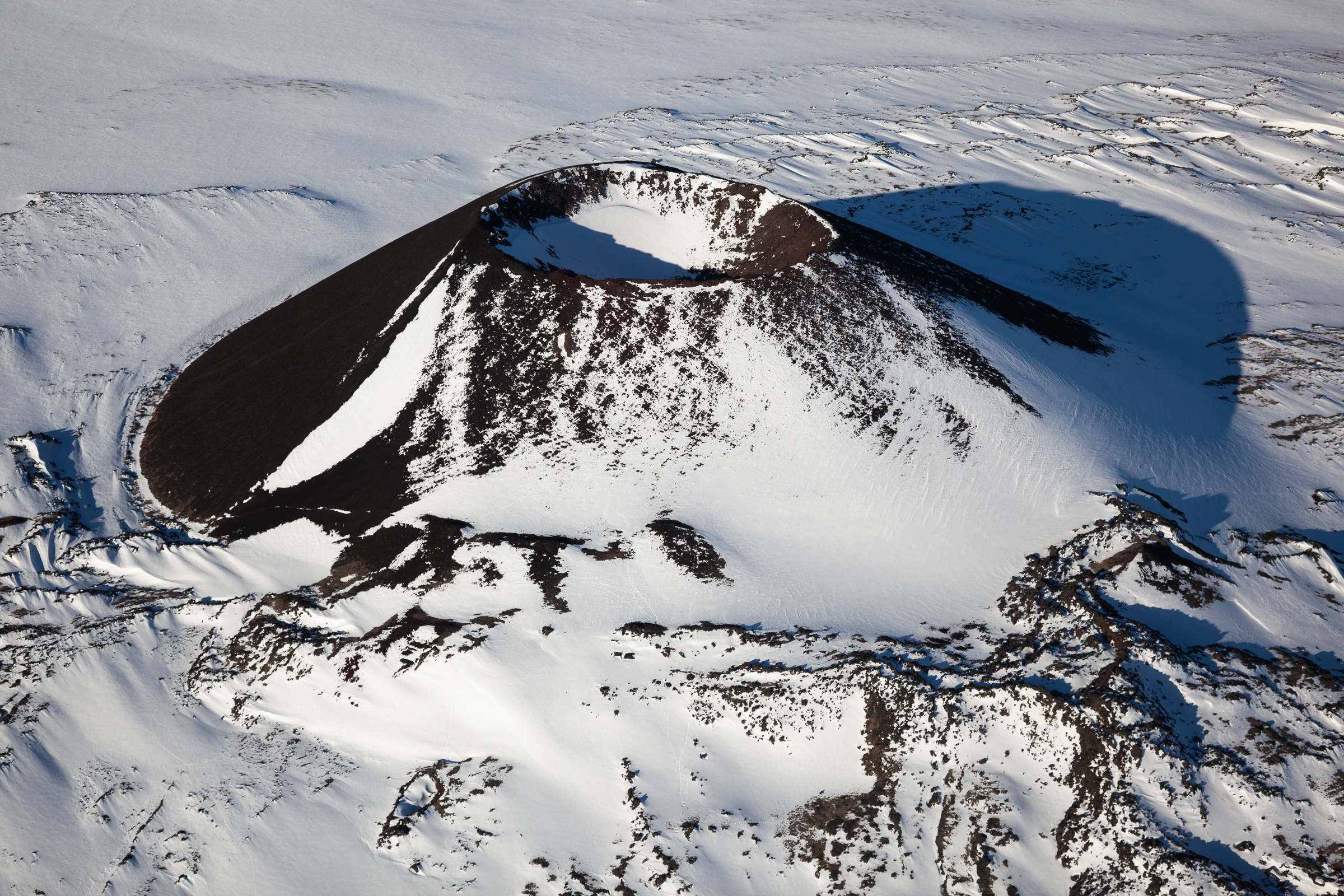
- Eve Cone from the northeast

Highest point
- Elevation: 1,740 m (5,710 ft)
- Coordinates: 57°48′47″N 130°40′32″W

Naming
- Etymology: Eve Brown Edzerza
- Defining authority: BC Geographical Names office in Victoria, British Columbia

Geography
- Location in British Columbia
- Location in Mount Edziza Provincial Park
- Country: Canada
- Province: British Columbia
- District: Cassiar Land District
- Protected area: Mount Edziza Provincial Park
- Parent range: Tahltan Highland
- Topo map: NTS 104G15 Buckley Lake

Geology
- Formed by: Volcanism
- Mountain type: Cinder cone
- Rock type: Hawaiite
- Volcanic field: Desolation Lava Field
- Last eruption: Holocene age

Climbing
- Normal route: Trail on the southeastern flank

Eve Cone, also referred to as Eve's Cone, is a cinder cone in Cassiar Land District of northwestern British Columbia, Canada. It has an elevation of 1,740 metres (5,710 feet) and is one of several volcanic cones in the Desolation Lava Field. Situated southeast of the community of Telegraph Creek, it lies in Mount Edziza Provincial Park, one of the largest provincial parks in British Columbia. A roughly 12-kilometre-long (7.5-mile) lava field issued from Eve Cone during the Holocene (Note: Many geologically recent eruptions in Canada have not been radiometrically dated. Instead, a Holocene age is inferred because the volcanic deposits do not show signs of having been overridden by the Cordilleran Ice Sheet, which completely retreated about 11,000 years ago.) and travelled down the northern side of the Big Raven Plateau. It branches out into many narrower lava channels, the largest of which extends to Buckley Lake.

Eve Cone is part of the Mount Edziza volcanic complex, which consists of a wide variety of landforms such as shield volcanoes, stratovolcanoes, lava domes and cinder cones. The cone contains a circular summit crater 45 m (148 ft) deep, but most of the lava from the volcano appears to have issued from vents around the base of the 350 m (1,150 ft) wide cone. Eve Cone is surrounded by a number of other volcanic features, including Tsekone Ridge, Pillow Ridge, Sidas Cone and the Triplex Cones. The cone can be reached via horse trails from Telegraph Creek and Iskut; float-equipped aircraft can fly to nearby Buckley Lake to reach it as well.

== Name and etymology ==
Jack Souther, a geologist of the Geological Survey of Canada who studied the area in detail from 1965 to 1992, named the cone after Eve Brown Edzerza. Edzerza was a local indigenous woman who traversed Mount Edziza via dog sled with her husband, Johnny Edzerza, and a man named Hank Williams in or before 1974. Johnny and Williams were killed in an avalanche from the mountain during a vicious snowstorm that had blown in from the north, but Eve survived, directing a rescue team to the site of the accident.

Williams and the Edzerzas were Tahltans, the local First Nations people whose traditional territory covers an area of more than 93,500 km^{2} (36,100 mi^{2}). Eve Edzerza's survival of the event and courage following the avalanche is now a legend among the Tahltans. Johnny Edzerza was buried on Mount Edziza; both Edzerza and Edziza may be etymologically linked. Williams Cone on the northeastern side of the mountain was named in honour of Williams.

Eve Cone was officially named on January 2, 1980. Its name was adopted on the National Topographic System map 104G/15 after being submitted to the BC Geographical Names office by the Geological Survey of Canada. In his 1992 report The Late Cenozoic Mount Edziza Volcanic Complex, British Columbia, Jack Souther called Eve Cone DLF-9; DLF is an acronym for the Desolation Lava Field whereas 9 refers to Eve Cone being the ninth youngest eruptive centre in the Desolation Lava Field. BC Parks refers to the cone as both Eve Cone and Eve's Cone.

== Geography ==
Eve Cone is located in Cassiar Land District of northwestern British Columbia, Canada, about 11 km (6.8 mi) southeast of Buckley Lake at the northern end of the Big Raven Plateau. It has an elevation of 1,740 m (5,710 ft) and is one of several volcanic cones in the Desolation Lava Field, which is one of the largest areas of Holocene lava flows of the Mount Edziza volcanic complex. The volcanic complex consists of a group of overlapping shield volcanoes, stratovolcanoes, lava domes and cinder cones that have formed over the last 7.5 million years. Eve Cone is one of the most symmetrical and best-preserved cinder cones in Canada, rising 172 m (564 ft) above the surrounding terrain to a circular summit crater 45 m (148 ft) deep. Lichen and pioneer vegetation sparsely grows on the base of the 350 m (1,150 ft) wide cone.

The Smithsonian Institution's Global Volcanism Program lists Eve Cone as one of many satellitic cones of Mount Edziza due to its location on the northern flank of this stratovolcano. Apart from the main edifice of Mount Edziza, which reaches an elevation of 2,786 m (9,140 ft), Eve Cone is surrounded by a number of other volcanic features. About 5 km (3.1 mi) southwest of Eve Cone is Tsekone Ridge on the northwestern flank of Mount Edziza. Pillow Ridge, about 5 km (3.1 mi) south of Eve Cone, extends northwest from the northern flank of Mount Edziza. About 2 km (1.2 mi) southeast of Eve Cone are the Triplex Cones, a southeast-trending line of three deeply eroded volcanic cones. Sidas Cone about 5 km (3.1 mi) northeast of Eve Cone is a composite of two overlapping cones. The Pillow and Tsekone ridges are older volcanic features of Pleistocene age whereas Sidas Cone and the Triplex Cones are part of the younger Desolation Lava Field.

Eve Cone lies in Mount Edziza Provincial Park southeast of the community of Telegraph Creek. With an area of 2,661.8 km^{2} (1,027.7 mi^{2}), Mount Edziza Provincial Park is one of the largest provincial parks in British Columbia and was established in 1972 to preserve the volcanic landscape. It includes not only the Mount Edziza area but also the Spectrum Range to the south, which are separated by Raspberry Pass. Mount Edziza Provincial Park is in the Tahltan Highland, a southeast-trending upland area extending along the western side of the Stikine Plateau.

== Geology ==
=== Background ===
As a part of the Mount Edziza volcanic complex, Eve Cone lies within a broad area of volcanoes called the Northern Cordilleran Volcanic Province, which extends from northwestern British Columbia northwards through Yukon into easternmost Alaska. The dominant rocks that make up these volcanoes are alkali basalts and hawaiites, but nephelinites, basanites and peralkaline (Note: Peralkaline rocks are magmatic rocks that have a higher ratio of sodium and potassium to aluminum.) phonolites, trachytes and comendites are locally abundant. These rocks were deposited by volcanic eruptions from 20 million years ago to as recently as a few hundred years ago. Volcanism in the Northern Cordilleran Volcanic Province is thought to be due to rifting of the North American Cordillera, driven by changes in relative plate motion between the North American and Pacific plates.

=== Structure ===
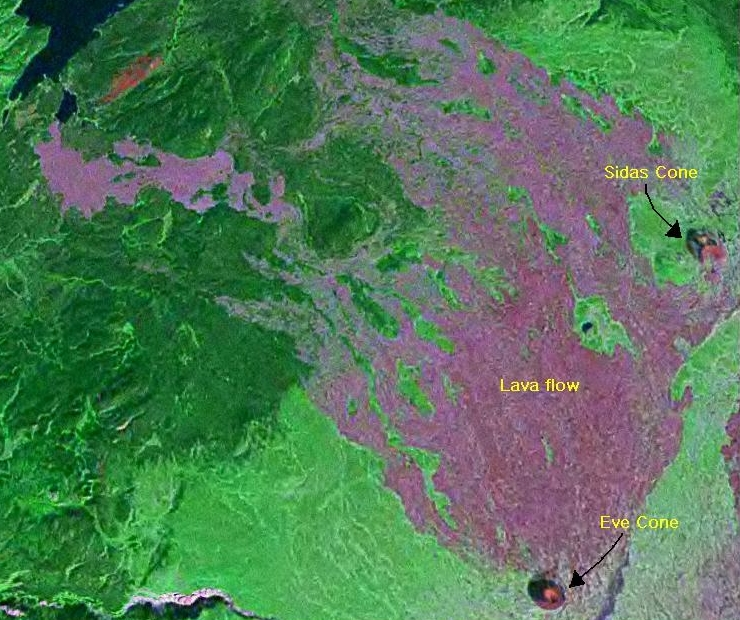
False colour image of lava flows from Eve and Sidas cones

Eve Cone is a monogenetic cinder cone, a simple volcanic edifice that erupted over a single eruptive phase. Such features are typically considered to erupt only once and to be short-lived; they can remain active from days to years but are fed by a relatively small amount of magma. Eve Cone consists of hawaiite of the Big Raven Formation and is one of the two youngest eruptive centres in the Desolation Lava Field; the other is Williams Cone about 6 km (3.7 mi) to the southeast. Both cones are of Holocene age but Eve Cone was most likely formed by a towering, vertical lava fountain due to its symmetrical structure. Loosely aggregated volcanic ejecta such as bombs, cinders and ash cover the outer surface of Eve Cone.

Relatively fine, dark grey bombs and cinders cover the northern half of Eve Cone whereas coarser, clinkery spatter is exposed in the more deeply eroded southern half of the cone. Erosion on the southern flank is more extreme due to accelerated frost wedging and solifluction (Note: Solifluction is soil creep caused by waterlogged soil slowly moving downhill on top of an impermeable layer.) which may be caused by greater and more frequent temperature changes. In contrast to Williams Cone, whose surroundings are at least still partially covered with fine ash from its eruption, ash from the Eve Cone eruption has completely eroded away from the surrounding landscape; this suggests Eve Cone is older than Williams Cone.

=== Lava field ===
Nearly all of the lava erupted from Eve Cone appears to have originated from vents around the base of the volcanic edifice. This is particularly evident on the southeastern side of the cone, where there is a nearly 30 m (98 ft) high buttress of overlapping tiers of lava lobes. Streams of lava from these vents merged to form a roughly 12 km (7.5 mi) long lava field which extends down the northern side of the Big Raven Plateau. It has a maximum width of about 6 km (3.7 mi), overlies older lava flows from the Triplex Cones and abuts with older lava flows in the northeast from Sidas Cone. The lava flows forming this field branch out into many narrower lava channels to the north and northwest, the largest of which is approximately 6 km (3.7 mi) long; it reaches the northeastern end of Buckley Lake. A shorter channel just south of Buckley Lake forms a lava bed with the Triplex Cones lava flows.

== Accessibility ==
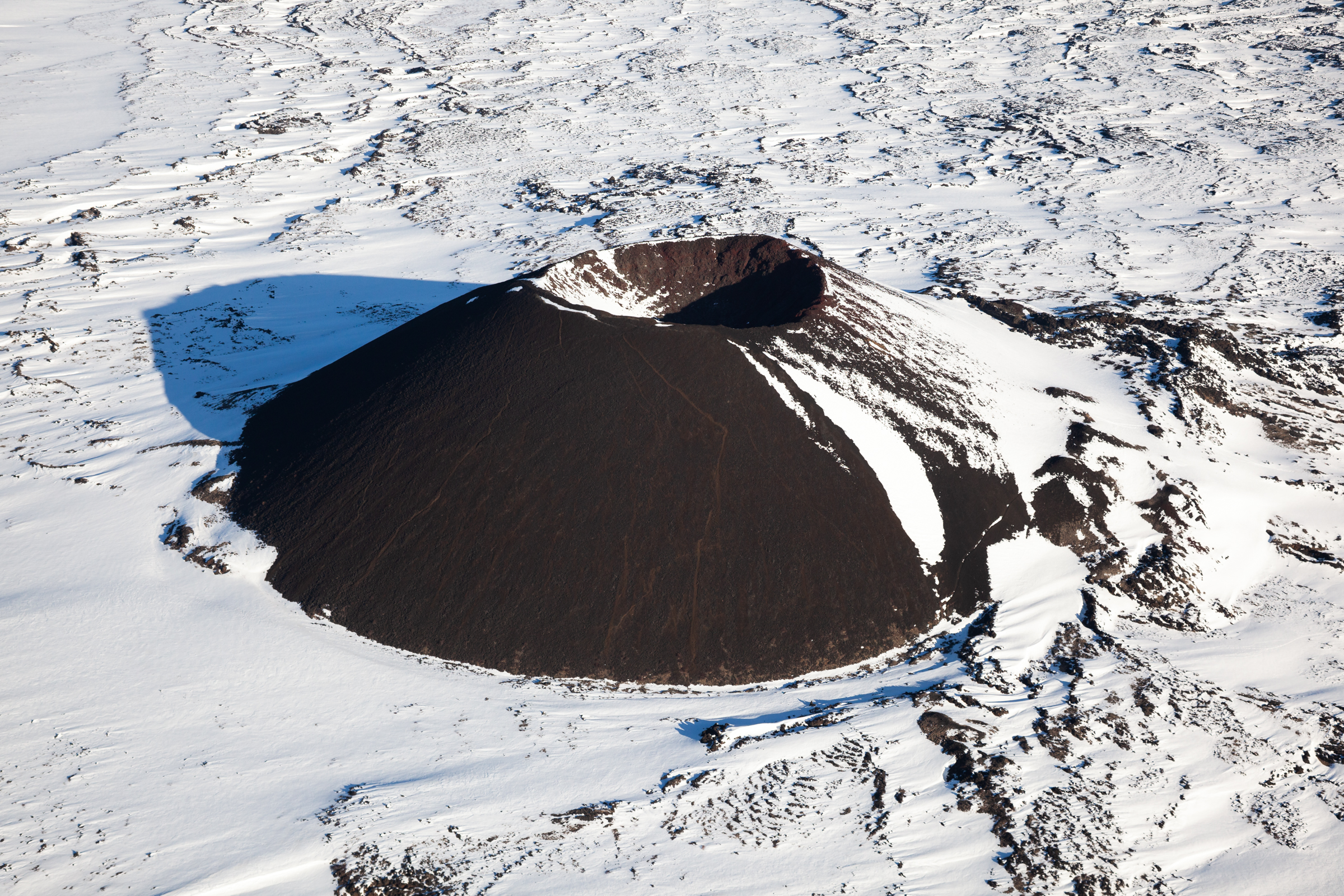
Eve Cone from the southeast

Eve Cone is in a remote location with no established road access. The closest roads are the Stewart–Cassiar Highway to the east and the Telegraph Creek Road to the northwest; both come within 40 km (25 mi) of the cone. Extending from these roads are horse trails that provide access to the Mount Edziza volcanic complex. From Telegraph Creek, the Buckley Lake Trail extends about 15 km (9.3 mi) southeast along Mess Creek and Three Mile Lake. It then traverses about 15 km (9.3 mi) northeast along Dagaichess Creek and Stinking Lake to the northeastern end of Buckley Lake. Here, it meets with the Klastline River Trail and the Buckley Lake to Mowdade Lake Route, the latter of which ascends onto the gently sloping northern side of the plateau.

To the east, the roughly 50 km (31 mi) long Klastline River Trail begins at the community of Iskut on the Stewart–Cassiar Highway; it extends northwest and west along the Klastline River for much of its length. The trail enters Mount Edziza Provincial Park at about 25 km (16 mi) where Kakiddi Creek drains into the Klastline River. After entering Mount Edziza Provincial Park, it traverses northwest along the Klastline River for about 10 km (6.2 mi) and then crosses the river north of the Big Raven Plateau. From there, it traverses west for about 5 km (3.1 mi) to the northeastern end of Buckley Lake where it meets with the Buckley Lake Trail and the Buckley Lake to Mowdade Lake Route.

The Buckley Lake to Mowdade Lake Route traverses south from Buckley Lake along Buckley Creek and gradually climbs onto the northern end of the Big Raven Plateau where Eve Cone and Sidas Cone are visible along the route. BC Parks recommends visitors to ascend Eve Cone using the main trail on its southeastern flank to prevent walking erosion on its delicate surface. This route leads to a small bench on the northeastern side of the cone and provides access to the crater rim. Buckley Lake northwest of Eve Cone is large enough to be used by float-equipped aircraft. However, landing on this lake with a private aircraft requires a letter of authorization from the BC Parks Stikine Senior Park Ranger. Alpine Lakes Air and BC Yukon Air are the only air charter companies permitted to provide access to this area via aircraft.

== See also ==
- List of cinder cones
- List of Northern Cordilleran volcanoes
- List of volcanoes in Canada
- Volcanism of the Mount Edziza volcanic complex
