= Moraine (disambiguation) =

Moraine is rock debris transported by glaciers.

Moraine may also refer to:

== Places ==
- Moraine, Ohio, USA
- Moraine Cone, in British Columbia, Canada
- Moraine Lake, in Banff National Park, Canada
- Moraine State Park, in Pennsylvania
- Moraine Township, Lake County, Illinois, USA

== Other uses ==
- Moiraine Damodred, one of the main characters of The Wheel of Time fantasy series
- Moraine Valley Community College, in Palos Hills, Illinois
