= Klastline Formation =

Geological formation in British Columbia

- Stratigraphic range: Pleistocene; 0.774–0.118 Ma
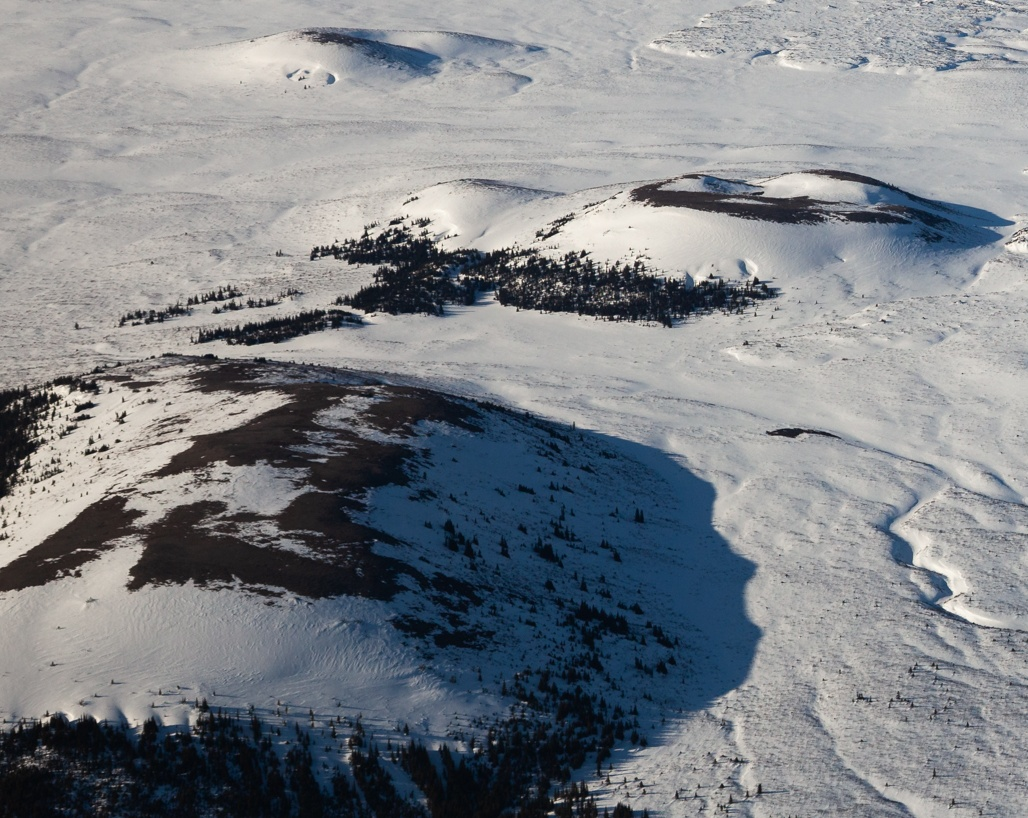
- Glacially modified pyroclastic cones of the Klastline Formation
- Type: Geological formation
- Unit of: Mount Edziza volcanic complex
- Sub-units: Junction Member, Village Member
- Underlies: Big Raven Formation
- Overlies: Edziza Formation

Lithology
- Primary: Alkali basalt

Location
- Coordinates: 57.5°N 130.6°W
- Region: British Columbia
- Country: Canada

Type section
- Named for: Klastline River
- Named by: Souther et al.
- Year defined: 1984

The Klastline Formation is a stratigraphic unit of Pleistocene age in northwestern British Columbia, Canada.

== Description ==
The Klastline Formation is part of the Mount Edziza volcanic complex. This is the second largest eruptive centre in the Northern Cordilleran Volcanic Province, attaining a volume of 670 cubic kilometres (160 cubic miles) and an area of 1,000 square kilometres (390 square miles). It consists of shield volcanoes, stratovolcanoes, cinder cones and lava domes that have formed in the last 12 million years.

The Klastline Formation was emplaced during the fourth magmatic cycle of the Mount Edziza volcanic complex. It consists of volcanic rocks that were issued from at least three eruptive centres on the northern and eastern sides of the Mount Edziza volcanic complex which produced minor lava fountains and small pyroclastic cones. Lava of the Klastline Formation temporarily blocked streams adjacent to the volcanic complex which resulted in the creation of lava dammed lakes.

== Lithology ==
The Klastline Formation consists primarily of alkali basalt flows interbedded with sand and gravel. It contains two named subunits; the Village Member which consists of regular columnar basalt jointing, and the Junction Member which is characterized by swirly jointed basalt. A sedimentary sequence referred to as the Days Ranch Member is preserved between various remnants of the Village Member. It consists of well-sorted sand and gravel.

== Distribution ==
The Klastline Formation has a volume of 5.4 cubic kilometres (1.3 cubic miles), making it one of the least voluminous geological formations of the Mount Edziza volcanic complex. It occurs along the valleys of Kakiddi Creek and the Klastline River where it forms isolated, usually flat-topped erosional remnants with 6-to-12-metre (20-to-39-foot) high escarpments. Klastline Cone on the western side of Kakiddi Valley was the main source of the Klastline Valley flows. Remnants of Klastline Formation basalt flows south of Buckley Lake form scattered outcrops and likely issued from a low, grassy hill surrounded by younger Big Raven Formation basalt flows. A 55-kilometre-long (34-mile) sequence of Klastline Formation basalt flows is exposed along the Stikine River downstream from the Klastline River confluence.

== Age ==
The Klastline Formation was probably deposited over a long period of eruptive activity during the Middle to Late Pleistocene. K–Ar dating of a large remnant of Klastline Formation basalt in Klastline Valley has yielded an age of 0.62 ± 0.04 million years. This age is consistent with its stratigraphic position between the Edziza and Kakiddi formations, which have ages of 0.9 million years and 0.3 million years, respectively. A K–Ar date of 0.33 ± 0.03 million years has been obtained from the top of a Village Member basalt flow on the Tahltan River, suggesting that Klastline volcanism may have been coeval with that of the Kakiddi Formation. Village Member basalt about 2 kilometres (1.2 miles) downstream from the mouth of the Tahltan River on the east bank of the Stikine River has yielded a similar Ar–Ar date of 0.30 ± 0.10 million years.

== See also ==
- Volcanism of the Mount Edziza volcanic complex
