= Kana Cone =

Cinder Cone in the country of Canada

Coordinates: 57.90°N 130.62°W

Kana Cone is a red nested cinder cone in northern British Columbia, Canada, located northeast of Eve Cone in Mount Edziza Provincial Park. The name of the cone was adopted 2 January 1980 on National Topographic System map 104G/12 after being submitted to the BC Geographical Names office by the Geological Survey of Canada, although the cone was labelled as Ashwell Cone on a 1988 Geological Survey of Canada map by Canadian volcanologist Jack Souther.

Porphyritic basalt lava from Kana Cone flowed north and blocked the Klastline River, which incised the lava flow and exposed 20 metres (66 ft) of columnar basalt.

== See also ==
- List of volcanoes in Canada
- List of Northern Cordilleran volcanoes
- Volcanism of Canada
- Volcanism of Western Canada
