= Klastline River =

- Mouth of the Klastline River

Location
- Country: Canada
- Province: British Columbia
- District: Cassiar Land District

Physical characteristics
- Source: Klastline Plateau
  - coordinates: 57°49′45″N 130°07′35″W
  - elevation: 1,210 m (3,970 ft)
- Mouth: Stikine River
  - location: Tahltan Highland
  - coordinates: 58°02′24″N 130°47′10″W
  - elevation: 251 m (823 ft)
- Length: 70 km (43 mi)
- Basin size: 1,841 km^{2} (711 sq mi)
- Discharge
  - average: 21.5 m^{3}/s (760 cu ft/s)

Basin features
- Tributaries
  - left: Buckley Creek, Kakiddi Creek, Tsazia Creek
  - right: Cheeny Creek, Detiaten Creek, Grass Creek, Jokerslide Creek, Konthil Creek, Morchuea Creek
- Topo map: NTS 104G15 Buckley Lake; NTS 104G16 Klastline River; NTS 104J2 Classy Creek

The Klastline River is a tributary of the Stikine River in northwestern British Columbia, Canada. It flows generally northwest about 70 km (43 mi) to join the Stikine River, which flows southwest across the Canada–United States border into Alaska where it empties into various straits of the Inside Passage. The Klastline River flows through Mount Edziza Provincial Park which lies within the traditional territory of the Tahltan people. Klastline means "confluence" or "junction of waters" in the Tahltan language.

The Klastline River's watershed covers 1,841 km^{2} (711 sq mi) and its estimated mean annual discharge is 21.5 m^{3}/s (760 cu ft/s). The mouth of the Klastline River is located about 27 km (17 mi) northeast of Telegraph Creek, about 52 km (32 mi) northwest of Iskut and about 64 km (40 mi) southwest of Dease Lake. The Klastline River's watershed's land cover is classified as 45% conifer forest, 21.2% shrubland, 11.9% barren, 8.2% mixed forest, 7.6% herbaceous, and small amounts of other cover.

== Geography ==
The Klastline River originates in a valley on the Klastline Plateau between Tsazia Mountain and Mount Poelzer. From its source the Klastline River flows about 5 km (3.1 mi) north to the southern base of an unnamed circular, flat-topped mountain. It then flows generally west for about 30 km (19 mi) to the northeastern side of the Big Raven Plateau. From there, the Klastline River flows generally northwest for about 30 km (19 mi) along the northern end of the Big Raven Plateau through the Tahltan Highland to the western end of the Grand Canyon of the Stikine where it joins the Stikine River.

The Klastline River contains six named right tributaries. The first one is Morchuea Creek which flows southwest into the Klastline River. Konthil Creek is the second named right tributary which flows southwest into the Klastline River just northwest of Iskut. The third right tributary is Grass Creek which flows south into the Klastline River. Jokerslide Creek, the fourth named right tributary, flows southwest into the Klastline River. The fifth named right tributary, Cheeny Creek, flows southwest into the Klastine River east of Telegraph Creek. The sixth named right tributary is Detiaten Creek which flows west into the Klastline River just northeast of Telegraph Creek.

Only three left tributaries of the Klastline River are named. The first one is Tsazia Creek which flows north into the Klastline River. Kakiddi Creek, the second named left tributary, flows north into the Klastline River. The third named left tributary is Buckley Creek which flows northeast into the Klastline River east of Telegraph Creek.

The roughly 50 km-long (31 mi) Klastline River Trail begins at the community of Iskut on the Stewart–Cassiar Highway. It extends northwest and west along the Klastline River for much its length. The trail enters Mount Edziza Provincial Park at about 25 km (16 mi) where Kakiddi Creek drains into the Klastline River. After entering Mount Edziza Provincial Park, the Klastline River Trail traverses northwest along the Klastline River for about 10 km (6.2 mi) and then crosses the river at the northern end of Mount Edziza Provincial Park. From there, the Klastline River Trail traverses west for about 15 km (9.3 mi) to the northeastern end of Buckley Lake where it meets with the Buckley Lake Trail and Buckley Lake to Mowdade Lake Route junction.

== Geology ==
The Klastline River has been repeatedly blocked by lava flows from the adjacent Mount Edziza volcanic complex. In the Pleistocene, massive basalt flows from at least three eruptive centres on the northern side of the volcanic complex entered the narrow valley of the Klastline River from Kakiddi Valley, temporarily blocking it to form a large shallow lake upstream. The main source of these lava flows was Klastline Cone and are assigned to the Klastline Formation. Erosional remnants of the Klastline lava flows form small buttes and buttresses along Klastline Valley.

At least three cinder cones of the Mount Edziza volcanic complex blocked the Klastline River during the Holocene. Moraine Cone produced a northeasterly lava flow that temporarily blocked both Kakiddi Creek and the Klastine River. Subsequent etching of new channels around or through the flows by both streams has exposed beds of lacustrine silt where lava-dammed lakes ponded upstream. Lava flows from Kana Cone also temporarily blocked the Klastline River and may have travelled Klastline Valley as far west as the Stikine River. The Klastline River was forced to establish a new route along the northern valley wall where it still flows to this day. Williams Cone produced a more than 10 km-long (6.2 mi) lava flow into Klastline Valley where its distal lobe formed a temporary dam across the Klastline River. All three cinder cones and associated lava flows are assigned to the Big Raven Formation.

== See also ==
- List of rivers of British Columbia
