= Sleet Cone =

Cinder cone in British Columbia, Canada

Coordinates: 57.78°N 130.55°W

Sleet Cone is a cinder cone in northern British Columbia, Canada. It lies in the Desolation Lava Field and is thought to have last erupted in the Holocene period and is part of the Mount Edziza volcanic complex.

== See also ==
- List of volcanoes in Canada
- List of Northern Cordilleran volcanoes
- Volcanology of Canada
- Volcanology of Western Canada
