= Triplex Cones =

Cinder cone in the country of Canada

Coordinates: 57.80°N 130.62°W

The Triplex Cones are a group of three cinder cones in northern British Columbia, Canada. They are thought to have last erupted during the Holocene epoch.

== See also ==
- List of volcanoes in Canada
- List of Northern Cordilleran volcanoes
- Volcanism of Canada
- Volcanism of Western Canada
