= Storm Cone =

Volcano in British Columbia, Canada

Coordinates: 57.77°N 130.63°W

Storm Cone is a cinder cone in northern British Columbia, Canada. It is thought to have last erupted in the Holocene period and lies on the Desolation lava field which is part of the Mount Edziza volcanic complex.

== See also ==
- List of volcanoes in Canada
- List of Northern Cordilleran volcanoes
- Volcanology of Canada
- Volcanology of Western Canada
