= Twin Cone =

Cinder cone in British Columbia, Canada

Coordinates: 57.80°N 130.53°W

Twin Cone is a cinder cone in northern British Columbia, Canada. It is thought to have last erupted in the Holocene period.

== See also ==
- List of volcanoes in Canada
- List of Northern Cordilleran volcanoes
- Volcanism of Canada
- Volcanism of Western Canada
- Northern Cordilleran Volcanic Province
