= Sidas Cone =

Cinder cone in Canada

- Location within British Columbia
- Interactive map of Sidas Cone

Highest point
- Elevation: 1,543 m (5,062 ft)
- Prominence: 92 m (302 ft)
- Coordinates: 57°51′31″N 130°37′49″W

Geography
- Location: British Columbia, Canada
- District: Cassiar Land District
- Parent range: Tahltan Highland
- Topo map: NTS 104G15 Buckley Lake

Geology
- Rock age: Holocene
- Mountain type: Cinder cone
- Volcanic zone: Northern Cordilleran Volcanic Province
- Last eruption: Holocene

Sidas Cone is a cinder cone on the Big Raven Plateau at the northern end of Mount Edziza Provincial Park in British Columbia, Canada. Its name, meaning "cut oneself with a knife" in the Tahltan language, is descriptive of the breach that has cut the cone into two symmetrical halves.

== See also ==
- Northern Cordilleran Volcanic Province
- Volcanism of Canada
- List of volcanoes in Canada
- List of Northern Cordilleran volcanoes
- Volcanism of Western Canada
