= Moraine Cone =

Cinder cone in the country of Canada

Coordinates: 57.77°N 130.62°W

Moraine Cone is a cinder cone in northern British Columbia, Canada. It is thought to have last erupted in the Holocene period and is part of the Mount Edziza volcanic complex.

== See also ==
- List of volcanoes in Canada
- List of Northern Cordilleran volcanoes
- Volcanism of Canada
- Volcanism of Western Canada
