= Buckley Lake (British Columbia) =

Lake in British Columbia, Canada

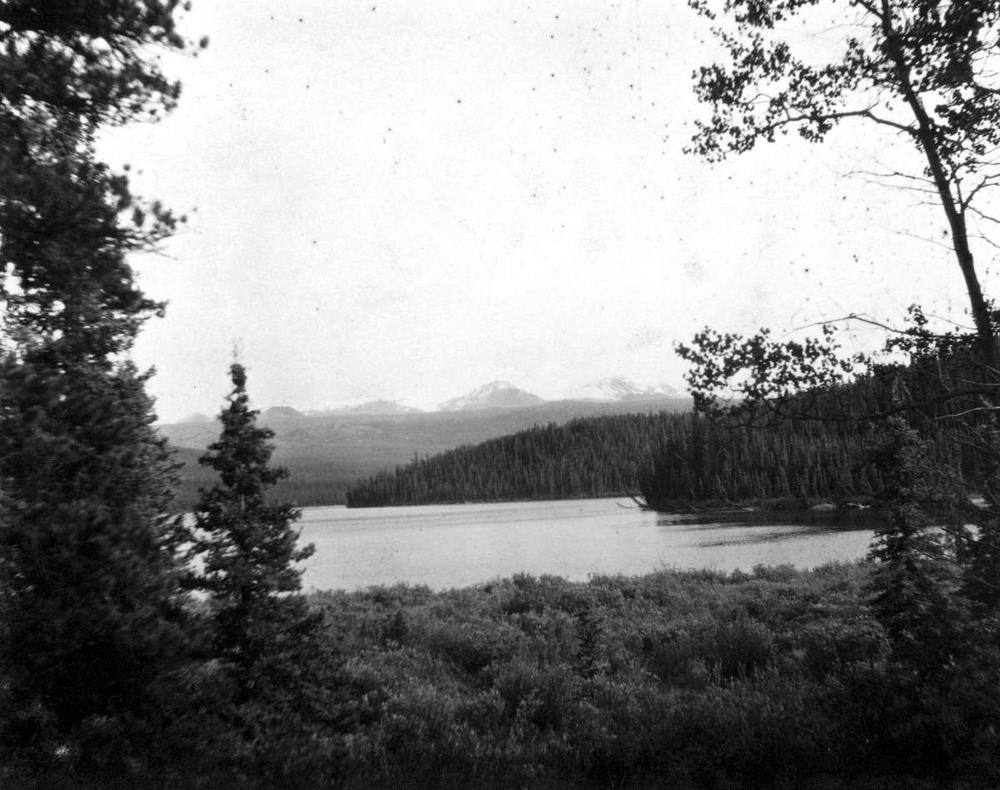
- Buckley Lake in 1912 with Mount Edziza in the background

- Location: British Columbia, Canada
- Coordinates: 57°54′20″N 130°46′41″W

Buckley Lake, elevation 841 m (2,759 ft), is a lake in the Tahltan Highland of the Stikine Plateau in northwestern British Columbia, Canada. It is located east of Telegraph Creek at the north end of Mount Edziza Provincial Park. The primary outflow of Buckley Lake is Buckley Creek, which flows northeast into the Klastline River.

== See also ==
- List of lakes of British Columbia
