= Tenchen Member =

Geological member in British Columbia, Canada

- Stratigraphic range: Pliocene; 4.4 Ma
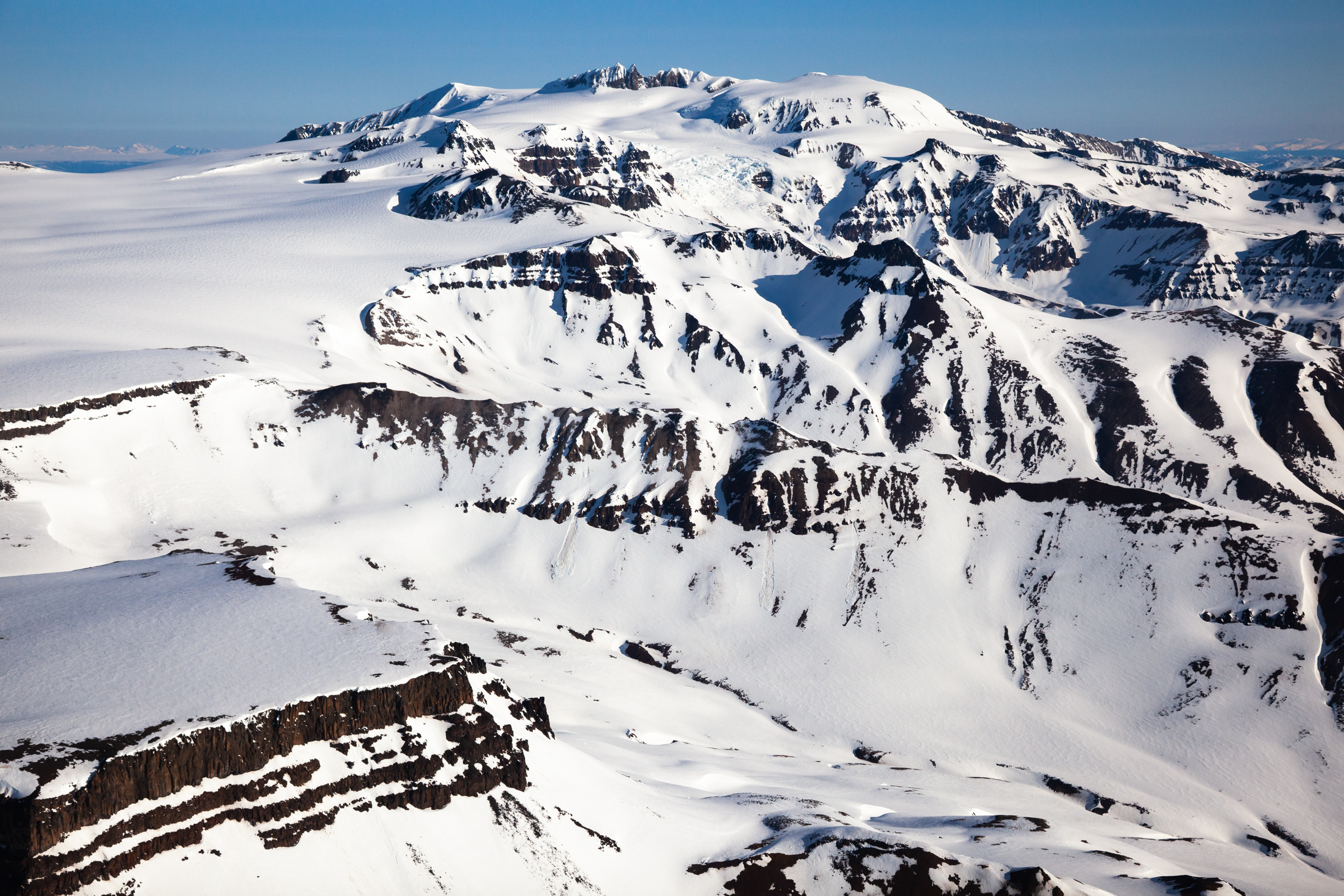
- Kaia Bluff in the lower-left corner consists of alkali basalt of the Tenchen Member
- Type: Geological member
- Unit of: Nido Formation
- Underlies: Big Raven Formation, Pillow Ridge Formation, Pyramid Formation, Edziza Formation, Kakiddi Formation, Ice Peak Formation
- Overlies: Raspberry Formation, Armadillo Formation

Lithology
- Primary: Alkali basalt
- Other: Hawaiite, picrite

Location
- Coordinates: 57°38′15″N 130°36′10″W (Note: The coordinates are for Kaia Bluff, consists of alkali basalt of the Tenchen Member.)
- Region: British Columbia
- Country: Canada

Type section
- Named for: Tenchen Creek
- Named by: Jack Souther, 1988

The Tenchen Member is a stratigraphic unit of Pliocene age in northwestern British Columbia, Canada. It is one of two members forming the Nido Formation, the other being the Kounugu Member to the south. It also forms part of the Mount Edziza volcanic complex (MEVC), which has a history of volcanism that spans more than seven million years. Underlying the Tenchen Member are the Raspberry and Armadillo formations of the MEVC. They have average ages of 7.4 and 6.3 million years, respectively. The overlying Pyramid, Ice Peak, Pillow Ridge, Edziza and Big Raven formations, also part of the MEVC, were deposited in the last 1.1 million years.

The Tenchen Member consists of alkali basalt and minor hawaiite and picrite. These volcanic rocks are in form of lava flows and tephra, which were issued from at least three major and several smaller eruptive centres. The eastern portions of many of these eruptive centres are now deeply eroded to expose several dikes, plugs and subvolcanic intrusions. Lava flows of the Tenchen Member are exposed in cliffs bounding the Big Raven Plateau and on ridges east of Mount Edziza. Radiometric dating of the member has yielded ages ranging from 5.5 to 4.4 million years old, but an average age of 4.4 million years has been provided for it.

== Name and etymology ==
The Tenchen Member was named in 1988 by Jack Souther, Canada's first volcanologist. It first appeared on a 1988 geological map of the Mount Edziza volcanic complex (MEVC), which was extensively studied by Souther for more than two decades. Taking its name from Tenchen Creek where rocks of the Tenchen Member are exposed in cliffs along the northern side of this stream, it is also the namesake of Tenchen Glacier. The creek and glacier were both officially named in 1980 after being approved by the BC Geographical Names office in Victoria. Tenchen is a combination of the Tahltan words ten and chen, which mean 'ice' and 'dirty', respectively. It is a reference to Tenchen Glacier being completely covered by rockfall debris originating from bounding spurs and the steep headwall.

== Stratigraphy ==
Location in British Columbia, Canada

The Tenchen Member is one of two stratigraphic units composing the Nido Formation, the other being the Kounugu Member to the south. It includes all of the Nido Formation north of the Armadillo Highlands where they occur in strata of the Big Raven Plateau. Exposures along the western and northwestern sides of the plateau occur in the Mess Creek Escarpment and in the canyon of Elwyn Creek, respectively. At both locations, the Tenchen Member is in the form of thin lava flows with columnar jointing. Erosion has removed much of the eastern portion of the member where remnants linger on ridges east of Mount Edziza. The remnants consist of lava flows and thick piles of tephra.

=== Overlying units ===
The Tenchen Member is overlain by five younger geological formations of the MEVC, the oldest of which is the 1.1-million-year-old Pyramid Formation. It overlies the member along the eastern side of the Big Raven Plateau and consists mostly of comendite, trachyte and pantellerite. An up to 65 m (213 ft) thick sequence of basalt flows overlies a pyroclastic surge deposit at the base of the Pyramid Formation. The approximately 1-million-year-old Ice Peak Formation overlies much of the Tenchen Member in the middle of the Big Raven Plateau. It is structurally and petrographically complex, consisting of alkali basalt, hawaiite, mugearite, benmoreite and trachyte.

In the middle of the Big Raven Plateau, the Tenchen Member is overlain by the 0.9-million-year-old Pillow Ridge and Edziza formations. The Pillow Ridge Formation is limited to the Pillow and Tsekone ridges, which consist of alkali basalt and hawaiite, respectively. In contrast, the dominantly trachytic Edziza Formation forms the central stratovolcano of Mount Edziza. Exposures of the 0.3-million-year-old trachytic Kakiddi Formation occur on the eastern and southwestern flanks of Ice Peak. The less than 20,000-year-old Big Raven Formation consists almost entirely of alkali basalt and hawaiite. It overlies the Tenchen Member at the northern and southern ends of the Big Raven Plateau.

=== Underlying units ===
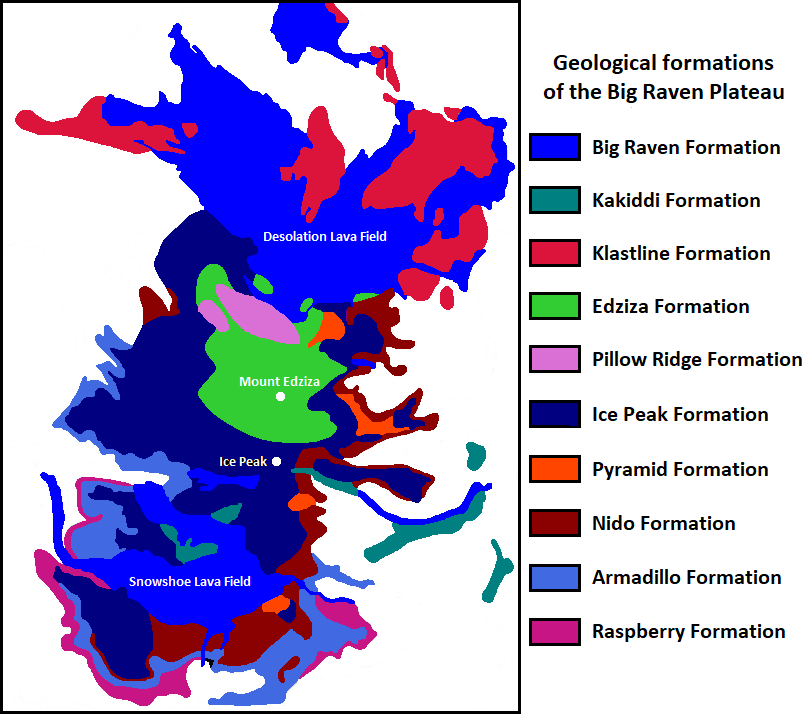
The extent of the Tenchen Member herein referred to as the Nido Formation

The Tenchen Member is underlain by two older formations of the MEVC. Comendite and trachyte of the 6.3-million-year-old Armadillo Formation underlie the southern portion of the member. These rocks, which are in the form of pumice, ash flows and tuff, were erupted from a cluster of vents on and around Armadillo Peak to the south. Basaltic lava flows of the 7.4-million-year-old Raspberry Formation occur in strata of the Mess Creek Escarpment, as well as on and around Cartoona Ridge. The Raspberry flows in the Mess Creek Escarpment were issued from a shield volcano that formed on a Late Miocene landscape. In contrast, the Raspberry flows exposed on and around Cartoona Ridge issued from an eruptive centre further to the northeast. This eruptive centre, referred to as the North Craters, was on or east of a highland.

In the canyon of Elwyn Creek at the northwestern end of the Big Raven Plateau, the Tenchen Member is underlain by leucogranite of the Elwyn Creek Pluton. This 5 km (3.1 mi) wide pluton is of Eocene age and is part of the Sloko Group, which formed in a continental arc setting as early as the Late Cretaceous. Peripheral to the Elwyn Creek Pluton is gently tilted sedimentary strata of the Sustut Group. This geological group consists of siltstone, sandstone, shale, arkose, conglomerate and minor coal that was deposited during the Cretaceous and Paleocene. The member is also underlain by Paleozoic and Mesozoic sedimentary, volcanic or metamorphic rocks of the Stikinia terrane, which accreted to the continental margin of North America during the Jurassic.

== Volcanology ==
The Tenchen Member was deposited by at least three major and several smaller eruptive centres during the second magmatic cycle of the MEVC between six and one million years ago. Individual eruptive centres are widely separated and formed along the eastern edge of the volcanic complex, mainly in a north–south trending zone. All of them are the products of a long period of volcanic activity and are now deeply eroded; the remains are considered to be of shield volcanoes. The feeder systems of many of these eruptive centres are exposed east of the Big Raven Plateau where the Tenchen Member has mostly eroded away. They crop out in steep-walled valleys as several dikes, plugs and subvolcanic intrusions. Highly mobile, fluid lava from the eruptive centres flooded an area of more than 350 km^{2} (140 mi^{2}) to form a field of overlapping lava flows. Glacial deposits under the Tenchen Member contain clasts from the Armadillo Highlands, as do glacial deposits under the Kounugu Member. This suggests that both members were formed by volcanism more or less simultaneously.

=== Alpha Peak ===
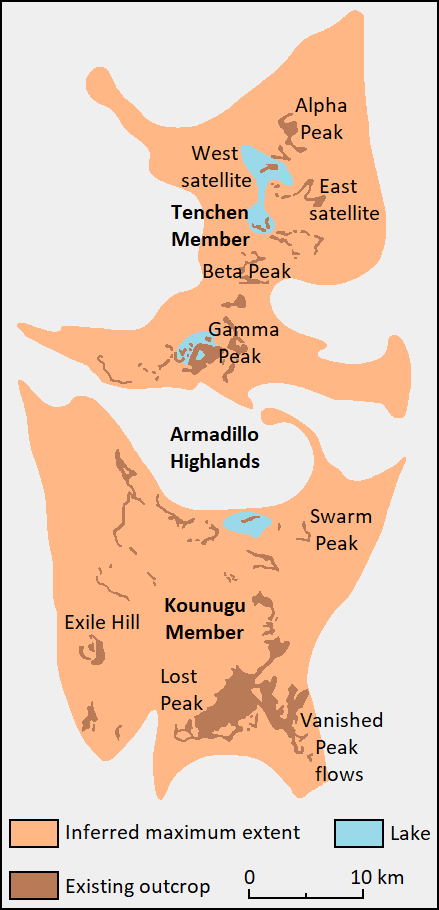
Paleogeological map of the Nido Formation at the end of the Nido eruptive period

The northernmost and oldest major eruptive centre, Alpha Peak, is considered to have been adjacent to The Pyramid of the younger Pyramid Formation partially due to the distribution of tephra in that area. Cliffs containing 50 to 60% coarse tephra occur along the southern side of Pyramid Creek, but the actual vent and conduit system of this eruptive centre remains unexposed. Bright red spindle and cow pie bombs up to 0.6 m (2.0 ft) wide occur in the tephra. Lava flows interlayered in the tephra contain rough hackly surfaces and are randomly jointed and highly vesicular. The Alpha shield was at times nearly surrounded by northward-flowing outlet glaciers of an ice cap that covered the Armadillo Highlands.

Alkali basalt is the main volcanic rock composing the Alpha shield. Lava flows are more or less randomly interbedded with lenses of gravel, as well as minor sand and silt. Clasts of chert-pebble conglomerate derived from the Late Triassic Bowser Group are present in fluvial beds below an elevation of about 1,525 m (5,003 ft), as are trachyte, rhyolite and obsidian clasts derived from the Armadillo Formation. At higher elevations are well-rounded, hematite-stained clasts mainly composed of basalt.

=== Beta Peak ===
About 12 km (7.5 mi) to the south, Beta Peak began to form during the late stages of Alpha volcanism when several vents issued thin, coalescing basaltic lava flows. Remnants of this small shield volcano are exposed on the eastern flank of Mount Edziza between the Tenchen and Sorcery creeks where flat-lying, columnar-jointed lava flows form prominent step-like outcrops. Lava flows of the Beta shield on Sorcery Ridge are overlain by tephra believed to be the remains of a pyroclastic cone. It consists of lava bombs and volcanic blocks that are enclosed by loosely agglutinated spatter and lapilli. At its climax, the pyroclastic cone rose at least 365 m (1,198 ft) above the surrounding surface of the Beta shield.

Most of Beta Peak consists of alkali basalt, but hawaiite forms the uppermost lava flows. The presence of hawaitte suggests that some alkali basalt underwent partial crystal fractionation and feldspar accumulation prior to eruption. Although lava flows from Alpha Peak are widely interbedded with glacial deposits, there is little evidence for glaciovolcanism having occurred at the shield volcano. About 30 m (98 ft) of crystal-rich, sideromelane tuff breccia exists on Idiji Ridge. It is hawaiitic in composition and may have formed when hawaiite lava was extruded into water ponded by ice.

=== Gamma Peak ===
Gamma Peak, the southernmost and second oldest major eruptive centre, began to form with the eruption of thin basaltic lava flows from a vent at the western end of Cartoona Ridge. These lava flows overlie ash of the Armadillo Formation and travelled along the northern side of the Armadillo Highlands as far west as the Mess Creek Escarpment where they are exposed. Later, the northward-flowing outlet glaciers originating from the Armadillo Highlands eventually covered the Gamma shield. Subglacial volcanism under these glaciers formed a meltwater lake above the Gamma shield, whose surface was penetrated by explosions resulting from lava-water interactions. After the ice had receded, a fragile pile of basaltic tuff breccia formed by the earlier subaqueous activity was buried under subaerial lava up to 90 m (300 ft) thick from renewed eruptions. Thin basaltic lava flows more than 6.5 km (4.0 mi) long spread to the west.

Eroded remnants of the Gamma shield include Cartoona Peak and Kaia Bluff. Cartoona Peak is a prominent black spire overlying the central vent of the Gamma shield. It consists of a lower unit of subaerial lava flows, a central unit of subaqueous tuff breccia and an upper unit of subaerial lava flows. Alkali basalt is the main volcanic rock composing these units, although the upper unit grades locally into picrite. Kaia Bluff consists mainly of lava flows of the upper unit; they are interbedded with gravel.

== Limnology ==
The disruption of drainage patterns by lava flows issued during the Nido eruptive period resulted in the formation of several lava-dammed lakes. One of these lakes, referred to as Palagonite Lake by Jack Souther, is inferred to have existed between Alpha Peak and Beta Peak throughout most of their eruptive history. Its existence is supported by the presence of fluvial gravel deposits and volcanic deposits that show evidence of having interacted with water upon eruption. For example, the south buttress of Alpha Peak contains a thick pile of pillow lava, subaqueous landslide debris and sideromelane tuff breccia. About midway between Alpha Peak and Beta Peak, a similar deposit of yellow-brown tuff breccia is exposed in cliffs near the source of Nido Creek. The tuff breccia in both locations passes up into subaerial lava flows at an elevation of about 1,860 m (6,100 ft) where Palagonite Lake is suggested to have peaked.

For the lake to have reached an elevation of about 1,860 m (6,100 ft), its eastern and western margins had to have been contained by higher terrain. It is possible that these margins were dammed by lava flows from satellitic cones that have since been destroyed by erosion. One such centre may have existed southeast of Alpha Peak at the eastern end of Nido Ridge. Here, lava flows are interbedded with bombs in easterly thickening wedges of pyroclastic rocks. Another satellitic cone may have existed southwest of Alpha Peak, but no Tenchen rocks are exposed. The existence of an ice dam during the formation of Palagonite Lake is considered to be unlikely due to lack of evidence. The lake drained during the final stages of Tenchen volcanism when the eastern barrier was breached by stream erosion.

== Age ==
At least three potassium–argon dates have been obtained from samples of the Tenchen Member. Analytical precision of the two youngest dates, 4.4 ± 0.5 million years and 4.5 ± 0.3 million years, gives an average age of 4.4 million years. This age places the Tenchen Member in the Pliocene and has also been used as the average age of the Nido Formation. The oldest date, 5.5 ± 1.6 million years, has a large error and may be anomalously old. Rocks with high atmospheric argon content, such as the sample this date was obtained from, are susceptible of producing erroneous ages. The average age of the Tenchen Member increases only to 4.5 million years if the oldest date is included.
