= Edziza Formation =

Geological formation in British Columbia, Canada

- Stratigraphic range: Pleistocene; 0.9 Ma
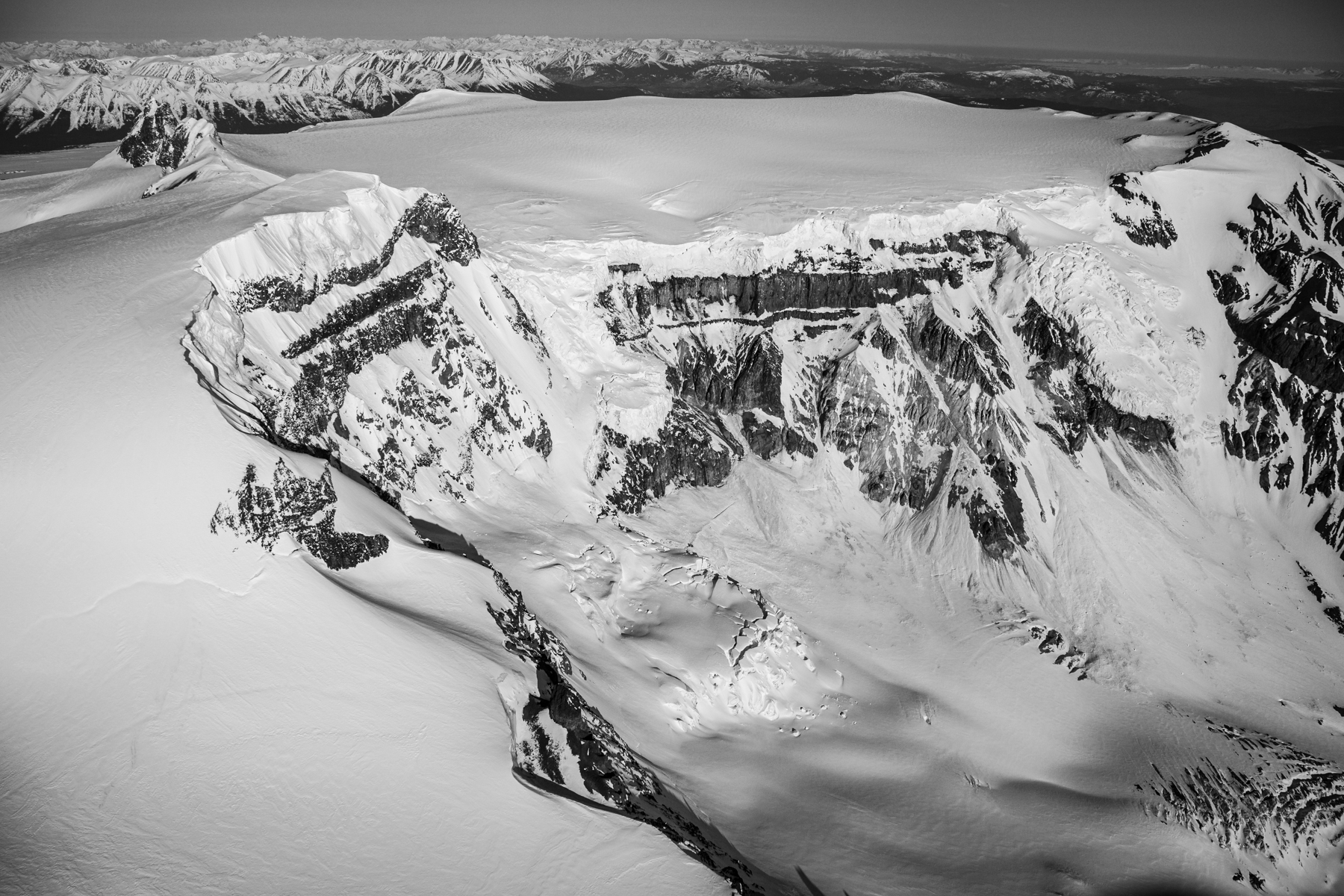
- The ice-filled summit crater of Mount Edziza
- Type: Geological formation
- Unit of: Mount Edziza volcanic complex
- Underlies: Big Raven Formation
- Overlies: Pillow Ridge Formation, Ice Peak Formation, Pyramid Formation, Nido Formation

Lithology
- Primary: Trachyte

Location
- Coordinates: 57.72°N 130.63°W
- Region: British Columbia
- Country: Canada

Type section
- Named for: Mount Edziza
- Named by: Souther et al., 1984
- Location in Mount Edziza Provincial Park

The Edziza Formation (/ədˈzaɪzə/ əd-ZY-zə) is a stratigraphic unit of Pleistocene age in northwestern British Columbia, Canada. First described in 1984, the Edziza Formation was mapped as one of several geological formations of the Mount Edziza volcanic complex. It overlies at least four other geological formations of this volcanic complex that differ in age and composition. The main volcanic rock comprising the Edziza Formation is trachyte which was deposited by volcanic eruptions at the end of the third magmatic cycle of the Mount Edziza volcanic complex 0.9 million years ago.

Trachyte of the Edziza Formation is in the form of lava flows and pyroclastic rocks that comprise the central stratovolcano of Mount Edziza, as well as lava domes on its summit and flanks. At least four lava lakes ponded inside the summit crater which cooled into four rock units that are exposed in the breached eastern crater rim. These lava lakes overlie rock fragments inside the central volcanic conduit which accompanied with collapse of a narrower and higher summit.

== Etymology ==
A number of explanations have been made regarding the origin of the name Edziza. A 1927 report by J. Davidson of the British Columbia Land Surveyors claims that Edziza means "sand" in the Tahltan language, referring to the deep volcanic ash deposits or pumice-like sand covering large portions of the Big Raven Plateau around Mount Edziza. According to David Stevenson of University of Victoria's Anthropology Department, "sand" or "dust" is instead translated as "kutlves" in the Tahltan language. An explanation listed in the BC Parks brochure is that Edziza means "cinders" in the Tahltan language. Another explanation proposed by Canadian volcanologist Jack Souther is that Edziza is a corruption of Edzerza, the name of a local Tahltan family.

== History ==
The Edziza Formation was first defined by Jack Souther, Richard Lee Armstrong and J. Harakal in 1984 who grouped it together with the Pillow Ridge Formation in their descriptions and mapping. It was mapped as one of 15 geological formations of the Mount Edziza volcanic complex, a group of late Cenozoic volcanic rocks in northwestern British Columbia, Canada. In 1988, Jack Souther mapped the Edziza and Pillow Ridge formations separately and the number of geological formations comprising the volcanic complex was dropped to 13; the Sheep Track and Kounugu formations were reassigned as members of the Big Raven and Nido formations, respectively, and are no longer recognized.

== Location ==
Nearly all of the Edziza Formation is located on the east-central edge of the Big Raven Plateau, a barren plateau in Cassiar Land District bounded on the west by Mess Valley, on the north by Klastline Valley, on the east by Kakiddi Valley and on the south by Chakima and Walkout valleys, the latter two of which are separated by mountainous terrain. It lies at the northern end of the Mount Edziza volcanic complex which also includes the smaller Arctic Lake and Kitsu plateaus to the south. This complex of shield volcanoes, stratovolcanoes, lava domes, calderas and cinder cones forms a broad, intermontane plateau at the eastern edge of the Tahltan Highland, a southeast-trending upland area extending along the western side of the Stikine Plateau. Small portions of the Edziza Formation occur north, northwest and southwest of Nuttlude Lake which is an expansion of Kakiddi Creek.

== Stratigraphy ==
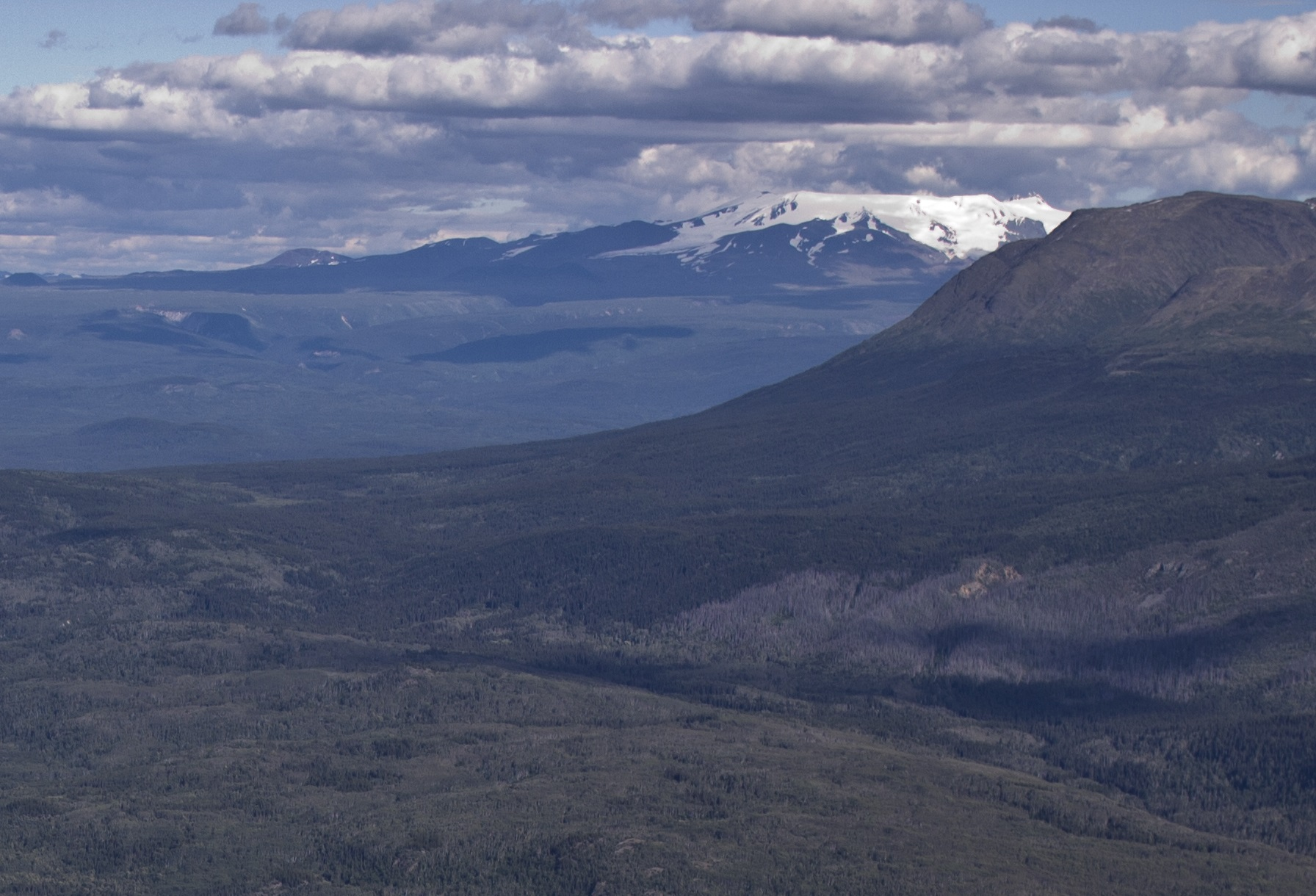
Mount Edziza as seen from Mount Glenora in the northwest

Stratigraphically, the Edziza Formation is the fifth youngest unit of the Mount Edziza volcanic complex, having been deposited over the Nido, Pyramid, Ice Peak and Pillow Ridge formations. It has a volume of 18 cubic kilometres (4.3 cubic miles), making it the sixth most voluminous geological formation of the Mount Edziza volcanic complex after the Ice Peak Formation. The Edziza Formation is also the youngest geological formation of the Mount Edziza volcanic complex involving more than 10 km^{3} (2.4 mi^{3}) of volcanic material.

Basalt flows of the 4.4-million-year-old Nido Formation are overlain by the Edziza Formation on the eastern flank of Mount Edziza between Tenchen Creek and The Pyramid where they overlie a ridge of Mesozoic basement rocks. The Edziza Formation overlies the westernmost portion of Sphinx Dome, a rhyolite dome of the 1.1-million-year-old Pyramid Formation; two thick remnants of the Edziza Formation also occur on the steep northern and southern flanks of this dome.

Basalt flows of the roughly 1-million-year-old Ice Peak Formation are overlain by the Edziza Formation which overlaps with the northern flank of Ice Peak. The 0.9-million-year-old Pillow Ridge Formation is sparsely overlain by the Edziza Formation, but much larger portions of the Edziza Formation overlap with the western and northern edges of Pillow and Tsekone ridges, respectively. Hawaiite and patches of air-fall tephra assigned to the Holocene Big Raven Formation overlie the northern end of the Edziza Formation where they are part of the Desolation Lava Field.

== Lithology ==
The Edziza Formation consists mainly of trachyte that was erupted 0.9 million years ago at the end of the third magmatic cycle of the Mount Edziza volcanic complex. Its composition straddles near the pantelleritic trachyte/comenditic trachyte boundary and is in the form of explosion breccias, lava flows and lava domes. The trachyte contains a matrix of sodic plagioclase alkali feldspar, katophorite, arfvedsonite, aenigmatite and opaque oxides that is embedded with sparse phenocrysts of anorthoclase and sodic ferrohedenbergite. Edziza trachyte is mineralogically similar to trachyte of the Kakiddi Formation which was erupted 0.3 million years ago during the final stages of the fourth magmatic cycle. However, the Kakiddi trachyte flows travelled along gently sloping valleys for at least 10 km (6.2 mi), suggesting that they were extruded more fluidly than those of the Edziza Formation.

=== Stratovolcano ===
The main feature consisting of Edziza Formation trachyte is the central stratovolcano of Mount Edziza. It comprises explosion breccias, landslide or lahar deposits and thick, steeply-dipping flows that were erupted as highly viscous lava. These rocks are well-exposed in 850-metre-high (2,790-foot) cliffs on the eastern flank of Mount Edziza where they occur along the north side of Tenchen Valley. This section of the stratovolcano contains a lower assemblage of chaotic explosion breccias and an upper assemblage of lava that overlies the breccias. Lava of the upper assemblage is highly irregular or lenticular in cross section, but it contains individual cooling units as much as 150 m (490 ft) thick.

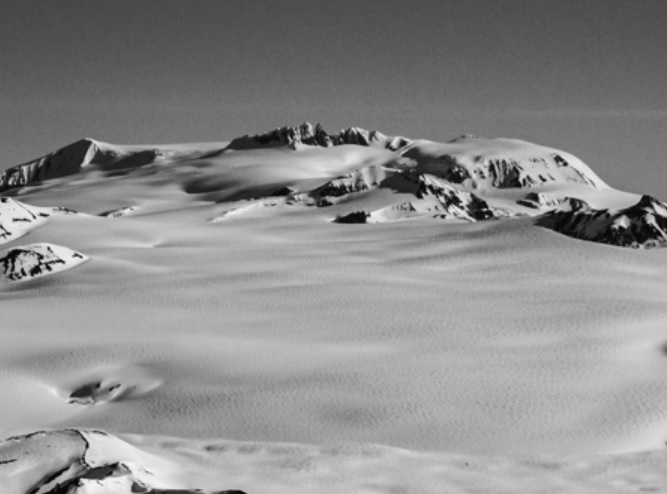
The summit of Mount Edziza

The lower assemblage encloses up to 120 m (390 ft) long and 15 m (49 ft) thick lavas that occur as relatively small, crudely jointed, irregular masses and discontinuous lenses. Extremely coarse breccias occur in the western proximity and contain massive, up to 7.5 m (25 ft) wide volcanic blocks that were probably deposited directly from the central conduit during eruption. At the eastern end of Tenchen Valley are more distal breccias that rarely contain volcanic blocks more than 1.5 m (4.9 ft) wide. Local rounding and stratification of these breccias is indicative of lahar or landslide deposition.

Exposed in the steep Tenchen cirque headwall are large volcanic blocks and small breccia fragments within the central conduit that accompanied with collapse of a narrower summit with a much smaller crater. The collapse may have been caused by a violent, climactic eruption, effusion of the Kakiddi lava flows or the outpouring of voluminous lava during dome formation. Prior to collapse, the summit of Mount Edziza was at least 610 m (2,000 ft) higher than its current elevation of 2,786 m (9,140 ft).

==== Summit crater ====
The broad, nearly flat summit of Mount Edziza is truncated by a 3 km (1.9 mi) wide crater that formed after collapse of the original summit. A circular ridge surrounding this ice-filled crater is partially exposed above the ice cap as a discontinuous series of spires and serrated nunataks. Spires forming the southern end of the ridge are the highest and consist of greenish grey, sparsely porphyritic trachyte. They comprise well-formed, small diameter rock columns that rise nearly vertically for more than 90 m (300 ft) above the ice cap. Nunataks elsewhere on the summit ridge are more subdued, consisting of pyroclastic debris that has been glacially reworked.

The remnants of several lava lakes are exposed inside the crater where the eastern side of the summit ridge has been breached by active cirques. They overlie breccia of the central conduit and are in the form of at least four cooling units. Trachyte with well-developed columnar jointing forms the lower two units, each of which is about 30 m (98 ft) thick. The two upper units consist of lighter green trachyte; the lower unit has a thickness of nearly 90 m (300 ft). Well-developed, vertical and rectangularly jointed trachyte forms this unit and comprises a shear cliff across the full width of the Tenchen cirque headwall. The uppermost unit is largely buried under overhanging ice, but it appears to consist of agglutinated volcanic blocks.

==== Subvolcanic intrusions ====
Exposed in the underlying basement rocks on the deeply eroded eastern flank of Mount Edziza are subvolcanic trachyte cupolas, sills, dikes and irregular intrusive masses linked to the magma plumbing system. Dikes are present as swarms and are usually vertical or subvertical, having been distributed in a crudely radial pattern towards the summit crater. They individually range in thickness from a few centimetres to nearly 2 km (1.2 mi) and occur both within the stratovolcano and in the underlying basement rocks. Cupolas occur throughout Tenchen Valley as 3 to 9 m (9.8 to 29.5 ft) wide projections through thick pyroclastic deposits and resemble inverted sand castings up to 12 m (39 ft) high where the breccia has eroded away.

==== Hydrothermal alteration ====
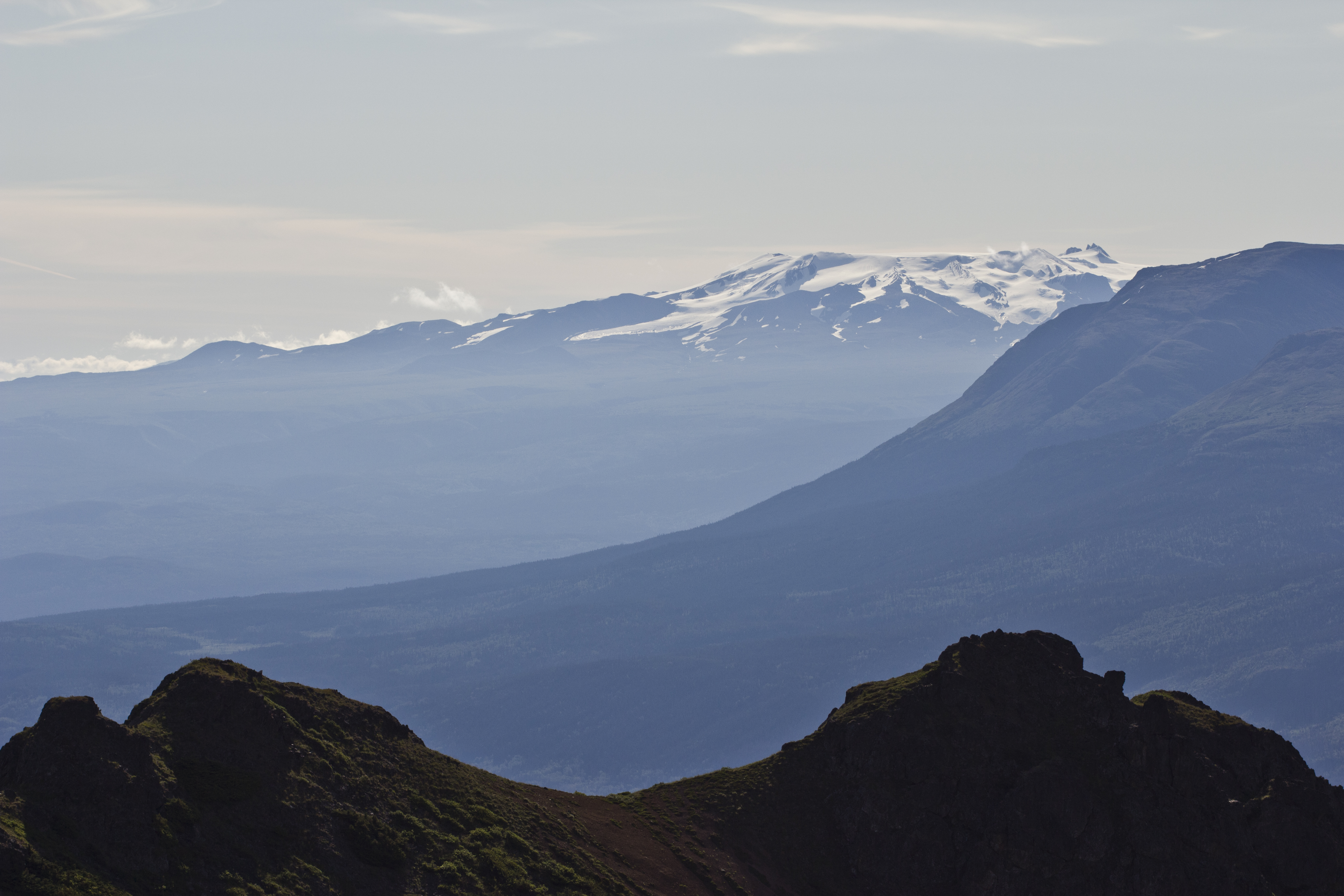
Mount Edziza from the northwest

The Tenchen cirque headwall exposes dikes, sills and breccias within the central conduit that have been intensely altered by hydrothermal solutions, resulting in the rocks being bright yellow and ochre-weathered. Complete alteration occurs in the middle of the altered zone where rock has been reconstituted to a pure white, amorphous material; the only original mineral present is alkali feldspar which comprises small tabular phenocrysts.

Permeating the completely altered material are chalcedony veinlets less than 1 millimetre (0.039 inches) thick which are cut by more extensively distributed veins 1 to 5 centimetres (0.39 to 1.97 inches) wide. Tiny cubes of pyrite occupy many of the larger veins while the surrounding wall rock contains disseminated pyrite and marcasite. The conduit breccia and surrounding rocks were likely altered by intense fumarolic activity that occurred on a prolonged basis.

==== Subfeatures ====
At least three trachyte domes of the Edziza Formation occur on Mount Edziza, all of which were created by the rapid effusion of viscous trachytic lava. The nearly circular Nanook Dome forms the southeastern buttress of the summit crater and is the largest of the three lava domes with a diameter of about three-quarters of a kilometre. It may have been the source for the two upper lava lakes inside the summit crater as they consist of trachyte similar to that of Nanook Dome. Glacier Dome and Triangle Dome are two elliptical masses of trachyte with concentric flow layering on the northwestern and western flanks of Mount Edziza, respectively. Triangle Dome displays a pattern of columnar cooling joints that indicates it was formed by volcanic activity in a subglacial environment. A 24 m (79 ft) thick trachyte flow that may have issued during an early, fluid phase of the Glacier Dome eruption is exposed for 2 km (1.2 mi) north of Pyramid Creek; its distal end thins to about 15 m (49 ft).

South of Pillow Ridge on the northwestern flank of Mount Edziza is a rounded pyroclastic cone with a small central crater that probably formed during the latter stages of Edziza Formation volcanism. This pile of agglutinated trachyte spatter, pumice and bombs was the source of at least two separate lobes of lava that flowed onto the adjacent plateau surface. The northwesterly lobe partially encircles Tsekone Ridge and borders as well as overlies breccia of Pillow Ridge. Extending west of the pyroclastic cone is the second lobe of lava which, together with the northwesterly lobe, is largely overlain by volcanic ash and colluvial material.

== See also ==
- Geology of British Columbia
