= The Pyramid (British Columbia) =

Mountain in British Columbia, Canada

- Pyramid Dome; Pyramid Mountain
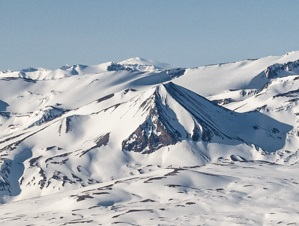
- The Pyramid from the northeast

Highest point
- Elevation: 2,199 m (7,215 ft)
- Coordinates: 57°45′45″N 130°33′51″W

Naming
- Defining authority: BC Geographical Names office in Victoria, British Columbia

Geography
- Location in British Columbia
- Location in Mount Edziza Provincial Park
- Country: Canada
- Province: British Columbia
- District: Cassiar Land District
- Protected area: Mount Edziza Provincial Park
- Parent range: Tahltan Highland
- Topo map: NTS 104G15 Buckley Lake

Geology
- Formed by: Volcanism
- Mountain type: Lava dome
- Rock type: Trachyte
- Last eruption: Pleistocene age

The Pyramid, sometimes referred to as Pyramid Dome or Pyramid Mountain, is a prominent conical peak in Cassiar Land District of northwestern British Columbia, Canada. It has an elevation of 2,199 metres (7,215 feet) and lies on the northeastern flank of Mount Edziza. The peak is southeast of the community of Telegraph Creek in Mount Edziza Provincial Park, which is one of the largest provincial parks in British Columbia. About 366 m (1,201 ft) high and slightly more than 1 kilometre (0.62 miles) wide at its base, The Pyramid gets its name from its resemblance to a pyramid. It rises above its surroundings on a gently sloping interfluve and is partially surrounded by a number of small streams. Among these streams are Cook Creek to the south and so-named Pyramid Creek to the north.

This pyramidal peak is part of the Mount Edziza volcanic complex, which consists of diverse landforms such as shield volcanoes, stratovolcanoes, lava domes and cinder cones. The Pyramid is one of three lava domes defined as part of the Pyramid Formation. It consists mainly of trachyte that was erupted in a semi-molten state. Although The Pyramid has not been greatly modified by erosion, fragments of the dome occur in gravel deposits on the north side of Pyramid Creek and in Cook Creek valley. Surrounding The Pyramid are a number of other volcanic features, including Williams Cone and Sphinx Dome.

== Name and etymology ==
The Pyramid was officially named on January 2, 1980. It was adopted on National Topographic System map 104G/15 after being submitted to the BC Geographical Names office by the Geological Survey of Canada. The Pyramid is named after its resemblance to a pyramid; such peaks are called pyramidal peaks. Several features adjacent to The Pyramid also have names that were adopted simultaneously on 104G/15 for geology reporting purposes; this includes Tsekone Ridge and the Eve, Sidas and Williams cones. In a 2015 Journal of Archaeological Science article, Rudy Reimer of Simon Fraser University referred to The Pyramid as Pyramid Mountain. The Pyramid is called Pyramid Dome in the Catalogue of Canadian volcanoes, an online database provided by Natural Resources Canada.

== Geography ==
The Pyramid is located in Cassiar Land District of northwestern British Columbia, Canada, about 20 km (12 mi) southeast of Buckley Lake on the northeastern flank of Mount Edziza. It has an elevation of 2,199 m (7,215 ft) and is one of several lava domes on the summit and flanks of Mount Edziza; others include the Glacier, Sphinx, Nanook and Triangle domes. The Pyramid is a part of the Mount Edziza volcanic complex, which consists of a group of overlapping shield volcanoes, stratovolcanoes, lava domes and cinder cones that have formed over the last 7.5 million years. Neighbouring features of this volcanic complex include Williams Cone about 3 km (1.9 mi) to the northwest and Sphinx Dome immediately to the southwest.

As a part of the Mount Edziza volcanic complex, The Pyramid lies within the Stikine River watershed. The southern base of The Pyramid is bordered by Cook Creek, a tributary of Tenchen Creek which flows into the adjacent Kakiddi Creek. Flowing around its northern base is Pyramid Creek, which flows into Kakiddi Creek, a tributary of the Klastline River. Between the Cook and Pyramid creeks is a gently sloping interfluve where The Pyramid rises prominently above its surroundings. The dome is about 366 m (1,201 ft) high, slightly more than 1 km (0.62 mi) wide at its base and conical in structure.

The Pyramid lies in Mount Edziza Provincial Park southeast of the community of Telegraph Creek. With an area of 2,661.8 km^{2} (1,027.7 mi^{2}), Mount Edziza Provincial Park is one of the largest provincial parks in British Columbia and was established in 1972 to preserve the volcanic landscape. It includes not only the Mount Edziza area but also the Spectrum Range to the south, which are separated by Raspberry Pass. Mount Edziza Provincial Park is in the Tahltan Highland, a southeast-trending upland area extending along the western side of the Stikine Plateau.

== Geology ==
The Pyramid consists of coarsely porphyritic trachyte of the Pyramid Formation, one of many stratigraphic units comprising the Mount Edziza volcanic complex. Alkali feldspar phenocrysts 0.5–2 centimetres (0.20–0.79 inches) wide account for up to 50% of the trachyte and are embedded in a white, aphanitic matrix that is dotted with extremely small specks of opaque oxides. The growth of The Pyramid was accompanied by scaling which resulted in slabs spalling off the steaming surface of the growing dome to form a peripheral apron of brown, oxidized debris. A thick apron of active talus completely isolates The Pyramid from neighbouring rocks.

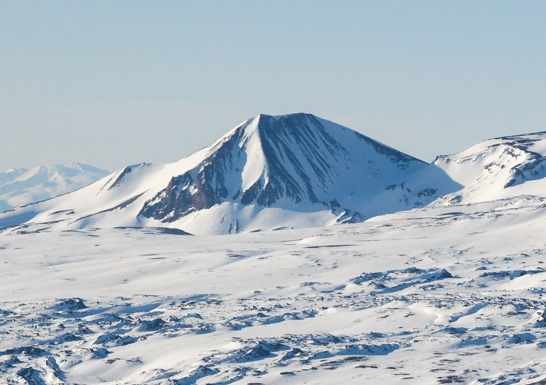
The Pyramid from the north

The formation of The Pyramid took place during the Pyramid eruptive period of the Mount Edziza volcanic complex 1.1 million years ago. Its eruption probably originated from the same vent that erupted older pyroclastic surge deposits of the Pyramid Formation. Up to 40% of the lava erupted from The Pyramid was in the form of solid feldspar crystals, such that no lava flows advanced beyond the edge of the dome due to their high viscosity. The Pyramid has not erupted since the Pleistocene epoch, neither have the younger Sphinx and Pharaoh domes which are also part of the Pyramid Formation.

Although The Pyramid has not been greatly modified by erosion, clasts derived from its thick apron of active talus occur under trachyte of the Edziza Formation and between basalts of the Nido and Ice Peak formations. Clasts beneath the Edziza Formation are present in thick gravel deposits on the north side of Pyramid Creek whereas clasts between the Nido and Ice Peak formations occur in gravel lenses in Cook Creek valley. Underlying the base of Sphinx Dome at the head of Pyramid Creek are subrounded clasts also derived from The Pyramid.

Edziza obsidian occurs at two outcrops on The Pyramid and are the only known occurrences of obsidian in the Pyramid Formation. The outcrops are in the form of two lava flows referred to as Pyramid High and Pyramid Low; Pyramid High was a source of obsidian for indigenous peoples during the pre-contact era. As many as 136 artifacts made of Pyramid High obsidian have been found in five archaeological sites outside of Tahltan territory, making it the most commonly identified Edziza obsidian. However, no artifacts made of Pyramid High obsidian have been recovered from archaeological sites within Tahltan territory, suggesting that the local Tahltan people either ignored or did not have control over who could access the Pyramid High source.

== See also ==
- List of Northern Cordilleran volcanoes
- List of volcanoes in Canada
- List of lava domes
