= Nanook Dome =

Dome in British Columbia, Canada

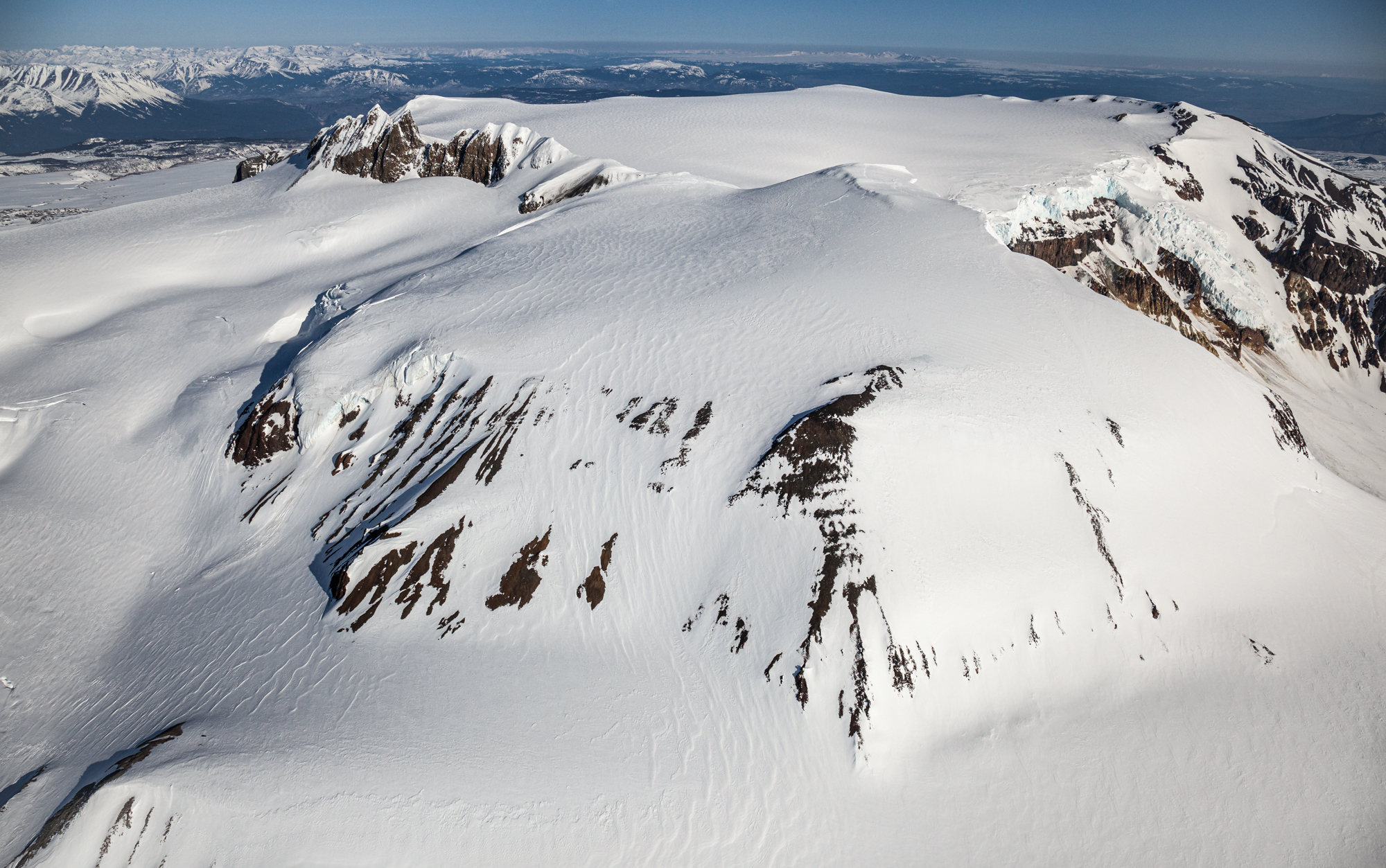
- Nanook Dome with the ice-filled summit crater of Mount Edziza in the background

Highest point
- Elevation: 2,710 m (8,890 ft)
- Coordinates: 57°43′02″N 130°37′05″W

Naming
- Etymology: 'Chief' in Tlingit
- Defining authority: BC Geographical Names office in Victoria, British Columbia

Geography
- Location in British Columbia
- Location in Mount Edziza Provincial Park
- Country: Canada
- Province: British Columbia
- District: Cassiar Land District
- Protected area: Mount Edziza Provincial Park
- Topo map: NTS 104G10 Mount Edziza

Geology
- Formed by: Volcanism
- Mountain type: Lava dome
- Rock type: Trachyte
- Last eruption: Pleistocene age

Nanook Dome is a rounded mass of rock on the southeastern rim of Mount Edziza's summit crater in northwestern British Columbia, Canada. It has an elevation of 2,710 metres (8,890 feet), slightly lower than the pinnacles on the southern crater rim which represent the highest points of Mount Edziza. The dome is about 750 m (2,460 ft) in diameter, almost circular in structure and contains steep, smooth convex margins that reach heights of 150–200 m (490–660 ft). Its northeastern side is truncated by the headwall of an immense cirque containing Tenchen Glacier, but the current structure of the dome is nevertheless almost identical to its original form.

Nanook Dome is one of three lava domes defined as part of the Edziza Formation, which is one of many geological formations comprising the Mount Edziza volcanic complex. The dome consists mainly of trachyte that erupted as viscous lava from a vent on the southwestern rim of Mount Edziza's summit crater. Some of the lava from this vent flowed into the crater where it ponded to form one or more lava lakes. Nanook Dome may have also been the source of some trachyte lava flows of the Kakiddi Formation, which exist in neighbouring valleys. Volcanism at the dome took place mainly during the Pleistocene, as did other domes of the Edziza Formation.

== Name and etymology ==
Nanook Dome was officially named on January 2, 1980. Its name was adopted on National Topographic System map 104G/10 after being submitted to the BC Geographical Names office by the Geological Survey of Canada. Nanook Dome is named after the hereditary head of a Tahltan family, but the name or title is said to be of Tlingit origin, meaning 'chief'. Several features adjacent to Nanook Dome also have names that were adopted simultaneously on 104G/10 for geology reporting purposes; this includes Ice Peak, Tennena Cone and the Ornostay and Koosick bluffs. BC Geographical Names describes a dome as a "mass of rock or ice with a rounded top, elevated above the surrounding terrain".

== Geography ==
Nanook Dome is located in Cassiar Land District of northwestern British Columbia, Canada, about 23 km (14 mi) southeast of Buckley Lake. It has an elevation of 2,710 m (8,890 ft) and forms the southeastern buttress of Mount Edziza's ice-filled summit crater. The dome is about 750 m (2,460 ft) in diameter and is almost circular in structure, containing steep, smooth convex margins that reach heights of 150–200 m (490–660 ft). The northeastern side of Nanook Dome is truncated by the headwall of an immense cirque containing Tenchen Glacier, but the current structure of the dome is nevertheless almost identical to its original form.

Immediately west of Nanook Dome are several spires on the southern rim of Mount Edziza's summit crater. The highest of these spires attains an elevation of 2,786 m (9,140 ft), making it the highest point of Mount Edziza. Mount Edziza is the highest volcano of the Mount Edziza volcanic complex, which consists of a group of overlapping shield volcanoes, stratovolcanoes, lava domes and cinder cones that have formed over the last 7.5 million years. Nanook Dome is one of several lava domes on the summit and flanks of Mount Edziza; others include The Pyramid and the Glacier, Sphinx and Triangle domes.

Nanook Dome lies in Mount Edziza Provincial Park southeast of the community of Telegraph Creek. With an area of 2,661.8 km^{2} (1,027.7 mi^{2}), Mount Edziza Provincial Park is one of the largest provincial parks in British Columbia and was established in 1972 to preserve the volcanic landscape. It includes not only the Mount Edziza area but also the Spectrum Range to the south, which are separated by Raspberry Pass. Mount Edziza Provincial Park is in the Tahltan Highland, a southeast-trending upland area extending along the western side of the Stikine Plateau.

== Geology ==
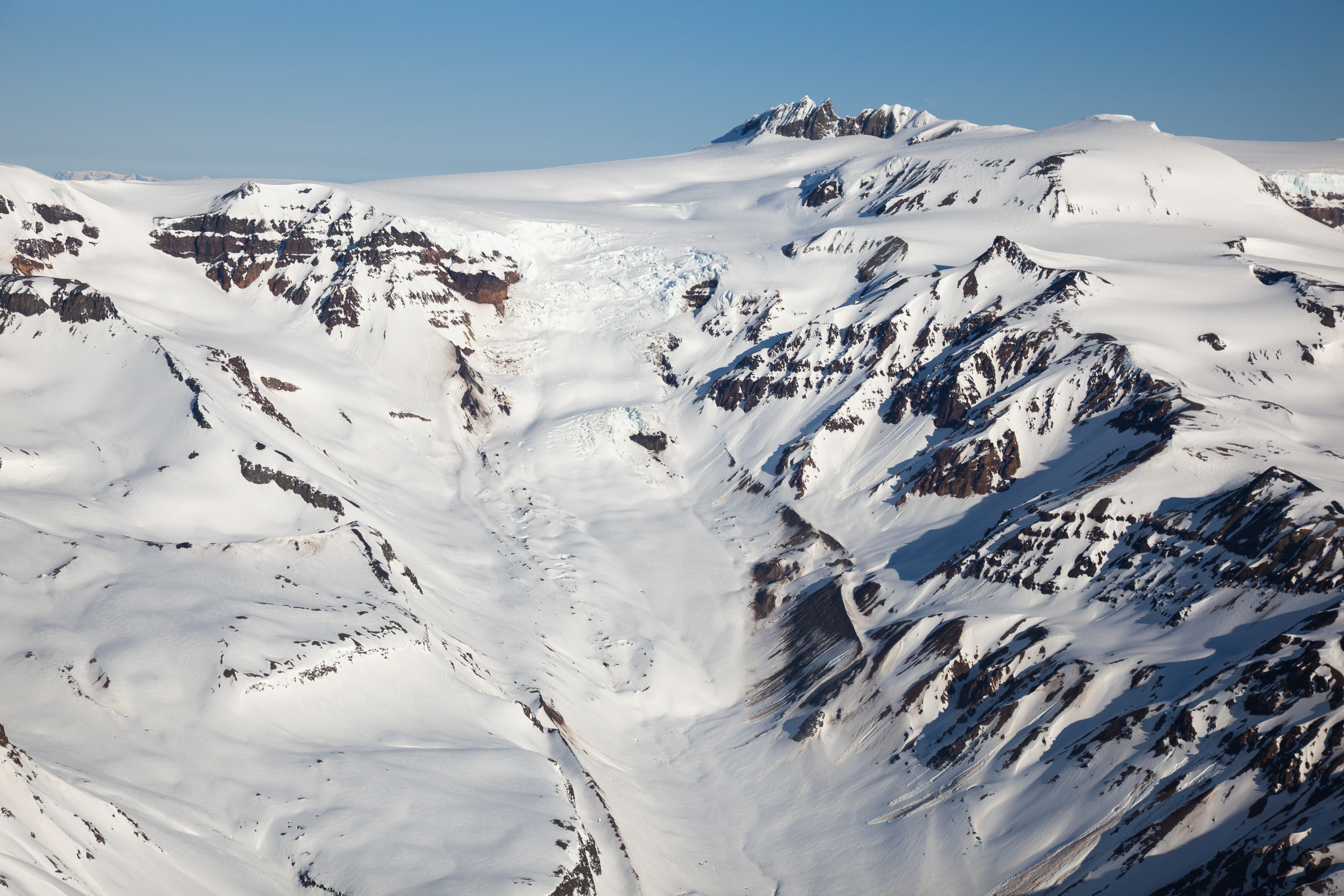
The eastern flank of Mount Edziza with Nanook Dome visible as a bulbous mass in the upper right corner

Nanook Dome is the largest of three lava domes defined as part of the Edziza Formation, one of many stratigraphic units comprising the Mount Edziza volcanic complex. Its formation began during the later stages of the Edziza eruptive period 0.9 million years ago when viscous trachytic lava issued rapidly from a vent on the southwestern rim of Mount Edziza's summit crater. Accompanying the development of Nanook Dome was the effusion of lava that flowed into the summit crater; the ponding of this lava inside the summit crater resulted in the formation of one or more lava lakes. A fuming vent inside the summit crater was effectively sealed by the lava which was soon followed by a small phreatic explosion after lava had solidified. This explosion destroyed part of the eastern crater rim, providing a new passageway for the venting of volcanic gases. Nanook Dome has not erupted since the Pleistocene epoch, nor have the Glacier and Triangle domes which are also part of the Edziza Formation.

Nanook Dome may have been a major source of the adjacent valley-filling trachyte lava flows of the Kakiddi Formation due to their lithological similarity and close spatial association. Canadian volcanologist Jack Souther supposed in 1992 that the Nanook stage of activity began with the eruption of voluminous, relatively fluid, volatile-rich trachytic lava which may have been followed by collapse of Mount Edziza's summit to form the current ice-filled crater. However, trachyte of the Edziza and Kakiddi formations have yielded significant differences in age; a single potassium–argon date of 0.9 ± 0.3 million years has been obtained from pantelleritic trachyte of the Edziza Formation whereas potassium–argon dates of 0.30 ± 0.02 million years and 0.28 ± 0.2 million years have been obtained from trachyte and pantelleritic trachyte of the Kakiddi Formation, respectively. The Kakiddi Formation may nevertheless be similar in age to the youngest parts of the Edziza Formation.

== See also ==
- List of Northern Cordilleran volcanoes
- List of volcanoes in Canada
- List of lava domes
