= Nido Formation =

Geological formation in British Columbia, Canada

- Stratigraphic range: Neogene; 4.4 Ma
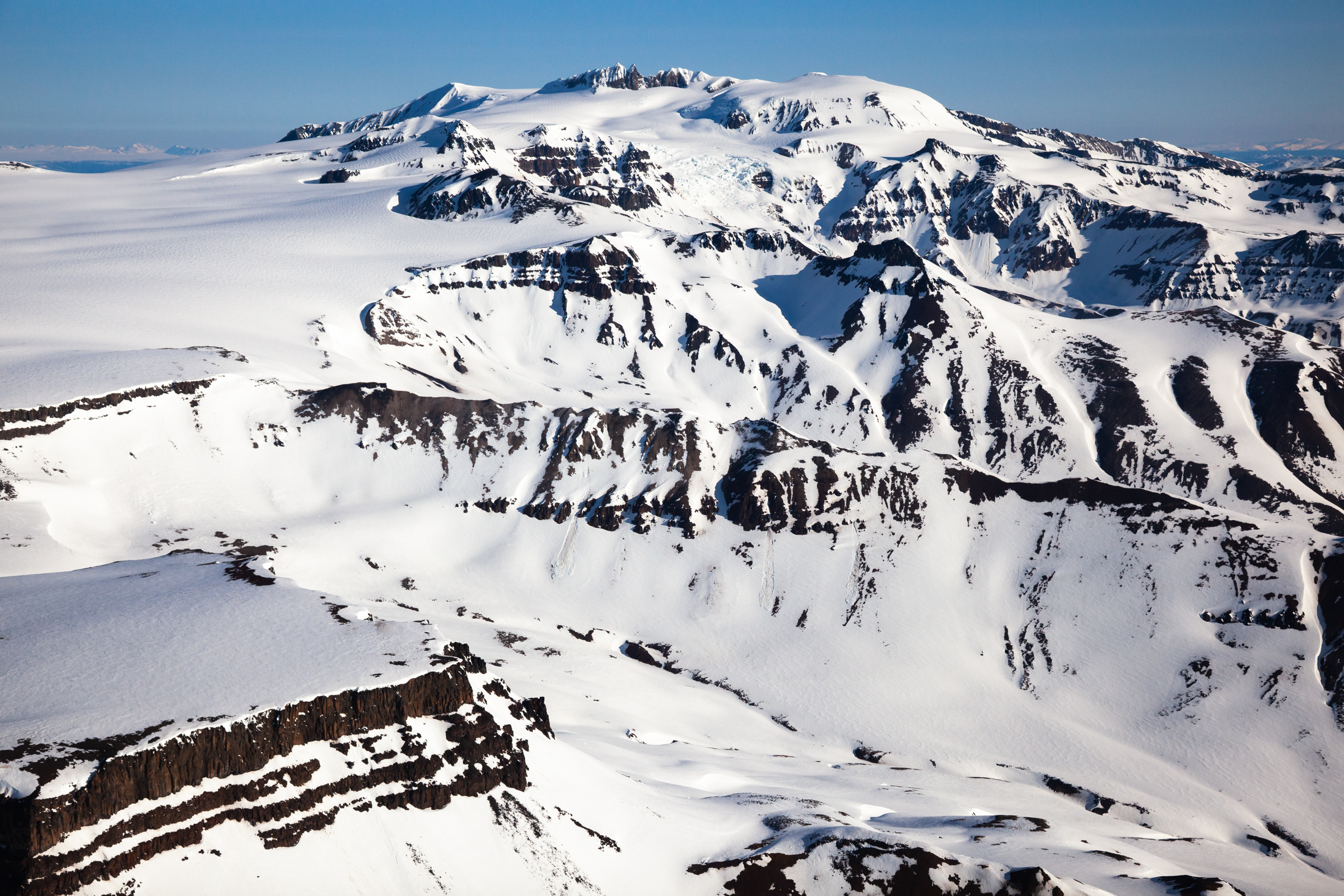
- Kaia Bluff in the lower-left corner consists of alkali basalt of the Nido Formation
- Type: Geological formation
- Unit of: Mount Edziza volcanic complex
- Sub-units: Kounugu Member, Tenchen Member
- Underlies: Spectrum Formation, Arctic Lake Formation, Pyramid Formation, Ice Peak Formation, Edziza Formation, Pillow Ridge Formation, Big Raven Formation, Kakiddi Formation
- Overlies: Raspberry Formation, Armadillo Formation, Little Iskut Formation
- Thickness: Up to 365 m (1,198 ft)

Lithology
- Primary: Alkali basalt
- Other: Hawaiite, picrite

Location
- Coordinates: 57°38′15″N 130°36′10″W (Note: The coordinates are for Kaia Bluff, which consists of alkali basalt of the Nido Formation.)
- Region: British Columbia
- Country: Canada

Type section
- Named for: Nido Creek
- Named by: Souther et al., 1984

The Nido Formation is a stratigraphic unit of Neogene age in northwestern British Columbia, Canada. It is the second most voluminous of 13 geological formations composing the Mount Edziza volcanic complex (MEVC), which consists of volcanic rocks of late Cenozoic age. Underlying the Nido Formation are the Raspberry, Little Iskut and Armadillo formations of the MEVC, which have average ages ranging from 7.4 to 6.3 million years old. The overlying Spectrum, Pyramid, Ice Peak, Pillow Ridge, Edziza, Arctic Lake and Big Raven formations, also part of the MEVC, were deposited in the last 3.5 million years. Radiometric dating of the Nido Formation has yielded ages ranging from 7.8 to 4.4 million years old, but an average age of 4.4 million years has been provided for it.

The Nido Formation is subdivided into two members, each of which is separated by an area of higher terrain. To the north, the Tenchen Member is exposed in valleys cutting the eastern and western sides of the Big Raven Plateau. The Kounugu Member to the south is exposed around the periphery of the Spectrum Range at the southern end of the MEVC. Both members consist mainly of alkali basalt; hawaiite and picrite occur locally at higher elevations. These volcanic rocks were deposited by at least six major and several smaller eruptive centres that were active during the second magmatic cycle of the MEVC. The eruptive centres, which are considered to have been shield volcanoes, have since been deeply eroded.

== History and etymology ==
The Nido Formation was first defined by Jack Souther, Richard Lee Armstrong and J. Harakal in 1984 who grouped it together with the Kounugu Formation in their descriptions and mapping. It was mapped as one of 15 geological formations of the Mount Edziza volcanic complex (MEVC), a group of late Cenozoic volcanic rocks in northwestern British Columbia, Canada. In 1988, Jack Souther remapped the MEVC into 13 geological formations; the Kounugu and Sheep Track formations were reassigned as members of the Nido and Big Raven formations, respectively. The Kounugu and Sheep Track members are no longer recognized as formations since that rank for them has been abandoned.

The Nido Formation is named after Nido Creek, whose name was adopted 2 January 1980 on the National Topographic System map 104G/9 after having been submitted by the Geological Survey of Canada. Nido means 'white man' in the Tahltan language. It is a reference to white men who staked mineral claims in the area of the creek before Mount Edziza Provincial Park was established in 1972.

== Stratigraphy ==
Stratigraphically, the Nido Formation is subdivided into two units referred to as the Kounugu and Tenchen members. They are separated by the Armadillo Highlands and are not completely underlain by a single marker horizon. South of the Armadillo Highlands, the Kounugu Member is exposed around the periphery of the Spectrum Range at the southern end of the MEVC. The Tenchen Member north of the Armadillo Highlands is exposed in steep-walled valleys cutting the eastern and western sides of the Big Raven Plateau at the northern end of the MEVC.

The Nido Formation has a volume of 127 cubic kilometres (30 cubic miles), making it the second most voluminous of the MEVC after the Armadillo Formation. It is also one of five geological formations of the volcanic complex that contains more than 70 km^{3} (17 mi^{3}) of volcanic material. The Nido Formation is the most widespread geological formation of the MEVC over an area about 20 km (12 mi) wide and 50 km (31 mi) long. It contains at least 40 lava flow units and reaches a thickness of 365 metres (1,198 feet) in the Kounugu Member.

=== Overlying units ===
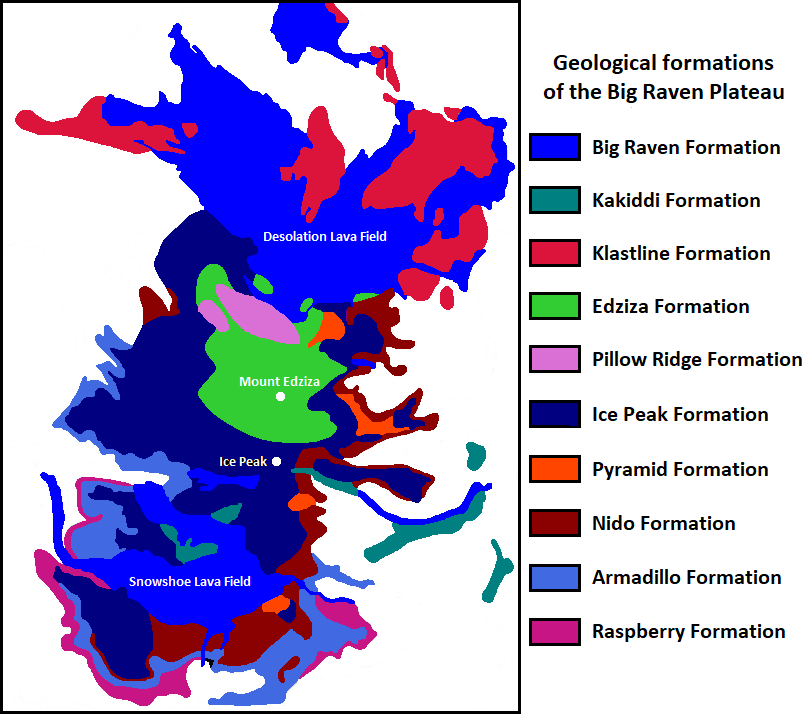
A geological map of the Big Raven Plateau north of the Armadillo Highlands

The Nido Formation is overlain by seven younger geological formations of the MEVC. The oldest is the 3.1-million-year-old Spectrum Formation, which consists mainly of rhyolite and trachyte forming the Spectrum Range. To the north, the Nido Formation is overlain by the 1.1-million-year-old Pyramid Formation on ridges along the deeply dissected eastern flank of Mount Edziza. It consists mainly of rhyolite and trachyte, although basalt overlies a pyroclastic surge deposit at the base of the formation. The approximately 1-million-year-old Ice Peak Formation overlies much of the Nido Formation on the Big Raven Plateau. Consisting of alkali basalt, hawaiite, mugearite, trachyte and benmoreite, it is the most petrographically complex formation of the MEVC.

In the middle of the Big Raven Plateau, the Nido Formation is overlain by the 0.9-million-year-old Pillow Ridge and Edziza formations. The Pillow Ridge Formation is limited to the Pillow and Tsekone ridges, which consist of alkali basalt and hawaiite, respectively. In contrast, the dominantly trachytic Edziza Formation forms the central stratovolcano of Mount Edziza. The 0.71-million-year-old Arctic Lake Formation overlies the Nido Formation on the Arctic Lake Plateau at the southern end of the MEVC. It consists mainly of alkali basalt that issued from at least seven separate eruptive centres on or adjacent to the plateau. Exposures of the 0.3-million-year-old trachytic Kakiddi Formation occur on the eastern and southwestern flanks of Ice Peak. The less than 20,000-year-old Big Raven Formation overlies Nido strata composing the Big Raven and Kitsu plateaus. It consists mainly of alkali basalt and hawaiite, although it also includes a small volume of comenditic trachyte pumice on the Big Raven Plateau.

=== Underlying units ===
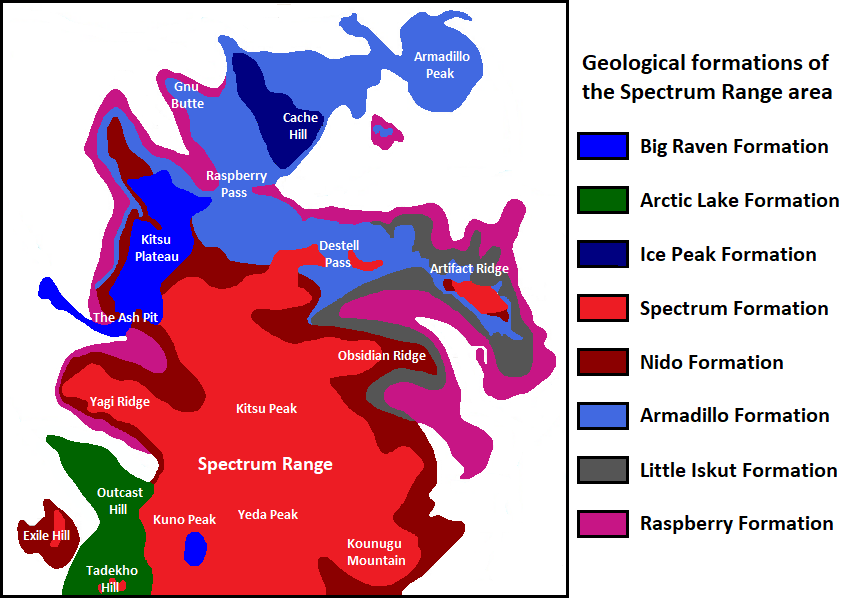
The extent of the Nido Formation south of the Armadillo Highlands

Underlying the Nido Formation are three other geological formations of the MEVC. Basalt, comendite and trachyte of the 6.3-million-year-old Armadillo Formation are exposed under the Nido Formation in strata of the Big Raven and Kitsu plateaus. Because only the distal portions of the Kounugu Member overlap with the southern edge of the Armadillo Formation, it is possible that both stratigraphic units are coeval in age. However, it also does not rule out the possibility that the Kounugu Member is older than the Armadillo Formation. Trachybasalt of the 7.2-million-year-old Little Iskut Formation underlies the Nido Formation in strata of the Artifact and Obsidian ridges south of the Armadillo Highlands. Also exposed under the Nido Formation in strata of the Big Raven and Kitsu plateaus is basalt of the 7.4-million-year-old Raspberry Formation.

In the canyon of Elwyn Creek at the northwestern end of the Big Raven Plateau, the Nido Formation is underlain by leucogranite of the Elwyn Creek Pluton. This 5 km (3.1 mi) wide pluton is of Eocene age and is part of the Sloko Group, which formed in a continental arc setting as early as the Late Cretaceous. Peripheral to the Elwyn Creek Pluton is gently tilted sedimentary strata of the Sustut Group. This geological group consists of siltstone, sandstone, shale, arkose, conglomerate and minor coal that was deposited during the Cretaceous and Paleocene. The formation is also underlain by Paleozoic and Mesozoic sedimentary, volcanic or metamorphic rocks of the Stikinia terrane, which accreted to the continental margin of North America during the Jurassic.

== Volcanology ==
The Nido Formation was deposited by at least six major and several smaller eruptive centres during the second magmatic cycle of the MEVC between 6 and 1 million years ago. Individual eruptive centres are widely separated and formed along the eastern edge of the volcanic complex, mainly in a north–south trending zone. All of them are the products of a long period of volcanic activity and are now deeply eroded; the remains are considered to be of shield volcanoes. The precise sequence of eruptions that formed the Nido Formation remains unknown. However, the geological record suggests that Nido volcanism was characterized by the eruption of highly mobile, fluid lava flows. The lava flowed over lag gravels and outwash from the Armadillo Highlands and created several lava-dammed lakes where the drainage patterns of streams were disrupted. Glacial deposits under the Kounugu and Tenchen members contain clasts from the Armadillo Highlands, suggesting that both units formed more or less simultaneously.

As a part of the MEVC, the Nido Formation lies within a broad area of volcanoes called the Northern Cordilleran Volcanic Province, which extends from northwestern British Columbia northwards through Yukon into easternmost Alaska. The dominant rocks that make up these volcanoes are alkali basalts and hawaiites, but nephelinites, basanites and peralkaline (Note: Peralkaline rocks are magmatic rocks that have a higher ratio of sodium and potassium to aluminum.) phonolites, trachytes and comendites are locally abundant. These rocks were deposited by volcanic eruptions from 20 million years ago to as recently as a few hundred years ago. Volcanism in the Northern Cordilleran Volcanic Province is thought to be due to rifting of the North American Cordillera, driven by changes in relative plate motion between the North American and Pacific plates.

=== Tenchen Member ===
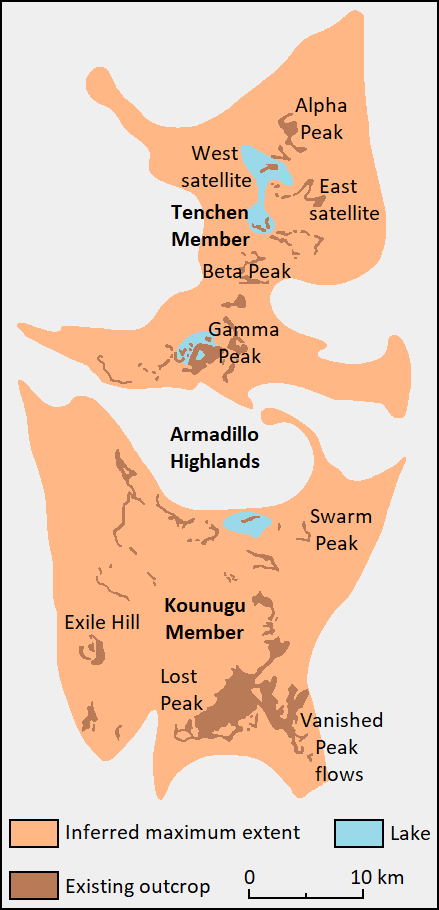
Paleogeological map of the Nido Formation at the end of the Nido eruptive period

At least three major eruptive centres of the Tenchen Member, referred to as the Alpha, Beta and Gamma peaks, flooded an area of more than 350 km^{2} (140 mi^{2}) with lava flows to create a lava field. The northernmost and oldest major eruptive centre, Alpha Peak, is considered to have been adjacent to The Pyramid of the younger Pyramid Formation; this is partially due to the distribution of Nido tephra in that area. Cliffs containing 50 to 60% coarse tephra occur along the southern side of Pyramid Creek, but the actual vent and conduit system of this eruptive centre remains unexposed. Bright red spindle and cow pie bombs up to 0.6 m (2.0 ft) wide occur in the tephra. Lava flows interlayered in the tephra contain rough hackly surfaces and are randomly jointed and highly vesicular. The Alpha shield was at times nearly surrounded by northward-flowing outlet glaciers of an ice cap that covered the Armadillo Highlands.

About 12 km (7.5 mi) to the south, Beta Peak began to form during the late stages of Alpha volcanism when several vents issued thin, coalescing lava flows. Remnants of this small shield volcano are exposed on the eastern flank of Mount Edziza between the Tenchen and Sorcery creeks where flat-lying, columnar-jointed lava flows form prominent step-like outcrops. Lava flows of the Beta shield on Sorcery Ridge are overlain by tephra believed to be the remains of a pyroclastic cone. It consists of lava bombs and volcanic blocks that are enclosed by loosely agglutinated spatter and lapilli. At its climax, the pyroclastic cone rose at least 365 m (1,198 ft) above the surrounding surface of the Beta shield.

Gamma Peak, the southernmost and second oldest major eruptive centre, began to form with the eruption of thin lava flows from a vent at the western end of Cartoona Ridge. These lava flows overlie ash of the Armadillo Formation and travelled along the northern side of the Armadillo Highlands as far west as the Mess Creek Escarpment where they are exposed. Later, the northward-flowing outlet glaciers originating from the Armadillo Highlands eventually covered the Gamma shield. Subglacial volcanism under these glaciers formed a meltwater lake above the Gamma shield, whose surface was penetrated by explosions resulting from lava-water interactions. After the ice had receded, a fragile pile of tuff breccia formed by the earlier subaqueous activity was buried under subaerial lava up to 90 m (300 ft) thick from renewed eruptions. Thin lava flows more than 6.5 km (4.0 mi) long spread to the west. Eroded remnants of the Gamma shield include Kaia Bluff and Cartoona Peak.

=== Kounugu Member ===
The Kounugu Member issued from at least four eruptive centres, all of which have been deeply eroded or extensively buried under younger rocks. Swarm Peak formed on the older Little Iskut Formation shield volcano as magma intruded through swarms of north-trending fractures in the underlying basement. Lava from Swarm Peak flowed over gravel bars and alluvial fans just south of the Armadillo Highlands after descending the southern and western slopes of the Little Iskut shield. Exposed in cliffs along Raspberry Pass, the Little Iskut River and the Artifact and Mess creeks are lava flows believed to have originated from Swarm Peak. Nearly all of the southern edge of the Swarm Peak edifice is buried under lava flows and domes of the younger Spectrum Range.

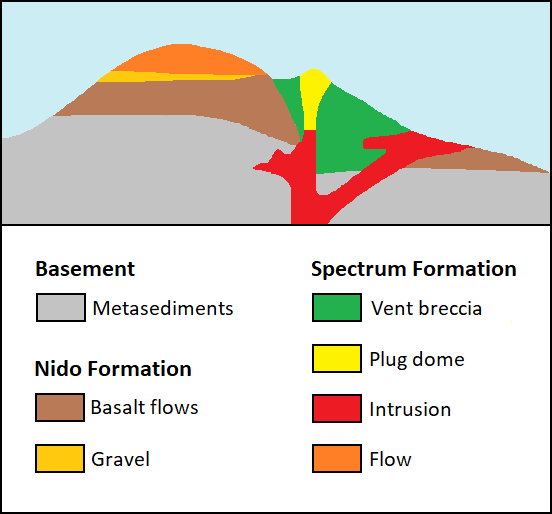
Geological cross section of Exile Hill

Most of the lava flows from the Vanished Peak eruptive centre travelled to the north and west. They are exposed adjacent to the southeastern margin of the Spectrum Range where they reach thicknesses of up to 365 m (1,198 ft). Lava flows ranging from 6-to-15 m (20-to-49 ft) thick form prominent cliffs at the base of the Spectrum Range where they contain well-formed columnar joints. Interbedding these lava flows are 0.5-to-1.5 m-thick (1.6-to-4.9 ft) layers of scoria, which is in the form of cinders and blocks. Vanished Peak was most likely active during a period of glacial recession because there is a lack of evidence for lava-water interaction. About 12 m (39 ft) of pillow lava and palagonite tuff breccia at the extreme southeastern base of the volcanic pile is the only evidence for lava having interacted with water. Jack Souther proposed that the pillow lava and palagonite tuff breccia formed when lava entered a lake.

Lost Peak is a subaerial and subaqueous dome of pyroclastic rocks near the Spectrum Range that rises to a prominent pyramid-shaped cone. The western flank consists of a more than 300 m (980 ft) thick sequence of waterlain tuff breccia, pillow lava and quenched lava toes. These volcanic deposits probably formed when lava ponded against a thick lobe of glacial ice that advanced from the Coast Mountains onto the surrounding plateau. In contrast, the volcanic deposits forming the eastern flank do not show evidence of having interacted with water. They consist mainly of thin lava flows that are interbedded with layers of thick scoria. Underlying the Lost Peak rocks are lava flows that issued from the Vanished Peak eruptive centre, as well as a thick layer of coarse gravel that was deposited by streams.

Exile Hill is the remains of a small pyroclastic cone that formed at the northern end of the Arctic Lake Plateau. It was almost completely inundated by younger lava flows from the south and east, but thick deposits of bombs and agglutinated spatter are exposed on the southeastern flank. A series of lava flows up to 180 m (590 ft) thick, believed to have originated from a vent adjacent to Exile Hill, are exposed in isolated buttes and in cliffs along the upper Mess Creek valley. The lowermost lava flow forming the base of Exile Hill is more than 30 m (98 ft) thick whereas the uppermost rubbly lava flows are only a few metres in thickness. Characterizing the lowermost lava flows are long, curving columns that occur in sheath-like clusters. In contrast, the upper lava flows contain random, blocky columnar jointing or stout, spheroidally weathered columns. These lava flows are overlain by a thick layer of gravel that consists mainly of pebbles and cobblestones. Overlying the gravel is a roughly 100 m (330 ft) thick series of Spectrum Formation flows capping the summit of Exile Hill.

== Lithology ==
Depiction of the total alkali-silica diagram with field outlines and labels. Alkali basalt is generally located in region B whereas hawaiite and picrite are located in regions S1 and Pc, respectively.

The Nido Formation resembles the Raspberry Formation both mineralogically and geomorphologically. It is remarkably uniform in composition despite having been issued from several separate eruptive centres over a long period. Alkali basalt is the most widely distributed volcanic rock, occurring in both the Tenchen and Kounugu members. Its lithology ranges from aphyric to slightly phyric; phenocrysts consist of feldspar and pyroxene. Alkali basalt predominates the lower portions of the Nido Formation and exhibits a great variety of depositional forms. These include subaerial lava flows and subaqueous pillow lava, sideromelane tuff breccia and ice-contact facies.

Picrite and hawaiite occur locally in the uppermost part of the Nido Formation and represent minor porphyritic phases of Nido volcanism. Both rocks are also present in the Tenchen and Kounugu members, the latter of which contains phenocrysts of feldspar. The presence of hawaitte suggests that some alkali basalt underwent partial crystal fractionation and feldspar accumulation in subterranean magma chambers prior to eruption. Picrite is limited to the Vanished Peak and Gamma Peak eruptive centres where it forms lava flows in the upper parts of both edifices.

Essential mineral constituents in the Nido Formation include salite, olivine, plagioclase and ilmenite. Phenocrysts composed of plagioclase are the most common; they are normally in the form of 2-to-5-millimetre-long (0.079-to-0.197-inch) tabular laths. The laths are usually euhedral and complexly twinned, rarely making up more than 5% of Nido alkali basalt. Hawaiite containing up to 50% plagioclase phenocrysts forms the upper lava flows of the Beta Peak eruptive centre. Olivine and clinopyroxene phenocrysts are the second and third most common phenocrysts, respectively. Phenocrysts composed of opaque oxides are rare.

== Age ==
At least four potassium–argon dates have been obtained from samples of the Nido Formation. The two youngest dates, 4.4 ± 0.5 million years and 4.5 ± 0.3 million years, are from the Tenchen Member. Analytical precision of these two dates gives an average age of 4.4 million years. This age places the Tenchen Member in the Pliocene and has also been used as the average age of the Nido Formation. The third youngest date, 5.5 ± 1.6 million years, is also from the Tenchen Member but it has a large error. As a result, this date may be anomalously old. Rocks with high atmospheric argon content, such as the sample this date was obtained from, are susceptible of producing erroneous ages. The average age of the Tenchen Member increases only to 4.5 million years if the third youngest date is included.

The oldest date of 7.8 ± 0.3 million years is from a thick section of Kounugu Member basalt southeast of the Spectrum Range. If this date is correct, it suggests that the overall age of the Kounugu Member may span those of the Raspberry and Armadillo formations. It also suggests that Nido volcanism began during the Miocene rather than the Pliocene, both of which are epochs of the Neogene period. The location where the oldest date was obtained is beyond the southern extent of the Armadillo Formation where the Kounugu Member overlies Mesozoic or Paleozoic basement.
