= Tsecha Creek =

- Mouth of Tsecha Creek

Location
- Country: Canada
- Province: British Columbia
- District: Cassiar Land District

Physical characteristics
- Source: Mount Edziza
  - location: Big Raven Plateau
  - coordinates: 57°46′00″N 130°37′13″W
  - elevation: 2,093 m (6,867 ft)
- Mouth: Kakiddi Creek
  - location: Stikine Plateau
  - coordinates: 57°49′41″N 130°25′55″W
  - elevation: 716 m (2,349 ft)
- Length: 16 km (9.9 mi)
- Basin size: 23.1 km^{2} (8.9 sq mi)
- Discharge
  - average: 0.423 m^{3}/s (14.9 cu ft/s)

Basin features
- Topo map: NTS 104G15 Buckley Lake; NTS 104G9 Kinaskan Lake

Tsecha Creek is a tributary of Kakiddi Creek, which in turn is a tributary of the Klastline River, part of the Stikine River watershed in northwest part of the province of British Columbia, Canada. It flows generally west for about 16 km (9.9 mi) to join Kakiddi Creek about 5 km (3.1 mi) south of Kakiddi Creek's confluence with the Klastline River. Tsecha Creek's watershed covers 23.1 km^{2} (8.9 sq mi) and its mean annual discharge is estimated at 0.423 m^{3}/s (14.9 cu ft/s). The mouth of Tsecha Creek is located about 44 km (27 mi) east-southeast of Telegraph Creek, about 26 km (16 mi) west of Iskut and about 73 km (45 mi) south-southwest of Dease Lake. Tsecha Creek's watershed's land cover is classified as 47.8% barren, 27.5% conifer forest, 13.1% shrubland, 10.3% snow/glacier, and small amounts of other cover.

Tsecha Creek is in Mount Edziza Provincial Park which lies within the traditional territory of the Tahltan people.

== Geography ==
Tsecha Creek originates from the northern slope of Mount Edziza, a massive glaciated mountain in the middle of the Big Raven Plateau. From its source between Pillow Ridge and The Pyramid, Tsecha Creek flows northwest about 8 km (5.0 mi) to the northwestern edge of the Big Raven Plateau. It then flows about 8 km (5.0 mi) east-northeast down the northwestern side of the plateau into Kakiddi Valley where Tsecha Creek drains into Kakiddi Creek at the northeastern boundary of Mount Edziza Provincial Park.

== Geology ==
The head of Tsecha Creek lies in an area covered by loose black cinders and ash from Williams Cone, the youngest cinder cone in the Desolation Lava Field. This lava field is one of the youngest volcanic features of the Mount Edziza volcanic complex which consists of a linear group of volcanoes on the Tahltan Highland.

== History ==
The name of the creek was chosen by surveyors of the Geological Survey of Canada and was first adopted 2 January 1980 on the National Topographic System map 104G/16. Tsecha is a combination of the Tahltan words "tse" and "cha", which mean "rock" and "rain", respectively. The name is a reference to the loose black cinders and ash at the head of the creek which rained down from an eruption column during the eruption of Williams Cone in 630 CE ± 150 years.

== See also ==
- List of rivers of British Columbia
