= Tennaya Creek =

Tennaya Creek Icefall Creek
- Mouth of Tennaya Creek

Location
- Country: Canada
- Province: British Columbia
- District: Cassiar Land District

Physical characteristics
- Source: Tennaya Glacier
  - location: Mount Edziza
  - coordinates: 57°41′30″N 130°35′38″W
  - elevation: 1,658 m (5,440 ft)
- Mouth: Nuttlude Lake
  - location: Stikine Plateau
  - coordinates: 57°42′05″N 130°26′14″W
  - elevation: 792 m (2,598 ft)
- Length: 16 km (9.9 mi)
- Basin size: 63.3 km^{2} (24.4 sq mi)
- Discharge
  - average: 1.50 m^{3}/s (53 cu ft/s)

Basin features
- Topo map: NTS 104G10 Mount Edziza; NTS 104G9 Kinaskan Lake

Tennaya Creek is a tributary of Kakiddi Creek, which in turn is a tributary of the Klastline River, part of the Stikine River watershed in the northwest part of the province of British Columbia, Canada. It flows generally west for about 16 km (9.9 mi) to join Kakiddi Creek about 19 km (12 mi) south of Kakiddi Creek's confluence with the Klastline River. Tennaya Creek's watershed covers 63.3 km^{2} (24.4 sq mi) and its mean annual discharge is estimated at 1.50 m^{3}/s (53 cu ft/s). The mouth of Tennaya Creek is located about 48 km (30 mi) southeast of Telegraph Creek, about 30 km (19 mi) southwest of Iskut and about 86 km (53 mi) south-southwest of Dease Lake. Tennaya Creek's watershed's land cover is classified as 31.3% barren, 26.0% conifer forest, 17.9% snow/glacier, 12.6% herbaceous, 9.9% shrubland, and small amounts of other cover.

Tennaya Creek is in Mount Edziza Provincial Park and the Tenh Dẕetle Conservancy, both of which lie within the traditional territory of the Tahltan people.

== Geography ==
Tennaya Creek originates from the eastern slope of Mount Edziza, a massive glaciated mountain in the middle of the Big Raven Plateau. From its source, Tennaya Glacier, Tennaya Creek flows about 6 km (3.7 mi) southeast through a vegetated canyon. Tennaya Creek then flows east through the canyon for another 1 km (0.62 mi) before entering Kakiddi Valley where it flows an additional 8 km (5.0 mi) northwest into the southwestern end of Nuttlude Lake, an expansion of Kakiddi Creek.

== Geology ==
At the head of Tennaya Creek are four active cirques exposing the internal structure of Ice Peak, an eroded stratovolcano predating the main edifice of Mount Edziza. Exposed in the steep headwalls of these cirques are thick flows of trachyte and pyroclastic breccia belonging to the Ice Peak Formation. Tennaya Creek has also cut through the base of the volcano, resulting in deep dissection of the underlying basement rocks. A 120 m-thick (390 ft) diabase intrusion is exposed along the northwestern headwall of Tennaya Creek for about 1.5 km (0.93 mi); it is the largest subvolcanic intrusion related to the Ice Peak volcano.

Trachyte flows of the younger Kakiddi Formation occur in the south forks of Tennaya Creek. The source of these lava flows was originally thought to be The Neck, but radiometric dating of this volcanic plug suggests that it formed during the emplacement of the older Ice Peak Formation. They instead probably issued from vents in or adjacent to the valleys containing them. A nearly 1 km (0.62 mi) wide and 60–120 m (200–390 ft) thick trachyte flow of the Kakiddi Formation forms a flat interfluve between the lower reaches of Sorcery and Tennaya creeks. It probably issued from Ice Peak or Nanook Dome on the southeastern rim of Mount Edziza.

Two small volcanic cones of the Big Raven Formation occur in two cirques at the head of Tennaya Creek. Icefall Cone on the northeast spur of Tennaya Cirque is completely buried under glacial ice and moraine. Ridge Cone is largely covered by permanent snow and lies on the western rim of Idiji Cirque. Both cones produced lava flows but are now almost completely covered by talus, moraine, fluvial gravel and glacial ice. Most of the lava from these cones probably cascaded down the steep Tennaya and Idiji cirque headwalls into Tennaya Creek valley.

The north side of Tennaya Creek contains a zone of mineralization called the West Creek occurrence or West Creek showing. It includes a 1.2 m-wide (3.9 ft) quartz vein carrying pyrite, chalcopyrite and sphalerite. Sampling of this vein in 2016 returned values in gold, silver and copper.

== History ==
The field name for Tennaya Creek was Icefall Creek, so-named because a spectacular icefall was observed at the head of Tennaya Creek valley. The current name was adopted in 1980 and is a combination of the Tahltan words "ten" and "naya", which mean "ice" and "be come down" respectively. Prior to the creation of the Tenh Dẕetle Conservancy in 2021, Tennaya Creek was located in the Mount Edziza Recreation Area which was disestablished in 2003.

== See also ==
- List of rivers of British Columbia
