= Nido Creek =

Tribuatary river in the country of Canada

- Mouth of Nido Creek

Location
- Country: Canada
- Province: British Columbia
- District: Cassiar Land District

Physical characteristics
- Source: Mount Edziza
  - location: Tahltan Highland
  - coordinates: 57°31′24″N 130°35′51″W
  - elevation: 2,090 m (6,860 ft)
- Mouth: Nuttlude Lake, Kakiddi Creek
  - coordinates: 57°42′49″N 130°27′13″W
  - elevation: 790 m (2,590 ft)
- Length: 11 km (6.8 mi)
- Basin size: 19.2 km^{2} (7.4 sq mi)
- Discharge
  - average: 0.375 m^{3}/s (13.2 cu ft/s)

Basin features
- Topo map: NTS 104G9 Kinaskan Lake

Nido Creek is a tributary of Kakiddi Creek and part of the Stikine River watershed in northwest part of the province of British Columbia, Canada. It flows from Mount Edziza generally east for roughly 11 km (6.8 mi) to empty into Nuttlude Lake, an expansion of Kakiddi Creek, a tributary of the Klastline River, which in turn is a tributary of the Stikine River.

Nido Creek's mean annual discharge is estimated at 0.375 m^{3}/s (13.2 cu ft/s). Its watershed covers 19.2 km^{2} (7.4 sq mi) and is entirely within Mount Edziza Provincial Park and Tenh Dẕetle Conservancy. The watershed's land cover is classified as 33.8% barren, 30.1% conifer forest, 14.8% herbaceous, 13.7% shrubland, 7.3% snow/glacier, and small amounts of other cover.

The mouth of Nido Creek is located about 47 km (29 mi) southeast of Telegraph Creek, British Columbia, about 85 km (53 mi) south of Dease Lake, British Columbia, and about 245 km (152 mi) southeast of Juneau, Alaska.

Nido Creek is in Mount Edziza Provincial Park and the Tenh Dẕetle Conservancy, both of which lie within the traditional territory of the Tahltan First Nation, of the Tahltan people.

The name "Nido" is recorded as being a Tahltan word for "white man". It is the location of a number of mineral claims which were staked before this creek was given provincial park status.

== Geography ==
Nido Creek originates from the many glaciers on the east side of Mount Edziza and Nanook Dome. From its source, Nido Creek flows east for about 11 km (6.8 mi) before emptying into Nuttlude Lake, an expansion of Kakiddi Creek. The mouth of Nido Creek is just north of the mouth of Tennaya Creek. Nido Creek's watershed is within the Mount Edziza volcanic complex.

== See also ==
- List of rivers of British Columbia
