= Kakiddi =

Kakiddi can refer to:

- Kakiddi Creek, a stream in British Columbia, Canada
- Kakiddi Formation, a geological formation in British Columbia, Canada
- Kakiddi Lake, a lake in British Columbia, Canada
