= Sorcery Creek =

Tribuatary river in the country of Canada

- Mouth of Sorcery Creek

Location
- Country: Canada
- Province: British Columbia
- District: Cassiar Land District

Physical characteristics
- Source: Near Mount Edziza
  - location: Tahltan Highland
  - coordinates: 57°38′15″N 130°35′11″W
  - elevation: 1,900 m (6,200 ft)
- Mouth: Kakiddi Lake, Kakiddi Creek
  - coordinates: 57°39′37″N 130°25′1″W
  - elevation: 792 m (2,598 ft)
- Length: 13 km (8.1 mi)
- Basin size: 15.1 km^{2} (5.8 sq mi)
- Discharge
  - average: 0.204 m^{3}/s (7.2 cu ft/s)

Basin features
- Topo map: NTS 104G9 Kinaskan Lake

Sorcery Creek is a tributary of Kakiddi Creek and part of the Stikine River watershed in northwest part of the province of British Columbia, Canada. From high peaks just south of Mount Edziza it flows generally east for roughly 13 km (8.1 mi) to empty into Kakiddi Lake, an expansion of Kakiddi Creek, a tributary of the Klastline River, which in turn is a tributary of the Stikine River.

Sorcery Creek's mean annual discharge is estimated at 0.204 m^{3}/s (7.2 cu ft/s). Its watershed covers 15.1 km^{2} (5.8 sq mi) and is entirely within Mount Edziza Provincial Park and Tenh Dẕetle Conservancy. The watershed's land cover is classified as 55.3% conifer forest, 20.0% barren, 13.2% shrubland, 6.0% herbaceous, 3.7% deciduous forest, 1.3% wetland, and small amounts of other cover.

The mouth of Sorcery Creek is located about 50 km (31 mi) southeast of Telegraph Creek, British Columbia, about 77 km (48 mi) north of Bob Quinn Lake, British Columbia, and about 245 km (152 mi) east of Juneau, Alaska.

Sorcery Creek is in Mount Edziza Provincial Park and the Tenh Dẕetle Conservancy, both of which lie within the traditional territory of the Tahltan First Nation, of the Tahltan people.

== Geography ==
Sorcery Creek originates in the high peaks south of Mount Edziza, such as Kaia Bluff. From its source about 9 km (5.6 mi) south of the summit of Mount Edziza, Sorcery Creek flows east for about 13 km (8.1 mi) before emptying into Kakiddi Lake, an expansion of Kakiddi Creek. Sorcery Creek's watershed is within the Mount Edziza volcanic complex.

== See also ==
- List of rivers of British Columbia
- Sorcery Ridge
