= Mount Edziza Recreation Area =

Recreation area in British Columbia, Canada

- Location within British Columbia
- Location: Cassiar Land District, British Columbia, Canada
- Coordinates: 57°44′59″N 130°50′06″W
- Area: 4,000 ha (15 sq mi)
- Established: 27 July 1972
- Disestablished: 19 March 2003

The Mount Edziza Recreation Area was a recreation area in Cassiar Land District of northwestern British Columbia, Canada, located southeast of the community of Telegraph Creek. It was established on 27 February 1972 along with Mount Edziza Provincial Park. Initially, the 101,171-hectare (249,999-acre) recreation area formed a 1-to-10-kilometre-wide (0.62-to-6.21-mile) buffer zone around much of the provincial park.

About 96,770 hectares (239,100 acres) of the Mount Edziza Recreation Area was annexed into Mount Edziza Provincial Park on 21 March 1989, greatly reducing its size to around 4,000 hectares (9,900 acres). By this time only a small portion of the recreation area was located east of Mount Edziza. On 19 March 2003, the Mount Edziza Recreation Area was disestablished to allow resource development on the Spectrum mineral claims.

== Mineral exploration ==
The Spectrum or Red Dog property consisted of a block of mineral claims that covered quartz, pyrite and chalcopyrite mineralization in fractured sedimentary and volcanic rocks of Late Triassic age in the Mount Edziza Recreation Area. Commodities on the property included copper, gold, lead, silver and zinc. From 1971 to 1973, Imperial Oil conducted geophysical, geological and geochemical surveying, as well as 463 metres (1,519 feet) of drilling in four holes. Geochemical and geological surveys were conducted on the Spectrum property by Consolidated Silver Ridge Mines and Newhawk Mines between 1976 and 1981.

Consolidated Silver Ridge Mines also built an airstrip and carried out 3,232 metres (10,604 feet) of drilling in 28 holes during this time period. Additional work on the Spectrum property by Newhawk Mines during this time period included the construction of an access road and 313 metres (1,027 feet) of underground development on the Hawk vein. Further geochemical and geological surveying was performed by Moongold Resources from 1987 to 1989. Mineral exploration conducted by Columbia Gold Mines from 1990 to 1992 consisted of rock sampling, trenching and 7,066 metres (23,182 feet) of drilling in 50 holes.

== See also ==
- Mount Edziza volcanic complex
- Tenh Dẕetle Conservancy
