= Pyramid Creek (Kakiddi Creek tributary) =

- Mouth of Pyramid Creek

Location
- Country: Canada
- Province: British Columbia
- District: Cassiar Land District

Physical characteristics
- Source: Mount Edziza
  - location: Big Raven Plateau
  - coordinates: 57°46′07″N 130°35′00″W
  - elevation: 1,947 m (6,388 ft)
- Mouth: Kakiddi Creek
  - location: Stikine Plateau
  - coordinates: 57°46′44″N 130°27′10″W
  - elevation: 751 m (2,464 ft)
- Length: 9 km (5.6 mi)
- Basin size: 22.1 km^{2} (8.5 sq mi)
- Discharge
  - average: 0.358 m^{3}/s (12.6 cu ft/s)

Basin features
- Topo map: NTS 104G15 Buckley Lake; NTS 104G16 Klastline River

Pyramid Creek is a tributary of Kakiddi Creek, which in turn is a tributary of the Klastline River, part of the Stikine River watershed in northwest part of the province of British Columbia, Canada. It generally flows east for about 9 km (5.6 mi) to join Kakiddi Creek about 10 km (6.2 mi) south of Kakiddi Creek's confluence with the Klastline River. Pyramid Creek's watershed covers 22.1 km^{2} (8.5 sq mi) and its mean annual discharge is estimated at 0.358 m^{3}/s (12.6 cu ft/s). The mouth of Pyramid Creek is located about 44 km (27 mi) southeast of Telegraph Creek, about 26 km (16 mi) west-southwest of Iskut and about 73 km (45 mi) southwest of Dease Lake. Pyramid Creek's watershed's land cover is classified as 44.6% conifer forest, 24.1% barren, 16% shrubland, 9.8% snow/glacier, 5.3% herbaceous and small amounts of other cover.

== Name and etymology ==
The creek is named after The Pyramid, a lava dome in Mount Edziza Provincial Park near the head of Pyramid Creek. The name of the creek has not been approved by the Geographical Names Board of Canada and does not appear in BC Geographical Names or the Canadian Geographical Names Data Base. It did, however, appear in at least one report and on at least one geological map by Jack Souther, a volcanologist of the Geological Survey of Canada who studied the Mount Edziza volcanic complex in detail until he retired to the position of an emeritus scientist in 1992.

== Course ==
Pyramid Creek originates from an unnamed glacier on the northeastern side of Mount Edziza, a massive glaciated mountain in the middle of the Big Raven Plateau. From its source between Williams Cone and The Pyramid, Pyramid Creek flows east-northeast about 4 km (2.5 mi) through a canyon at the northeastern end of the Big Raven Plateau. It then flows about 6 km (3.7 mi) east-southeast down the northeastern side of the plateau into Kakiddi Valley where Pyramid Creek drains into Kakiddi Creek at the northeastern boundary of Mount Edziza Provincial Park.

== See also ==
- List of rivers of British Columbia
