= Kakiddi Creek =

- Mouth of Kakiddi Creek

Location
- Country: Canada
- Province: British Columbia
- District: Cassiar Land District

Physical characteristics
- Source: Kakiddi Lake
  - location: Stikine Plateau
  - coordinates: 57°37′26″N 130°24′00″W
  - elevation: 789 m (2,589 ft)
- Mouth: Klastline River
  - coordinates: 57°52′26″N 130°25′29″W
  - elevation: 655 m (2,149 ft)
- Length: 35 km (22 mi)
- Basin size: 709 km^{2} (274 sq mi)
- Discharge
  - average: 11.5 m^{3}/s (410 cu ft/s)

Basin features
- Tributaries
  - left: Nido Creek, Pyramid Creek, Sorcery Creek, Tenchen Creek, Tennaya Creek, Tsecha Creek
  - right: Quash Creek
- Topo map: NTS 104G9 Kinaskan Lake; NTS 104G16 Klastline River

Kakiddi Creek is a tributary of the Klastline River in northwest part of the province of British Columbia, Canada. It flows north about 35 km (22 mi) through two lakes in a broad hummocky lowland to join the Klastline River, which in turn is a tributary of the Stikine River. Kakiddi Creek forms the northeastern boundary of Mount Edziza Provincial Park which lies within the traditional territory of the Tahltan people.

Kakiddi Creek's watershed covers 709 km^{2} (274 sq mi) and its estimated mean annual discharge is 11.5 m^{3}/s (410 cu ft/s). The mouth of Kakiddi Creek is located about 25 km (16 mi) west of Iskut, 44 km (27 mi) east of Telegraph Creek and about 77 km (48 mi) south-southwest of Dease Lake. Kakiddi Creek's watershed's land cover is classified as 46.6% conifer forest, 17.4% barren, 15.4% shrubland, 11.2% herbaceous, 5.4% snow/glacier, and small amounts of other cover.

== Geography ==
Kakiddi Creek originates with several small streams flowing into Kakiddi Lake on the northeastern side of the Mount Edziza volcanic complex, a linear group of volcanoes on the Tahltan Highland. From Kakiddi Lake, the creek flows about 3 km (1.9 mi) north into Nuttlude Lake from which it continues north for another 20 km (12 mi) before draining into the Klastline River. Both Kakiddi Lake and Nuttlude Lake lie behind large alluvial fans deposited by east-flowing tributaries. The glacial and landslide debris comprising these alluvial fans originated from the rapidly eroding headwalls and steep spurs on the eastern side of the Mount Edziza volcanic complex.

Kakiddi Creek contains six named left tributaries. The first one is Sorcery Creek which flows east into Kakiddi Lake. Tennaya Creek is the second named left tributary which flows northeast into Nuttlude Lake. The third named left tributary, Nido Creek, also flows northeast into Nuttlude Lake. Tenchen Creek, the fourth named left tributary, flows northeast into Kakiddi Creek. The fifth named left tributary, Pyramid Creek, flows east into Kakiddi Creek. Tsecha Creek is the sixth named left tributary which flows northeast into Kakiddi Creek. The only named right tributary, Quash Creek, flows west into Kakiddi Creek.

Kakiddi Lake and Nuttlude Lake are well populated with rainbow trout and provide fishing in Mount Edziza Provincial Park. Both lakes also provide access to Mount Edziza Provincial Park as they are large enough to be used by float-equipped aircraft.

== Geology ==
Kakiddi Creek is the namesake of the Kakiddi Formation, a geological formation of the Mount Edziza volcanic complex. It consists of thick Pleistocene trachyte lava flows and pyroclastic rocks that extend into Kakiddi Valley. A Holocene lava flow from Moraine Cone on the north slope of Mount Edziza entered Kakiddi Creek near its junction with the Klastline River. In doing so, the lava flow temporarily blocked Kakiddi Creek to form a lava-dammed lake. Subsequent etching of this lava dam by Kakiddi Creek has exposed beds of lacustrine silt upstream from the lava. Moraine Cone and the associated lava flow are assigned to the Big Raven Formation, the youngest geological formation of the Mount Edziza volcanic complex. A Holocene lava flow from the eastern slope of the Mount Edziza volcanic complex extends almost to Nuttlude Lake and is also part of the Big Raven Formation.

== See also ==
- List of rivers of British Columbia
