= Pillow Ridge =

Mountain ridge in Canada

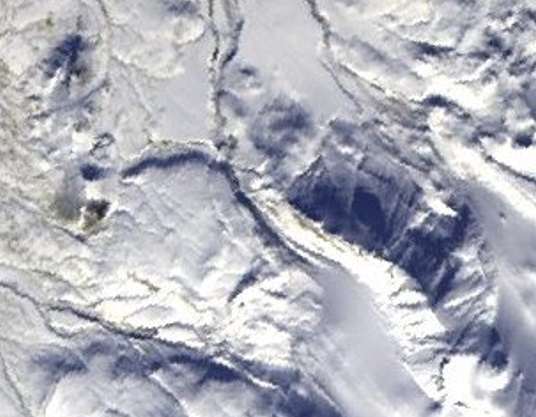
- Pillow Ridge (bottom right) and Tsekone Ridge (upper left)

Highest point
- Elevation: 2,400 m (7,900 ft)
- Coordinates: 57°45′34″N 130°39′6″W

Geography
- Location within British Columbia
- Location: British Columbia, Canada
- District: Cassiar Land District
- Parent range: Tahltan Highland
- Topo map: NTS 104G15 Buckley Lake

Geology
- Rock age: Pleistocene
- Mountain type: Subglacial mound
- Rock type: Pillow Formation alkali basalt
- Volcanic zone: Northern Cordilleran Province
- Last eruption: Pleistocene

Pillow Ridge is a ridge of the Tahltan Highland in northern British Columbia, Canada, located southeast of Telegraph Creek. It extends northwest from Mount Edziza in Mount Edziza Provincial Park.

== History ==
As its name suggests, Pillow Ridge was named on January 2, 1980 by the Geological Survey of Canada for the classic exposures of subaqueous pillow lava that form the ridge.

== Geology ==
Pillow Ridge is a volcanic feature associated with the Mount Edziza volcanic complex which in turn form part of the Northern Cordilleran Volcanic Province. It is a subglacial mound that formed in the Pleistocene period when this area was buried beneath glacial ice during the last glacial period.

== See also ==
- List of volcanoes in Canada
- List of Northern Cordilleran volcanoes
- Volcanism of Canada
- Volcanism of Western Canada
