= Cartoona =

Cartoona can refer to:

- Cartoona Peak, a mountain peak in British Columbia, Canada
- Cartoona Ridge, a mountain ridge in British Columbia, Canada
