= Pyramid Formation (British Columbia) =

Geological formation in British Columbia

- Stratigraphic range: 1.2–0.9 Ma
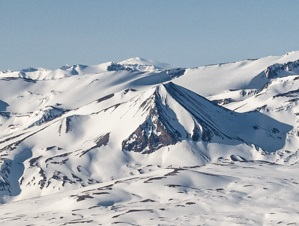
- The Pyramid consists of Pyramid Formation trachyte
- Type: Geological formation
- Unit of: Mount Edziza volcanic complex
- Underlies: Ice Peak Formation, Edziza Formation
- Overlies: Nido Formation

Lithology
- Primary: Trachyte, comendite, pantellerite
- Other: Basalt

Location
- Coordinates: 57.5°N 130.6°W
- Region: British Columbia
- Country: Canada

Type section
- Named for: The Pyramid
- Named by: Souther et al.
- Year defined: 1984
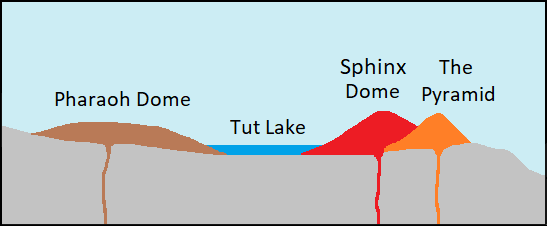
- Cross section showing the maximum extent of the Pyramid Formation at the end of Pyramid time

The Pyramid Formation is a stratigraphic unit of Pleistocene age in northwestern British Columbia, Canada.

== Name ==
The Pyramid Formation takes its name from The Pyramid, a prominent pyramid-shaped lava dome on the northeastern flank of Mount Edziza.

== Geology ==
Two subunits comprise the Pyramid Formation. The lower unit is a basal pyroclastic member up to 3 m (9.8 ft) thick. It contains trachytic pumice, sodic pyroxene and alkali feldspar; the latter two are present in the form of lithic clasts and crystals. This unit is rusty brown in colour and was deposited by a pyroclastic surge. The upper unit consists of a basalt member up to 65 m (213 ft) thick. It includes 6 to 10 individual basalt flows that reach thicknesses of 3–20 m (9.8–65.6 ft). They appear to have been deposited almost immediately after the pyroclastic surge was erupted. Several silicic lava domes and minor lava flows of the Pyramid Formation postdate the basalt member. Among the silicic domes are Sphinx Dome, Pharaoh Dome and The Pyramid.

The Pyramid Formation has a volume of 11.4 km^{3} (2.7 cu mi), making it the eighth most voluminous geological formation of the Mount Edziza volcanic complex after the Little Iskut Formation. It overlies the Nido Formation and underlies the Ice Peak and Edziza formations, all of which have formed in the last 8 million years. K–Ar dating of the Pyramid Formation has yielded ages of 1.2 ± 0.4 million years and 1.20 ± 0.03 million years for comenditic glass and 0.94 ± 0.12 million years and 0.94 ± 0.05 million years for trachyte.

== See also ==
- Volcanism of the Mount Edziza volcanic complex
