= Kakiddi Formation =

Geological formation in British Columbia

- Stratigraphic range: 0.31–0.28 Ma
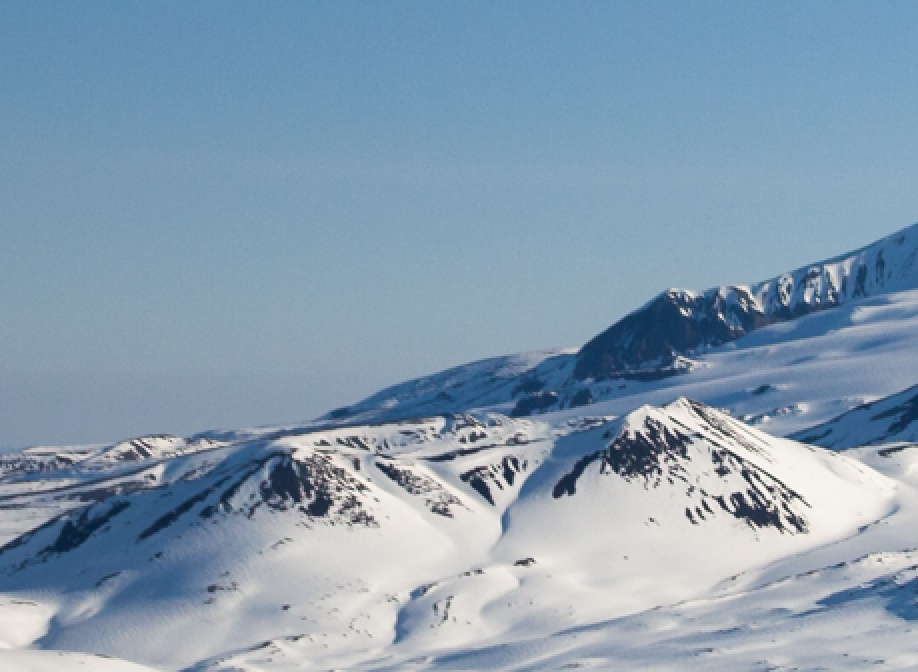
- Punch Cone of the Kakiddi Formation with Triangle Dome of the Edziza Formation in the right background.
- Type: Geological formation
- Unit of: Mount Edziza volcanic complex
- Underlies: Big Raven Formation
- Overlies: Ice Peak Formation, Nido Formation

Lithology
- Primary: Trachyte
- Other: Mugearite

Location
- Coordinates: 57.5°N 130.6°W
- Region: British Columbia
- Country: Canada

Type section
- Named by: Souther et al.
- Year defined: 1984
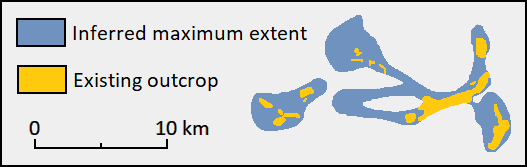
- Paleogeological map showing the inferred maximum extent of the Kakiddi Formation at the end of the Kakiddi eruptive period

The Kakiddi Formation is a stratigraphic unit of Pleistocene age in northwestern British Columbia, Canada.

== Name ==
The Kakiddi Formation is the namesake of Kakiddi Creek, which flows north along the eastern side of the Mount Edziza volcanic complex to the Klastline River. It is also the samesake of Kakiddi Lake where rocks of the Kakiddi Formation are exposed near its western shore.

== Geology ==
The Kakiddi Formation has a volume of 8.3 km^{3} (2.0 cu mi), making it one of the least voluminous of the 13 geological formations comprising the Mount Edziza volcanic complex. It overlies the Ice Peak and Nido formations on the eastern side of Ice Peak and is overlain by the Big Raven Formation at the mouth of Tennaya Creek valley between Nuttlude Lake and Kakiddi Lake.

K–Ar dating of the Kakiddi Formation has yielded ages of 0.31 ± 0.07 million years for mugearite, 0.30 ± 0.02 million years for trachyte, 0.29 ± 0.02 million years for Kakiddi feldspar and 0.28 ± 0.2 million years for pantelleritic trachyte. This suggests that the Kakiddi Formation was deposited by a short-lived period of volcanic activity during the Pleistocene.

== See also ==
- Volcanism of the Mount Edziza volcanic complex
