= Tenh Dẕetle Conservancy =

- Location within British Columbia
- Location: Cassiar Land District, British Columbia, Canada
- Coordinates: 57°41′13″N 130°29′22″W
- Area: 3,528 ha (13.62 sq mi)
- Established: 30 March 2021
- Governing body: BC Parks

The Tenh Dẕetle Conservancy ([tɛn̥ ˈt͡θɛt͡ɬʰə]) is a conservancy located in Cassiar Land District of British Columbia, Canada. It was established as the Mount Edziza Conservancy on 30 March 2021 and then renamed to its current form on 31 January 2022.

== Geography ==
The conservancy is located east of Mount Edziza and northwest of Kakiddi Lake. It covers an area of approximately 3,528 hectares (8,720 acres) along the eastern boundary of Mount Edziza Provincial Park.

== Ecology ==
The Tenh Dẕetle Conservancy protects habitat for a variety of mammal species such as mountain goats, grizzly bears, caribou and moose.

== Etymology ==
Tenh Dẕetle is the Tahltan name for Mount Edziza, meaning Ice Mountain in the Tahltan language.
