= Tsekone Ridge =

Isolated ridge in Canada

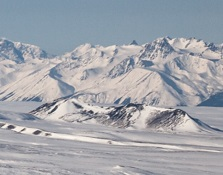
- Tsekone Ridge with the Coast Mountains in the background

Highest point
- Elevation: 1,929 m (6,329 ft)
- Prominence: 114 m (374 ft)
- Coordinates: 57°46′24″N 130°42′08″W

Geography
- Location within British Columbia
- Interactive map of Tsekone Ridge
- Location: British Columbia, Canada
- District: Cassiar Land District
- Parent range: Tahltan Highland
- Topo map: NTS 104G15 Buckley Lake

Geology
- Rock age: Pleistocene
- Mountain type: Subglacial mound
- Last eruption: Pleistocene

Tsekone Ridge, also called Tsekone Peak and Black Knight Cone, is an isolated ridge on the Big Raven Plateau of the Tahltan Highland in northwestern British Columbia, Canada. It is located southeast of Telegraph Creek at the north side of Mount Edziza Provincial Park between Eve Cone and Mount Edziza.

== History ==
The name of this ridge was officially adopted on January 2, 1980, after having been submitted by the Geological Survey of Canada. It is Tahltan in origin and translates to stone fire.

== Geology ==
Tsekone Ridge is a subglacial mound that formed in the Pleistocene epoch when this area was buried beneath glacial ice during the last ice age. It is associated with the Mount Edziza volcanic complex which in turn forms part of the Northern Cordilleran Volcanic Province.

== See also ==
- List of volcanoes in Canada
- List of Northern Cordilleran volcanoes
- Volcanism of Western Canada
