= Picrite basalt =

Variety of high-magnesium basalt that is very rich in the mineral olivine

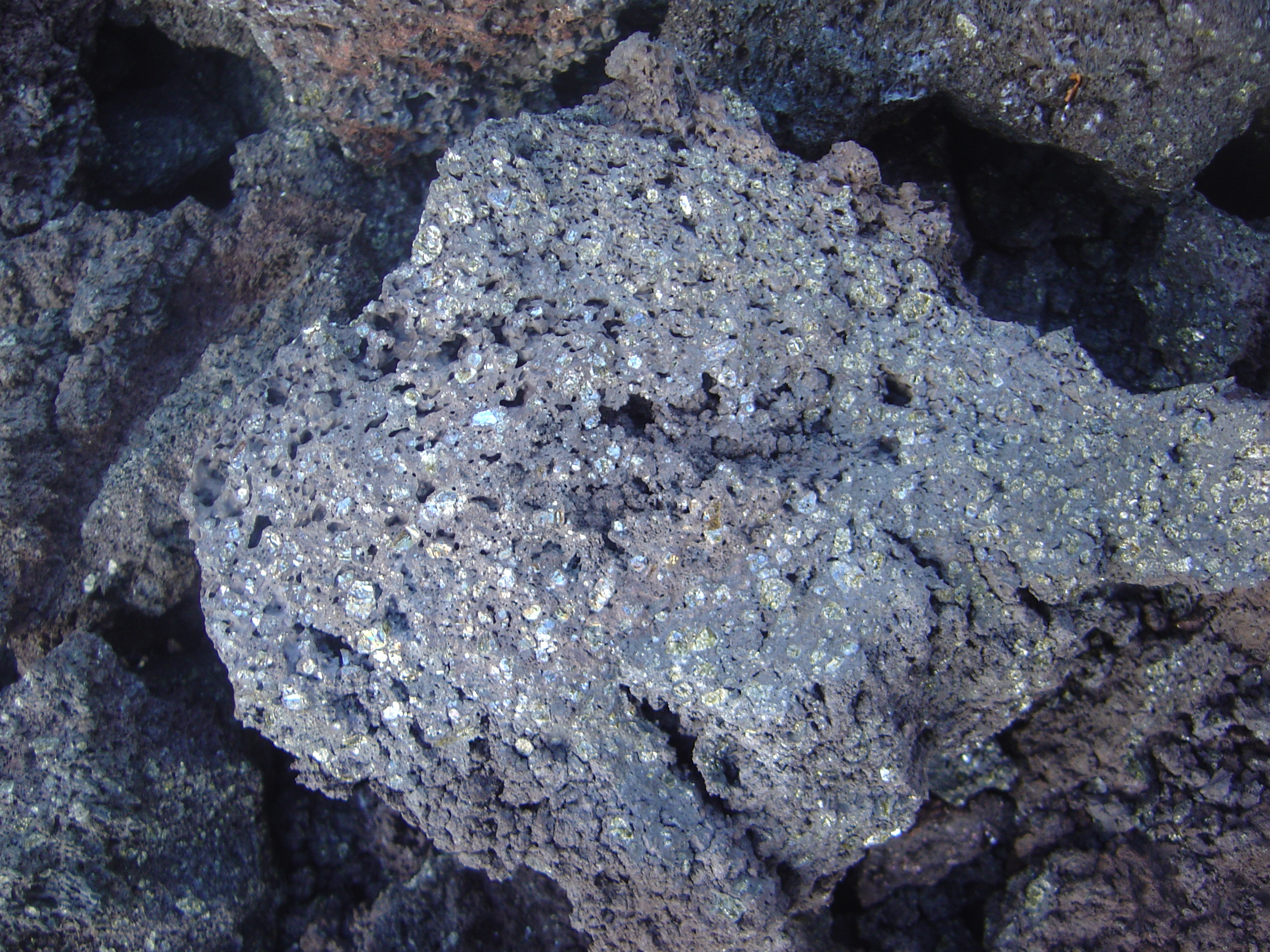
Picrite basalt or oceanite from the Piton de la Fournaise

Picrite basalt or picrobasalt is a variety of high-magnesium olivine basalt that is very rich in the mineral olivine. It is dark with yellow-green olivine phenocrysts (20-50%) and black to dark brown pyroxene, mostly augite.

The olivine-rich picrite basalts that occur with the more common tholeiitic basalts of Kīlauea and other volcanoes of the Hawaiian Islands are the result of accumulation of olivine crystals either in a portion of the magma chamber or in a caldera lava lake. The compositions of these rocks are well represented by mixes of olivine and more typical tholeiitic basalt.

The name "picrite" can also be applied to an olivine-rich alkali basalt: such picrite consists largely of phenocrysts of olivine and titanium-rich augite pyroxene with minor plagioclase set in a groundmass of augite and more sodic plagioclase and perhaps analcite and biotite.

More generally the classification of fine grained rocks recognizes a group known as 'picritic rocks' that are characterised by high magnesium content and low SiO_{2} content. They fit in the TAS classification system only at the lowest level of SiO_{2} (41 to 43% by weight) and Na_{2}O + K_{2}O (up to 3% by weight). They include picrite, komatiite and meimechite.

Picrites and komatiites are somewhat similar chemically (defined as >18% MgO), but differ in having 1 to 3% total alkalis and less than 1% total alkalis respectively. Komatiite lavas are products of more magnesium-rich melts, and good examples exhibit the spinifex texture. They are largely restricted to the Archean. In contrast, picrites are magnesium-rich because crystals of olivine have accumulated in more normal melts by magmatic processes.

Picrite basalt is found in the lavas of Mauna Kea and Mauna Loa in Hawaiʻi, Curaçao, in the Piton de la Fournaise volcano on Réunion Island and various other oceanic island volcanoes.

- Picrite basalt has erupted in historical times from Mauna Loa during the eruptions of 1852 and 1868 (from different flanks of Mauna Loa).
- Picrite basalt with 30% olivine commonly erupts from the Piton de la Fournaise.

In addition to extrusive occurrences, it also occurs in minor intrusions.

== Oceanite ==
Oceanite is a variety of picritic basalt characterized by its large amounts of olivine phenocrysts and lesser amounts of augite and by having a groundmass of olivine, plagioclase and augite. The term was coined by Antoine François Alfred Lacroix in 1923 for rare basalts with more than 50% olivine.

== Common uses ==
Olivine basalt is commonly used by foundries, boilermakers and boiler users to protect the area around a burner tip or to protect a floor from molten metal and other slag. Its use in this fashion is appropriate since olivine is a highly refractory, high-melting-temperature mineral.
