= Triangle Dome =

Trachytic lava dome in British Columbia, Canada

Coordinates: 57.72°N 130.65°W

Triangle Dome is a trachytic lava dome in northern British Columbia, Canada. It is thought to have formed in the Pleistocene period.

== See also ==
- List of volcanoes in Canada
- List of Northern Cordilleran volcanoes
- Volcanism of Canada
- Volcanism of Western Canada
