= Headwall =

Highest cliff of a glacial cirque

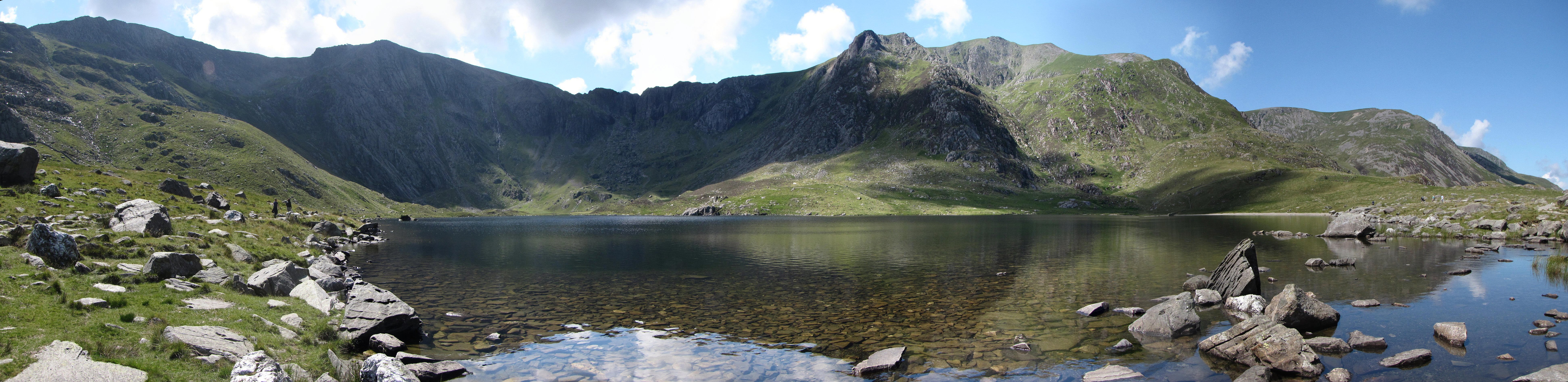
Headwall and corrie lake Cwm Idwal

In physical geography and geology, the headwall of a glacial cirque is its highest cliff. The term has been more broadly used to describe similar geomorphic features of non-glacial origin consisting of a concave depression with convergent slopes typically of 65 percent or greater forming the upper end of a drainage valley.

In civil engineering, a headwall is a small retaining wall placed at the inlet or outlet of a stormwater pipe or culvert.

In medicine, a headwall is the wall at the head end of a hospital bedspace. The bed abuts this headwall perpendicularly, which is furnished with equipment such as regulators for supplemental oxygen, regulators for suction, suction canisters, connections for the call bell system, lighting, electrical outlets, and often a vital signs monitor.
