= BC Geographical Names =

Website for official place names in British Columbia, Canada

The BC Geographical Names (formerly BC Geographical Names Information System or BCGNIS) is a geographic name web service and database for the Canadian province of British Columbia run by the Base Mapping and Geomatic Services Branch of the Integrated Land Management Bureau. BCGNIS is the master database of British Columbia place names. The database contains approximately 50,000 current and former official names and spellings of towns, mountains, rivers, lakes, and other geographic places in British Columbia. About 50% of the names have brief notes about the history of the geographic names, and their use in history.
