= Tahltan Highland =

Upland area of plateau and relatively lower mountain ranges in British Columbia, Canada

- Highland
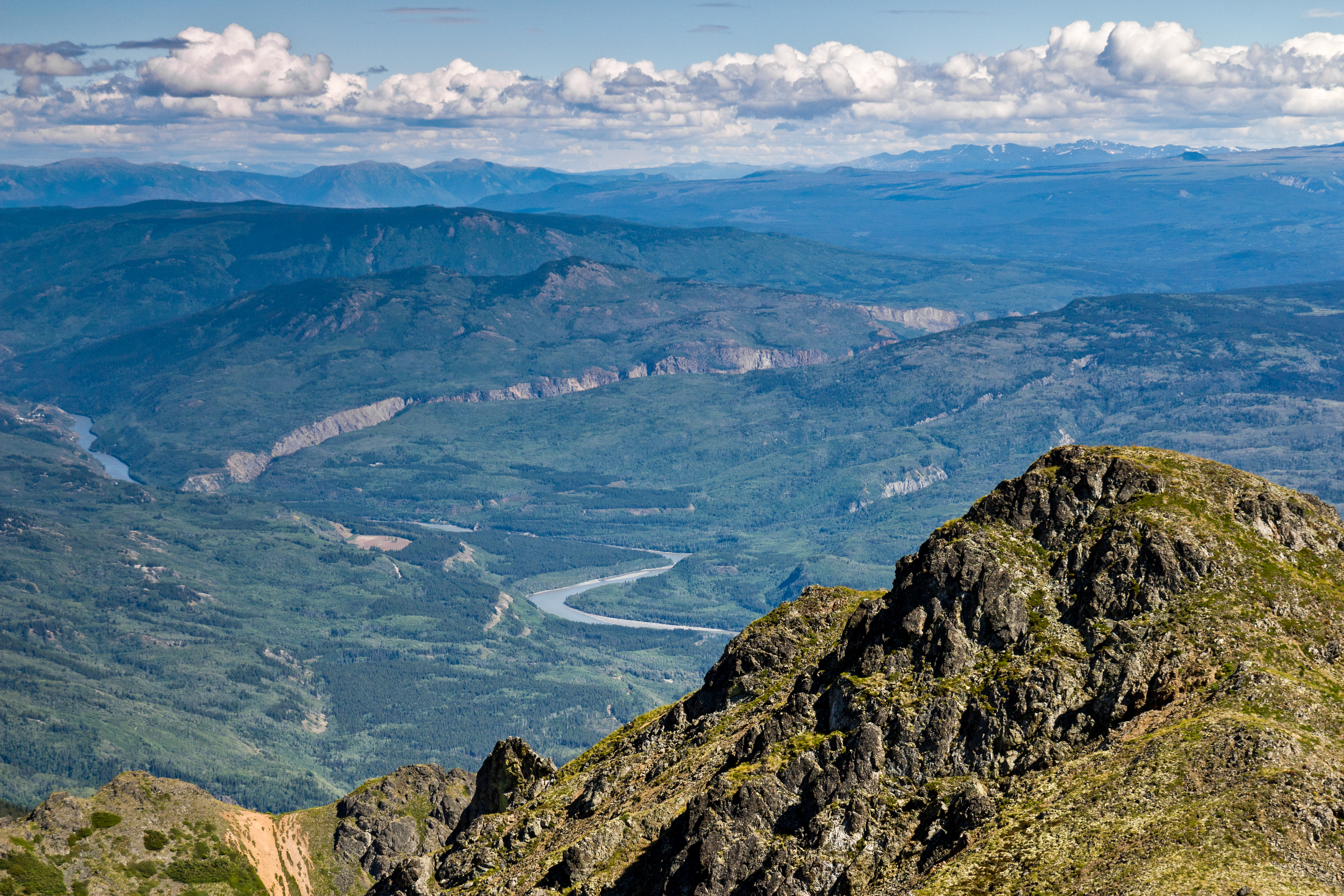
- View across the Tahltan Highland from Mount Glenora

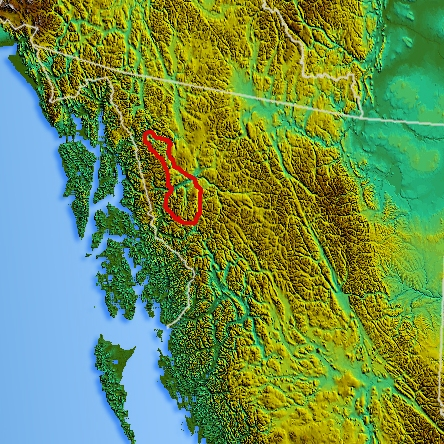
- Coordinates: 58°N 131°W
- Location: British Columbia, Canada
- Part of: Stikine Plateau

The Tahltan Highland is an upland area of plateau and relatively lower mountain ranges in British Columbia, Canada, lying east of the Boundary Ranges and south of the Inklin River (the east fork of the Taku River). Its eastern boundary is formed by the Sheslay River and the Little Tuya River, while its southern boundary extends across the Stikine River and its Grand Canyon to include the Mount Edziza volcanic complex (which includes the Spectrum Range), and the Zagoddetchino massif.
