= Mount Edziza Provincial Park =

Provincial park in British Columbia

- IUCN category Ib (wilderness area)
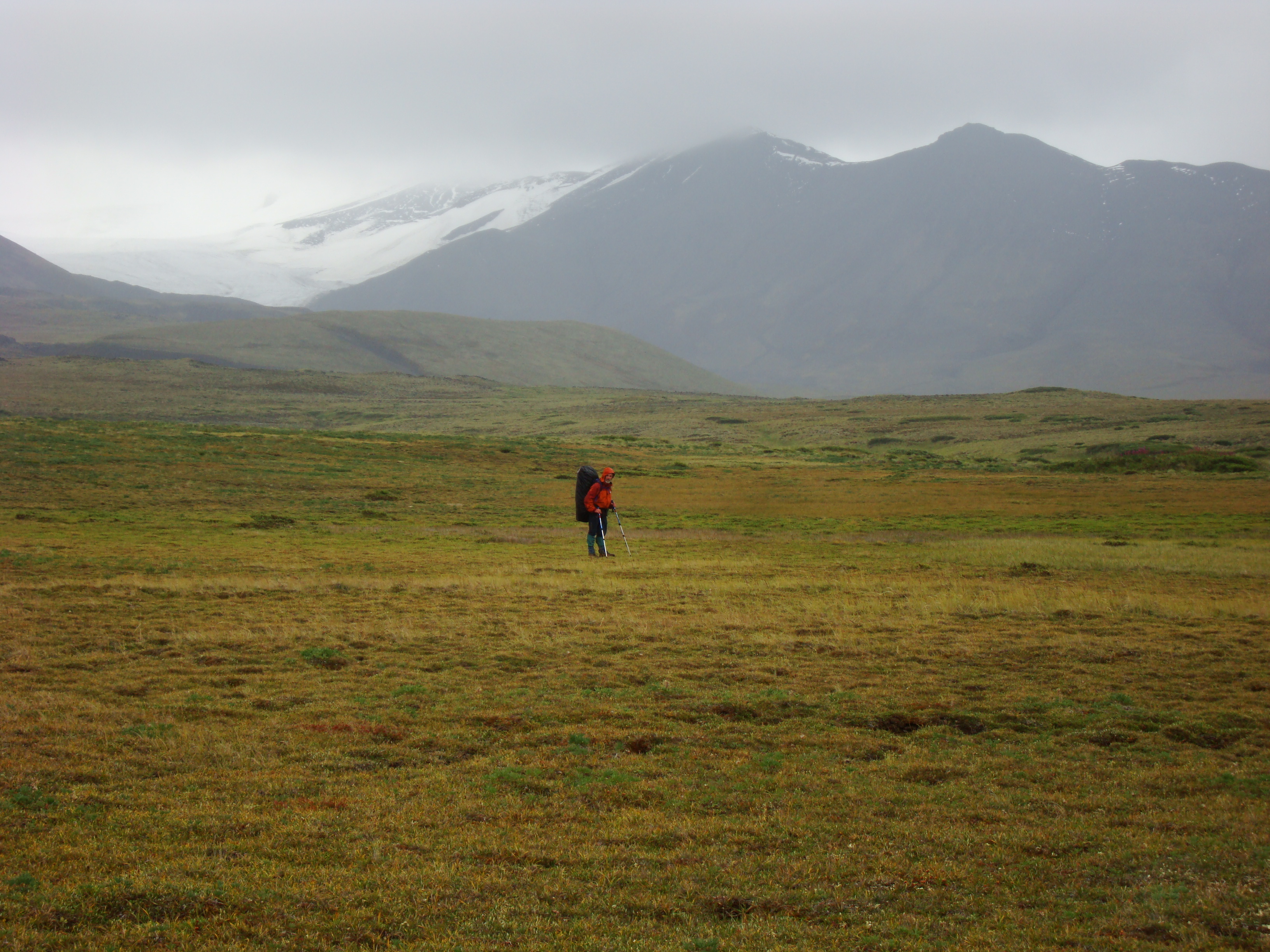
- Alpine tundra with Mount Edziza in the background

- Location within British Columbia
- Interactive map of Mount Edziza Provincial Park
- Location: Cassiar Land District, British Columbia, Canada
- Coordinates: 57°39′N 130°45′W
- Area: 266,180 ha (1,027.7 sq mi)
- Established: 27 July 1972
- Governing body: BC Parks
- Website: Mount Edziza Provincial Park

Mount Edziza Provincial Park is a provincial park in Cassiar Land District of northern British Columbia, Canada. It was established on 27 July 1972 to showcase the Mount Edziza volcanic complex and the surrounding Tahltan Highland.

== Geography ==
The park includes the Mount Edziza volcanic complex, a large group of overlapping shield volcanoes, stratovolcanoes, cinder cones, lava domes and calderas oriented in a north−south trending line. It includes Mount Edziza at its northern end and the Spectrum Range at its southern end, both of which are within the boundaries of Mount Edziza Provincial Park.

== See also ==
- Mount Edziza Recreation Area
- Stikine River Provincial Park
- Tenh Dẕetle Conservancy
