= Cassiar Land District =

Land district in British Columbia, Canada

Coordinates: 57°30′00″N 128°00′00″W

Cassiar Land District is a cadastral survey subdivision of the province of British Columbia, Canada, created with rest of those on Mainland British Columbia via the Lands Act of the Colony of British Columbia in 1860. The British Columbia government's BC Names system, a subdivision of GeoBC, defines a land district as "a territorial division with legally defined boundaries for administrative purposes". All land titles and surveys use the Land District system as the primary point of reference, and entries in BC Names for placenames and geographical objects are so listed.

== Description ==
Cassiar Land District is one of the two northernmost of the province's Land Districts, the other being Peace River Land District to its east, which covers the northeastern portion of the province adjacent to the Northwest Territories and Alberta.

Its western boundary is the BC-Alaska Boundary, its northern the boundary with Yukon at the 60th parallel north. The southern boundary is the 55th parallel north, south of which is Range 5 Coast Land District.

The eastern boundary with Peace River Land District is the 126th meridian west, south from the Yukon boundary to 57 degrees 57 minutes latitude north, thence via the summit-line of the Northern Rockies to where that line reaches the 124th meridian west and generally south along that line of longitude, east of which is the northern portion of Cariboo Land District, to the 55th Parallel North.

== See also ==
- Cassiar (disambiguation)
- List of Land Districts of British Columbia
