= Canim =

Canim or Canım may refer to:

== Canim ==
- Canim Falls
- Canim Lake (British Columbia), a lake in British Columbia, Canada
- Canim Lake, British Columbia, a settlement in British Columbia, Canada
- Tsq̓éscen̓ First Nation, formerly known as the Canim Lake Band, a First Nation in British Columbia, Canada
- Canim River

== Canım ==
- Canım Hoca Mehmed Pasha, 18th-century Ottoman admiral
- "A Canım", song from Maya (Mabel Matiz album)
