= Canim Lake =

Canim Lake may refer to:

- Canim Lake (British Columbia), a lake in British Columbia, Canada
- Canim Lake, British Columbia, a settlement in British Columbia, Canada
- Tsq̓éscen̓ First Nation, formerly known as the Canim Lake Band, a First Nation in British Columbia, Canada

== See also ==
- Canim Falls
- Canim River
- Canim Beach Provincial Park
