= Mahood =

Mahood is a surname. Notable people with the surname include:

- Alan Mahood (born 1973), Scottish football player
- Alex B. Mahood (1888–1970), American architect from West Virginia
- Beverley Mahood (born 1974), Northern Irish/Canadian country music singer
- George Mahood (born 1979), British author and adventurer
- Hattie Mahood (1860–1940), British Baptist deacon and women's suffragist
- Kim Mahood, Australian writer and artist
- Marguerite Mahood, Australian visual artist and art historian
- Mike Mahood (born 1975), Canadian field hockey player
- Molly Mahood (1919–2017), British literary scholar

== Places ==
- Mahood Lake, a lake in the Cariboo region of British Columbia, Canada
- Mahood River, a river in the Cariboo region of British Columbia, Canada
- Mahood Falls, a waterfall at the outlet of Mahood Lake into the Mahood River
- Mount Mahood, mountain in the Victoria Cross Ranges of Alberta, Canada
