= Mahood Falls =

Waterfall on the Canim River in British Columbia, Canada

Coordinates: 51°51′58″N 120°35′13″W

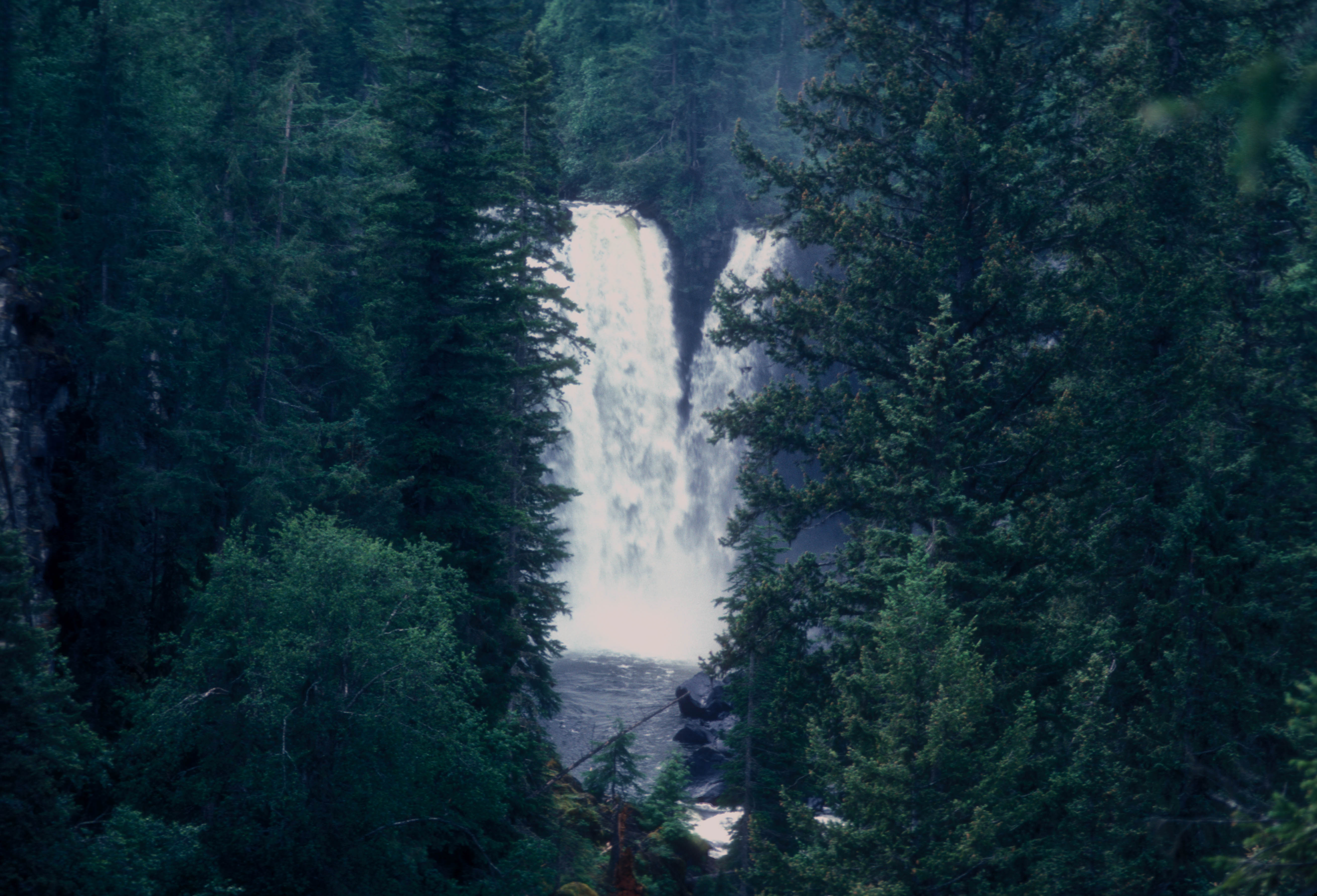
Mahood Falls

Mahood Falls is a waterfall in Wells Gray Provincial Park located on the Canim River between Canim Lake and Mahood Lake and northeast of 100 Mile House, British Columbia, Canada. The waterfall is 30 m (98 ft) high.

Mahood Falls is also a small community spread out along 5 km (3 mi) of road east of Roserim Lake and south of Canim Lake. The population is about 50 people. There was a post office there until 1990, but presently there are no stores or services.

Nearby Mahood Lake and, later, the Mahood Falls community were named after James Adam Mahood who was in charge of a Canadian Pacific Railway survey in this area in 1872.

Joan Uhrig (née McNeil) was born in 1935 at Canim Lake and grew up on the McNeil Ranch, now operated by the third generation of McNeils. According to her, the waterfall was unnamed during the family's early years at Canim Lake and considered to be part of nearby Canim Falls. When the post office was established in the 1950s and named Mahood Falls, tourists on the new road to Mahood Lake began asking for directions to see the waterfall. Answering repeatedly that there was no waterfall became so tiresome that the McNeils selected this waterfall to which they could send the curious tourists. Only the community, not the waterfall, is an official name in the British Columbia Gazetteer.

Access to Mahood Falls (the waterfall) is by a short trail off the Mahood Lake Road. Trail signage on the road says only 'Canim Falls'. It is a 10-minute walk to see Mahood Falls first, then 10 minutes further to see Canim Falls. Both are on the Canim River, downstream from Canim Lake, where there is a large island; the north channel goes over Mahood Falls and the south channel (which carries a lot more water) over Canim Falls.

== Formation ==
Like many other waterfalls in Wells Gray Provincial Park, Mahood Falls owes its formation to the deposits of volcanic rock in the Wells Gray-Clearwater volcanic field. Layer upon layer of fresh lava created flat areas, over which enormous floods flowed at the end of the last ice age. These floods carved the canyons below Mahood Falls and Canim Falls. Erosion by wind and rain created a natural bridge in the cliffs beside the trail, one of only three in Wells Gray Park.

== See also ==
- List of waterfalls
- List of waterfalls of Canada
- List of waterfalls in British Columbia
- Mahood Lake for more about James Adam Mahood's survey expedition
- Mahood River
- Canim Falls
