= Mahood Lake =

Lake in British Columbia, Canada

Coordinates: 51°54′41″N 120°22′54″W

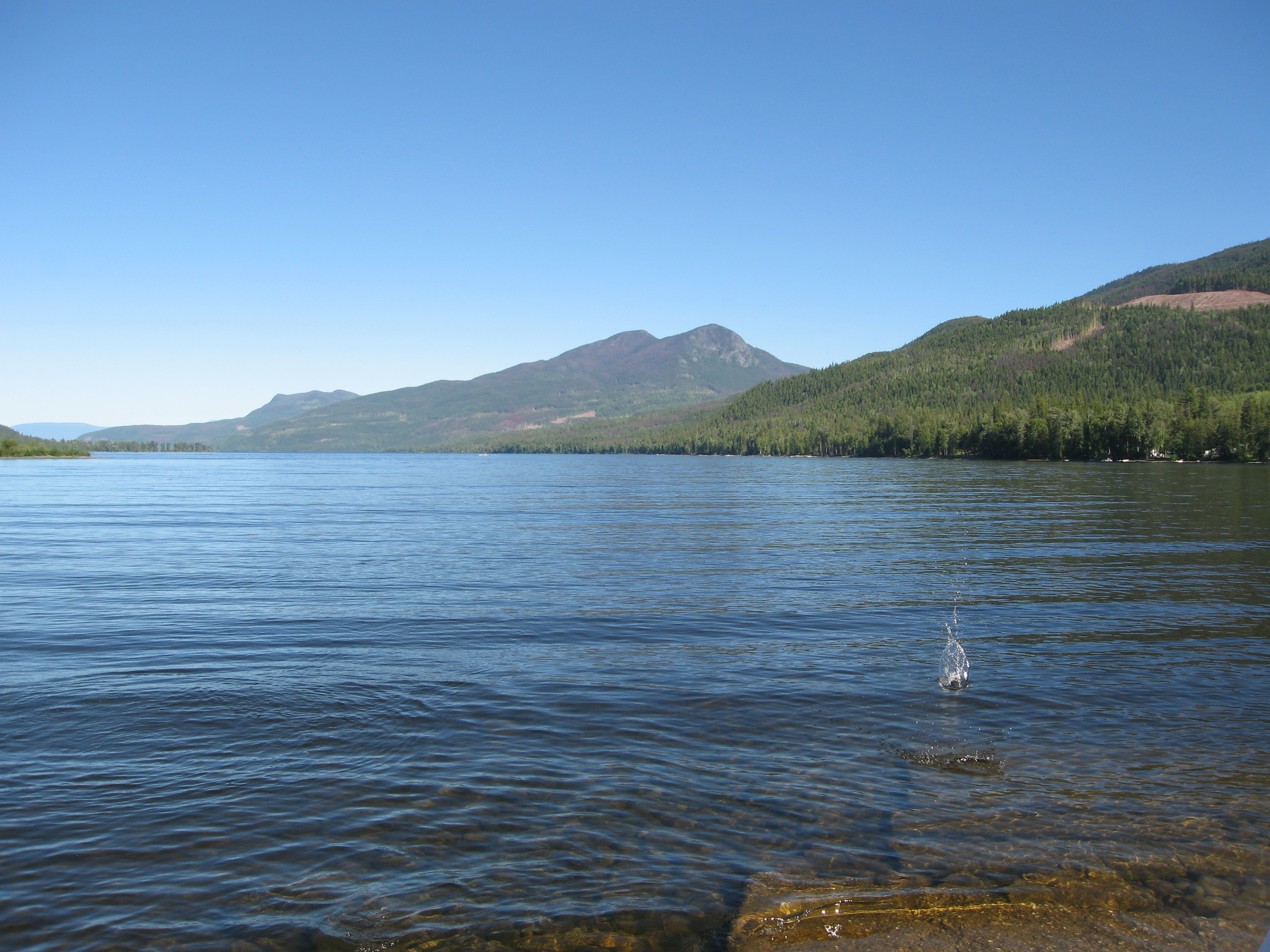

- Location within British Columbia
- Location: South Cariboo, British Columbia
- Primary inflows: Canim River, Deception Creek
- Primary outflows: Mahood River
- Basin countries: Canada
- Max. length: 21 km (13 mi)
- Max. width: 2.2 km (1.4 mi)
- Surface area: 33.11 km^{2} (12.78 sq mi)
- Average depth: 94.2 m (309 ft)
- Max. depth: 208 m (682 ft)
- Water volume: 3.12 km^{3} (0.75 cu mi)
- Shore length^{1}: 47.9 km (29.8 mi)
- Surface elevation: 630 m (2,070 ft)
- Islands: 0
- ^{1} Shore length is not a well-defined measure.

Mahood Lake is a lake in the South Cariboo region of the Interior of British Columbia in Wells Gray Provincial Park. It is drained by the Mahood River, a tributary of the Clearwater River which has cut a deep canyon into Cambrian rocks and Pleistocene glacial moraines. Mahood Lake is fed by the short Canim River, which drains nearby Canim Lake to the west via Canim Falls and Mahood Falls.

The lake is 630 metres in elevation, 208 metres deep at its deepest point, approximately 33.5 km² in area, 21 km (13.0 mi) in length (east to west) and a maximum of 2.2 km (1.4 mi) in width. Mount Mahood is immediately south of the lake and rises to 1,812 m (5,945 ft).

== Discovery and naming ==
There are no written records about First Nations visits to Mahood Lake, but they did use this valley because pictographs can be seen about halfway along the south shore. The Mahood Lake area was the centre of considerable attention between 1872 and 1874 when three separate groups of Canadian Pacific Railway surveyors passed along its shores. Their objective was to find a feasible route for the railway from Yellowhead Pass in the Rocky Mountains westward to the Pacific Ocean. Marcus Smith, the head of British Columbia surveys, was a strong advocate for the major Pacific railway terminus being at the head of Bute Inlet, a fjord which penetrates the Coast Mountains some 225 km north of Vancouver. While examining his favoured route eastward from the inlet in September 1872, he spent a grueling few days traversing Mahood Lake's rugged northern shore. His diary contains a gripping account of the hazards along this route and a declaration that "These last two days were the hardest I have had on the surveys, and we were in constant danger." His journey coincided with that of James Adam Mahood, who had been chosen by the C.P.R. in 1871 to head another survey party heading west to the Chilcotin. By chance, on September 17, 1872, the two expeditions met near the mouth of Mahood Lake. Smith and Mahood spent a day together comparing their notes and sketches.

Between 1872 and 1881, about 20 survey parties fanned out across British Columbia to determine the best route for the new railway. The expeditions of Smith, Mahood and a third surveyor, Joseph Hunter, all visited what is now Wells Gray Park. When the more southern Kicking Horse Pass was chosen instead in 1881, all of these meticulously examined routes across the Canadian Cordilleran were abandoned. Only three place names in the Park recognize those 10 wasted years of surveys: Mahood River & Lake, Marcus Falls, and Murtle River & Lake (Murtle refers to Joseph Hunter's birthplace in Scotland).

Born in Saint Andrews, New Brunswick, in 1843, Mahood trained as a civil engineer. His first work was with the European and North American Railway in New Brunswick. At age 21, he was Chief Engineer of the harbour defences at San Francisco and, the following year, he was engaged by the Collins Overland Telegraph Company to survey the proposed telegraph line from North America to Europe via the Bering Strait and Russia. Mahood died at his sister’s home in Victoria, British Columbia, on February 23, 1901. He is remembered in and near Wells Gray Park by Mahood Lake, Mahood River, Mahood Mountain, Mahood Falls, and the community of Mahood Falls.

== Mahood Lake Lodge ==
In 1939, long-time settlers at Canim Lake, Benjie and Florence McNeil, built Mahood Lake Lodge at the west end of the lake. It was a log structure with dining room and lounge on the main floor and 13 guest rooms upstairs. For the next 20 years, the Lodge attracted celebrities for the excellent fishing in Mahood Lake and even earned a recommendation from Duncan Hines, the travel writer. The McNeils sold the Lodge in 1959 and moved to 100 Mile House where their seven children could attend school instead of relying on a correspondence education program. The Lodge burned to the ground in 1962. Mahood Lake Campground, operated by B.C. Parks, is now on the site of the Lodge.

== Geography ==
This deep valley was carved by glaciers, but there are remnants of lava flows north of the east end of the lake and along the Canim River upstream.

The Canim River is the major inflow. It is 8 km (5.0 mi) long, draining Canim Lake, and most of this distance is through a rugged gorge carved in lava. The river drops 142 m (466 ft) between the lakes, partly accounted for by two waterfalls, Canim Falls and Mahood Falls. The other major inflow is Deception Creek on the lake's north shore which has a 50 m (164 ft) high waterfall, Deception Falls.

The outflow from Mahood Lake is the Mahood River. It is only 7 km (4.3 mi) long and drops over Sylvia Falls and Goodwin Falls before flowing into the Clearwater River.

== Access and trails ==
The only road access to Mahood Lake goes to the west end from either Little Fort on the Yellowhead Highway #5 or 100 Mile House on the Cariboo Highway #97. Mahood Lake Campground has 37 campsites and is operated by the Wells Gray Park concessionaire. It has a sandy beach and a boat launching ramp. The Mahood Lake Road ends 5 km (3.1 mi) past the campground at Deception Point which is one of only three private properties within Wells Gray Park.

There are four hiking trails near Mahood Lake Campground: Canim and Mahood Falls, Canim River, Whale Lake and Deception Falls. At the east end of Mahood Lake, there is a trail along the Mahood River past Sylvia and Goodwin Falls to the Clearwater River. Refer to Exploring Wells Gray Park for detailed descriptions and starting points.

== See also ==
- List of lakes of British Columbia
- Canim Lake
- Helmcken Falls
- Wells Gray-Clearwater volcanic field
- Canadian Pacific Railway survey parties
