= Canim Lake, British Columbia =

Unincorporated settlement in British Columbia, Canada

Coordinates: 51.77856°N 120.92102°W

Canim Lake /ˈkænɪm/ is an unincorporated settlement with a pop. of 228 and First Nations Indian reserve community in British Columbia, Canada. It is located northeast of 100 Mile House in the Cariboo Region.

The settlement is home to the Canim Lake Band (Tsq'escen') of the Northern Shuswap Tribal Council, and lies at the southwestern end of Canim Lake.

"Canim" means a type of large canoe in the Chinook Jargon.

== See also ==
- Canim Beach Provincial Park
- Canim Falls
- Canim River
