= Moul Falls =

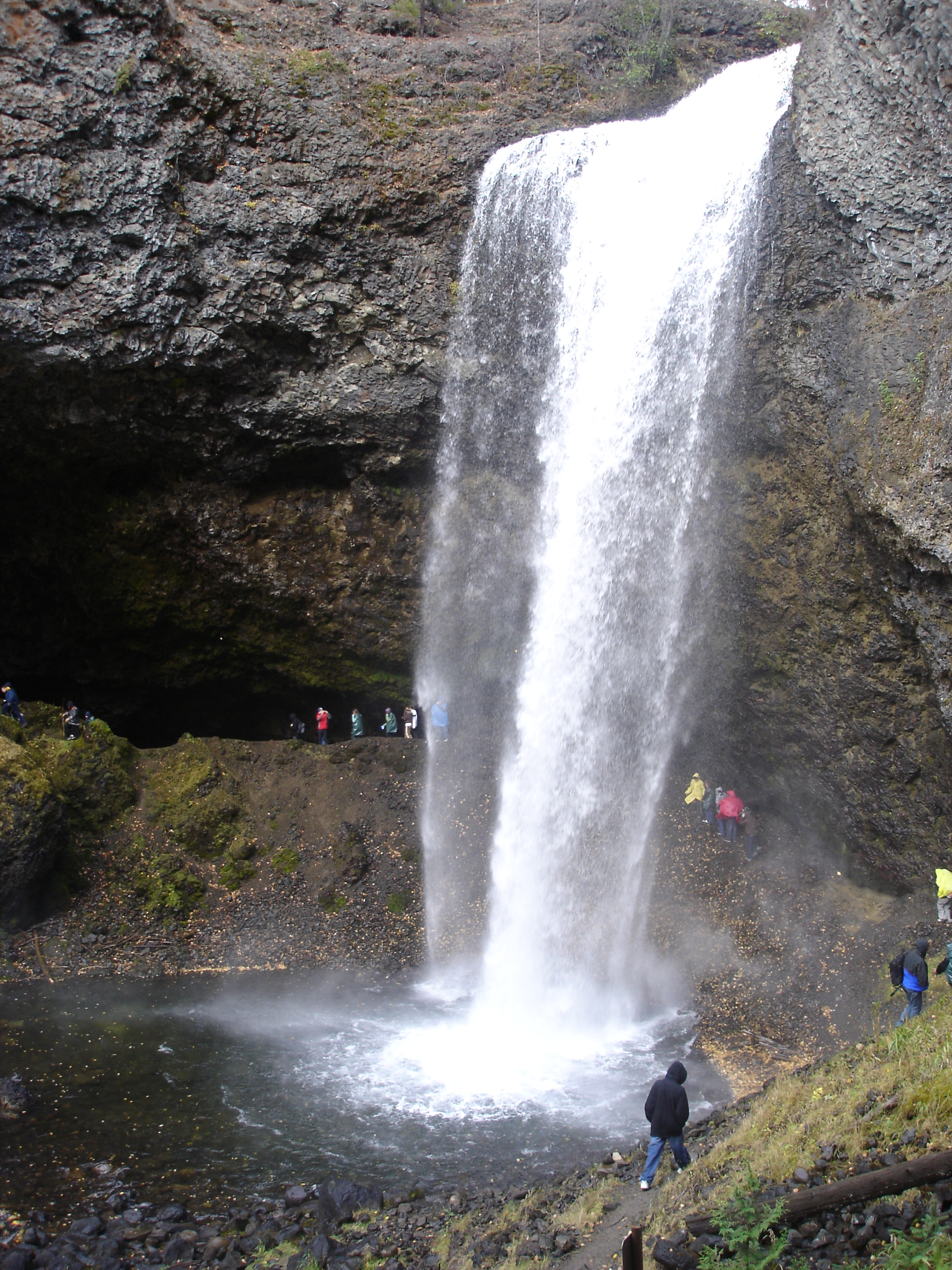
- Interactive map of Moul Falls
- Location: Wells Gray Provincial Park, British Columbia, Canada
- Coordinates: 51°50′05″N 120°02′59″W
- Type: Plunge
- Total height: 35 m (115 ft)
- Total width: 9 m (30 ft)
- Watercourse: Grouse Creek

Moul Falls is a waterfall on Grouse Creek in Wells Gray Provincial Park, east-central British Columbia, Canada. It is one of the park's most popular short hiking trails. It is the only waterfall in the park that one can stand behind. Moul Falls is the third highest waterfall in the park, measured as a straight, unbroken drop.

Grouse Creek rises from snowmelt, a lake and springs at a pass between Trophy Mountain and Table Mountain. It flows 18 km (11.2 mi) west before tumbling over Moul Falls, then McDiarmid Falls, and entering the Clearwater River.

== Naming ==
George William Moul was one of the earliest settlers in this area and homesteaded east of the falls in 1915. Under land pre-emption regulations, Moul was granted a war leave in 1918 and left the Clearwater Valley to serve in World War I. Moul returned to Canada after the war and settled in Vancouver where he worked for the Canadian Pacific Railway. He died in 1947 and some of his relatives still live in Vancouver.

Grouse Creek is the fourth name for the stream that forms Moul Falls. No other Wells Gray Park place name has been changed more times. Surveyor Robert Lee referred to it as Beaver Creek on his maps drawn in 1912 to 1914. After the area was settled, the stream became known as Grouse Creek because of the profusion of blue grouse that inhabited these forests. The waterfall and creek were called Moul starting in the 1930s. In the 1980s, locals gradually reverted to using the Grouse Creek name, even though "Moul Creek" appeared on all the maps. The Ministry of Highways erected a "Grouse Creek" sign on the Clearwater Valley Road bridge in 1990 which confused travellers even more. The following year, the Friends of Wells Gray Park requested a ruling from the Geographical Names Office in Victoria. After an investigation of local and historical usage, a decision was announced in favour of Grouse Creek. Moul Falls remained unchanged.

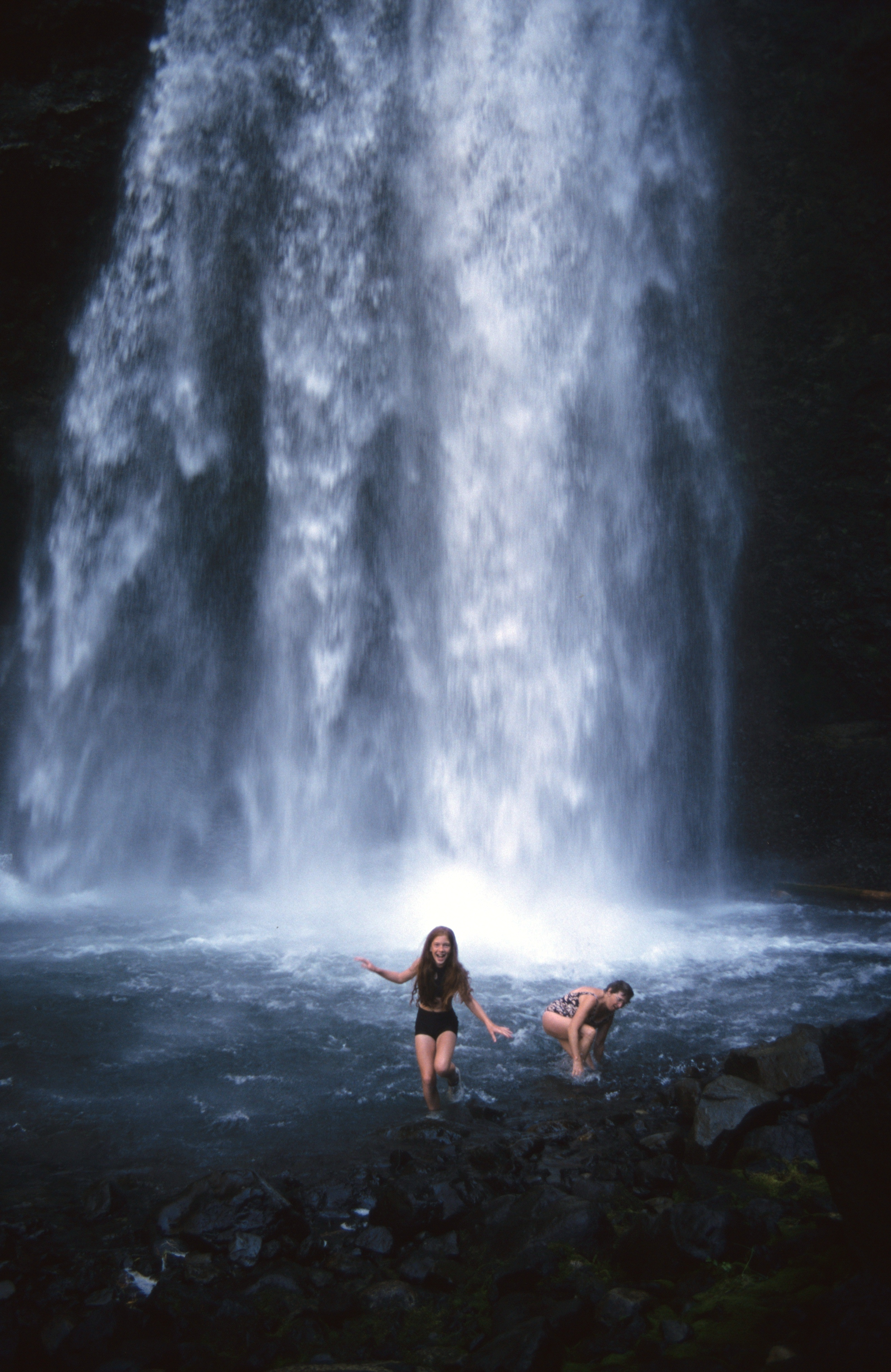
Moul Falls plunge pool

== Access ==
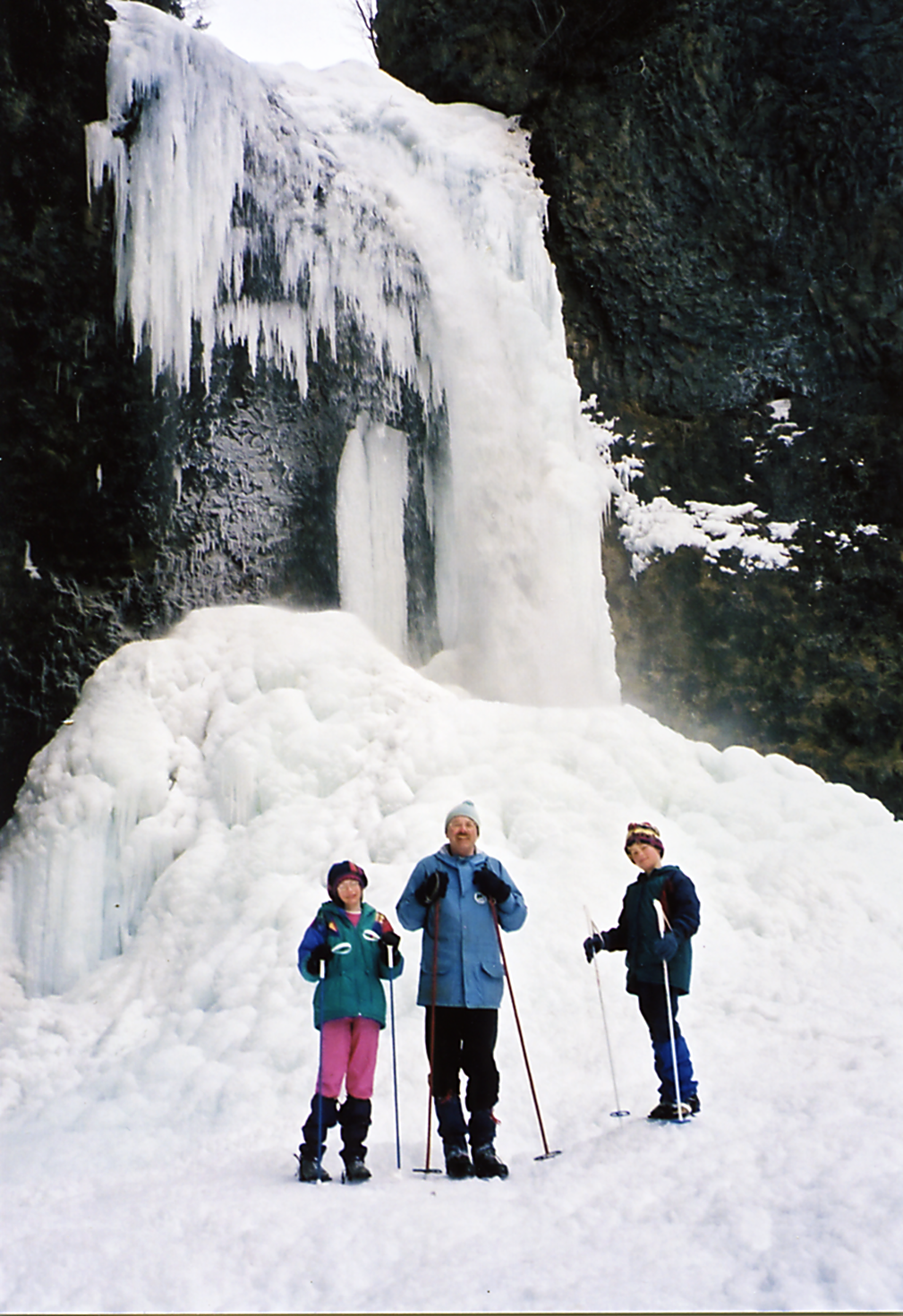
Moul Falls ice cone

The trail to Moul Falls starts at a well-signed parking lot on Clearwater Valley Road (also called Wells Gray Park Road). The hike takes 1 hour each way and descends 120 m (394 ft) to the bottom of the falls. A narrow canyon funnels Grouse Creek to the brink of the falls, so a view from above is difficult. The stairs to the bottom of Moul Falls were built in 1997 by the Neave family who own the adjoining land, Interior Whitewater Expeditions which operates rafting trips on the Clearwater River, and the Friends of Wells Gray Park. Later that year, Wells Gray Park was expanded to include Moul Falls and the stairs are now maintained by B.C. Parks. From July until winter, it is possible to walk behind the falls and into the large cave that has been eroded by the spray. The plunge pool is a pleasant swim on a hot summer day.

A foot bridge crosses Grouse Creek just above the falls. Trails lead to McDiarmid Falls (downstream from Moul Falls) and along the cliffs above the Clearwater River.

In winters that are very cold and snowy, Moul Falls builds a giant ice cone which sometimes stretches from top to bottom. The best access is using snowshoes. Cross-country skiers with expert skills can get to the falls, but the trail has several steep downhill sections.

== See also ==
- List of waterfalls
- List of waterfalls of Canada
- List of waterfalls in British Columbia
