= Canim Lake (British Columbia) =

Lake in British Columbia, Canada

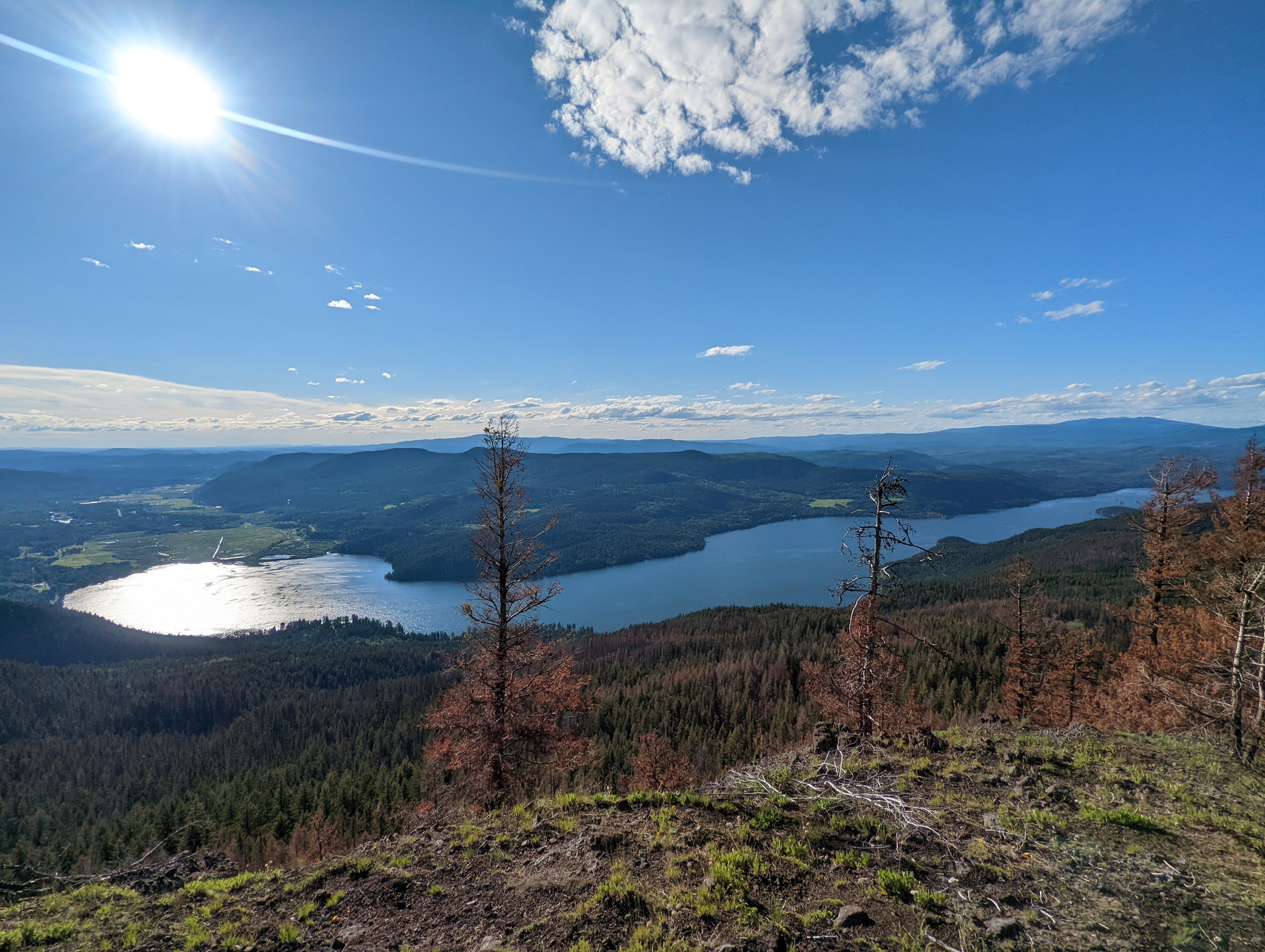

- Location within British Columbia
- Location: British Columbia, Canada
- Coordinates: 51.86314°N 120.76542°W
- Primary inflows: Bridge Creek, Eagle Creek, Jim Creek, Boss Creek
- Primary outflows: Canim River
- Basin countries: Canada
- Max. length: 26.5 km (16 mi)
- Surface area: 56.1 km^{2} (22 mi^{2})
- Average depth: 84.1 m (276 ft)
- Max. depth: 208.5 m (684 ft)
- Water volume: 4.7 km^{3} (1 mi^{3})
- Surface elevation: 772.4 m (2,534 ft)
- Frozen: Rarely
- Islands: Eagle Island, Canoe Island, Round Island, Sunken Island/Reef

Canim Lake /ˈkænɪm/ is a lake in British Columbia, Canada. Its west end is 36 km (22.4 mi) northeast of 100 Mile House. "Canim" means a type of large canoe in the Chinook Jargon. Canim Lake is 26.5 km (16.5 mi) long. It is also part of the territory of the Shuswap First Nation where the ancestors are part of the Lake Division of the Shuswap nation of the Interior Nations of British Columbia. The Reilly Commission states that the 2,029 hectares region around Canim Lake are set aside for the Shuswap First Nation. In the summer of 1995, there was an archaeological evidence of an ancient civilization and evidence of carbon dated as 4,300 old.

== Activities ==
Canim Lake is known for its summer and winter activities. During the summer, recreational activities include fishing, hiking, horseback riding, cliff jumping, water skiing, canoeing and kayaking. Multiple resorts located around the lake provide horse adventures for both novice and experienced riders; options include overnight and multi-day trips. Hiking and mountain biking are also common summer activities in the surrounding backcountry. Canim Lake is also a well known area for freshwater fishing. Many types of fish can be caught including kokanee, rainbow trout, lake trout, and burbot. Wildlife are often seen around the lake and include black bears, moose, deer, wolves, foxes, cougars, beavers, otters, migratory waterfowl, osprey, bald eagles and song birds. Winter activities include snowmobiling, cross-country skiing, dogsledding and ice fishing.

== Places to See ==
Canim Falls can be reached from the south side of the lake. It is 25 m (82 ft) high. The Canim River has cut into a lava plateau that came from the Wells Gray Clearwater Volcanic Field. The falls are located in Wells Gray Provincial Park. A 1-km trail from the park road leads to Canim Falls with a view of Mahood Falls on the way.

== Provincial Parks and BC Recreation Sites around Canim Lake ==
- Canim Beach Provincial Park
- Wells Gray Provincial Park
- Schoolhouse Lake Provincial Park
- Howard Lake Recreation Site
- Christmas Lake Recreation Site
- Succour Lake Recreation Site
- Paddy Lake Recreation Site
- Greenlee Lake Recreation Site
- Hendrix Creek Falls Recreation Site

== Private Resorts and Campsites ==
- South Point Resort
- Canim Lake Resort
- Kayanara Guest Ranch & Resort
- Rainbow Resort
- Reynolds Resort
- Minac Holliday Village (Closed)

== Fishing ==
Canim Lake contains numerous fish species including Rainbow Trout, Lake Trout, Kokanee and Burbot. Online records indicate between 1938 and 1998, the Government of British Columbia stocked Canim Lake (sporadically) with hatchery reared Kokanee and Rainbow Trout. Since 1998 all fish species in Canim Lake are self-sustaining.

== Settlement ==
The settlement Canim Lake of the Canim Lake Band is located west of the lake.

== Gallery ==
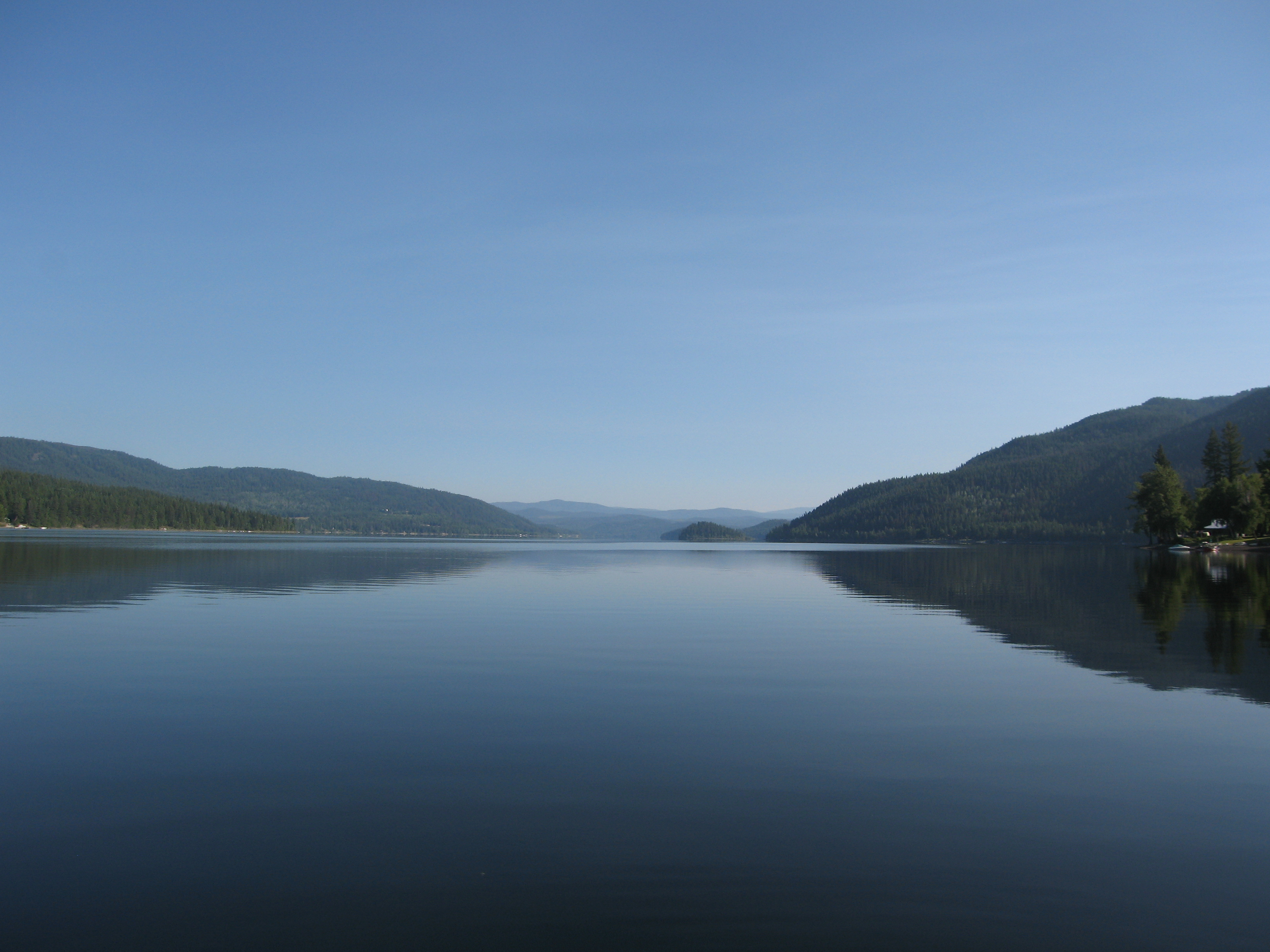
Looking North

== See also ==
- List of lakes of British Columbia
