= Wells Gray Provincial Park =

Provincial park in British Columbia, Canada

- IUCN category Ib (wilderness area)
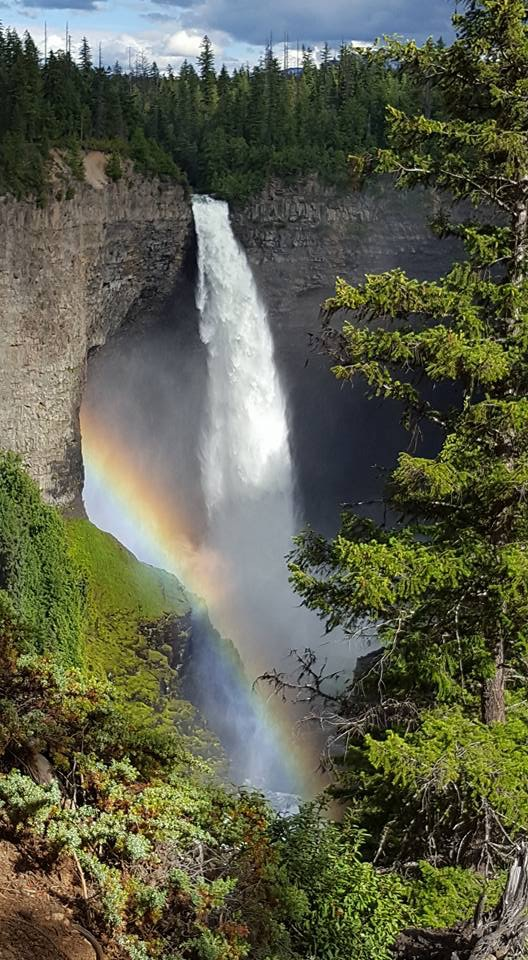
- Helmcken Falls

- Location within British Columbia
- Interactive map of Wells Gray Provincial Park
- Location: British Columbia, Canada
- Nearest city: Clearwater
- Coordinates: 52°19′26″N 120°08′59″W
- Area: 541,516 ha (2,090.80 sq mi)
- Established: November 28, 1939
- Visitors: 104,731 (in 2019)
- Governing body: BC Parks
- Website: bcparks.ca/explore/parkpgs/wells_gry/

Wells Gray Provincial Park is a large wilderness park located in east-central British Columbia, Canada. The park protects most of the southern, and highest, regions of the Cariboo Mountains and covers 5,415 square kilometres (541,516 hectares or 1.3 million acres). It is British Columbia's fifth largest provincial park, after Tweedsmuir, Tatshenshini, Spatsizi and Northern Rocky Mountains.

== Topography ==
The boundaries of Wells Gray Park encompass 60 percent of the drainage basin of the Clearwater River, and most water that originates in the park flows into this river. The northern two-thirds of the park is extremely rugged with relief ranging from Clearwater Lake at an elevation of 680 m (2,231 ft) to 2,946 m (9,665 ft) at Mount Lyons on the northern park boundary, 4.9 km (3.0 mi) west of Mount Pierrway. These summits are part of the Cariboo Mountains, and most of the east boundary of the park follows the mountain divide between drainage into the North Thompson River and into the Clearwater River.

Individual mountain groups dominate the topography of the northern park region and are separated by deep glacial valleys, several of which contain large lakes such as Clearwater, Azure and Hobson. The ruggedness of its features has ensured that northern Wells Gray remains little known except to the hardiest of backpackers.

The southern third of Wells Gray Park is traversed by the Clearwater Valley Road, although large areas are accessible only by trail. The dominant topography features volcanic plateaus, lava flows and deep canyons which are crowned by several peaks over 2,300 m (7,546 ft) high. The waterfalls, for which Wells Gray is famous, usually result from the interaction of volcanic eruptions and glacial activity. The best known is Helmcken Falls, the fourth highest waterfall in Canada, which plunges 141 m (463 ft) over the edge of one of these volcanic plateaus.

=== Highest mountains ===
The eight highest mountains in Wells Gray Park are:

1) Mount Lyons, 2946 m. The first recorded ascent was made by Bill McKenzie and Roger Wallis on August 18, 2005. It is named after Chess Lyons, Wells Gray Park surveyor in 1940, naturalist, author, photographer, and explorer.

2) Mount Goodall, 2930 m. The mountain consists of 11 distinct summits and extends for nearly 8 km in a northwest to southeast direction. On the northeast side, an unbreached wall of rock and ice rises between 400 m and 1,300 m from the Goodall Glacier. The first ascent was achieved on August 21, 2006, by Roger Wallis, Don Chiasson, and Jim Lundy. They established its height, only 16 m lower than Mount Lyons. As of 2022, only four of Goodall's 11 summits have been conquered. Mount Goodall is one of six peaks in this area named in 1966 in honor of Canadian soldiers from the Quesnel area who were killed in action during World War II; it is named after Trooper Walter Henry Goodall, age 24.

3) Garnet Peak, 2876 m. This is a prominent landmark from many viewpoints in southern Wells Gray Park. It is located north of Azure Lake. The first ascent was by Hugh Neave, Tor Schmid and Barbara Hargreaves on August 29, 1974. It was long believed to be the park's highest mountain until expeditions to the north boundary found the above two peaks were higher.

4) Black Cone, 2861 m. This is the second highest summit of the Goodall group and has been unofficially called "The Black Cone". Its first ascent was on July 30, 2012, by Paul Geddes, Norm Greene, and Bill McKenzie.

5) Mount Pierrway, 2854 m. It was first climbed in 1969 by Art Maki and Art Wilder. The second ascent was in 1987 and the third in 2005. This honors another World War II casualty, Private Alfred Pierrway, age 22.

6) "Unnamed Peak, 2847 m, 3.7 km WSW of Mount Pierrway". It is located on the north park boundary near Mount Lyons. As of 2022, there is no record of this peak being climbed, therefore it is Wells Gray Park's highest unclimbed mountain.

7) Mount Hugh Neave, 2829 m. Located east of Hobson Lake and north of Garnet Peak. Hugh Neave, first to summit Garnet Peak, and Peter Cowan attempted to climb it in 1972 via Hobson Glacier to the east, but were forced to turn back by difficult terrain. It was named after Hugh Neave after his death in 1988. Two expeditions in the 1990s, two in 2015, and one in 2017 failed to reach the summit. The first successful ascent was on August 27, 2019, by JF Labranche and Travis Goodridge.

8) "Unnamed Peak, 2797 m, 3.1 km SE of Mount Beaman".

== History ==
Prior to the arrival of Europeans, the Wells Gray area was a valued hunting ground to the Secwepemc (Shuswap), Tsilhqot'in (Chilcotin) and Canim Lake Indigenous People. This resulted in a conflict around 1875 over access to caribou herds. Geographic names like "Battle Mountain", "Fight Lake", "Battle Creek" and "Indian Valley" recall this period. The Overlanders expedition to the Cariboo goldfields rafted down the North Thompson River in 1862. When they arrived at the mouth of the Clearwater River, they noted its distinct clarity compared to the muddy North Thompson and named it Clear Water. In 1863, the first tourists, Lord Milton and Dr. Cheadle, traveled through the North Thompson Valley and solidified the Clearwater River name by publishing it in their journal, The Northwest Passage by Land (London, 1865).

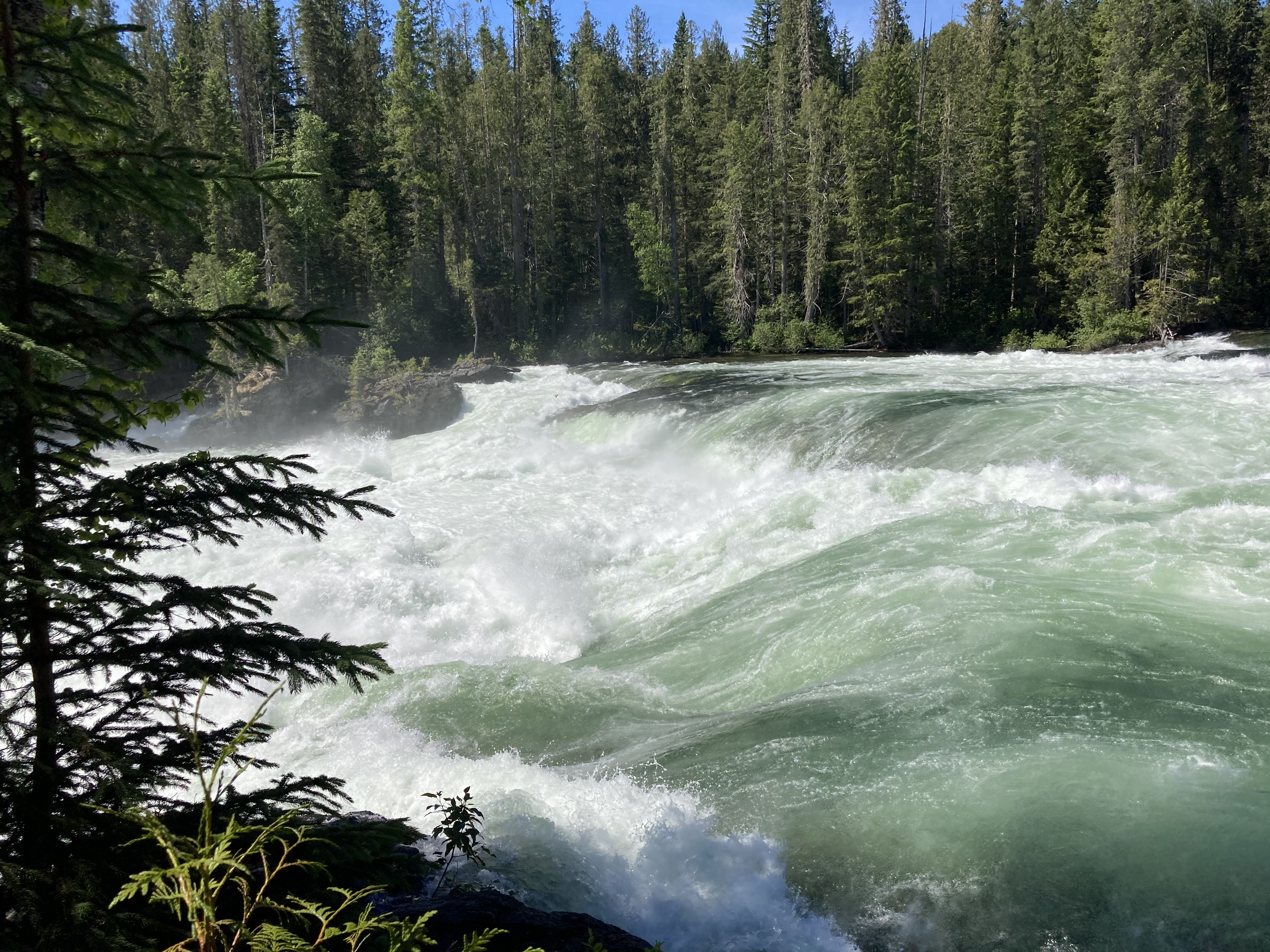
Marcus Falls

=== Surveying for the Canadian Pacific Railway ===
Between 1872 and 1881, about 20 survey parties fanned out across British Columbia trying to find the best route for the Canadian Pacific Railway between Yellowhead Pass in the Rocky Mountains and the Pacific Coast. Three survey parties visited what is now Wells Gray Park. In 1873, Marcus Smith, searching for the best route to Bute Inlet, visited Hobson Lake and Mahood Lake. In 1874, the railway dispatched a survey party to explore the headwaters of the Clearwater River, under the leadership of E.W. Jarvis, but the route was described as "clearly impracticable for a railway line". When the more southern Kicking Horse Pass was chosen instead in 1881, all the meticulously examined routes in what is now Wells Gray Park were abandoned. Only three place names in the park recognize those 10 years of surveys: Murtle River & Lake, Mahood River & Lake, and Marcus Falls.

=== Helmcken Falls ===
Helmcken Falls was discovered in 1913 by Robert Lee, a land surveyor working for the British Columbia government. He was so impressed with the waterfall that he wrote a letter from his remote camp to Sir Richard McBride, Premier of British Columbia, requesting that the falls be named "McBride Falls". Three weeks later, Lee received a reply from the Premier stating that the waterfall was instead to be called Helmcken Falls. This name honoured John Sebastian Helmcken, a physician with the Hudson's Bay Company who arrived in Victoria in 1850. He helped bring British Columbia into Canadian Confederation in 1871. Dr. Helmcken died in 1920 at the age of 95, but never actually saw the falls himself.

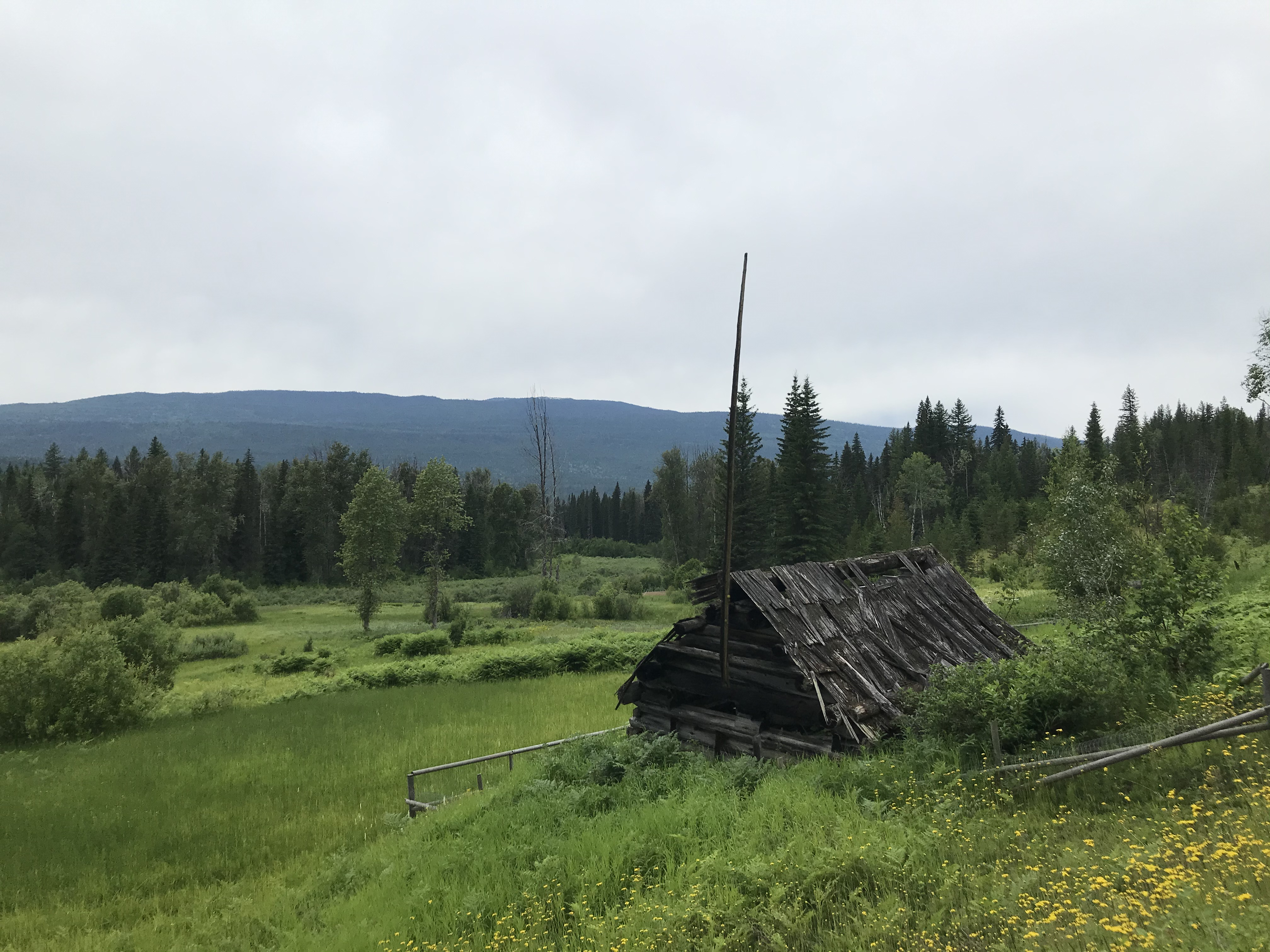
John Ray's 1929 cabin at the Ray Farm

=== Homesteaders ===
The first homesteaders in what is now Wells Gray Park were John Ray in 1911 at The Horseshoe, who was given land by the Canim Lake Band, and Michael Majerus in 1912 on the Murtle River near Dawson Falls. Both cleared land, built cabins and established isolated lifestyles far from other people. Other settlers who arrived between 1918 and 1925 were the Ludtke family, Lewis Rupell, Pete McDougal, Jack Zellers, Dave Anderson, Alex Fage and Herman Ordschig.

=== 1926 Clearwater Valley fire ===
On July 16, 1926, the entire Clearwater Valley between First Canyon and the Murtle River was destroyed by a forest fire. It started from a lightning strike west of the Clearwater River, smouldered for several weeks, then was fanned by winds and moved rapidly north through the homesteads. The Ludtke family immersed themselves in Battle Creek for 8 hours, dampening some blankets to cover their heads, and their livestock and even wild animals joined them for protection. The Rupell cabin was the only one that did not burn. The fire crossed the Murtle River and burned part way up Kilpill Mountain. After its initial rampage, it burned slowly in the marshes of the Murtle Plateau until mid-August, when it was finally extinguished by a heavy rain. Over 125,000 acres (510 km^{2}) of the Clearwater Valley were burned and most settlers lost almost everything they owned. However, there was not a single human fatality.

=== Establishing a park ===
Soon after Lee's 1913 discovery of Helmcken Falls, a park was suggested to preserve the waterfall. Eventually 1925 the B.C. Auto Club started a campaign to establish a park around the falls. The Minister of Lands, Duff Pattullo, was not interested and rebuffed the club, stating that there were no benefits to protecting waterfalls which "wouldn't go away". In the mid-1930s, there were more recommendations for a park at Helmcken Falls. Finally the government began to listen, mostly because a new Minister of Lands, Arthur Wellesley Gray, was interested in parks and recognized the growing need to preserve special places in British Columbia. In 1938, Gray and his Chief Forester, Ernest Manning, created Tweedsmuir Provincial Park in the Coast Mountains near Bella Coola, and Hamber Provincial Park in the Rocky Mountains. In 1939, a forest ranger near Clearwater, Bill Noble, recommended a park and on November 28, 1939, an Order-in-Council was approved, creating a huge park around most of the drainage basin of the Clearwater River. The park was named for Gray (Wells was his nickname). In 1941, he and Manning were working on establishing a new park in British Columbia's Cascade Mountains when Manning was killed in a plane crash; that park ended up being named E.C. Manning Provincial Park.

In 1940, just after the park was created, Chess Lyons (namesake of Mount Lyons) and his assistant, Huntley Campbell (namesake of Mount Huntley/Huntley Col) thoroughly surveyed the park and produced a detailed report with photos. Lyons and Campbell are responsible for about a quarter of its current place names, all carefully researched to remember settlers, prospectors, explorers, forest rangers, and other people who had lived and worked in the Clearwater Valley. The original park included the Pendleton Lakes in the west but not Trophy Mountain or the Flourmill Volcanoes. In 1986, the Pendleton Lakes were eliminated from the park while the later two areas were added to the park.

In 2018 Sarlacc's Pit cave was discovered in the park. Notable for its size, the entrance pit measures some 100m x 60m, and a 61m waterfall on the pit wall is fed by snowpack and glacier meltwater. This stream emerges 2 km east and flows into Ovis Creek.

=== Clearwater River dams ===
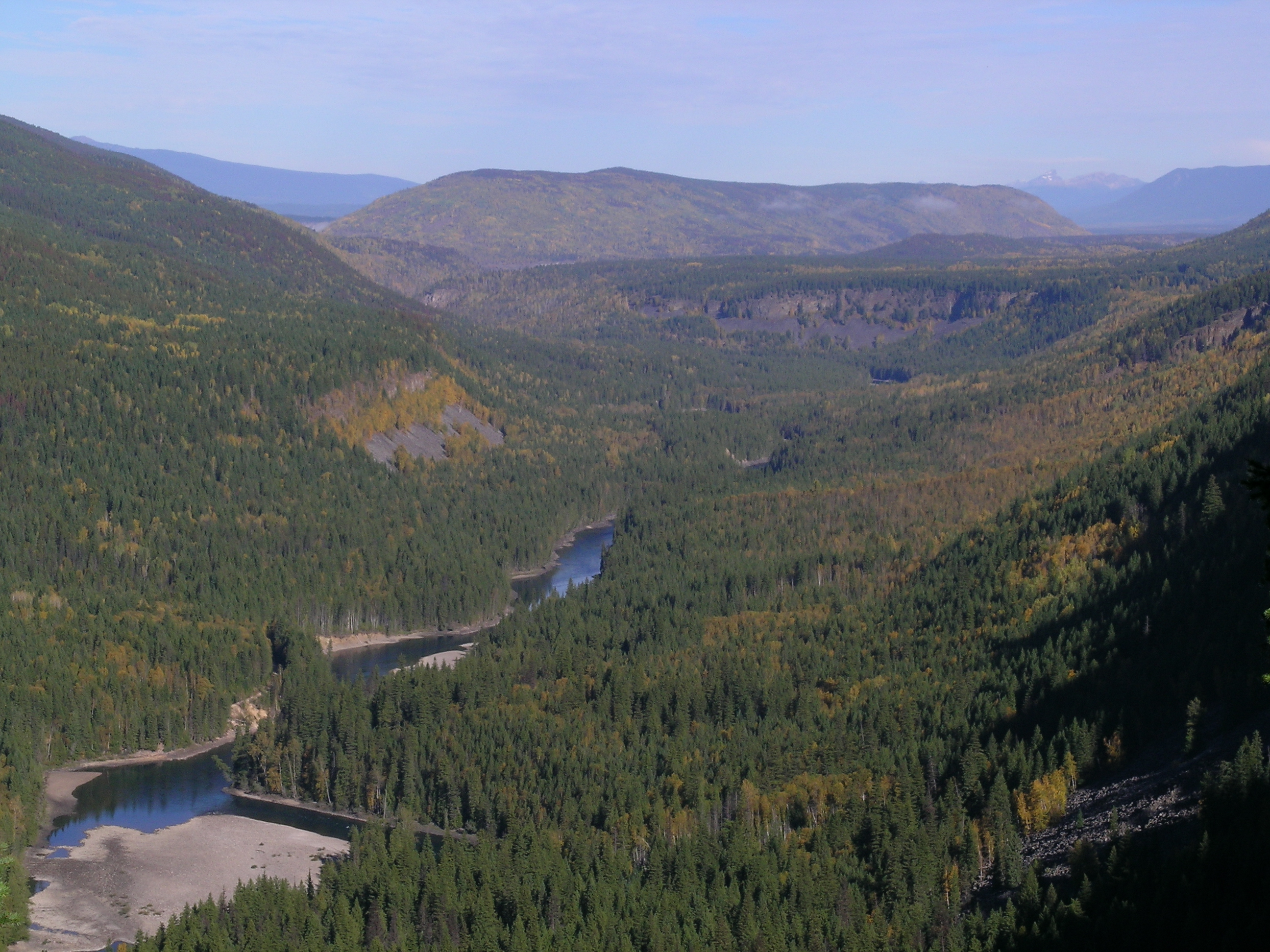
The Clearwater River valley, taken from Clearwater Valley Overlook

The disastrous Fraser River flood of 1948 nearly changed the Clearwater River and Wells Gray Park. In November 1947, prior to the flood, the Federal Minister of Public Works had proposed the creation of a joint federal-provincial committee to study the Fraser River's water resources. The flood in the following spring made this project more urgent, and in late 1948 the Dominion-Provincial Board Fraser River Basin was established to report on power generation, fisheries, flood control, water supply and recreation. Between 1949 and 1954, the committee of ten collected data and filled in the gaps in other government studies. No report was produced, but in 1953, 12 detailed maps of the Clearwater River between Hemp Creek and the North Thompson River were published. These had a scale of 1 inch to 500 feet, and a contour interval of 20 feet. As of 2023, these sheets are still the most detailed and accurate topographic maps available of the lower Clearwater, although they are out-of-date regarding human developments.

The Fraser River committee proposed two dams, one just upstream from Clearwater and one at Sabre Tooth Rapids. In 1955, the federal and provincial governments replaced this committee with a smaller one with only four members, the Fraser River Board, and directed it to determine what development of the Fraser River's water resources would be feasible, particularly regarding flood control and hydro-electric power. The Board published two preliminary reports, one about flood control in 1956, and one about hydro-electric developments in 1958.

The idea of developing hydro power from the Clearwater River and its tributaries was not new to the Fraser River Board. In 1918, Helmcken Falls was studied as a source of power for Kamloops, but the needed transmission lines were prohibitively long. In the late 1940s, the Aluminum Company of Canada examined the power potential of Helmcken Falls, but chose Kitimat instead, thereby flooding northern Tweedsmuir Park instead of Wells Gray. In 1959, a comprehensive development of the Murtle River was proposed by the British Columbia Power Commission.

These proposals paled in comparison to the final report of the Fraser River Board, issued in 1963. Although dams were proposed elsewhere such as on the Cariboo and McGregor Rivers and at the Grand Canyon of the Fraser, the Clearwater River attracted most of the attention with seven dams and five reservoirs recommended. The dams would be located 4 km (2.5 mi) upstream from the North Thompson confluence, at the lower end of Granite Canyon, at Sabre Tooth Rapids, near Myanth Falls (upper and lower dams), at the outlet of Hobson Lake and on the low pass between Hobson and Quesnel Lakes. Together, these dams would turn the Clearwater River into a 160 km long (100-mile long) series of reservoirs extending nearly to its glacial source above Hobson Lake. Each dam would back water almost to the foot of the next one, similar to the Columbia River today which has little free-flowing water. The dam at Sabre Tooth Rapids would be the highest at 137 m (449 ft), flooding most of Helmcken Canyon, inundating Sylvia and Goodwin Falls, and submerging the bottom 10 m (33 ft) of Helmcken Falls. The plan for Baileys Chute envisaged two dams; the lower dam at Myanth Falls would divert the river into a 1.7 km (1.1 mi) power canal ending at Baileys Chute. Collectively, the proposal (including the other rivers) was called System E and the cost of construction was estimated at $398,503,500.

There was little reaction to the Fraser River Board's report. The public was not too concerned about losing remote preserves such as Wells Gray Park, when British Columbia had so much wilderness land. The park may have been saved because the British Columbia government was preoccupied in the 1960s with planning and building (and paying for) the W.A.C. Bennett Dam on the Peace River and Mica Dam, Keenleyside Dam and Duncan Dam, all part of the Columbia River Treaty projects.

In 1971, BC Hydro, the provincial power utility, revived the Fraser River Board's report and took a new look at the feasibility and costs of building the seven dams on the Clearwater River. In just a decade, the environmental movement had gained power and credibility in the province, and BC Hydro's interest in the Clearwater quickly caught the attention of the Shuswap-Thompson River Research and Development Association (STRRADA) and the newly formed Yellowhead Ecological Association based in Clearwater, BC. One of the undertakings was to offer bus tours of Wells Gray Park during the summer of 1972. The tours stopped at viewpoints where the volunteer guides urged passengers to imagine how the valley would look when flooded by the dams. The strategy was effective and succeeded in creating an uproar of protest about the dams. Within a year, the plan to dam the Clearwater River was quietly shelved, but BC Hydro retained its water rights until 1987 when the flooding reserve on the Clearwater was cancelled.

== Natural history ==
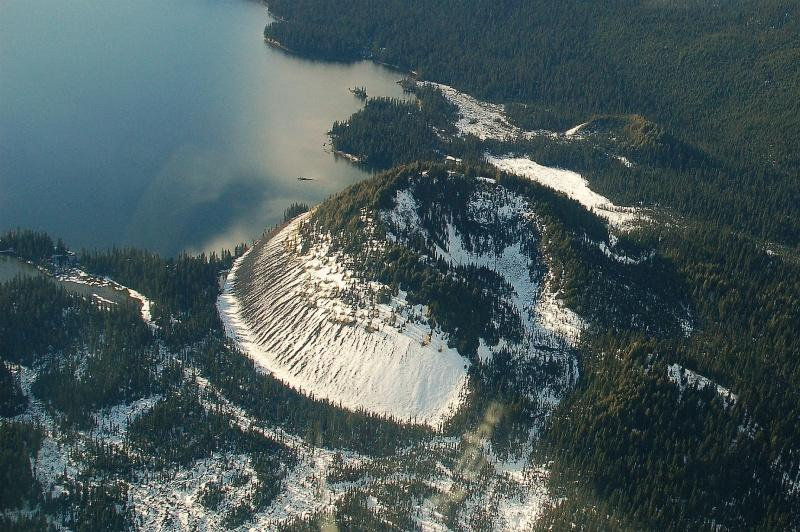
Kostal volcano

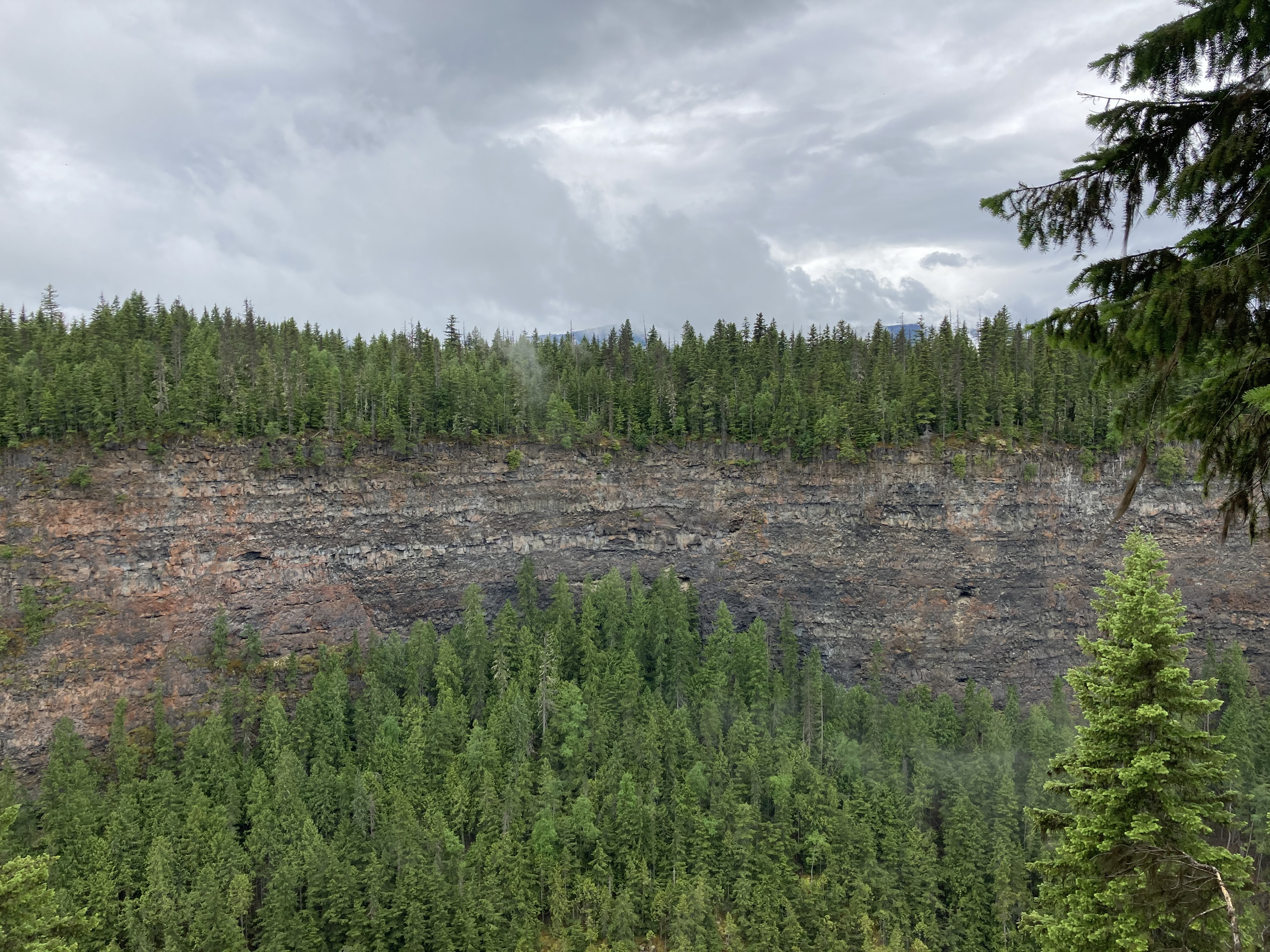
Rock formations on the rims of the Helmcken Canyon

Wells Gray Park is bordered on every side by different types of terrain which merge within the boundaries to give the Park its splendid diversity. According to Tom Dickinson, Professor Emeritus at Thompson Rivers University, Wells Gray hosts about 1,050 species of trees, shrubs, and flowers; more than 1,000 species of lichens, several important for wildlife, especially mountain caribou; about 200 species of mushrooms; at least 275 species of mosses and liverworts; 15 species of fish; 56 species of mammals; 5 species of amphibians; 3 species of reptiles; over 275 species of birds with at least 75 being listed as rare or very rare; and several thousand species of invertebrates, including dragonflies, moths, butterflies, and mosquitoes. A variety of factors enrich/have enriched the Park; these include the 1926 forest fire, the proximity of the Fraser Plateau westward, the Cariboo Mountains northeastward, the interior wet belt eastward, and the semi-desert zone to the south. Within the Park, micro-climates, altitude, soil type, and availability of water all have their effects and contribute to the existence of this variety of plant and animal life.

== Wildlife ==
This park is home to various birds as well as the mammalian species of grizzly bear, white-tailed deer, beaver, moose, mule deer, black bear and timber wolf.

== Climate ==
Winters in the Clearwater Valley are severe, with an average of 1 m (3.3 ft) of accumulated snow at lower elevations and much more higher up. Snow may linger along the low elevation roads until mid-April and never completely disappears from the north sides of the mountains. Early May and most of June are often rainy and, during the summer, storms occur about once a week. Average annual precipitation at Clearwater is 43 cm (17 in) and this increases as one travels north into the park and closer to the mountains. Clearwater Lake receives over 60 cm (24 in) and Azure Lake about 80 cm (31 in). Summer temperatures in the Clearwater Valley are often in the mid-20s Celsius, but may reach 30 degrees, and vary considerably according to altitude. September through mid-October usually features clear warm days, cool nights and colourful fall foliage.

== Access ==
There are five roads that provide access to Wells Gray Park.

- Clearwater Valley Road (commonly called Wells Gray Park Road). It starts from the Yellowhead Highway in Clearwater and ends at Clearwater Lake, 68 km (42.3 mi) north. Almost all visitors to the park use this road. Three of the park's four campgrounds are along this road. The park's best known attractions are reached via Clearwater Valley Road: Spahats Falls, Clearwater Valley Overlook, Trophy Mountain, Moul Falls, Battle Mountain, The Flatiron, Green Mountain, Dawson Falls, The Mushbowl, Helmcken Falls, Ray Farm, Baileys Chute and Clearwater Lake. The road is paved for the first 42.2 km (26.2 mi) to the Helmcken junction, then it becomes a good gravel road.
- Clearwater River Road. It starts in Clearwater and hugs the west bank of the Clearwater River north for 37.9 km (23.5 mi) to the confluence of the Mahood River. Attractions are The Kettle, Sabre Tooth Rapids, White Horse Bluff, and Sylvia and Goodwin Falls on the Mahood River. This road is used for river access by Clearwater's three rafting companies. The road is rough and maintained by its users, and a high-clearance vehicle is recommended. Between 1964, when the road was constructed, and 1975, when logging ceased in this area of the park, the road bridged the Mahood and continued for 27 km (16.8 mi) along the west flanks of the Clearwater River, where it terminated at the Flourmill Volcanoes. On July 2, 2020, the road washed out at 11.4 km (7.1 mi), opposite Spahats Creek, rendering the remaining 27 km (17 mi) to the end of the road at the Mahood River impassable by vehicle. Many volunteers and two local logging companies, Dale Miller Logging and Wadlegger Logging, stepped up to temporarily repair the road, but work couldn't get underway until April 2021, nine months after the washout, due to a lack of permits. When work began, it was quickly discovered that the damage was more extensive than initially believed - beyond the scope of volunteer repairs. During 2021 and 2022, alternate routes to the Clearwater River were discussed and engineers studied the washout. A proposal for building retaining walls at a cost of $1.1 million has been submitted to the Minister of Transportation, but no decision has been made as of April 2023. The event has hit Clearwater's tourism and recreation industry hard, as the road was very popular with campers, anglers, and used by three whitewater rafting companies - Interior Whitewater Expeditions, Liquid Lifestyles, and Riverside Adventures. Interior Whitewater Expeditions (IWE) has had to cancel all overnight trips, with their only trips now being on the lower part of the river - from the put-in points below the washout. As a result of the washout, IWE cancelled 100 overnight trips in summer 2021 and laid off nearly half of their workforce.
- Mahood Lake Road. It starts from Highway 24 between 100 Mile House on Highway 97 and Little Fort on Highway 5. From the latter, it is 127.7 km (79.3 mi) to the end at Deception Point on Mahood Lake. There is a 37-unit campground at Mahood Lake. Attractions are Canim Falls, Mahood Lake beaches and Deception Falls. Most of the road is gravel.
- Murtle Lake Road. It starts at Blue River on the Yellowhead Highway and climbs for 27 km (16.8 mi) to the pass. A short trail, designed for portaging canoes or kayaks, goes the rest of the way to Murtle Lake. Murtle is North America's largest paddle-only lake. The road is rough and high-clearance vehicles are recommended but not essential.
- Flourmill Volcanoes Road. It starts at 100 Mile House on Highway 97. There is no signage to help at the many junctions; refer to Exploring Wells Gray Park for directions. The road is 97.1 km (60.3 mi) long, mostly gravel and dirt. From the end of the road, it is a hike of 3.7 km (2.3 mi) to the lava flow.

== Attractions ==
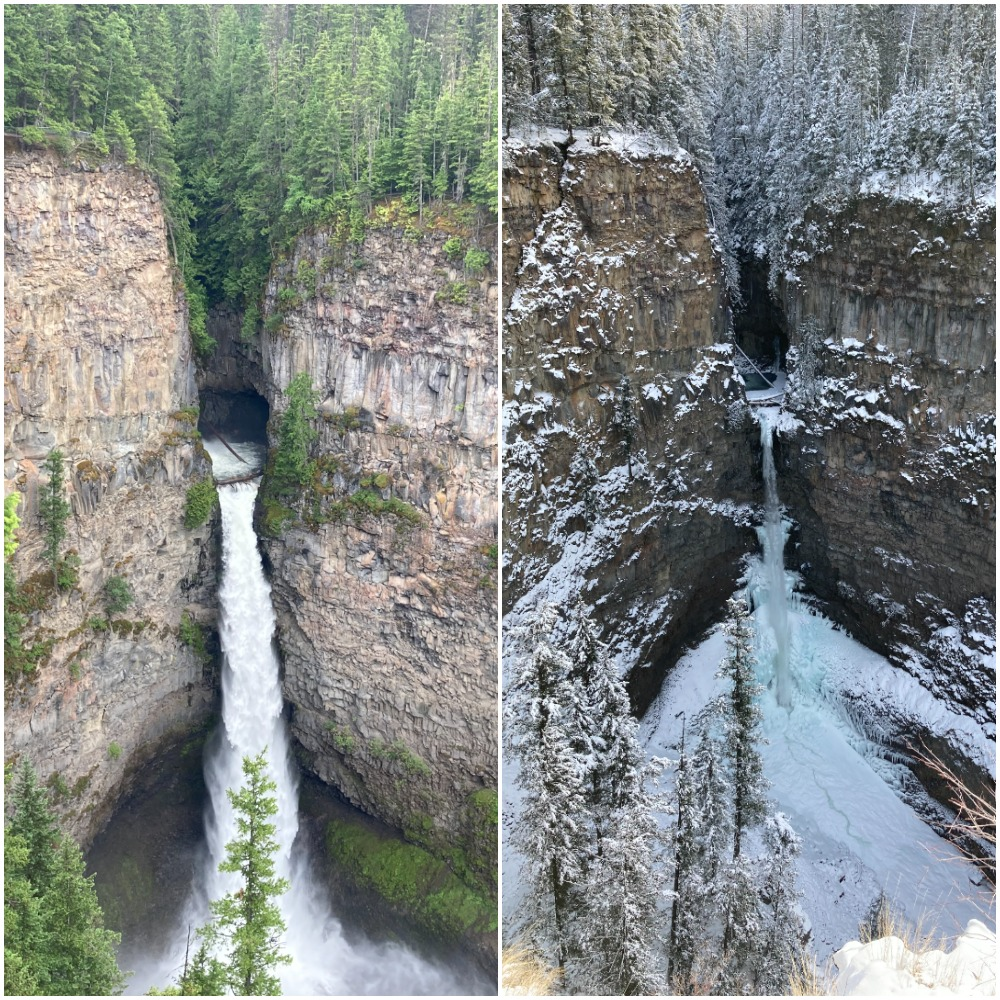
Spahats Falls in the summer (L) and in the winter (R)

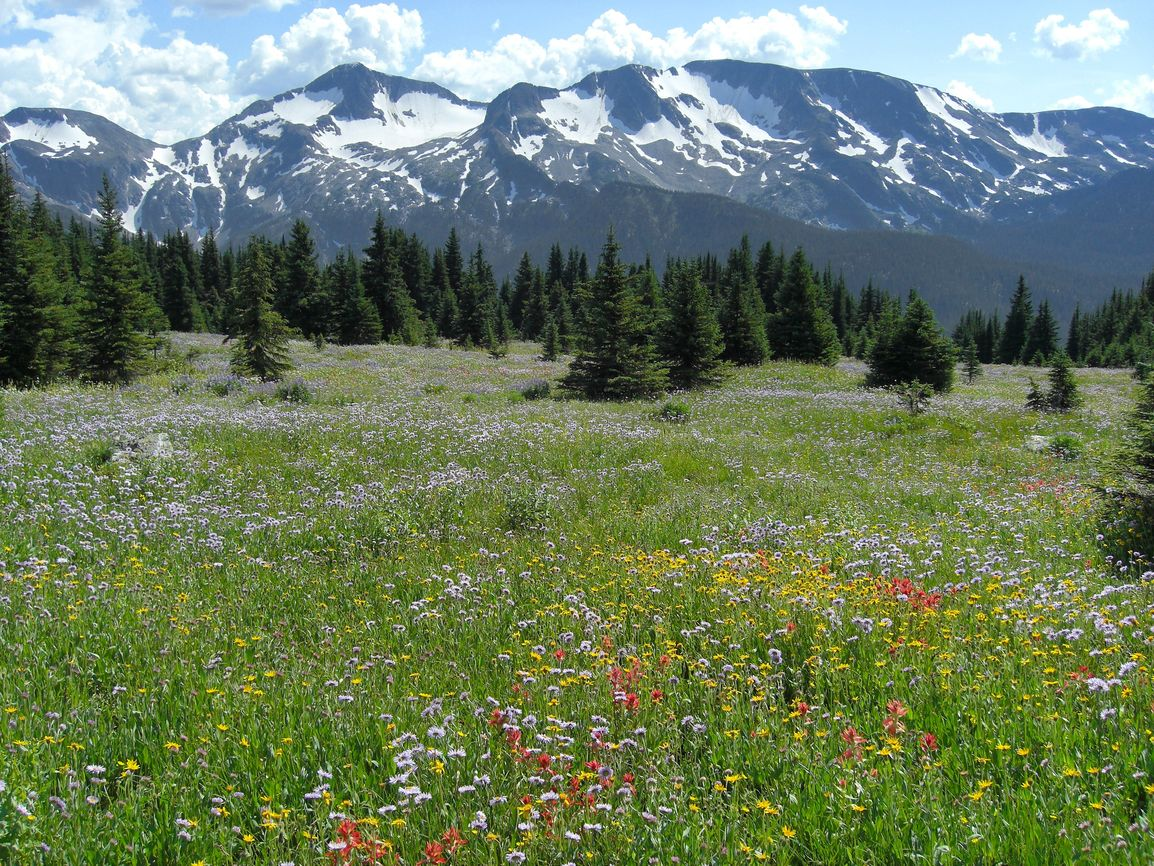
Table Mountain meadows and Trophy Mountain

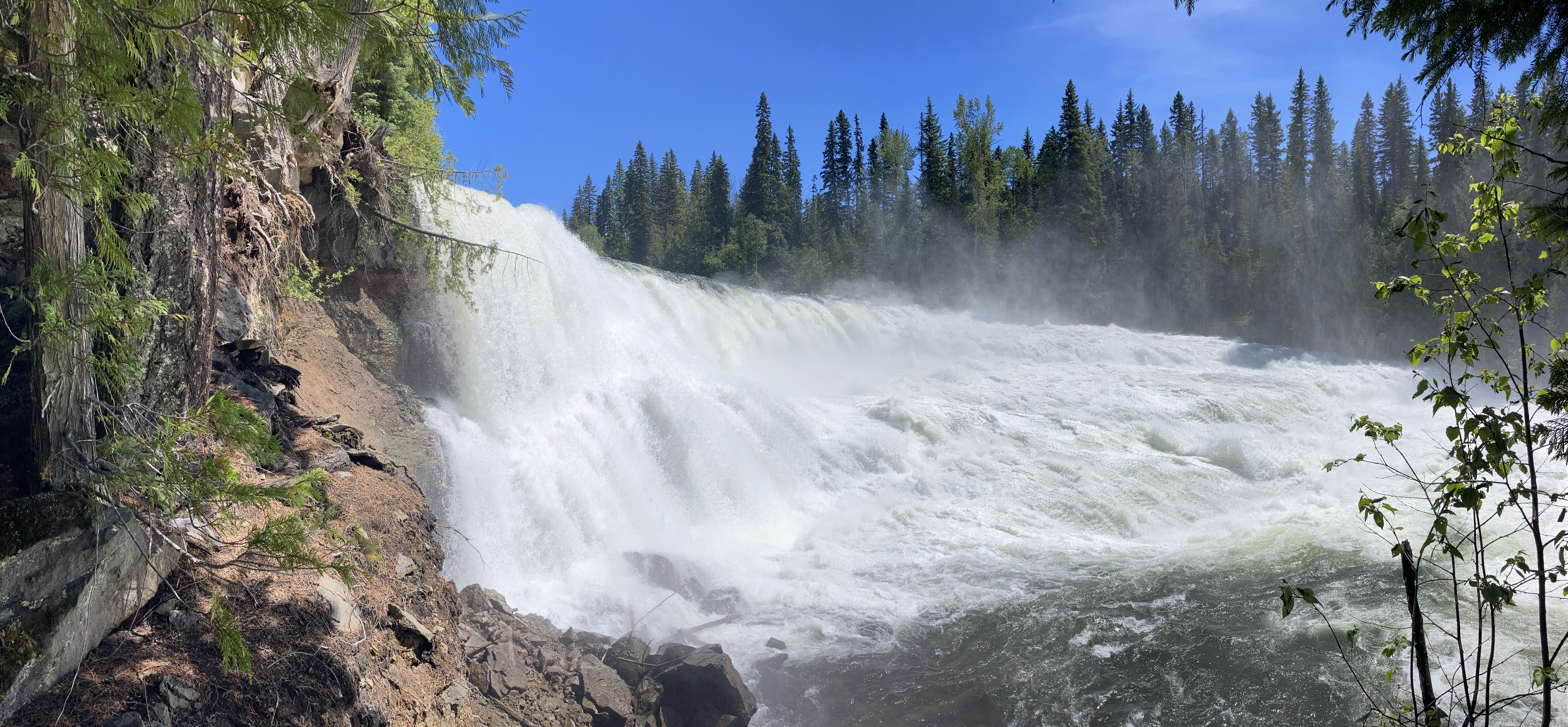
Dawson Falls, viewed from the north bank of the Murtle River

The park is popular from mid-May through mid-October. Campgrounds are open and serviced from late May to mid-September. The park is open year-round, but in winter the Clearwater Valley Road is plowed only as far as Helmcken Falls. Following are the park's major attractions:

- Helmcken Falls is the park's main tourist draw. The waterfall is Canada's fourth highest with a vertical drop of 141 m (463 ft). A road leads to a viewing platform on the north side of the canyon and a trail goes to south side and the brink. In winter, an ice cone forms which sometimes grows halfway up the falls if it is very cold and snowy.
- Spahats Falls is a 75 m (246 ft) tall waterfall on Spahats Creek where it drops into the Granite Canyon of the Clearwater River.
- Trophy Mountain is on the south edge of Wells Gray Park and consists of nine summits. The meadows bloom in late June and again in late July to early August. There are many hiking trails and routes in the meadows and on the peaks.
- Third Canyon has sidewalks on both sides of the road bridge for safe viewing of two waterfalls on the upstream side and an 80 m (262 ft) deep gorge on the downstream side.
- Moul Falls on Grouse Creek is 35 m (115 ft) high. It is one of the park's most popular short hikes and it is the only waterfall that hikers can go behind.
- Green Mountain has a road to the top. A viewing tower provides a panorama of southern Wells Gray Park.
- Dawson Falls is on the Murtle River 5 km (3.1 mi) upstream from Helmcken Falls. It is 20 m (66 ft) high and 90 m (295 ft) wide.
- The Mushbowl is a narrow canyon downstream from Dawson Falls. The Clearwater Valley Road bridges the Murtle River here. Some of Wells Gray Park's oldest rocks are seen here.
- Ray Farm is an abandoned homestead. John Ray lived here from 1911 to 1947. He married Alice Ludtke in 1932 and they raised three children in the wilderness, Nancy, Douglas and Robert.
- Bailey's Chute is a low waterfall on the Clearwater River. In late summer and fall, salmon can be seen trying to jump the falls. A continuation of this trail goes to Marcus Falls, Myanth Falls and West Lake.
- Clearwater Lake is the end of the Clearwater Valley Road. Two large campgrounds are located here. Osprey Falls is a low waterfall that the lake empties over to become the Clearwater River. Boat tours, boat rentals and a public boat launching are available here and allow access deeper into Wells Gray Park via Clearwater Lake and Azure Lake.
- Murtle Lake is a wilderness lake in the southeast part of the park. See access section above.
- Canim Falls is in the far western end of the park, reached by Mahood Lake Road. The Canim River flows over a lava cliff that is 25 m (82 ft) high.
- Mahood Lake is reached from the west via Mahood Lake Road. A campground and beach are at the west end of the lake. The lake is 21 km (13.0 mi) long.

=== Waterfalls ===
Wells Gray Park bears the nickname "Canada's Waterfalls Park" because 42 named waterfalls are found within its boundaries. There are actually many more if the numerous creeks that cascade down the mountainsides are included, but the following table lists the named waterfalls.

Waterfall Name	Height in metres	Location
Allison	15	Philip Creek below Philip Lake
Are	15	Philip Creek above confluence with Trout Creek
Baileys Chute	10	Clearwater River above The Horseshoe
Candle Creek	10	Candle Creek near Clearwater River
Canim	25	Canim River between Canim and Mahood Lakes
Chain Meadows	30	Chain Meadows Creek above Clearwater Lake
Coal Creek	40	Coal Creek in the Hemp Canyonlands
Cougar	20	Cougar Creek falling into Helmcken Canyon
Crystal	30	Unnamed creek flowing into north side of Azure Lake
Dawson	20	Murtle River
Deception	50	Deception Creek above Mahood Lake
Fage	30	Fage Creek near Clearwater River
Falls Creek	4	Confluence of Falls Creek and Clearwater River
Garnet	30	Garnet Creek above Azure Lake
Goodwin	10	Mahood River below Sylvia Falls
Helmcken	141	Murtle River
Hemp	8	Hemp Creek west of The Flatiron
Horseshoe	6 and 10	Murtle River
Ida	20	Third Canyon Creek near Buck Hill
Lifely	10	Unnamed creek flowing into east side of Clearwater Lake
Ludtke	30	Unnamed creek, north shore of Azure Lake
Mahood	20	Unnamed creek, part of Canim River outflow from Canim Lake
Majerus	12	Murtle River
Marcus	5	Clearwater River above Baileys Chute
McDiarmid	10	Grouse Creek near confluence with Clearwater River
McDougall	14	Murtle River below Murtle Lake
Meadow	8	Murtle River below McDougall Falls
Moul	35	Grouse Creek above confluence with Clearwater River
Mushbowl	5	Murtle River at Clearwater Valley Road bridge
Myanth	3	Clearwater River above Marcus Falls
Osprey	3	Clearwater River at mouth of Clearwater Lake
Rainbow	20	Angus Horne Creek above Azure Lake
Roostertail	10	Unnamed creek flowing into south side of Azure Lake
Second Canyon	15	Second Canyon Creek below Clearwater Valley Road
Silvertip	200	Silvertip Creek above Spahats Creek Road
Spahats	75	Spahats Creek near confluence with Clearwater River
Sticta	10	Falls Creek 1 km upstream from Clearwater River
Sundt	25	Lickskillet Creek near Hobson Lake
Sylvia	20	Mahood River 3.5 km above Clearwater River
Third Canyon	8 and 10	Third Canyon Creek above Clearwater Valley Road
Triple Decker	60	Candle Creek below Clearwater Valley Road

=== Campgrounds ===
Campground name	# of sites	Comments
Wells Gray Golf & RV Park	80	Km 35 Clearwater Valley Road; RV dump, showers, outhouses, running water, small store, golf course, hiking trails, swimming lake, cabins; very popular in July and August but reservations taken at wellsgrayresort.ca
Clearwater Lake	39	Km 65 Clearwater Valley Road; RV dump, showers, outhouses, running water, small store, naturalist talks; very popular in July and August but reservations taken
Falls Creek	41	Km 64.7 Clearwater Valley Road; shares Clearwater Lake's facilities/services; outhouses, running water; very popular in July and August but reservations taken
Pyramid	50	Km 42 Clearwater Valley Road; outhouses, hand-pump for water; seldom full as mosquitoes are abundant
Mahood Lake	37	Near end of Mahood Lake Road; outhouses, running water, playground, boat launching ramp, sandy beach; reservations taken
North Thompson	61	On Yellowhead Highway, 5 km south of Clearwater (not in Wells Gray Park); RV dump, outhouses, running water, playground; reservations taken

== Gallery ==
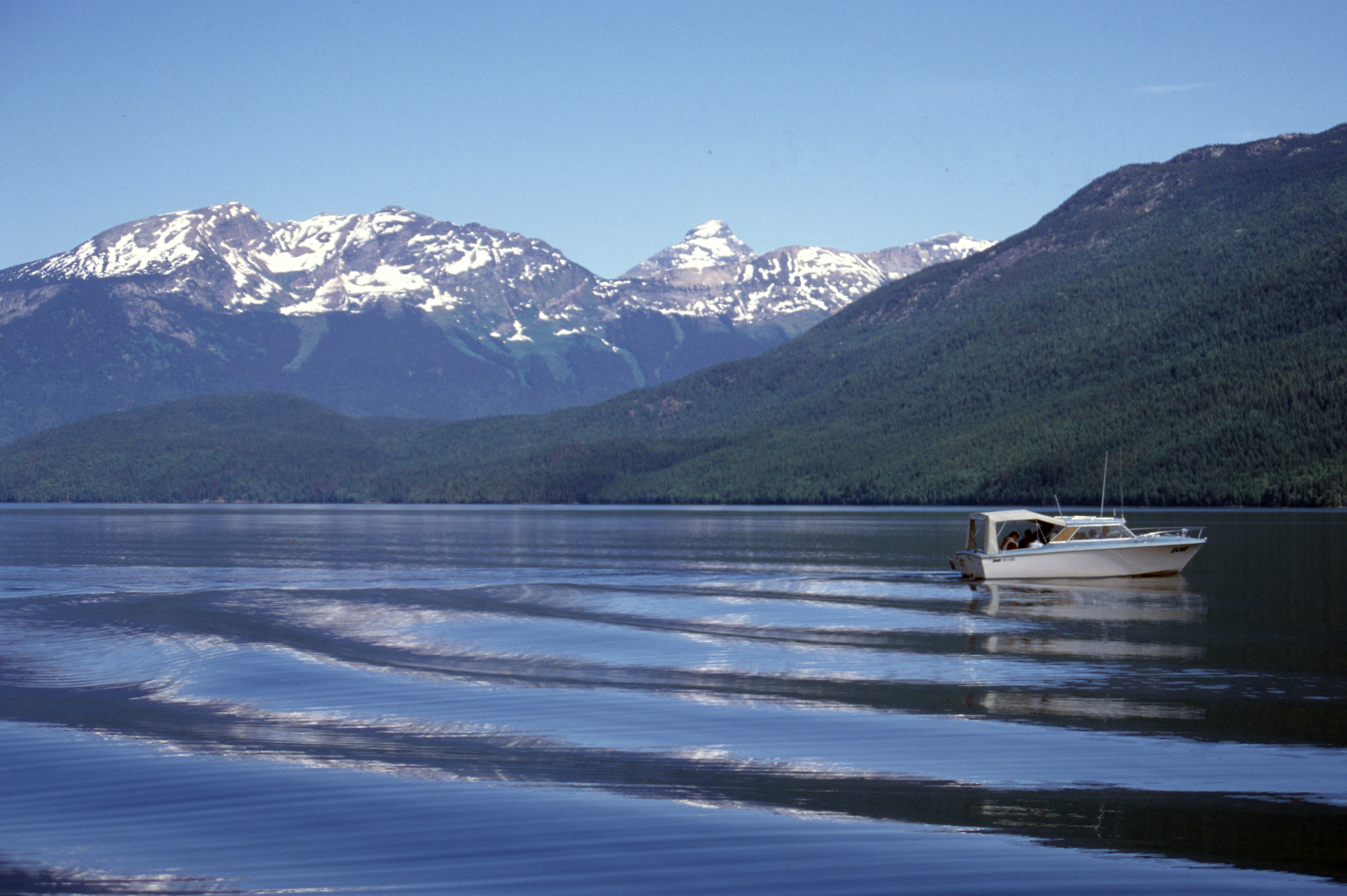
Clearwater Lake and Garnet Peak

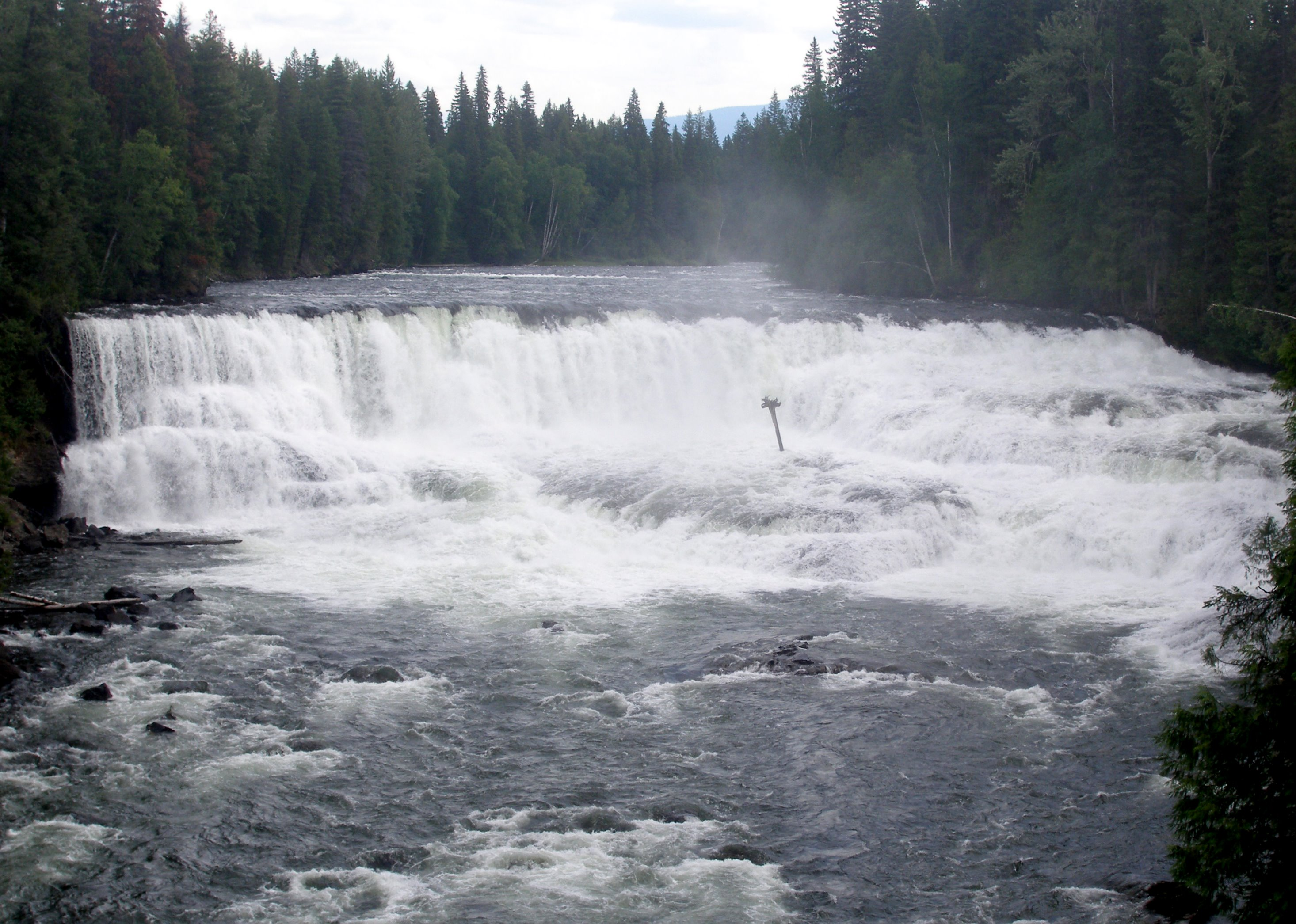
Dawson Falls on the Murtle River

Mount Hugh Neave (centre) from Hobson Glacier

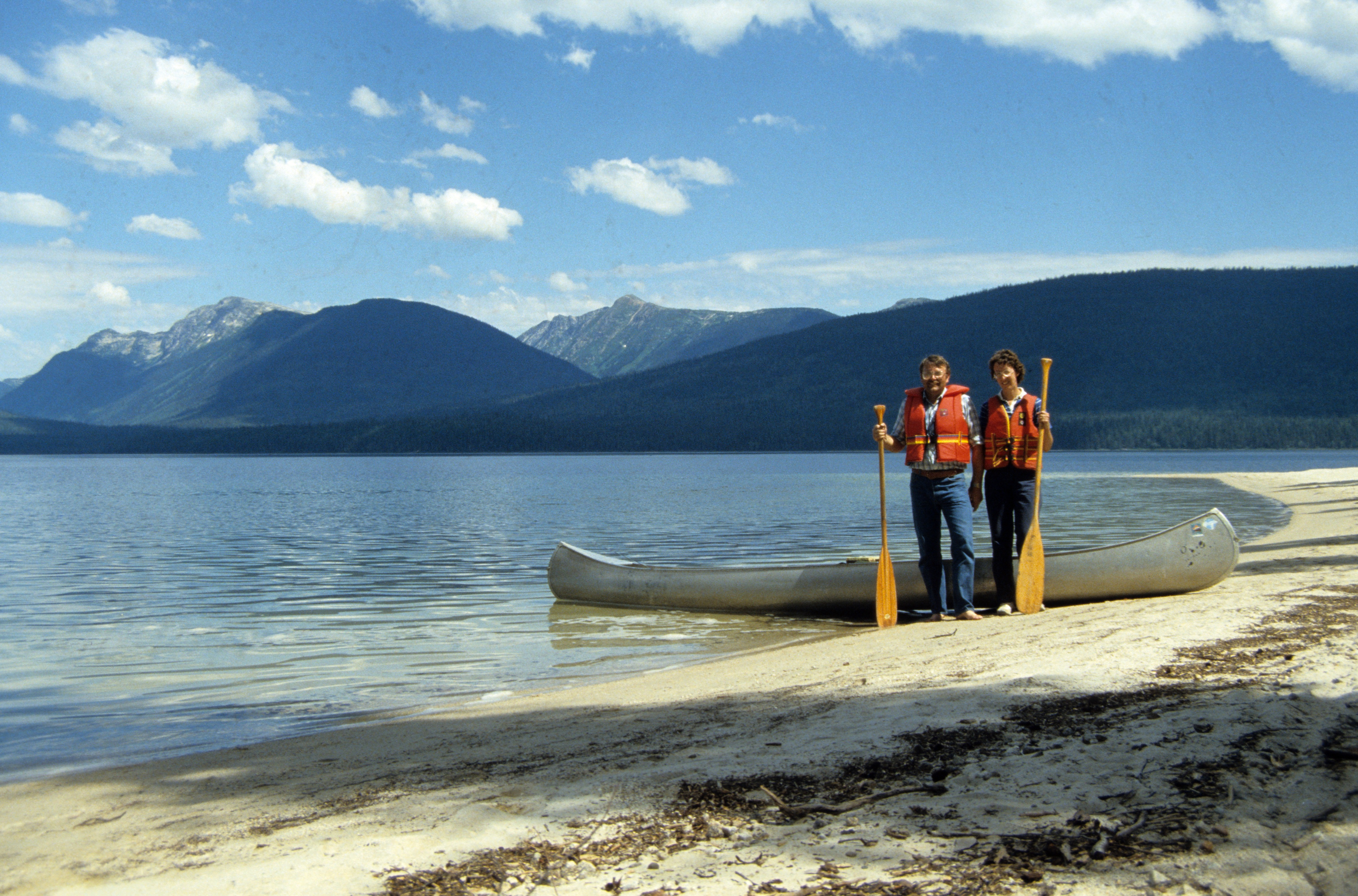
West Arm of Murtle Lake

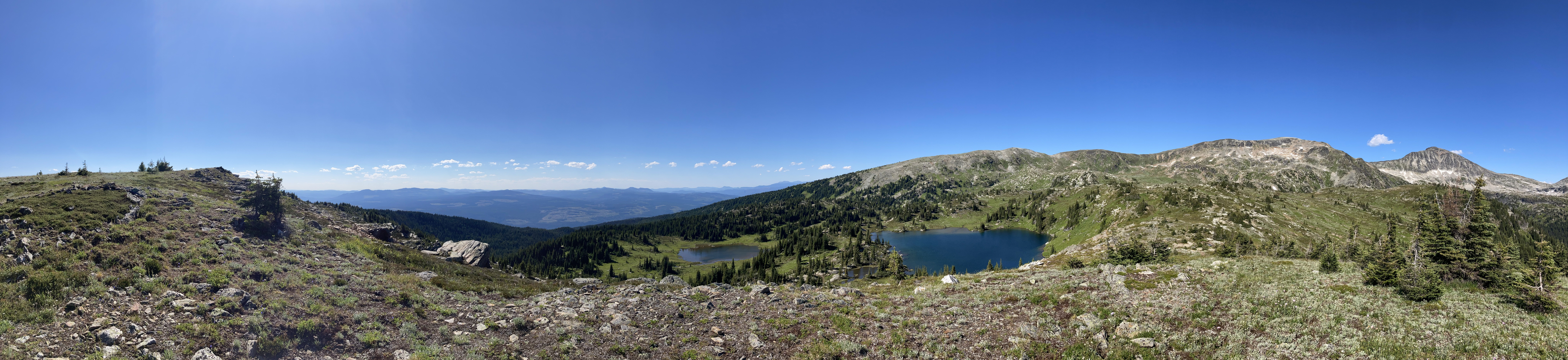
Sheila Lake (R) on Trophy Mountain. Trophy Mountain summit is on far right.

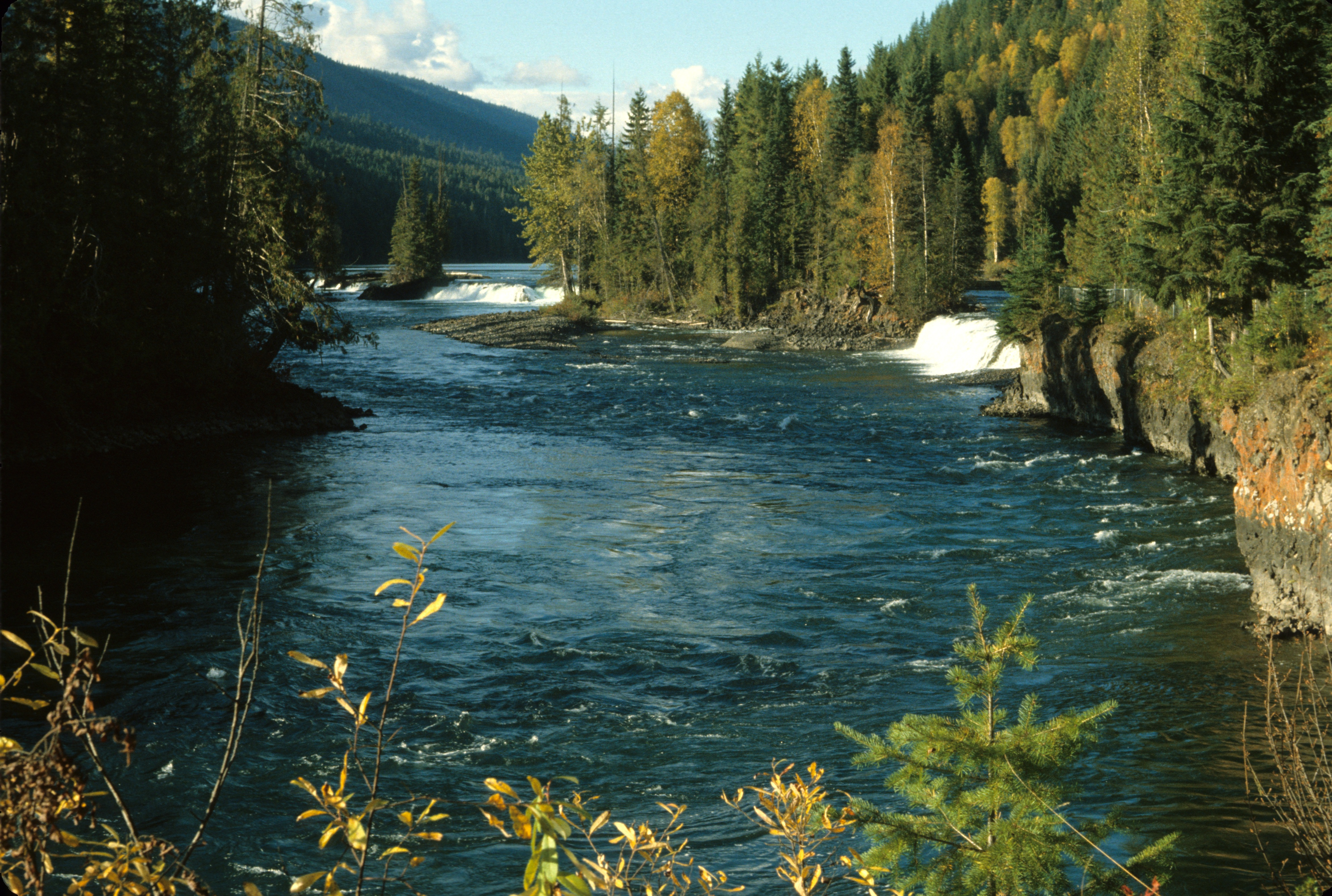
Osprey Falls on Clearwater River

Hikers behind Moul Falls

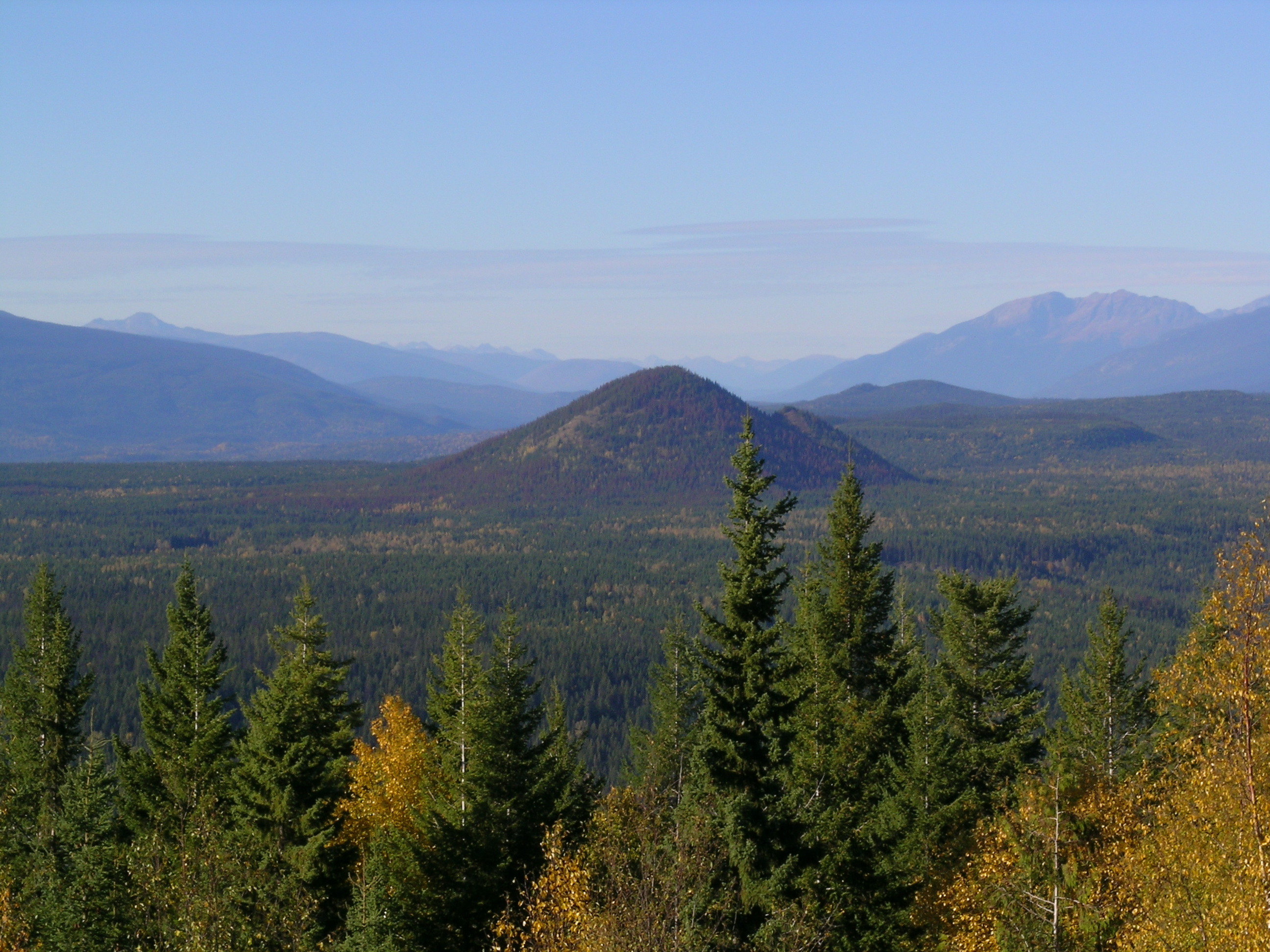
Pyramid Mountain from Green Mountain

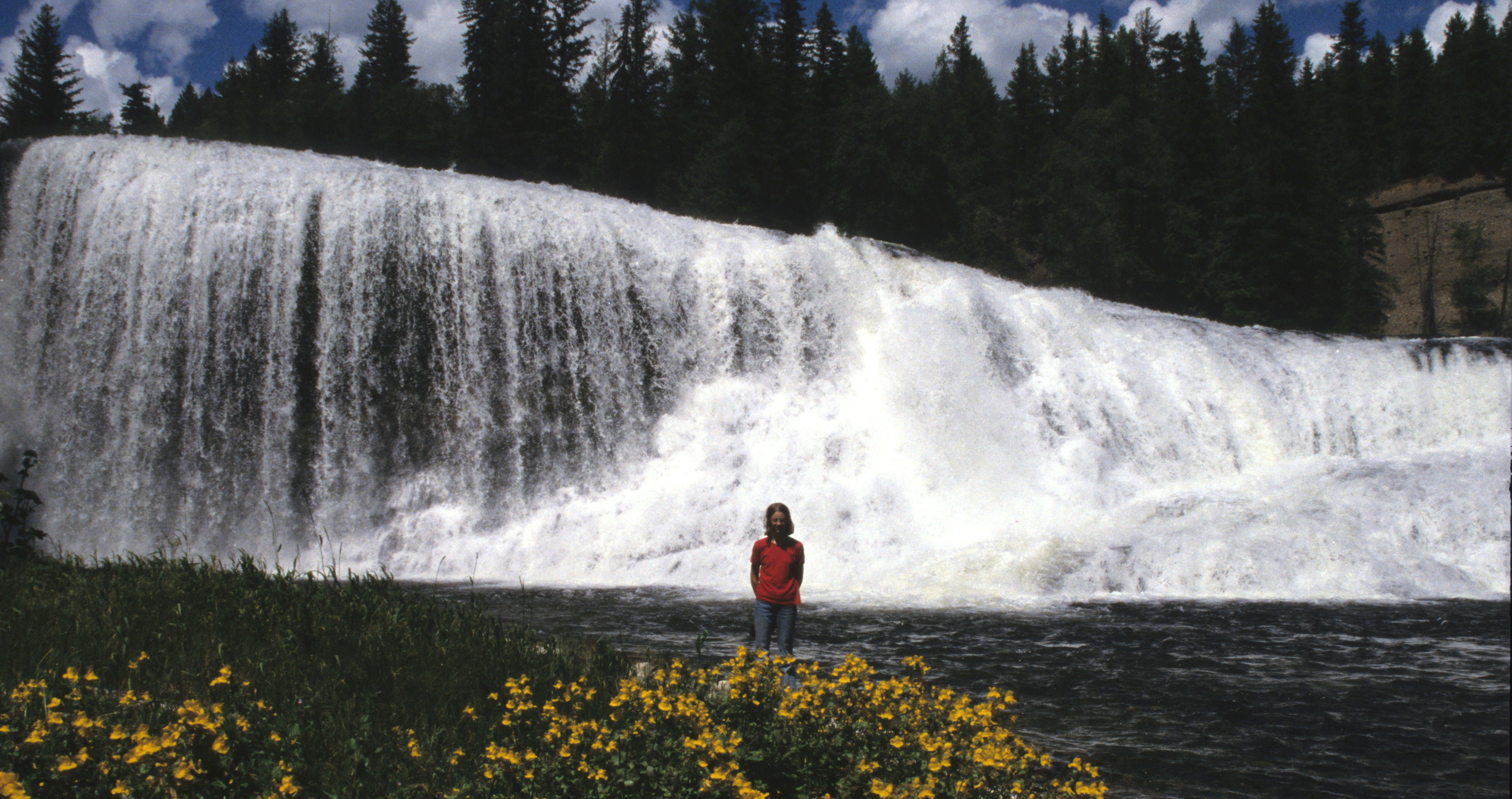
Sylvia Falls on Mahood River

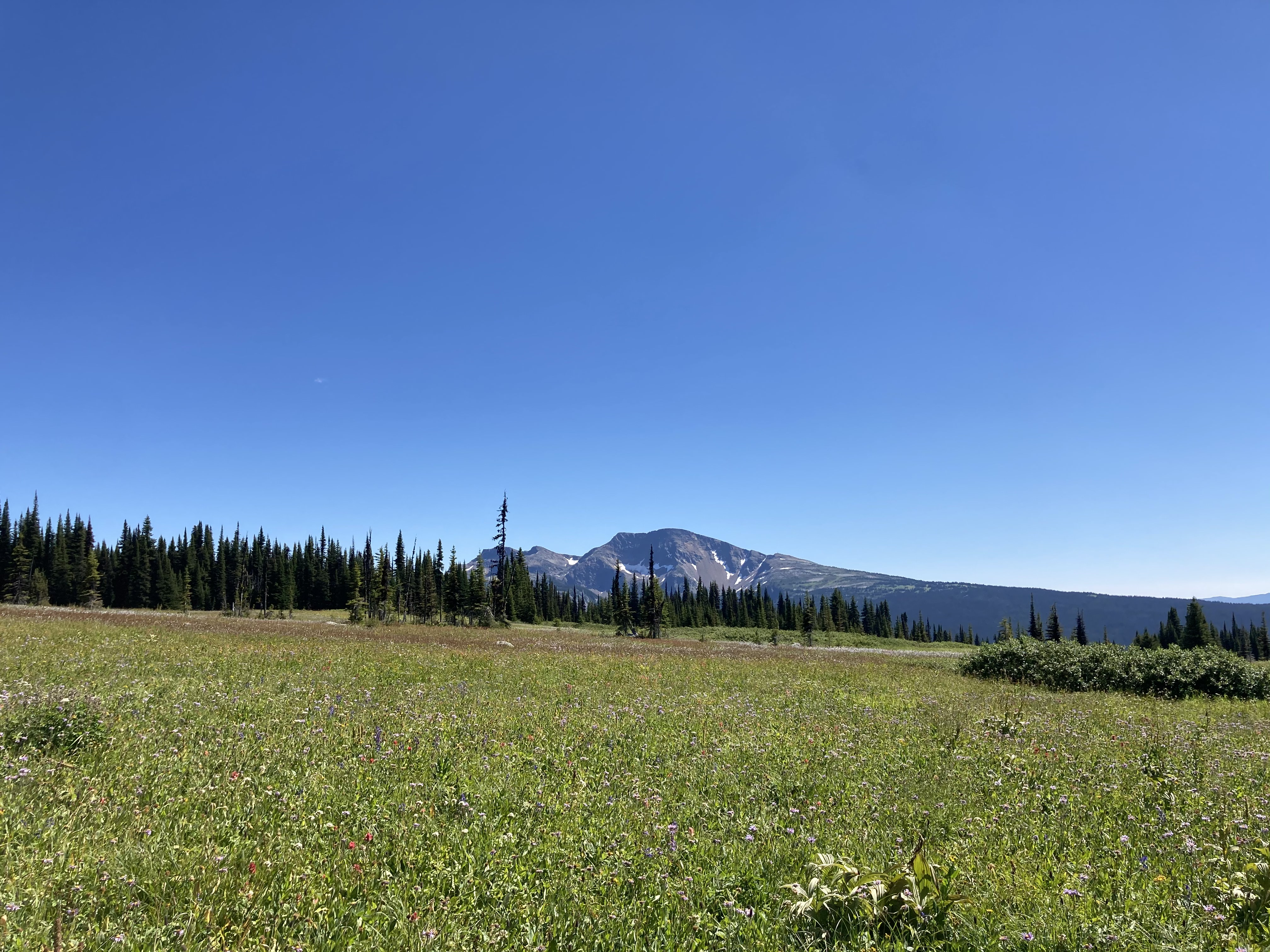
Raft Mountain, taken from the flower meadows of Trophy Mountain

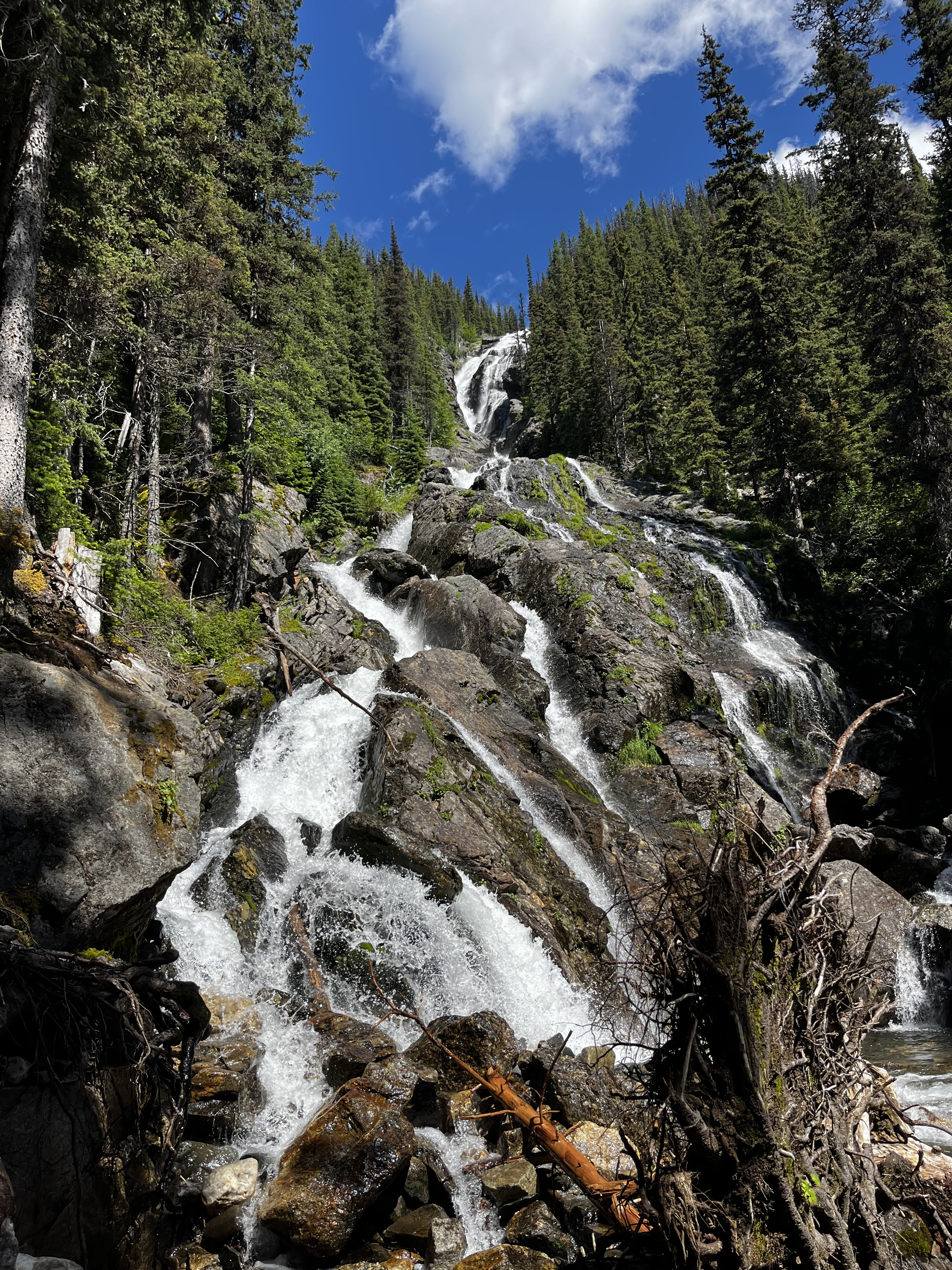
Silvertip Falls, over 200 metres tall

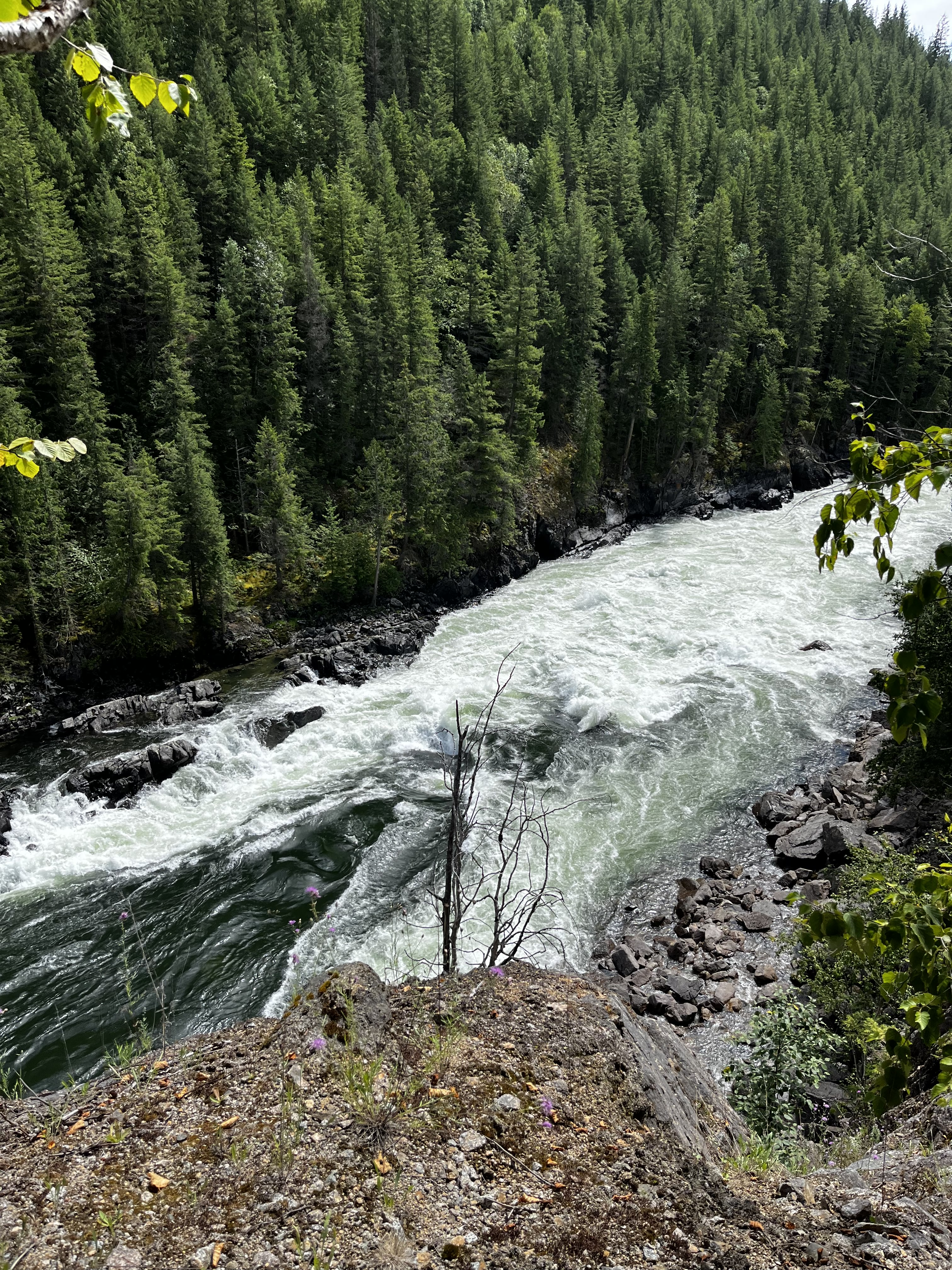
Sabre Tooth Rapids on the Clearwater River

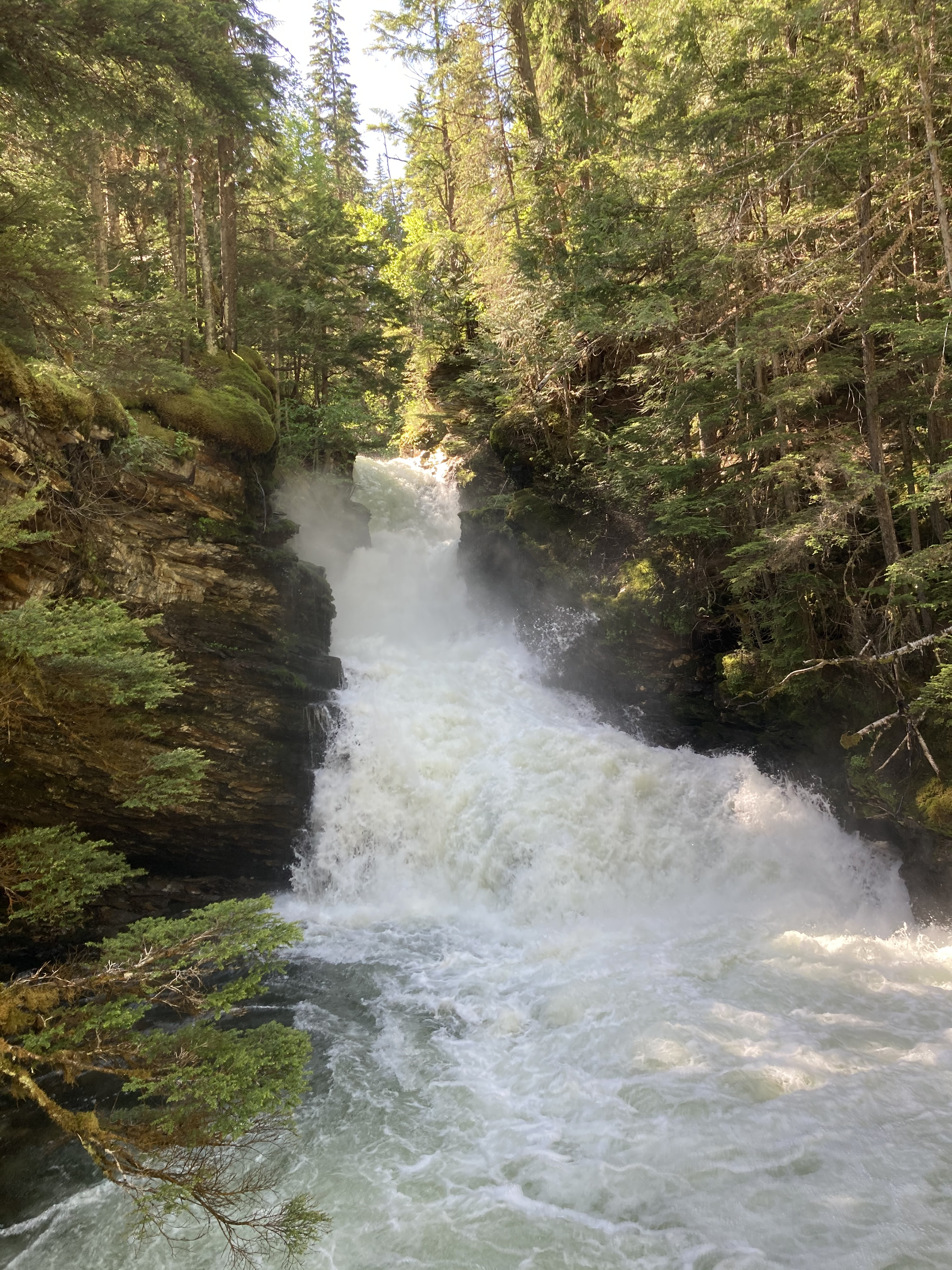
Sticta Falls on Falls Creek

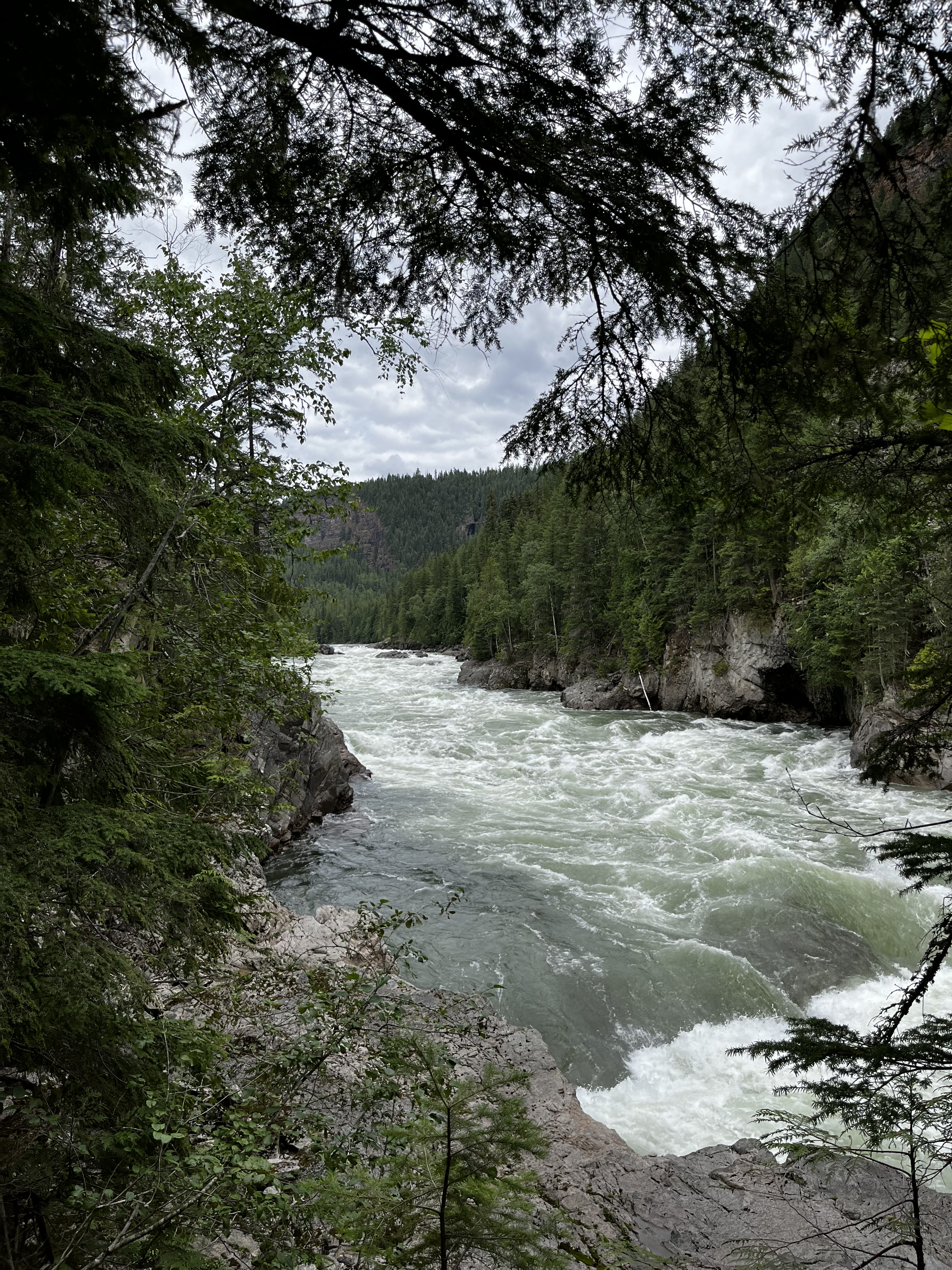
The Kettle on the Clearwater River

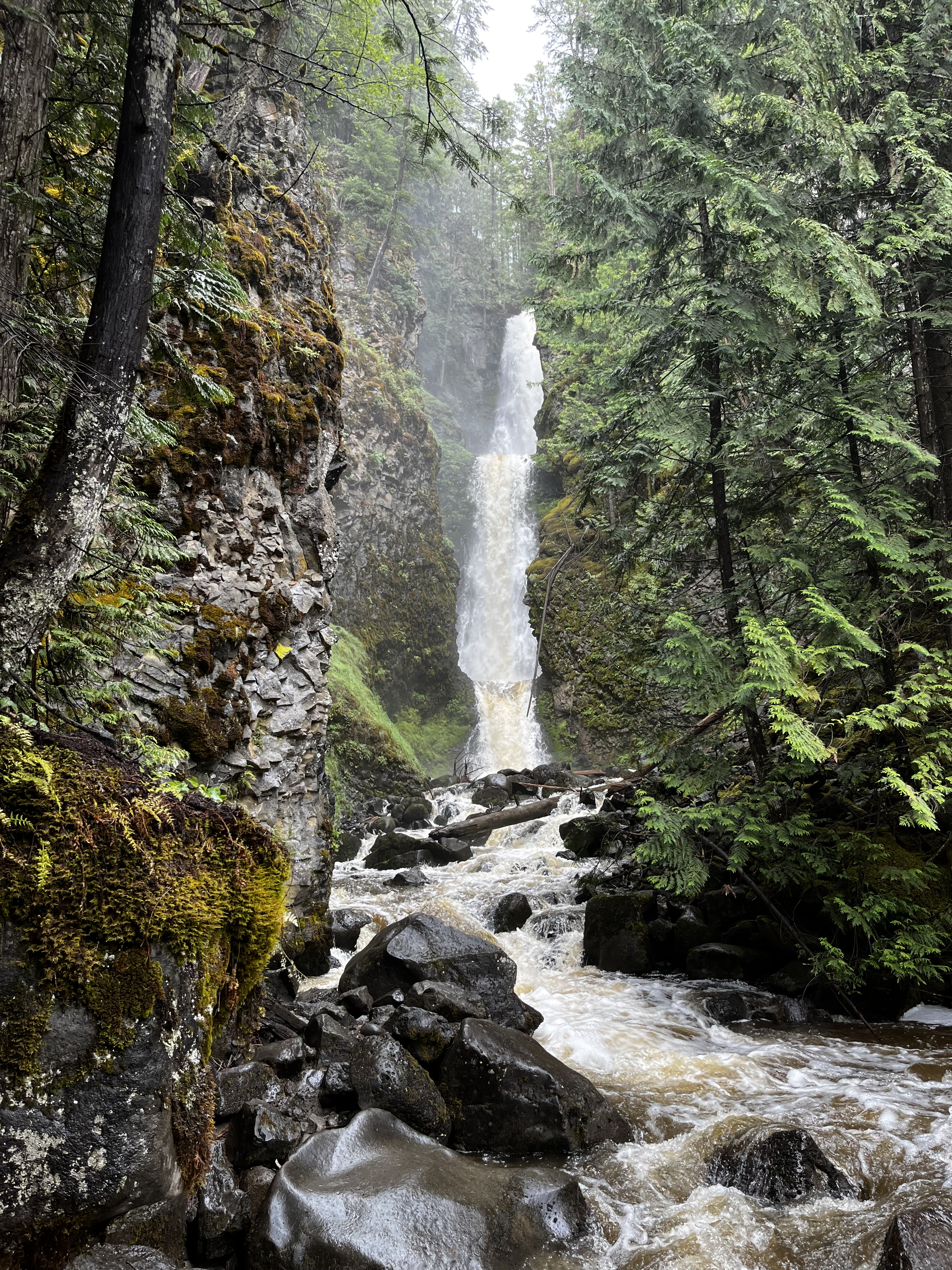
Triple Decker Falls on Candle Creek
