= Schoolhouse Lake Provincial Park =

Provincial park in British Columbia, Canada

Schoolhouse Provincial Park
- IUCN category II (national park)
- Location within British Columbia
- Interactive map of Schoolhouse Provincial Park
- Location: British Columbia, Canada
- Nearest city: Kamloops
- Coordinates: 51°53′04″N 120°59′34″W
- Area: 51.06 km^{2} (19.71 sq mi)
- Established: July 13, 1995
- Governing body: BC Parks

Schoolhouse Lake Provincial Park, formerly known as Lang Lake Provincial Park, is a provincial park in British Columbia, Canada.
