= Canim River =

River in British Columbia, Canada

Coordinates: 51°53′00″N 120°31′00″W

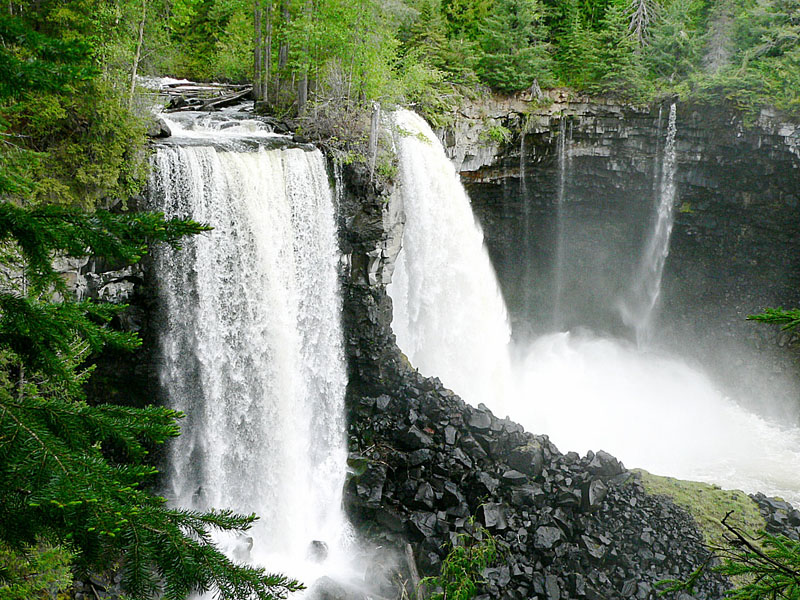
- The Canim Falls

Location
- Country: Canada

The Canim River is a river in the South Cariboo region of the Interior of British Columbia, Canada. It begins at the outlet of Canim Lake and runs 1.8 km (1.1 mi) to Canim Falls, then continues 8 km (5.0 mi) via a canyon cut into a lava plateau to Mahood Lake. A second outlet from Canim Lake, also part of the Canim River, flows over Mahood Falls and joins the Canim Falls branch.

"Canim" means a type of large canoe in the Chinook Jargon. The name was adopted in 1941. Previously, this stream and also Mahood River below Mahood Lake were officially named Bridge Creek.

== See also ==
- List of rivers of British Columbia
- Wells Gray-Clearwater volcanic field
- List of Chinook Jargon placenames
- Canim Beach Provincial Park
