= Tsq̓éscen̓ First Nation =

Government of the Secwepemc Nation, British Columbia, Canada

Tsq̓éscen̓ First Nation Band No. 713 Tsq’escenemc
- Province: British Columbia

Population (January 2022)
- On reserve: 403
- On other land: 21
- Off reserve: 184
- Total population: 608

Tribal Council
- Northern Shuswap Tribal Council

Website
- https://canimlakeband.com/

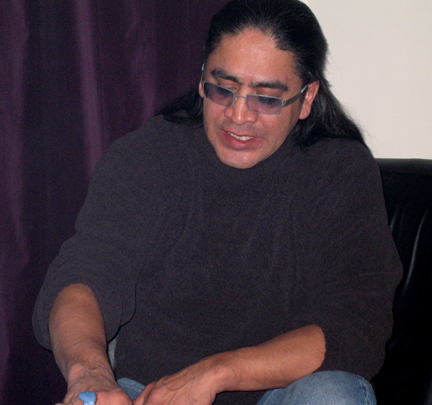
Tsq̓éscen̓ First Nation of Secwepemc Indians and Stlitlimx sculptor, glass artist, fine furniture maker, Ed Archie Noisecat

The Tsq̓éscen̓ First Nation (formerly known as the Canim Lake Band) is a First Nations government of the Secwepemc (Shuswap) Nation, located in the Central Interior region of the Canadian province of British Columbia. Its main Indian reserve is located at Canim Lake, British Columbia, near 100 Mile House. It was created when the government of the then-Colony of British Columbia established an Indian reserve system in the 1860s. It is a member government of the Northern Shuswap Tribal Council.

The Tsq̓éscen̓ First Nation are known in the Shuswap language as the Tsq̓éscen̓emc, "people of broken rock", while their community is known as Tsq̓éscen̓' ("broken rock"). In 2023, the nation reverted to their traditional name of Tsq̓éscen̓ First Nation from the colonial label of Canim Lake Band.

The Tsq̓éscen̓ First Nation has not signed any treaty with any settler-colonial political entity, nor has it ceded any land and let go its territorial claims. As part of the Northern Secwepemc te Qelmucw (Tribal Council), the Tsq̓éscen̓ First Nation has been in negotiation with the government of Canada and the government of British Columbia regarding a final treaty settling this matter. An "Agreement in Principle" was signed in 2018. Once a final agreement is signed between the Tribal Council, Canada, and British Columbia, it is expected that the Indian Reserves will be abolished, the territories under jurisdiction of the Tsq̓éscen̓ First Nation will expand significantly, and former reserves will be absorbed into settlement land under sovereignty of the Tsq̓éscen̓ First Nation.

== Reserves ==
Tsq̓éscen̓ First Nation has the following 6 Indian Reserves under its jurisdiction. As explained before, these reserves were unilaterally defined by the Government of British Columbia, and thus the Band has never retracted its claim on its territory. These reserves are expected to be abolished and absorbed into settlement lands, after the signing of a final agreement.

- Canim Lake 1 - 4400 Acres
- Canim Lake 2 - 160 Acres
- Canim Lake 3 - 40 Acres
- Canim Lake 4 - 40 Acres
- Canim Lake 5 - 148 Acres
- Canim Lake 6 - 40 Acres

== See also ==
- Northern Shuswap Tribal Council
- Canim Lake, British Columbia
