= Canim Falls =

Waterfall in Cariboo, British Columbia, Canada

Coordinates: 51°52′00″N 120°35′35″W

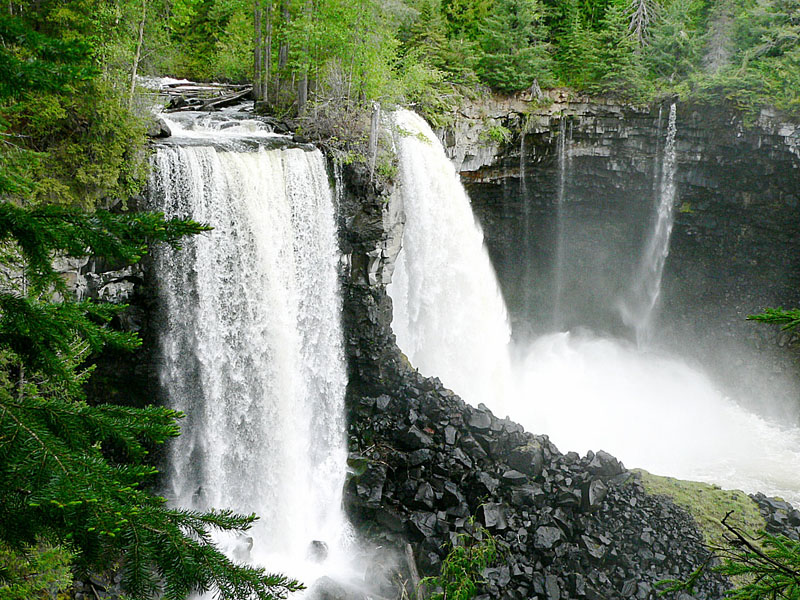
Canim Falls and lava flows.

Canim Falls is a 25 metre high waterfall on the Canim River between Canim Lake and Mahood Lake in Wells Gray Provincial Park in the Cariboo region of the Central Interior of British Columbia, Canada. The waterfall has eroded steadily upstream and created a 4 km (2.5 mi) long canyon cut into a lava plateau associated with the Wells Gray-Clearwater volcanic field.

Both Canim Falls and the nearby Mahood Falls are fed by the Canim River. The river splits into 2 channels several hundred meters above Canim Falls. In times of high flow, the north channel that feeds Mahood Falls overflows causing several small waterfalls on the north canyon wall at Canim Falls.

A trail from Mahood Lake Road leads to a viewpoint of Mahood Falls and Canim Falls. At Canim Falls, an island in the midstream river creates two waterfalls. The southern waterfall (closest to the viewpoint) is much smaller than the main waterfall and is typically dry by mid summer. The larger waterfall runs throughout the year.

"Canim" means a type of large canoe in the Chinook Jargon.

== See also ==
- List of waterfalls
- List of waterfalls of Canada
- List of waterfalls in British Columbia
- Wells Gray-Clearwater volcanic field
