= Helmcken Falls =

Waterfall in British Columbia, Canada

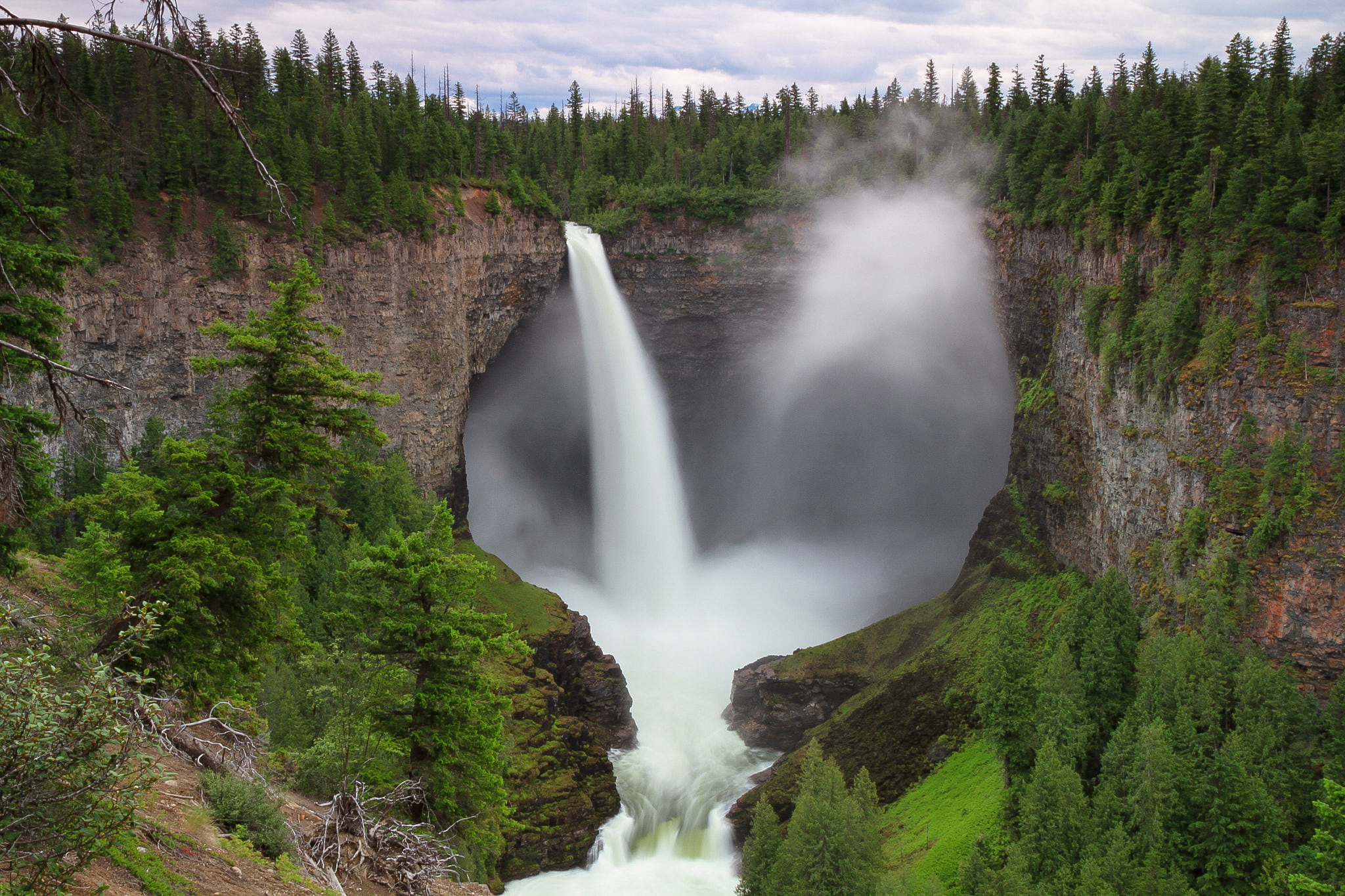
- Helmcken Falls in Wells Gray Provincial Park
- Interactive map of Helmcken Falls
- Location: Wells Gray Provincial Park, British Columbia, Canada
- Coordinates: 51.954092°N 120.176911°W
- Type: Plunging Punchbowl
- Total height: 141 m (463 ft)
- Number of drops: 1
- Total width: 23 m (75 ft)
- Average width: 15 m (49 ft)
- Watercourse: Murtle River
- Average flow rate: 107 m^{3}/s (3,800 cu ft/s)

Helmcken Falls is a 141 m (463 ft) waterfall on the Murtle River within Wells Gray Provincial Park in British Columbia, Canada. The protection of Helmcken Falls was one of the reasons for the creation of Wells Gray Provincial Park in 1939.

There are six other waterfalls on the Murtle River, upstream from Helmcken Falls. The others are The Mushbowl, Dawson Falls, Majerus Falls, Horseshoe Falls, Meadow Falls and McDougall Falls. Only Helmcken, The Mushbowl and Dawson can be reached by road. Majerus, Horseshoe and McDougall Falls are accessed by trails. Meadow Falls is very difficult to view, except by air.

== Discovery and naming ==
The Canadian Pacific Railway surveyors in the 1870s passed to the north and made no mention of seeing the falls. Credit for discovering Helmcken Falls goes to Robert Henry Lee (1859–1935), a land surveyor working for the British Columbia government. In 1911, Lee was awarded a four-year contract to survey lands in the North Thompson and Clearwater Valleys. By 1913, he was working south of the Murtle River laying out lots for homesteaders. On July 24, 1913, he walked west along the Murtle River from his remote camp and reached the top of the waterfall. He was so impressed that he wrote a letter to Sir Richard McBride, Premier of British Columbia, requesting that the falls be named "McBride Falls". Three weeks later, Lee received a reply from the Premier stating that the waterfall was instead to be called Helmcken Falls. This name honoured John Sebastian Helmcken, a physician with the Hudson's Bay Company who arrived in Victoria in 1850. He helped bring British Columbia into Canadian Confederation in 1871. Dr. Helmcken died in 1920 at the age of 95, but never actually saw the falls himself.

== Access and trails ==
A short paved side road from the main Wells Gray Park road leads to Helmcken Falls. A viewing platform on the rim of the canyon provides a panorama of the falls and canyon.

Brink Trail: A 4-km long trail starts near Dawson Falls and follows the south bank of the Murtle River to the brink of Helmcken Falls. This walk takes about 1 1/4 hours each way. There are no fences at the end of this trail so caution is important, especially with children and pets.

Helmcken Canyon: A 30-minute walk west from the main viewpoint follows the rim of Helmcken Canyon to an overlook of the meeting of the Murtle and Clearwater Rivers, about 250 m (820 ft) below.

Gatling Gorge trail: Gatling Gorge is the narrowest point of the Clearwater River, about 20 m (66 ft) across. It is at the head of Helmcken Canyon, upstream from the confluence with the Murtle River. A trail from the main Helmcken Falls viewpoint accesses this gorge and takes about 1.5 hours each way.

== Formation ==
Helmcken Falls drops over the western escarpment of the Murtle Plateau. This huge lava deposit in the Wells Gray-Clearwater volcanic field was erupted from nearby fissures starting 200,000 years ago and filled the wide valley of the Clearwater River. Layer upon layer of fresh lava created the plateau, then enormous floods eroded the lava at the close of the last ice age, about 10,000 years ago. These floods created Helmcken Canyon below the falls.

== Winter viewing ==
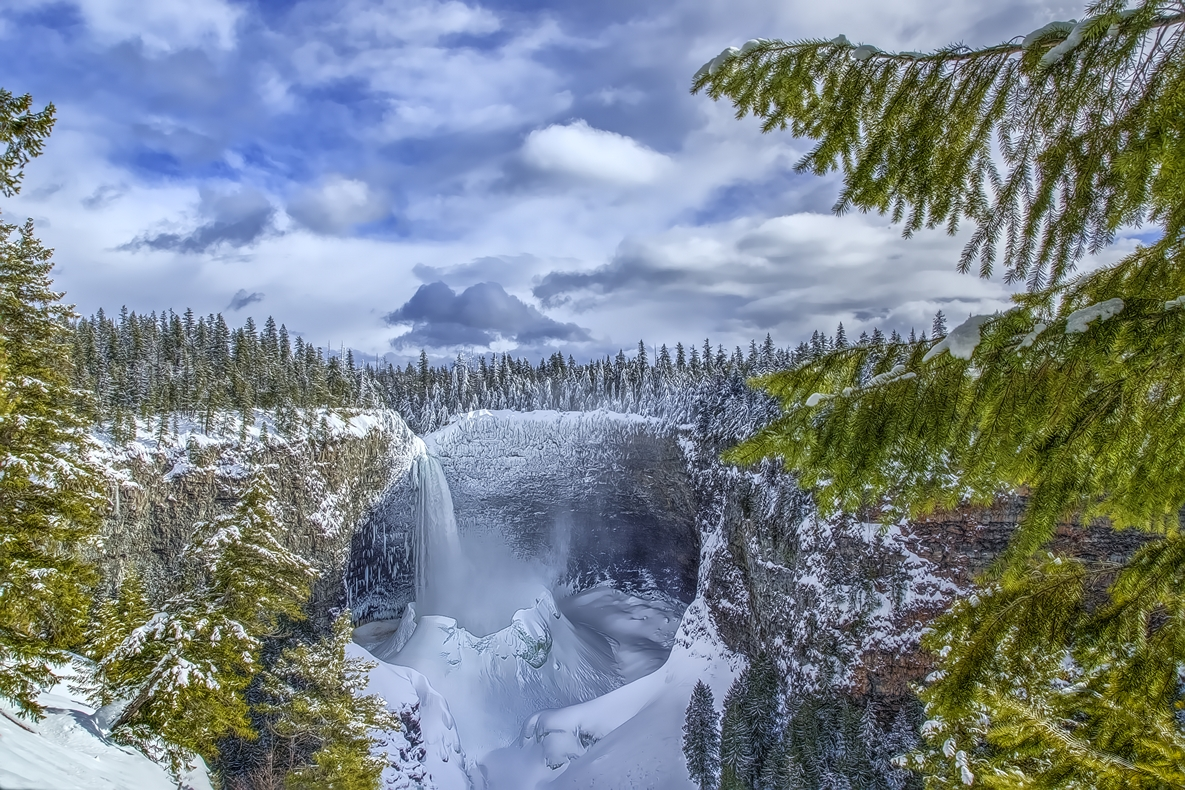
Helmcken Falls with the ice cone

Most tourists see Helmcken Falls in summer. A winter visit is worthwhile because the ice cone at the base often grows to 50 m tall and sometimes even higher in very cold snowy winters. It has occasionally been seen reaching halfway up the falls. The best time to view the ice cone is from late January to the end of February. The cone collapses inward sometime during March and some remnants are still visible in June. The road is plowed and sanded in winter and volunteers maintain the trails. Snow tires are essential and tire chains are recommended as a safety precaution. A network of cross-country ski trails starts near Dawson Falls, but there has been no grooming since the winter of 2011–2012.

== Ice climbing ==
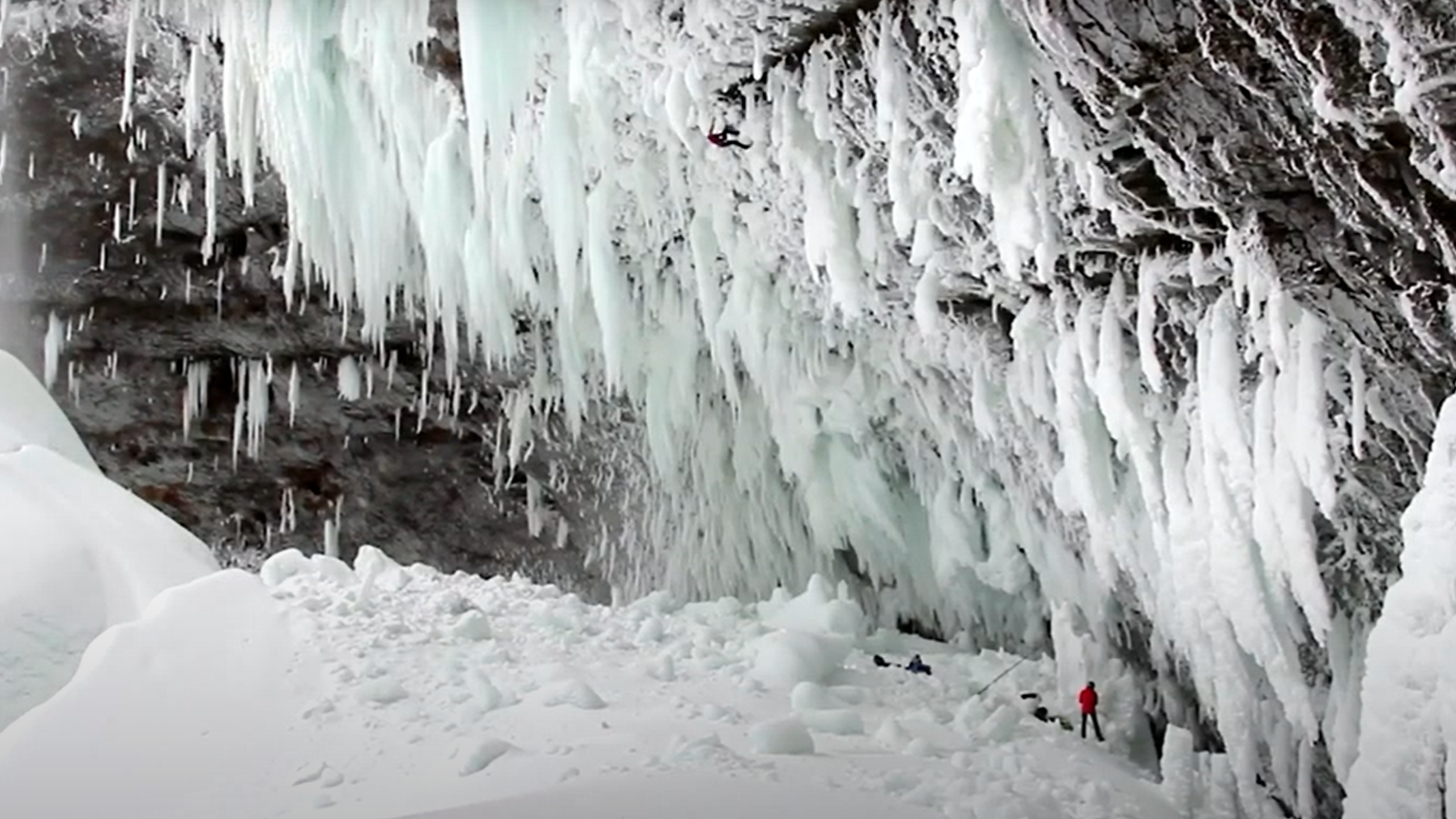
Angelika Rainer on Clash of Titans (WI10+), Helmcken Falls.

Helmcken Falls has some of the world's highest graded ice climbs, most notably, Spray On (W10, 2010), Wolverine (W11, 2011), Interstellar Spice (W12, 2016), and Mission to Mars (W13, 2020). Helmcken has been called the Yosemite of ice climbing.

== See also ==
- Wells Gray-Clearwater volcanic field
- List of waterfalls
- List of waterfalls of Canada
- List of waterfalls in British Columbia
- Volcanism in Canada
