= McDougall Lake =

Lake in British Columbia, Canada

- Location within British Columbia
- Location: British Columbia
- Coordinates: 52.22°N 119.91°W
- Primary inflows: File Creek
- Primary outflows: File Creek
- Basin countries: Canada
- Max. length: 6.7 km (4.2 mi)
- Max. width: 1.2 km (0.75 mi)
- Surface area: 5.83 km^{2} (2.25 sq mi)
- Average depth: 40.5 m (133 ft)
- Max. depth: 72 m (236 ft)
- Water volume: 0.236 km^{3} (0.057 cu mi)
- Shore length^{1}: 15.5 km (9.6 mi)
- Surface elevation: 1,152 m (3,780 ft)
- Islands: none
- Settlements: none
- ^{1} Shore length is not a well-defined measure.

McDougall Lake is a lake in Wells Gray Provincial Park in east-central British Columbia, Canada. It drains through File Creek into Murtle Lake.

== Naming ==
McDougall Lake and McDougall Falls on the Murtle River were named for Pete McDougal who homesteaded in the Clearwater River Valley from 1913 to 1936. The different spelling of these names has evolved over the years.

== Access ==
There is no road or trail to McDougall Lake. Some maps show a trail from Murtle Lake up File Creek, but it has been impassable since the 1980s. The Kostal Lake trail from Clearwater Lake was permanently closed by B.C. Parks in 2013. Float planes and helicopters are allowed to land at McDougall Lake with a permit from B.C. Parks.

Canoes and kayaks can be portaged from Murtle Lake around some outlet rapids on File Creek, then one can paddle 4 km (2.5 mi) upstream. The creek is impassable at a log jam, and a flagged route starts here. The hike to McDougall Lake is 6 km (3.7 mi) and takes about 3 hours cross-country over the lava flows from Kostal Volcano.

== See also ==
- List of lakes of British Columbia
