= Meadow Falls =

Waterfall in Canada

Coordinates: 52°04′00″N 119°59′00″W

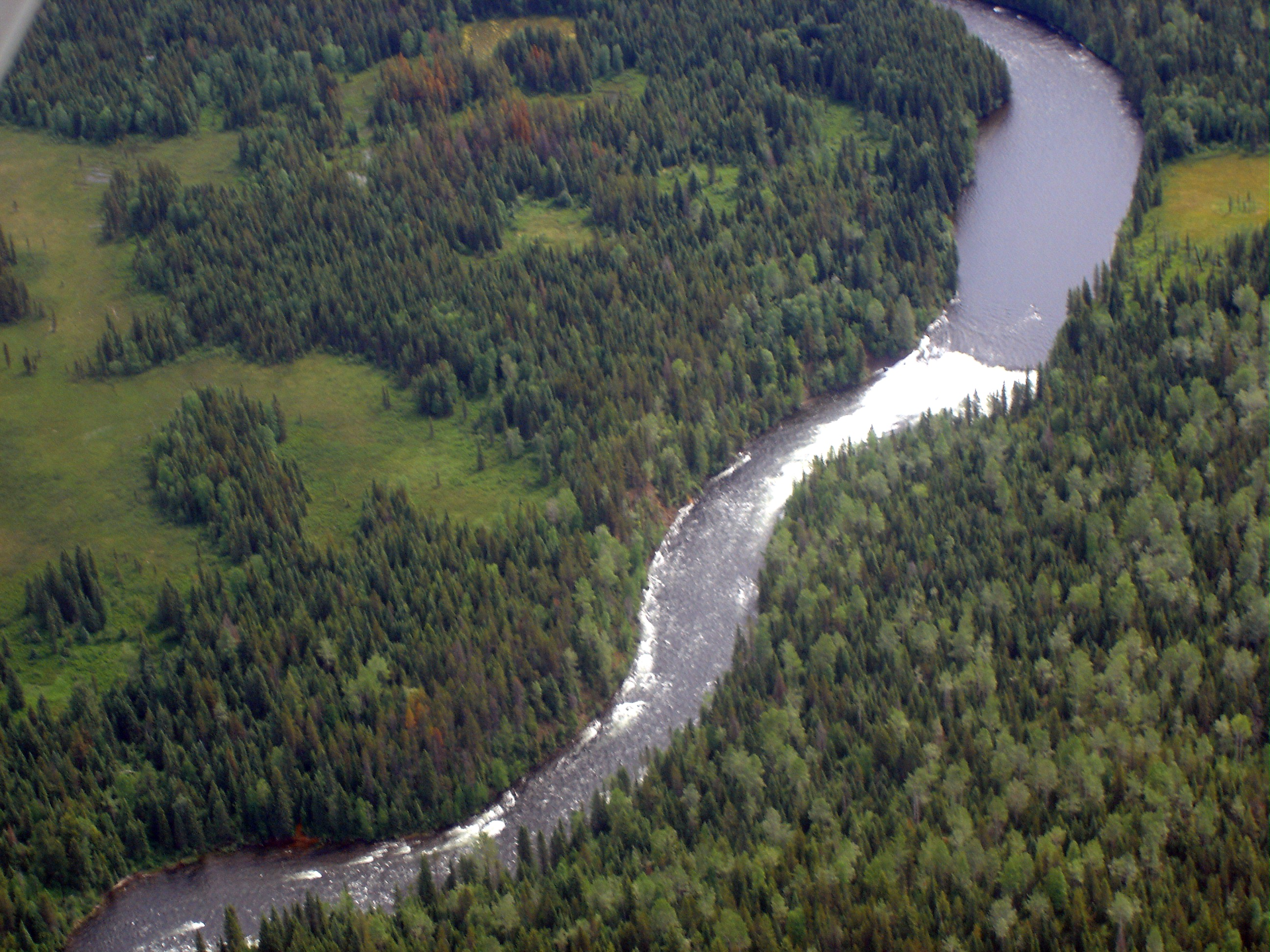
Meadow Falls

Meadow Falls is one of seven waterfalls on the Murtle River west of Murtle Lake in Wells Gray Provincial Park, east-central British Columbia, Canada. Meadow Falls is 8 m (26 ft) high.

The waterfall was discovered by Joseph Hunter, a surveyor working for the future Canadian Pacific Railway, on May 26, 1874. Hunter did not name the falls, but he did name the Murtle River and Murtle Lake for his birthplace in Scotland, Milton of Murtle, near Aberdeen. The Meadow Falls name refers to nearby marshes along the otherwise slow-moving Murtle River, a section known as The Stillwater.

Upstream on the Murtle River is McDougall Falls. Downstream are Horseshoe Falls, Majerus Falls, Dawson Falls, The Mushbowl, and Helmcken Falls.

Visitors to Meadow Falls are rare because there is no road or trail access and the nearby marshes make cross-country travel difficult. The nearest trail ends at Horseshoe Falls, 4 km (2.5 mi) downstream. During the 1950s and 1960s, hunting parties led by guide Thorbjorn "Ted" Helset used the Stillwater Trail which reached the Murtle River 2 km (1.2 mi) above Meadow Falls, but that trail is now overgrown and impassable.

== See also ==
- List of waterfalls in British Columbia
