= Pyramid Mountain =

Pyramid Mountain can refer to:

Antarctica

- Pyramid Mountain (Antarctica), in the Quartermain Mountains
- Pyramid Mountain (Churchill Mountains), in the Churchill Mountains

Canada

- Pyramid Mountain (Alberta) in Jasper National Park, Alberta
- Pyramid Mountain (Garibaldi Provincial Park) in Garibaldi Provincial Park, British Columbia
- Pyramid Mountain (Wells Gray-Clearwater) in Wells Gray Provincial Park, British Columbia
- The Pyramid (British Columbia) in Mount Edziza Provincial Park, British Columbia

United States

- Pyramid Mountain (Alaska Range)
- Pyramid Mountain (Kodiak Island), Alaska
- Pyramid Mountains, New Mexico
- Pyramid Mountain (Clallam County, Washington) in Olympic National Park
- Pyramid Mountain (Montana), in the Beartooth Mountains

== See also ==
- Pyramid Peak (disambiguation)
