= McLeod Hill =

- Location within British Columbia
- Interactive map of McLeod Hill

Highest point
- Elevation: 1,284 m (4,213 ft)
- Prominence: 295 m (968 ft)
- Coordinates: 52°00′N 120°00′W

Geography
- Location: British Columbia, Canada
- District: Kamloops Division Yale Land District
- Parent range: Shuswap Highland
- Topo map: NTS 93A1 Ray Lake

Geology
- Rock age: Pleistocene
- Mountain type: Tuya
- Volcanic field: Wells Gray-Clearwater volcanic field
- Last eruption: Pleistocene

McLeod Hill is a tuya, located 41 km (25 mi) north of Clearwater in the Wells Gray-Clearwater volcanic field in Wells Gray Provincial Park, east-central British Columbia, Canada.

McLeod Hill last erupted about 12,000 years ago when the Murtle Plateau was still covered by ice. However, it may also be the oldest volcano in the Clearwater Valley, dating to about 200,000 years ago when it was the source of the vast quantity of lava that comprises the Murtle Plateau. Viewed from Green Mountain, it looks like a low rounded dome, quite different from nearby Pyramid Mountain.

The Wells Gray Loppet Trail, a popular cross-country ski route, goes over McLeod Hill. It starts at the Murtle River near Dawson Falls and ends at Helmcken Falls Lodge, a distance of 26 km (16 mi). The ski trail is tracked by B.C. Parks volunteers during most winters. Beyond the King Hut rest stop, the trail climbs steeply onto McLeod Hill, then there is a long descent into Hemp Creek Valley. In summer, the trail is one of Wells Gray Park's few mountain biking routes.

== See also ==
- List of volcanoes in Canada
- Volcanism of Canada
- Volcanism of Western Canada
