= Horseshoe Falls (British Columbia) =

Waterfall in British Columbia, Canada

Coordinates: 52°03′07″N 120°01′22″W

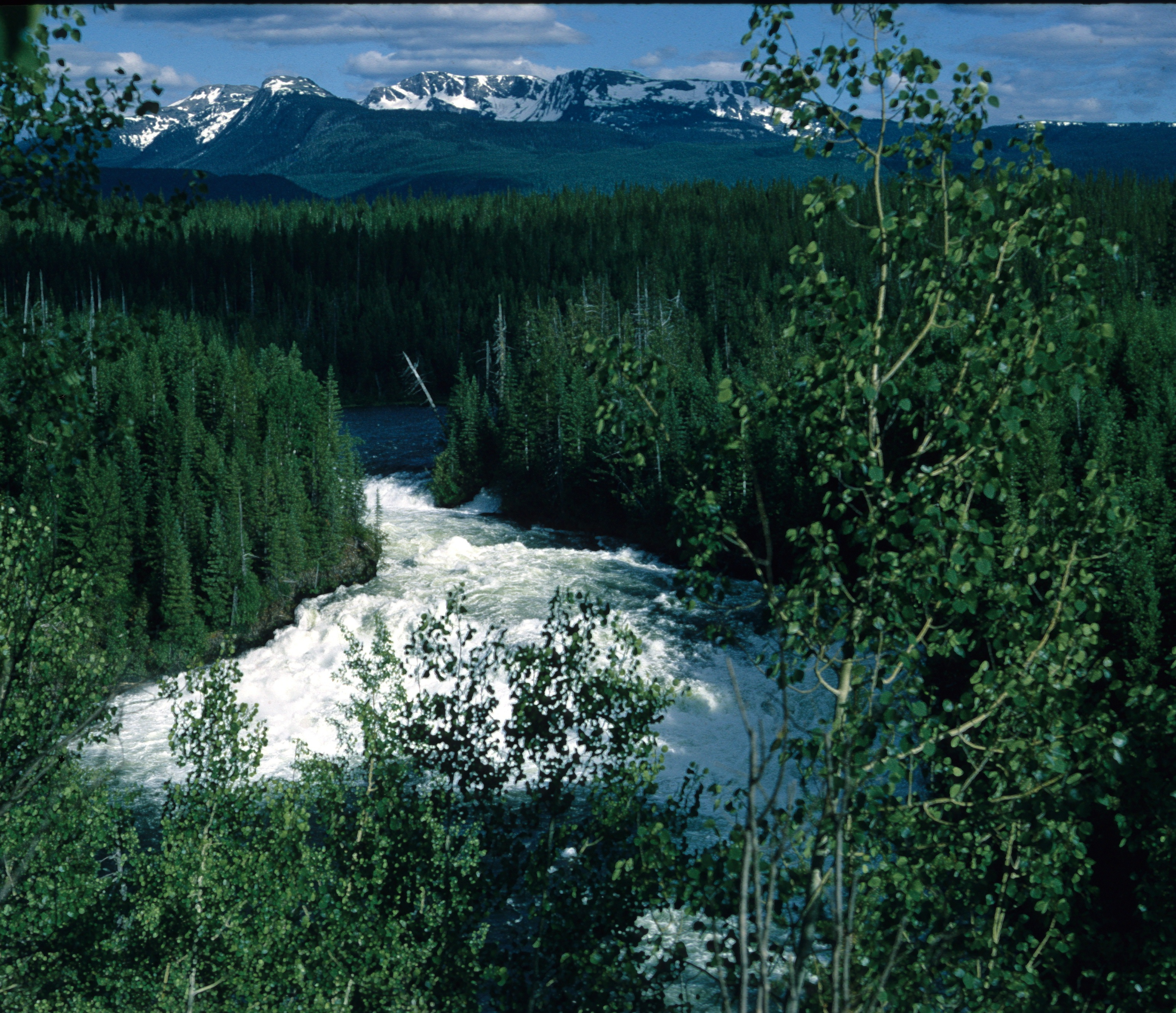
Horseshoe Falls with Battle Mtn behind

Horseshoe Falls is one of seven waterfalls on the Murtle River west of Murtle Lake in Wells Gray Provincial Park, east-central British Columbia, Canada. Horseshoe Falls has two steps, 100 m (328 ft) apart; the upper drop is 6 m (20 ft) high and the lower and much wider drop is 10 m (33 ft) high.

The waterfall was discovered by Joseph Hunter, a surveyor working for the future Canadian Pacific Railway, on May 26, 1874. Hunter did not name the falls, but he did name the Murtle River and Murtle Lake for his birthplace in Scotland, Milton of Murtle, near Aberdeen. Horseshoe Falls was named in 1914 by land surveyor Robert Henry Lee, who mapped homesteaders' lots along the south side of the Murtle River. The river is slow-moving between Horseshoe Falls and Meadow Falls, 4 km (2.5 mi) upstream, and Lee marked a "raft crossing" on his map.

Horseshoe Falls can be reached by a 14 km (8.7 mi) hiking trail from Pyramid Campground on Clearwater Valley Road. The trail passes volcanic Pyramid Mountain and Majerus Falls, and ends at Horseshoe Falls.

== See also ==
- List of waterfalls in British Columbia
