= Pyramid (disambiguation) =

A pyramid is a structure with triangular lateral surfaces converging to an apex.

Pyramid(s) or The Pyramid(s) may also refer to:

== Arts and entertainment ==
=== Film and television ===
- Several television game shows with the same format, created by Bob Stewart and now controlled by Sony Pictures Television:
  - Pyramid (game show), the United States versions since 1973, including The $25,000 Pyramid and Junior Pyramid
  - Pyramid (Australian game show), a children's quiz show in Australia since 2009, based on the U.S. Junior Partner Pyramid
- The PyraMMMid, 2011 crime film
- The Pyramid (film), 2014 horror film
- The Pyramid (TV series), a Croatian weekly talk and debate competition television show begun in 2004
- "The Pyramid", a 1978 episode of The Bionic Woman
- Pyramid, a fictional pastime in the science-fiction TV show Battlestar Galactica

=== Games ===
- Pyramid (solitaire), a card game
- Pyramid (drinking game), a card game most commonly used as a drinking game
- Puzzling Pyramid, magnetic puzzle game released in 1960
- Pyramid (video game), a 1990s Nintendo game by American Video Entertainment
- Pyramid 2000, a 1980s TRS-80 Color Computer interactive fiction text game based on the Colossal Cave Adventure
- Pyramid pool, or pyramids, a cue sport played mainly in the 19th century
- Russian pyramid, known as "pyramid", a pool/snooker type game
- Pyramid, a three-dimensional chess variant
- Pyramid, a fictional pastime in the science-fiction TV show Battlestar Galactica

=== Literature ===
- Pyramid (magazine), a gaming magazine
- Pyramids (novel), a 1989 Terry Pratchett book of the Discworld series
- The Pyramid (Golding novel), 1967, by William Golding
- The Pyramid (Kadare novel), a 1995 Albanian novel by Ismail Kadare
- The Pyramid (short stories), by Henning Mankell, published first as Pyramiden in Swedish in 1999 and afterwards in English in 2008

=== Music ===
==== Performers ====
- Pyramid (band), an American experimental, indie-rock band from North Carolina and active since the early 2000s
- Pyramids, an American experimental group on Hydra Head Records in the 2000s, from Texas, that released their eponymous 2008 debut album Pyramids (album)
- The Pyramids (band), an American surf rock group in the 1960s, from California
- The Pyramids, a jazz and world music group formed in the 1970s and led by Idris Ackamoor
- Symarip, a British reggae group also known as The Pyramids, active from the 1960s to the 1970s
- Starfucker, an indie-electronica band from Oregon, started in 2007 as Pyramid or Pyramiddd

==== Albums ====
- Pyramids (album), the 2008 debut studio album of the American experimental group Pyramids
- Pyramid (The Alan Parsons Project album), 1978
- Pyramid (Modern Jazz Quartet album), 1960
- Pyramid (Cannonball Adderley album), 1974
- Pyramid (Lee Konitz album)
- Pyramid (Jaga Jazzist album), 2020

==== Songs ====
- "Pyramid" (song), by Charice
- "Pyramids" (song), by Frank Ocean
- "Pyramid", a song by Wolfmother on Wolfmother
- "Pyramid", a song by Two Door Cinema Club
- "Pyramid", an instrumental song by Incognito (band)

==== Other uses in music ====
- Pyramid Rock Festival, in Victoria, Australia

== Buildings and structures ==
=== Ancient ===
- The Egyptian Pyramids, especially the Pyramids at Giza
- Kuyavian Pyramids, known as Polish Pyramids, enormous tombs, megalithic structures in Kuyavia, Poland
- Great Pyramid of Cholula, Mexico

=== Modern ===
- Pyramids (Bathgate), a land sculpture in West Lothian, Scotland, built in 1993
- The Pyramid, Castle Howard, a structure in North Yorkshire, England built in 1728
- The Pyramids (Indianapolis), an office development in Indiana
- Louvre Pyramid, four glass and metal pyramids at the Louvre Palace in Paris, France
- Memphis Pyramid, in Memphis, Tennessee
- Portsmouth Pyramids Centre, a leisure complex in the UK
- Walter Pyramid (formerly Long Beach Pyramid), a stadium in California
- Pyramid railway station, Australia

== Businesses ==
- Pyramid Books, a publishing company
- Pyramid Breweries, a brewing company headquartered in Seattle, Washington
- Pyramid Building Society, an Australian company which collapsed in 1990
- Pyramid Technology, a defunct computer company based in California from 1981 to 1995
- The Pyramid Companies, an American shopping mall developer founded in 1970

== Natural formations ==
=== Canada ===
- The Pyramid (British Columbia), a lava dome in British Columbia
- Pyramid Mountain (Wells Gray-Clearwater), a subglacial mound in British Columbia
- Pyramid Lake (Alberta)

=== United States ===
- Pyramid Lake (El Dorado County, California)
- Pyramid Lake (Los Angeles County, California)
- Pyramid Lake (Nevada)
- Pyramid Peak (disambiguation)
- Pyramid Rock (New Mexico), a landform

=== Elsewhere ===
- The Pyramids, a rock formation at Victory Beach, New Zealand
- The Pyramid (Chatham Islands), a small island in the Chatham Islands, New Zealand
- The Pyramid (Antarctica), a distinctive peak in Victoria Land, Antarctica
- The Pyramid (Graham Land), a peak in Graham Land, Antarctica
- Pyramid, Maribor, a low hill in the city of Maribor, Slovenia
- Pyramid Peak (disambiguation)

== Populated places ==
- Pyramid, Illinois, US, an unincorporated community
- Pyramid, Kentucky, US, an unincorporated community
- Pyramid, Nevada, US, an unincorporated community
- Pyramiden, an abandoned Soviet coal mining settlement on the Norwegian archipelago of Svalbard

== Roads ==
- Pyramid Road, US
- Pyramids Road, Australia

== Science, technology, and mathematics ==
=== Anatomy and medicine ===
- Petrous part of the temporal bone, the pyramid
- Pyramid (brainstem), the anterior part of medulla oblongata

=== Computing ===
- Pyramid (image processing), a type of multi-scale signal representation
- Pyramid (web framework), an open source web application framework written in Python
- A project aiming to rewrite Microsoft Word from scratch, codenamed Pyramid

=== Other uses in science, technology, and mathematics ===
- Pyramid (geometry), a polyhedron formed by connecting a polygonal base and a point, called the apex
- Ecological pyramid

== Sport ==
- League system, a hierarchy of leagues in a given sport
- Pyramids Football Club, an Egyptian professional association football (soccer) club
- Human pyramid, a vertically oriented, triangular or pyramid-shaped formation of people

== Other uses ==
- A type of organizational structure
- Pyramid scheme, a non-sustainable business model
- Hierarchy
- Human pyramid, a vertically oriented, triangular or pyramid-shaped formation of people
- Former name for the Order of the Solar Temple

== See also ==
- Inverted pyramid (disambiguation)
- Piramida (disambiguation)
- Pyramide (disambiguation)
- Pyramiden, a mining settlement in Svalbard, Norway
