= The Pyramids =

The Pyramids may refer to:

- Egyptian pyramids, especially the Giza pyramid complex
- The Pyramids (band), a surf rock group from Long Beach, California
- The Pyramids, a jazz ensemble led by musician Idris Ackamoor
- The Pyramids (Indianapolis), buildings in Indianapolis
- The Pyramids, a rock formation at Victory Beach, New Zealand
- Former name of Symarip, a Jamaican reggae band
- The Pyramids, the dangerous district of the city of Évry-Courcouronnes, Paris, France

== See also ==
- Pyramid (disambiguation)
