= Majerus Falls =

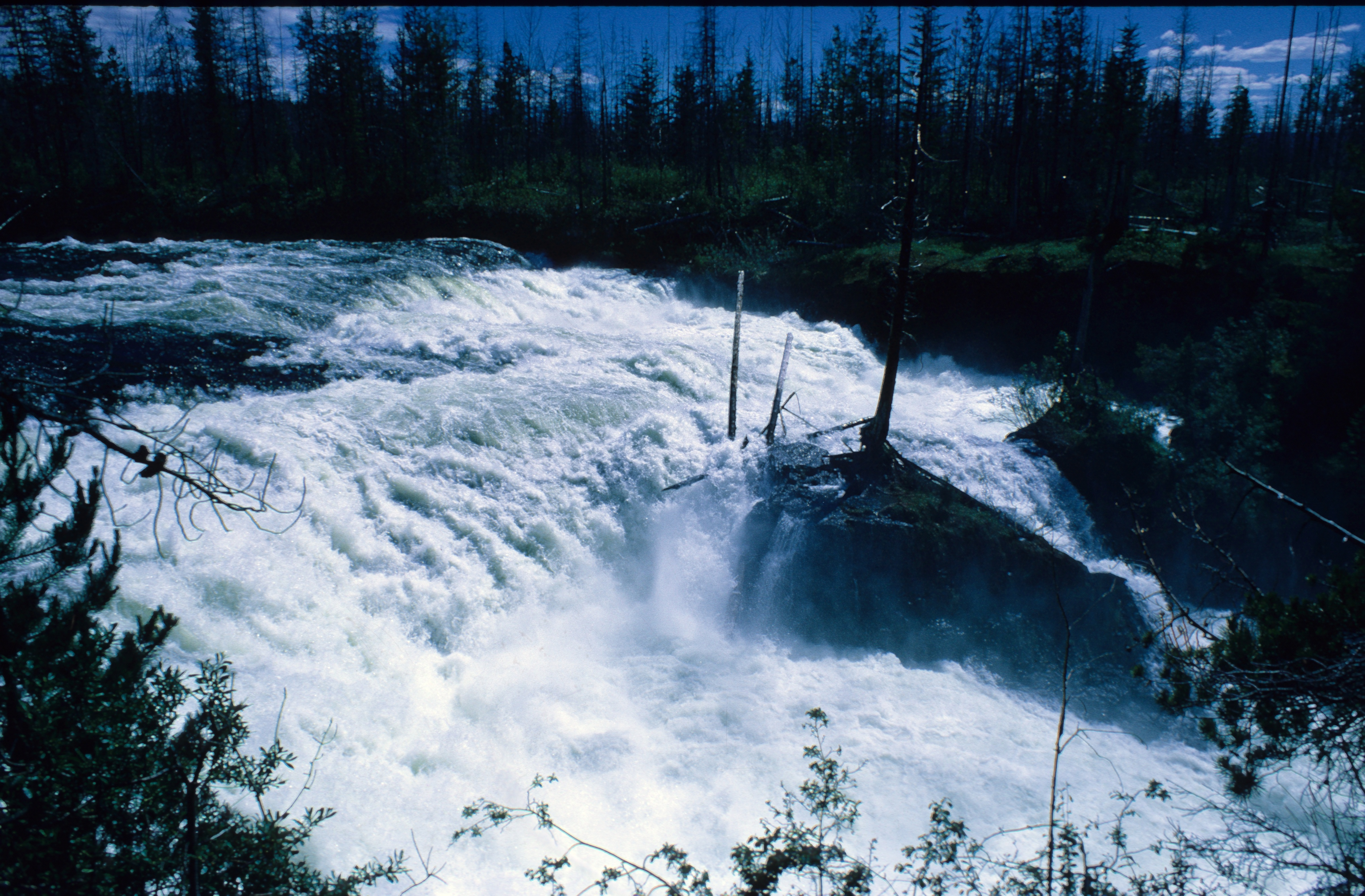

Majerus Falls is one of seven waterfalls on the Murtle River west of Murtle Lake in Wells Gray Provincial Park, east-central British Columbia, Canada.

Majerus Falls is 12 m (39 ft) high and 90 m (295 ft) wide, a similar width to Dawson Falls downstream.

The waterfall was discovered by Joseph Hunter, a surveyor working for the future Canadian Pacific Railway, on May 25, 1874. Hunter did not name the falls, but he did name the Murtle River and Murtle Lake for his birthplace in Scotland, Milton of Murtle, near Aberdeen. Majerus Falls and tiny Majerus Lake, north of here, are named for Michael Majerus, one of the first homesteaders in the Clearwater Valley. He built a cabin beside the Murtle River above Dawson Falls in 1912 and lived there until 1946.

Access to Majerus Falls is by a hiking trail that starts at the Pyramid Campground. It skirts volcanic Pyramid Mountain and follows the north side of the Murtle River. The trail is 10 km (6.2 mi) long each way; allow about 3.5 hours to get to the falls.

== See also ==
- List of waterfalls
- List of waterfalls in British Columbia
