= Fiftytwo Ridge =

Ridge in British Columbia, Canada

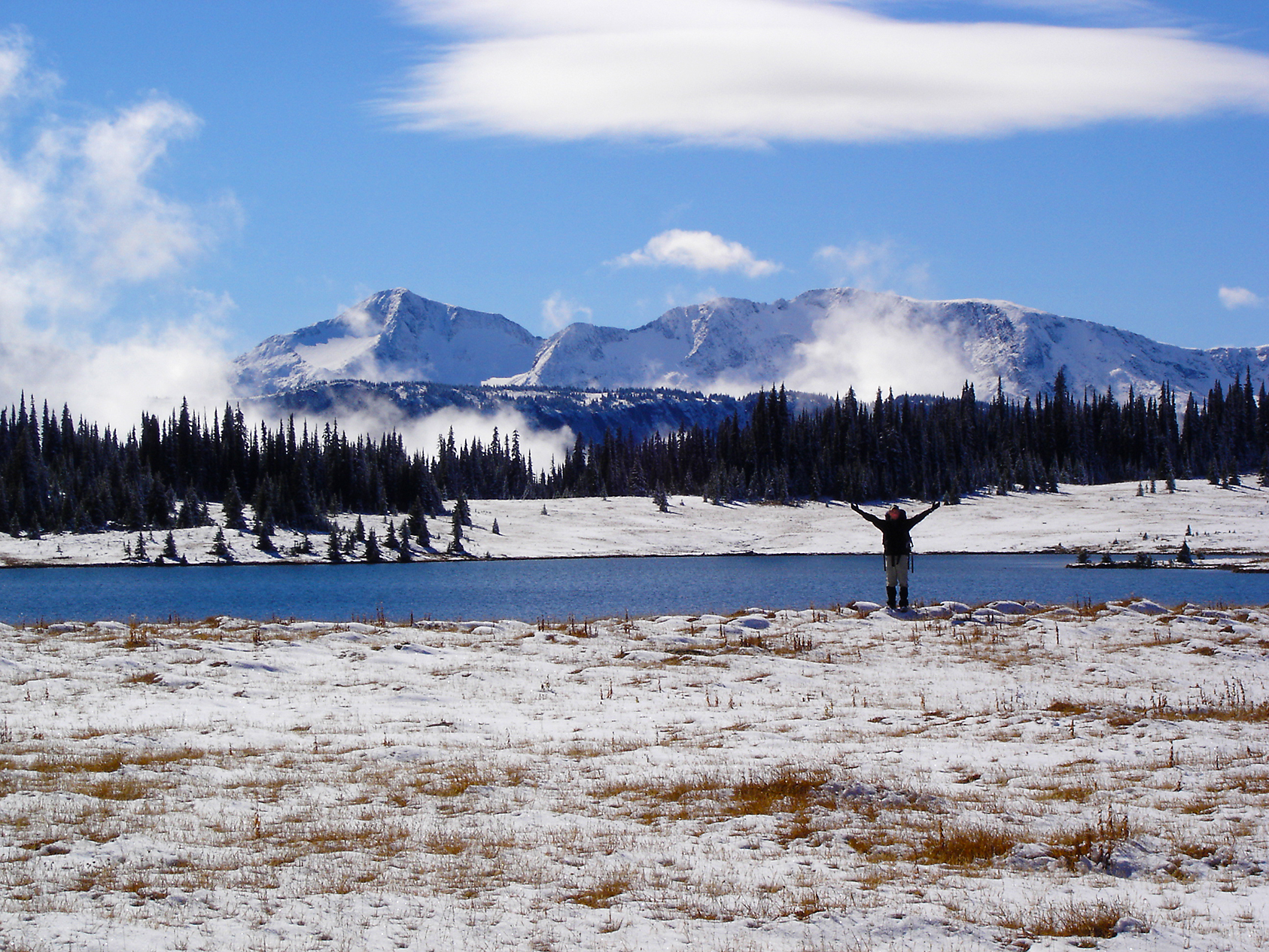
- Fight Lake and Fiftytwo Ridge with Battle Mountain behind

Highest point
- Elevation: 1,996 m (6,549 ft)
- Prominence: 125 m (410 ft)
- Coordinates: 51.93°N 119.89°W

Geography
- Location: British Columbia, Canada
- Topo map: NTS 82M13 West Raft River

Geology
- Rock age: Pleistocene
- Mountain type: Subglacial volcano
- Volcanic field: Wells Gray-Clearwater volcanic field
- Last eruption: Pleistocene

Fiftytwo Ridge is a mountain ridge in east-central British Columbia, Canada, located just southwest of Battle Mountain at the southeastern end of Wells Gray Provincial Park.

== Geology ==
Fiftytwo Ridge is a volcanic feature associated with the Wells Gray-Clearwater volcanic field. It is a subglacial volcano that formed in the Pleistocene epoch when this area was buried beneath the Cordilleran Ice Sheet during the Quaternary glaciation. The eruptions melted the ice, so the hot magma contacted with water and caused violent explosions. About 20 small craters can be found today. Some contain fine examples of scoria, an extraordinarily light-weight rock with numerous air-holes. When hiking here early in summer, some of the craters may be filled with runoff water (called maars) and are less obvious.

== Naming ==
Fiftytwo Ridge has only been called that since 1952 when a biological study was conducted here by Ralph Ritcey and Pat Martin. The name has many different versions such as Fifty Two Ridge, Fifty-Two Ridge and 52 Ridge, but the correct spelling according to BC Geographical Names is one word, Fiftytwo Ridge. As early as 1935, it was known as Bull Ridge and the valley between it and Battle Mountain was called Bull Valley. Clearwater Valley ranchers Laurence and Charlie Ludtke often guided big-game hunters into these meadows, in search of the prized bull caribou.

== See also ==
- List of volcanoes in Canada
- Volcanism of Canada
- Volcanism of Western Canada
