= Piramida =

Piramida may refer to:

- Piramida, a former museum in Tirana, Albania
- Pyramiden, an abandoned Russian coal mining community on Svalbard, Norway
- Piramida (album), the fourth studio album by Danish band Efterklang

== See also ==
- Pyramid (disambiguation)
