= Nevado Las Agujas =

Mountain in Chile

- Location within Chile

Highest point
- Elevation: 2,120 m (6,960 ft)
- Prominence: 300 m (980 ft)
- Coordinates: 39°49′57″S 72°12′57″W

Geography
- Location: Chile
- Parent range: Andes

Geology
- Rock age: Miocene
- Mountain type: Glacial horn

Nevado Las Agujas (Spanish for The Snowy Needles) is a pyramidal peak in the Andes Mountains of Futrono, in Chile, close to the border with Argentina. With an elevation of 2,120 metres (6,960 ft; 1.32 mi), it has a prominence of 300 m (984 ft) above the surrounding terrain. Together with Cerro Chihuío, it forms the granitic mountain massif of Nevados Las Agujas, which geologically belongs to the North Patagonian Batholith.
