= McDougall Falls =

Coordinates: 52°05′31″N 119°52′26″W

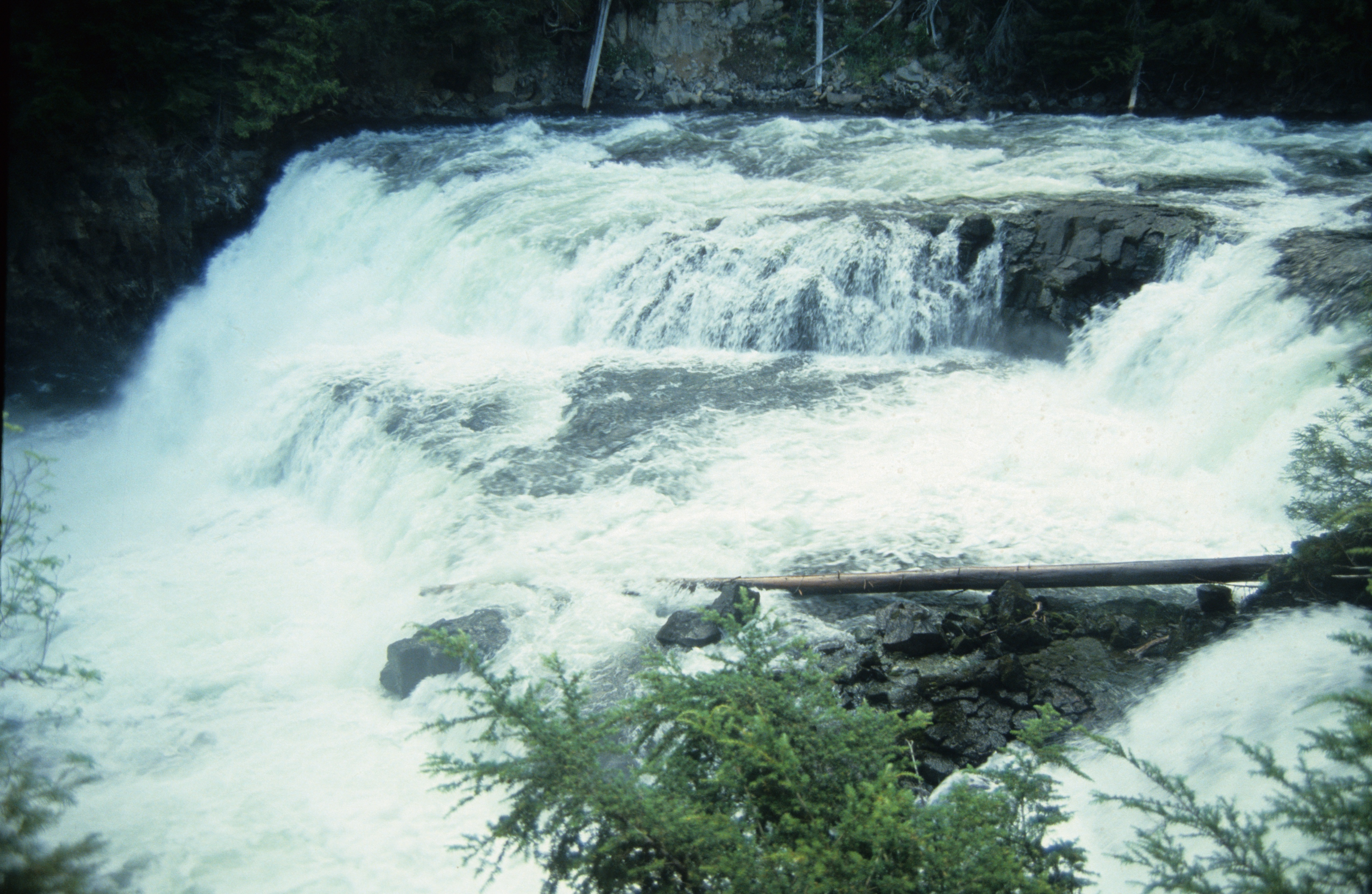

McDougall Falls is a waterfall on the Murtle River in Wells Gray Provincial Park, east-central British Columbia, Canada.

McDougall Falls is located 5 km (3.1 mi) downstream from the Diamond Lagoon of Murtle Lake. It is 14 m (46 ft) high. A hiking trail follows the south shore of the Murtle River from the lagoon. This trail is only accessible by canoeing across Murtle Lake.

The waterfall was discovered by Joseph Hunter, a surveyor working for the future Canadian Pacific Railway, on May 27, 1874. Hunter did not name the falls, but he did name the Murtle River and Murtle Lake for his birthplace in Scotland, Milton of Murtle, near Aberdeen. McDougall Falls and McDougall Lake, north of here, were named for Pete McDougal who homesteaded in the Clearwater River Valley from 1913 to 1936. The different spelling of these names has evolved over the years.

== See also ==
- List of waterfalls
- List of waterfalls in British Columbia
