= Mount Fellows =

Mountain in Alaska, United States

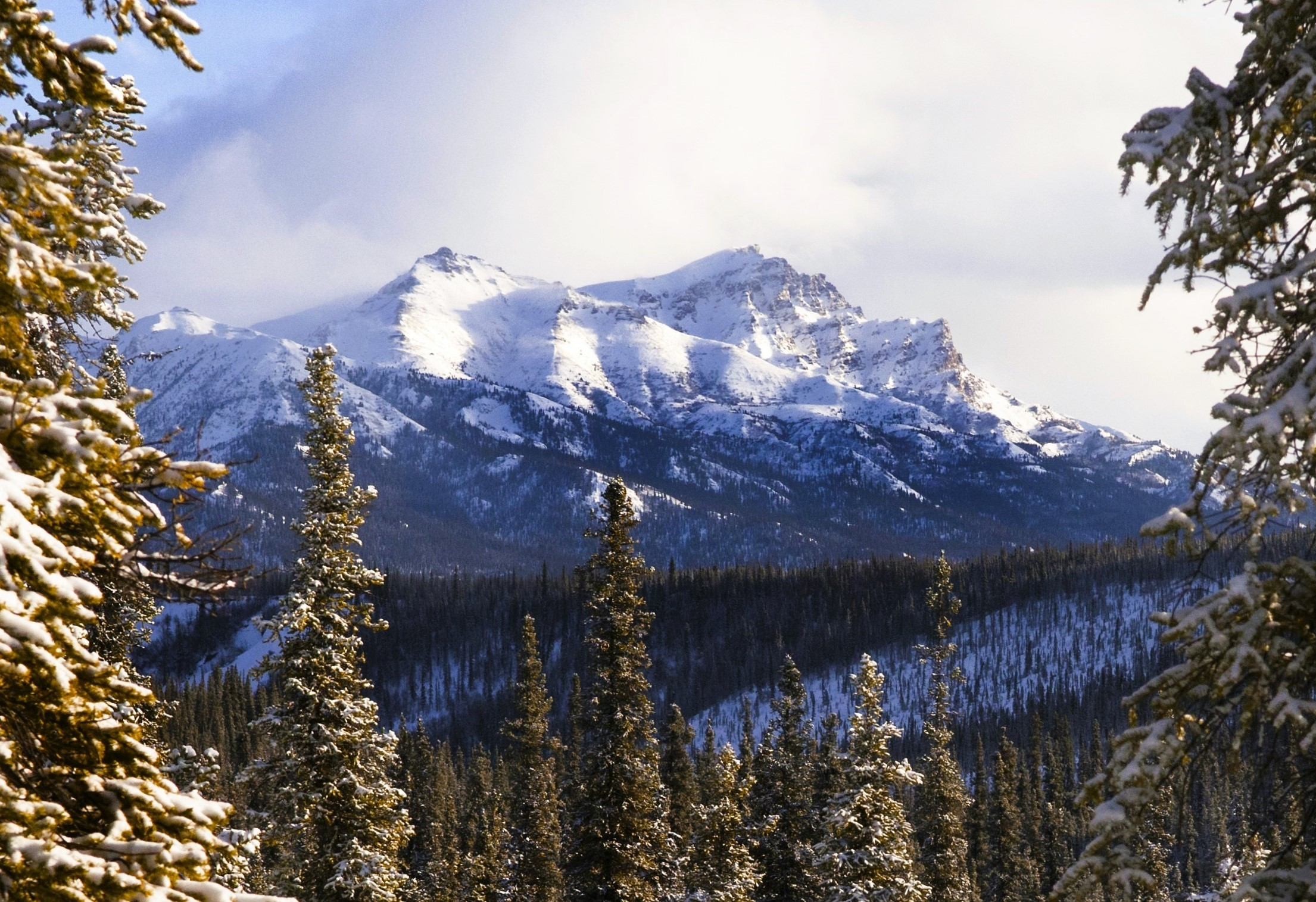
- West aspect

Highest point
- Elevation: 4,476 ft (1,364 m)
- Prominence: 726 ft (221 m)
- Parent peak: Sugar Loaf Mountain
- Isolation: 1.65 mi (2.66 km)
- Coordinates: 63°42′29″N 148°45′08″W

Geography
- Location within Alaska
- Interactive map of Mount Fellows
- Country: United States
- State: Alaska
- Borough: Denali
- Parent range: Alaska Range
- Topo map: USGS Healy C-4

Geology
- Rock type: Volcanic rock

Mount Fellows is a 4,476-foot-elevation (1,364-meter) mountain summit in Alaska, United States.

== Description ==
Mount Fellows is located five miles (8.0 km) east of Denali National Park headquarters and 8.25 miles (13.28 km) northwest of Pyramid Mountain in the Alaska Range. Precipitation runoff from the mountain drains into tributaries of the Nenana River, which in turn is part of the Tanana River drainage basin. Although modest in elevation, topographic relief is significant as the summit rises over 2,800 feet (914 m) above the Nenana River in 1.75 miles (2.82 km). The mountain's name was reported in 1950 by the USGS, and the toponym has been officially adopted by the United States Board on Geographic Names.

== Climate ==
Based on the Köppen climate classification, Mount Fellows is located in a subarctic climate zone with long, cold, snowy winters, and mild summers. Winter temperatures can drop below 0 °F with wind chill factors below −20 °F. The months May through June offer the most favorable weather for viewing.

== Gallery ==
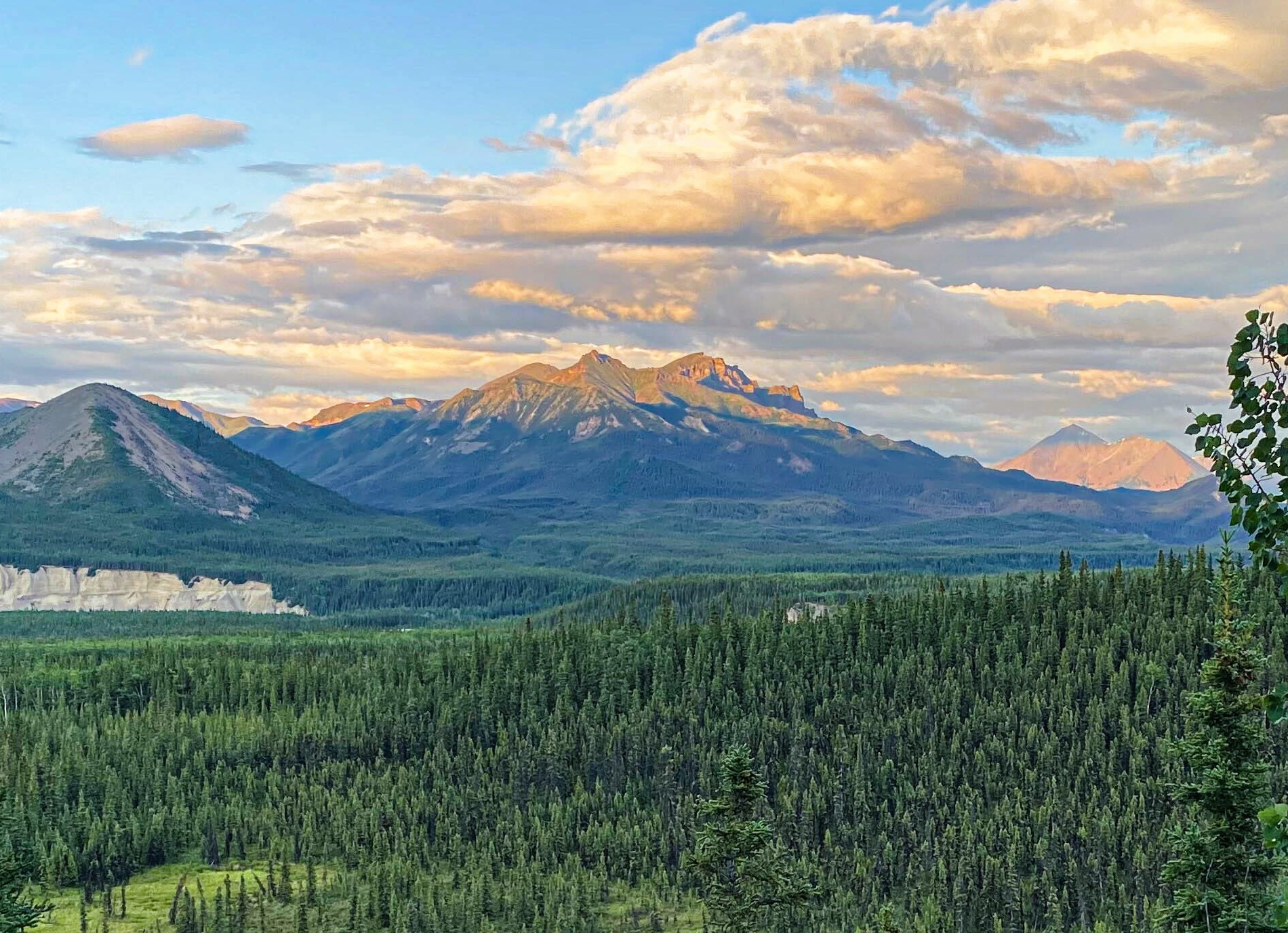
Mount Fellows, centered

== See also ==
- List of mountain peaks of Alaska
- Geography of Alaska
