= Pyramide =

Pyramide may refer to:

- Pyramide, brand name in Japan and Thailand for pyrazinamide, an anti-tuberculosis drug
- Pyramide (benzamide), a group of benzamides, one of which is used as a fungicide
- Pyramidal tracts, anatomical feature, aggregations of nerve fibres from the spinal cord to the brain, sometimes referred to as "pyramides"
- Pyramide (patience), a double-deck solitaire card game
- Die Pyramide, a high-rise building in Berlin
- La Pyramide a restaurant in Vienne, Isère, France
- La Pyramide (building), a building in Abidjan, Ivory Coast

== See also ==
- Pyramid (disambiguation)
