= Murtle River =

Coordinates: 51.969°N 120.115°W

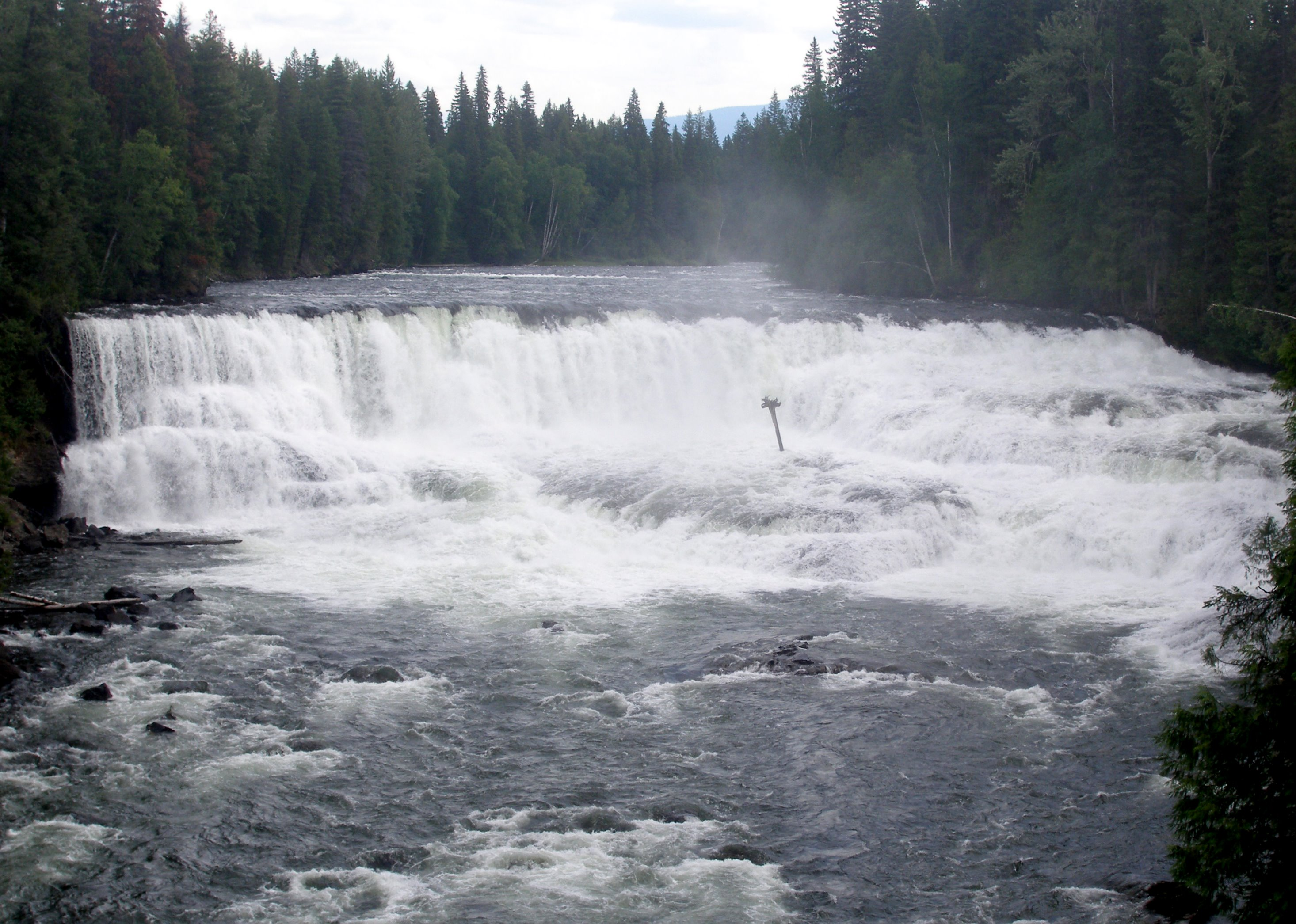
- Dawson Falls

Location
- Country: Canada
- Province: British Columbia

Physical characteristics
- Length: 36 km (22 mi)

Basin features
- River system: Clearwater River
- Waterbodies: Murtle Lake
- Waterfalls: McDougall, Meadow, Horseshoe, Majerus, Dawson, The Mushbowl and Helmcken Falls

The Murtle River is a river in east-central British Columbia, Canada. It rises from a large unnamed glacier in the Cariboo Mountains at an elevation of 2,300 metres (7,500 ft) and flows southwest for 18 kilometres (11 mi) to the head of gigantic Murtle Lake. The river also drains Murtle Lake then flows southwest for 36 kilometres (22 mi) into the Clearwater River. The Murtle River is the longest and largest tributary to the Clearwater.

The Murtle River is known for having many waterfalls along its course. Between Murtle Lake and the Clearwater River, the Murtle drops over seven named waterfalls: McDougall, Meadow, Horseshoe, Majerus, Dawson, The Mushbowl and Helmcken Falls.

== Discovery and naming ==
There are no records about the Murtle River being known by First Nations. The river was discovered by Joseph Hunter, a surveyor working for the future Canadian Pacific Railway, on May 25, 1874. Hunter's expedition rafted across the Clearwater River near The Horseshoe, headed east for about 13 kilometres (8 mi), and reached the Murtle River upstream from Majerus Falls. He named the river and, a few days later, Murtle Lake for his birthplace in Scotland, Milton of Murtle, near Aberdeen. Between 1872 and 1881, about 20 survey parties fanned out across British Columbia trying to find the best route for the new railway between Yellowhead Pass in the Rocky Mountains and the Pacific Coast. Three survey parties visited what is now Wells Gray Park. When the more southern Kicking Horse Pass was chosen instead in 1881, all of these meticulously examined routes across the Canadian Cordilleran, including Hunter's, were abandoned. Only three place names in the park recognize those 10 wasted years of surveys: Murtle River and Lake, Mahood River and Lake, and Marcus Falls. The latter two refer to James Adam Mahood and Marcus Smith, leaders of two other railway surveys during the 1870s.

It was 40 years before the Murtle River area came under professional scrutiny again, this time by land surveyor Robert Lee. In 1913, he laid out 65-hectare (160-acre) lots beside the Murtle River and discovered Helmcken Falls. He was so impressed with the waterfall that he wrote a letter from his remote camp to Sir Richard McBride, British Columbia's premier, asking "may I name the river the McBride River and the falls the McBride Falls in honor of the distinguished Premier of British Columbia?" This ignored the prior naming of the Murtle River by Joseph Hunter. Three weeks later, Lee received a reply of one sentence from the Premier which stated that the waterfall was to be called Helmcken Falls. The McBride River was not mentioned, so Lee thereafter put Murtle River on his maps.

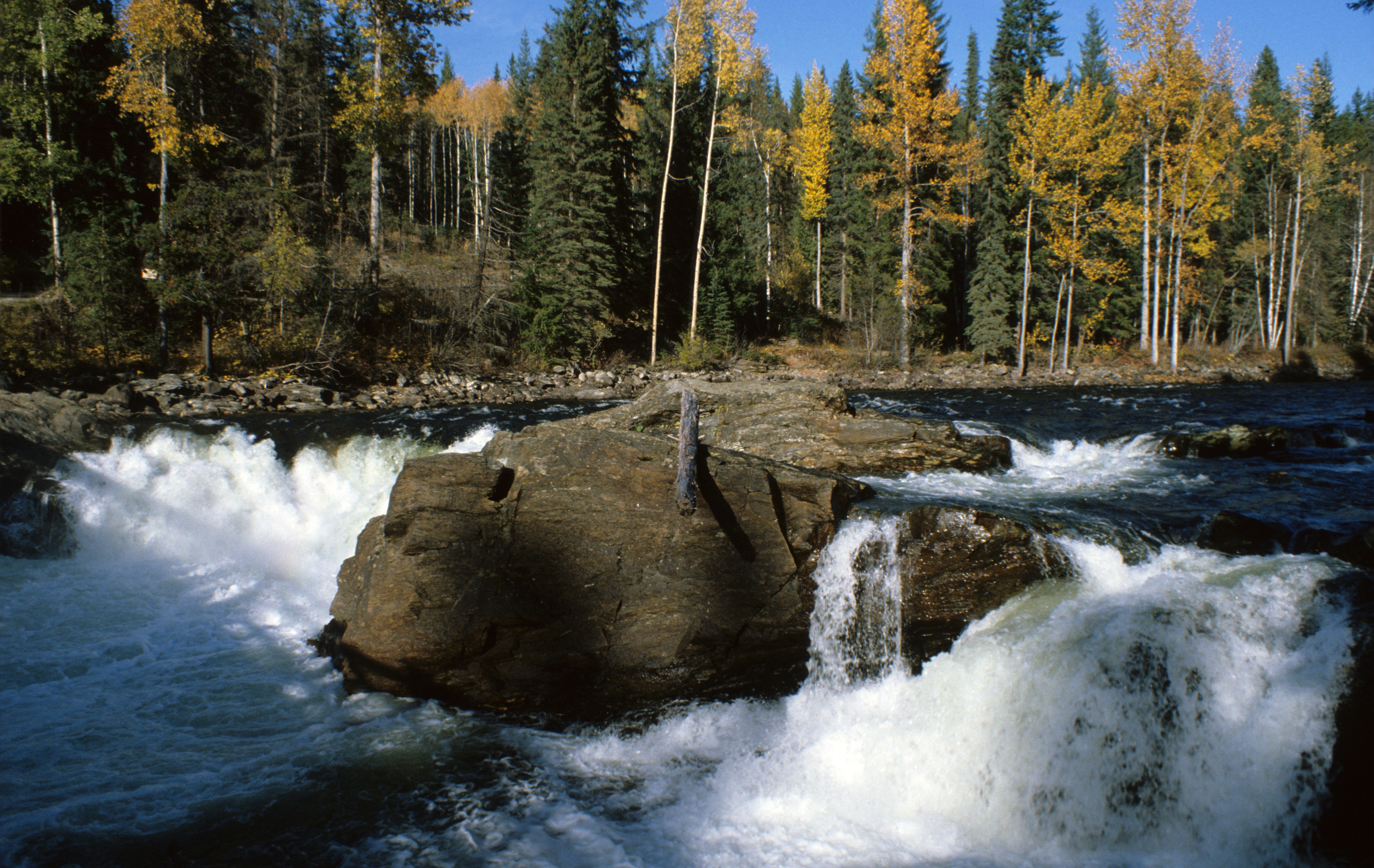
The Mushbowl near Dawson Falls

== Bridges ==
The first crossing of the Murtle River was at its narrowest point called The Mushbowl and this was a rickety footbridge built in 1914. A horse bridge was completed in 1928 but it consisted of only two stringers and cross logs with no guard rails, and horses were terrified to cross it. It was damaged by high water in 1936 and replaced. When Arthur Wellesley Gray, after whom Wells Gray Park is named, made his ill-fated tour in 1940, he was overcome by dizziness while crossing this bridge and nearly became the first victim of The Mushbowl. The first road bridge was built in 1949 when the road was being extended to Clearwater Lake and it lasted until 1974. Few visitors during those years could resist stopping for a photograph of that attractive Queen's Truss bridge. The present bridge is a narrow Bailey-type bridge on the same site with the Murtle River roaring through The Mushbowl underneath. It is still the only bridge across the Murtle in its entire length.

== Geological features ==
The Murtle River flows across the huge volcanic Murtle Plateau for the last 30 kilometres (19 mi) to the Clearwater. The lava erupted about 200,000 years ago from fissures near McLeod Hill and filled the former valley to depths of up to 250 metres (820 ft). The extent of this relatively flat surface is best seen from the viewing tower atop Green Mountain.

Pyramid Mountain is a prominent feature beside the Murtle River a few kilometers northeast of the road. It is a subglacial mound which erupted under the ice about 12,000 years ago and built its 230-metre (750 ft) high cone.

Below Helmcken Falls, the Murtle River rushes through Helmcken Canyon for 1.5 km (0.93 mi) until it meets the Clearwater River. The river is hemmed by sheer lava walls that rise over 200 metres (660 ft) on each side.

== See also ==
- Clearwater River
- Helmcken Falls
- Dawson Falls
- List of rivers of British Columbia
