= Battle Mountain (British Columbia) =

Mountain in Thompson-Nicola Regional District, British Columbia, Canada

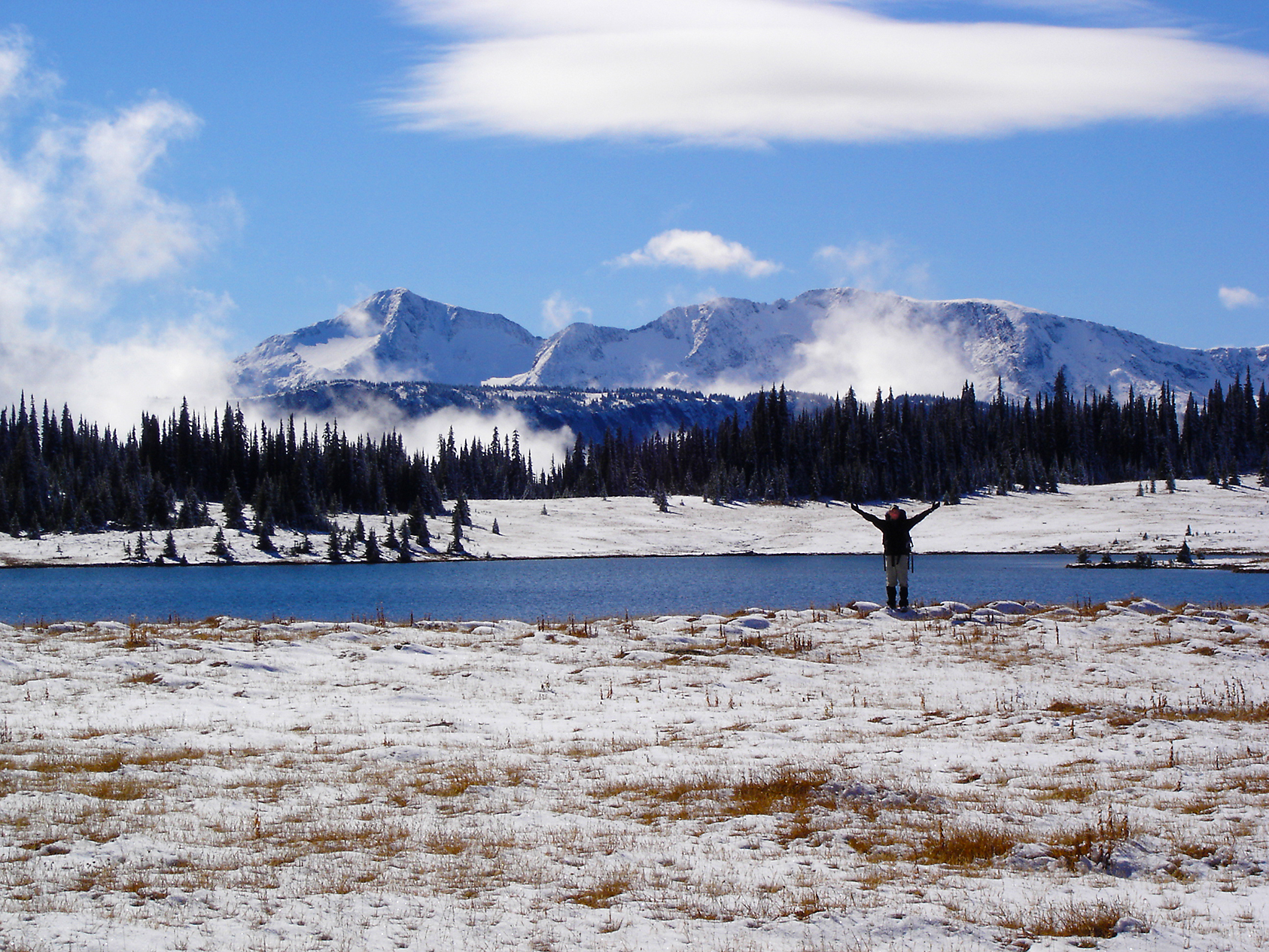
- Battle Mountain seen from Fight Lake

Highest point
- Elevation: 2,369 m (7,772 ft)
- Parent peak: Trophy Mountain (2577 m)
- Listing: Mountains of British Columbia
- Coordinates: 51°57′09″N 119°51′17″W

Geography
- Location within British Columbia
- Interactive map of Battle Mountain
- Location: British Columbia, Canada
- District: Kamloops Division Yale Land District
- Parent range: Shuswap Highland
- Topo map: NTS 82M13 West Raft River

Geology
- Mountain type: Pyramidal peak

Climbing
- Easiest route: Via Fight Lake and Fiftytwo Ridge

Battle Mountain is a mountain in east-central British Columbia, Canada, located in the south-east region of Wells Gray Provincial Park. The Clearwater River flows to the west, Stevens Lakes are to the east, Philip Creek is to the south and Hemp Creek is to the north. Battle Mountain is part of the Shuswap Highland. There are three summits in the group, ranging from 2,306 m (7,566 ft) to 2,369 m (7,772 ft).

Battle Mountain is accessible by a combination of road and trail. It is a popular summer tourist attraction and is especially noted for colourful alpine meadows. The access trail is longer and more strenuous than the one to nearby Trophy Mountain to the south, so fewer people visit Battle Mountain and the Caribou Meadows. The hike to the meadows can be accomplished as a day outing, but hikers who want to attain Fiftytwo Ridge and Battle Mountain summit should plan for two days and carry overnight equipment.

== Access ==
Battle Mountain Road turns east off Clearwater Valley Road (also called Wells Gray Park Road) 26.6 km (16.5 mi) north of the Yellowhead Highway. The gravel road is passable for all vehicles for the first 2.4 km (1.5 mi), then it becomes steep and rough; so that a high-clearance vehicle is necessary for the next 5 km (3.1 mi) to the parking lot.

A well-used trail starts here. The first section is the steepest and climbs 248 m (814 ft) in 2.1 km (1.3 mi) up the canyon of Philip Creek to a hanging valley where Philip Lake is located. Then it continues at an easier grade, ascending 170 m (558 ft) to the beginning of the Caribou Meadows. The trail meanders through the meadows, along the west shore of Fight Lake, then climbs to the top of Fiftytwo Ridge. Beyond there, it is a hiking route through meadows and rock which first descends into Bull Valley, then climbs onto Battle Mountain itself. The hiking season on Battle Mountain is from late June through September.

== Origin of names ==
- Battle Mountain: The names "Battle Mountain", "Battle Creek", "Fight Lake" and "Indian Valley" all arise from a legendary First Nations skirmish between the Chilcotin and Shuswap bands around 1875. In the mid-nineteenth century, great herds of caribou migrated each spring through the Clearwater Valley in an east-west direction. The Chilcotin First Nation dominated most of the migration route, except for the Battle Mountain area where the Canim Lake band and the Shuswap band at Chu Chua hunted. At some of the small lakes in Indian Valley, the Chilcotins built long wire and stone fences leading to a narrow opening on the lakeshore. The caribou were then chased through the V-shaped traps into the water and speared as they swam to shore. The Canim and Simpcw bands recently suggested the incident was more of skirmish between two small bands of hunters with one group feeling that the other shouldn’t be there and chasing them. They dismissed the common belief that this was a “battle,” so the story seems to have been exaggerated over 1½ centuries and these place names may not be appropriate.
- Fiftytwo Ridge: Named because a biological study by Pat Martin and Ralph Ritcey was conducted there in 1952.
- Philip Creek: Named for Clearwater Valley land-owners William and Ella Philip.
- Mount Philip: Although near the head of Philip Creek, it was named for Mr. C. Philips, an assistant on Robert Lee's 1914 land survey of the Clearwater Valley and Murtle Plateau.
- Stevens Lakes: This chain of six lakes along Snookwa Creek is east of Battle Mountain and near the treeline. The lakes are named for Whitney W. "Pat" Stevens of the British Columbia Forest Service who conducted a forest reconnaissance survey in the Clearwater Valley in 1921. He was 22 that summer, a graduate of the University of New Brunswick, and spent most of his life in forestry work. He died in 1960.
