= Dawson Falls =

Waterfall in British Columbia, Canada

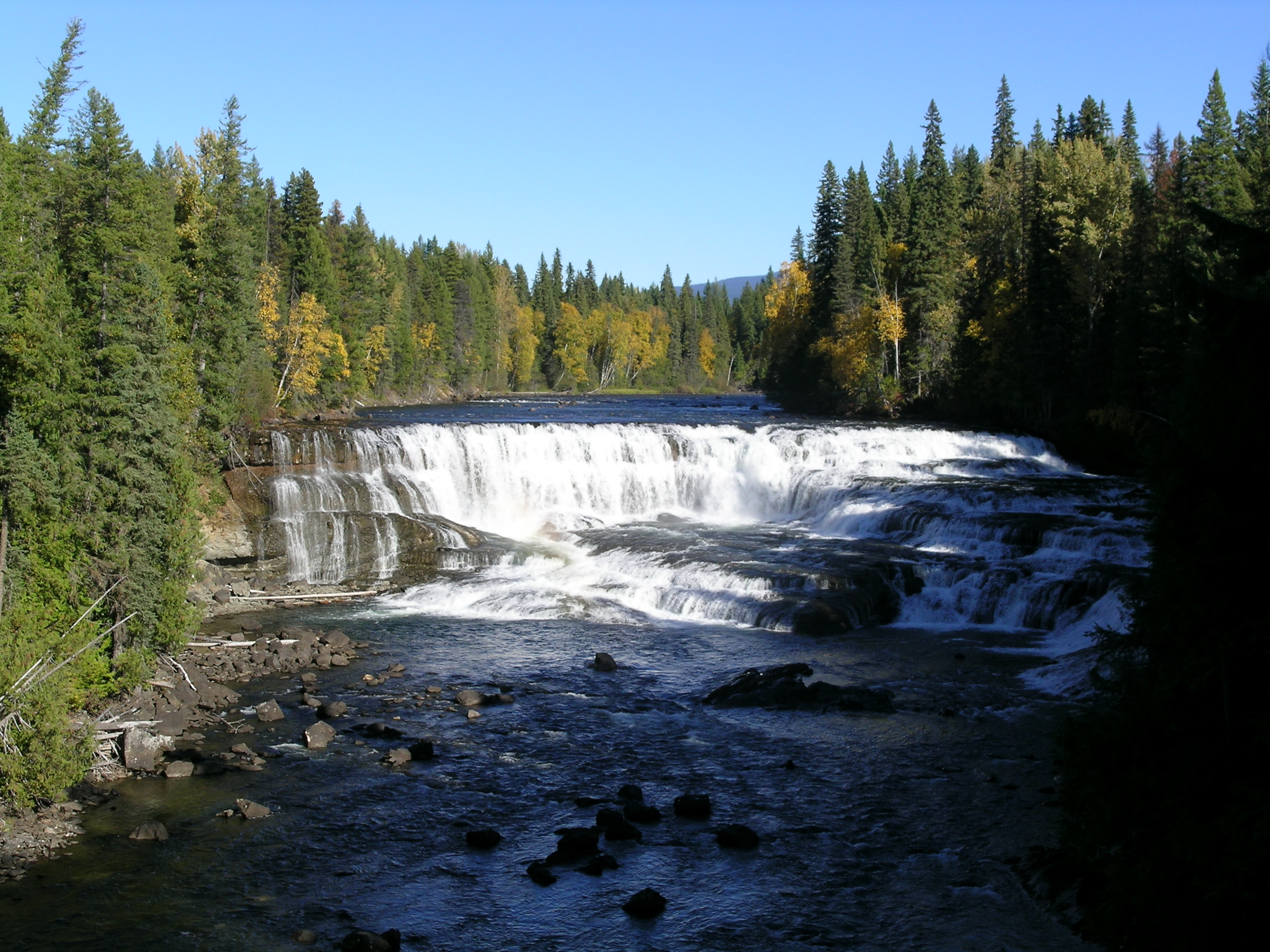
- Interactive map of Dawson Falls
- Location: Wells Gray Provincial Park, British Columbia, Canada
- Coordinates: 51°58′00″N 120°07′00″W
- Type: Block
- Total height: 18 metres (59 ft)
- Number of drops: 1
- Total width: 107 metres (351 ft)
- Average width: 91 metres (299 ft)
- Run: 30 m (98 ft)
- Watercourse: Murtle River
- Average flow rate: 107 m^{3}/s (3,800 cu ft/s)

Dawson Falls is one of seven waterfalls on the Murtle River in Wells Gray Provincial Park, British Columbia, Canada.

== Name origin ==
Dawson Falls was named in 1913 by land surveyor Robert Henry Lee after George Herbert Dawson, the Surveyor-General for British Columbia from 1912-1917. Lee and his crew camped near Dawson Falls during the summers of 1913 and 1914 while they surveyed homesteaders' lots along the south side of the Murtle River. On July 24, 1913, Lee was surveying west from Dawson Falls when he discovered Helmcken Falls.

== Description ==
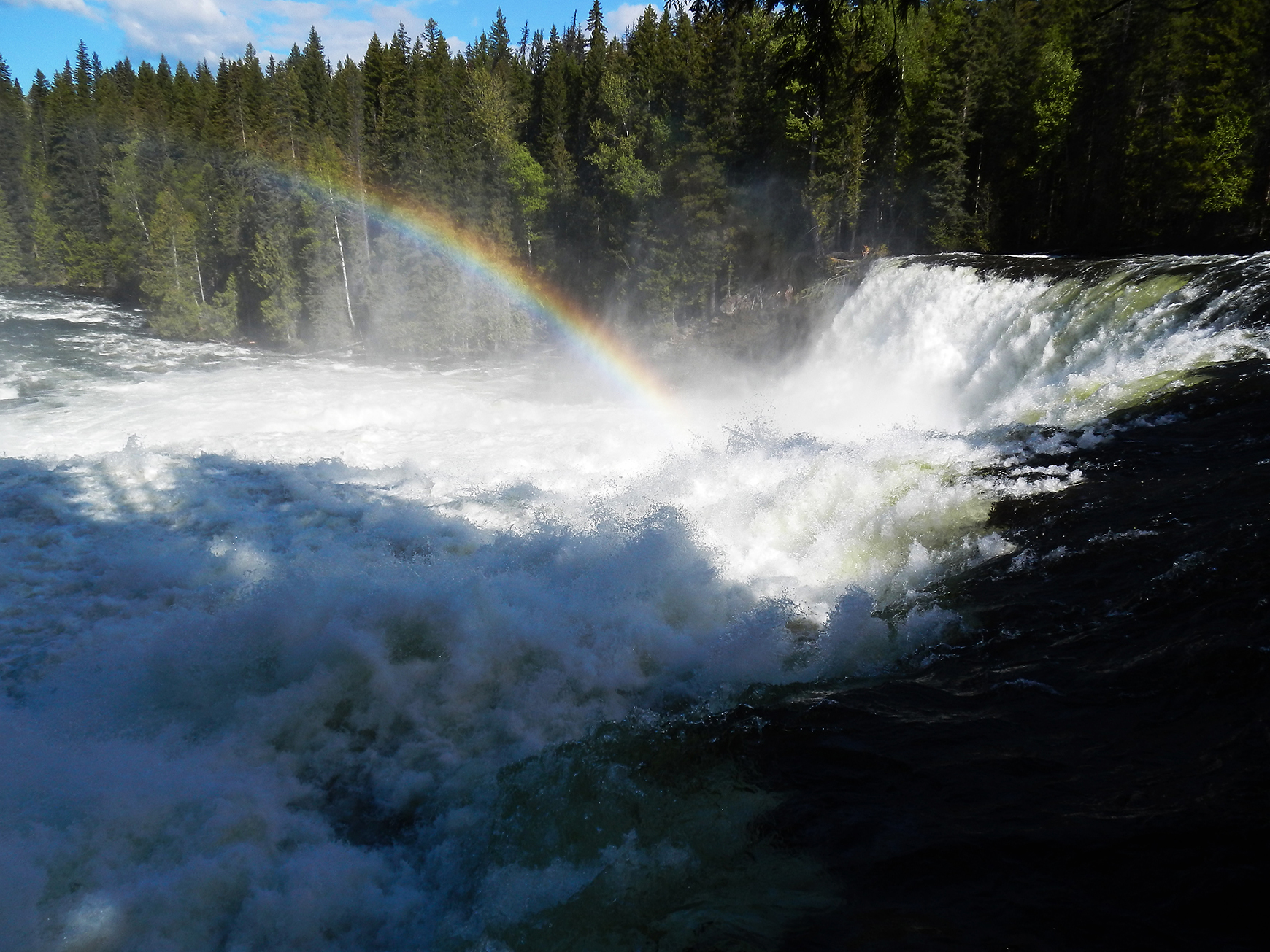
Brink of Dawson Falls

The Wells Gray Park road (Clearwater Valley Road) passes close to Dawson Falls. The main viewpoint is a 10-minute walk and it is another few minutes to the top of the waterfall. A rough trail on the north side of the Murtle River provides a different vantage point. Pyramid Campground, one of four campgrounds in Wells Gray Park, is just northeast of Dawson Falls and has 50 sites.

At Dawson Falls, the Murtle River drops over lava flows that date to about 200,000 years ago. Below the lava are compacted sand and gravel deposits left by a river that predated the eruption.

The Mushbowl is located 600 m (1,969 ft) downstream from Dawson Falls. The Murtle River drops 5 m (16 ft) here and is split by a central rock. The waterfall is located here because of Cambrian rock which has resisted erosion. The Wells Gray Park road bridges the Murtle River at The Mushbowl. The swirling water has eroded a small cave into the cliff on the south side of The Mushbowl and it can be entered at low water from July onwards. The Mushbowl's name was given to this waterfall prior to 1940 and it is a good description of the water's action. Until the late 1960s, a second name "Devil's Punchbowl" was sometimes heard, but was phased out because The Mushbowl is a unique name.

== See also ==
- List of waterfalls in British Columbia
- Clearwater River
- Majerus Falls
- Spahats Falls
