= Pyramid Peak =

Pyramid Peak may refer to several places:

== United States ==
- Pyramid Peak (Alaska)
- Pyramid Peak (Unalaska Island) (651 m), in Alaska
- Pyramid Peak (El Dorado County, California) (3,043 m)
- Pyramid Peak (Fresno County, California) (3,895 m)
- Pyramid Peak (Inyo County, California) (2,044 m)
- Pyramid Peak (Colorado) (4,275 m)
- Pyramid Peak (Custer County, Idaho) (3,544 m)
- Pyramid Peak (Montana) (2,487 m), in Glacier National Park, Montana
- Pyramid Peak (Nevada) (3,633 m)
- Pyramid Peak (New Mexico) (1,827 m)
- Pyramid Peak (Whatcom County, Washington) (2,189m)
- Pyramid Mountain (Clallam County, Washington) (945 m)
- Pyramid Peak (King County, Washington) (1,721 m)
- Pyramid Peak (Pierce County, Washington) (2,114 m)

== New Zealand ==
- Pyramid Peak (Southland) (2,295 m)
- Pyramid Peak (Manawatu-Wanganui) (2,645 m)

== Antarctic ==
- Pyramid Peak (South Georgia) (485 m)
- Pyramid Peak (Victoria Land) (2,565 m)

== See also ==
- Pyramid Mountain (disambiguation)
- Pyramidal peak
- Pyramid Rock (New Mexico)
- The Pyramids (New Zealand), a rock formation in Otago
