= Pyramid Mountain (Kodiak Island) =

Mountain in Alaska, United States

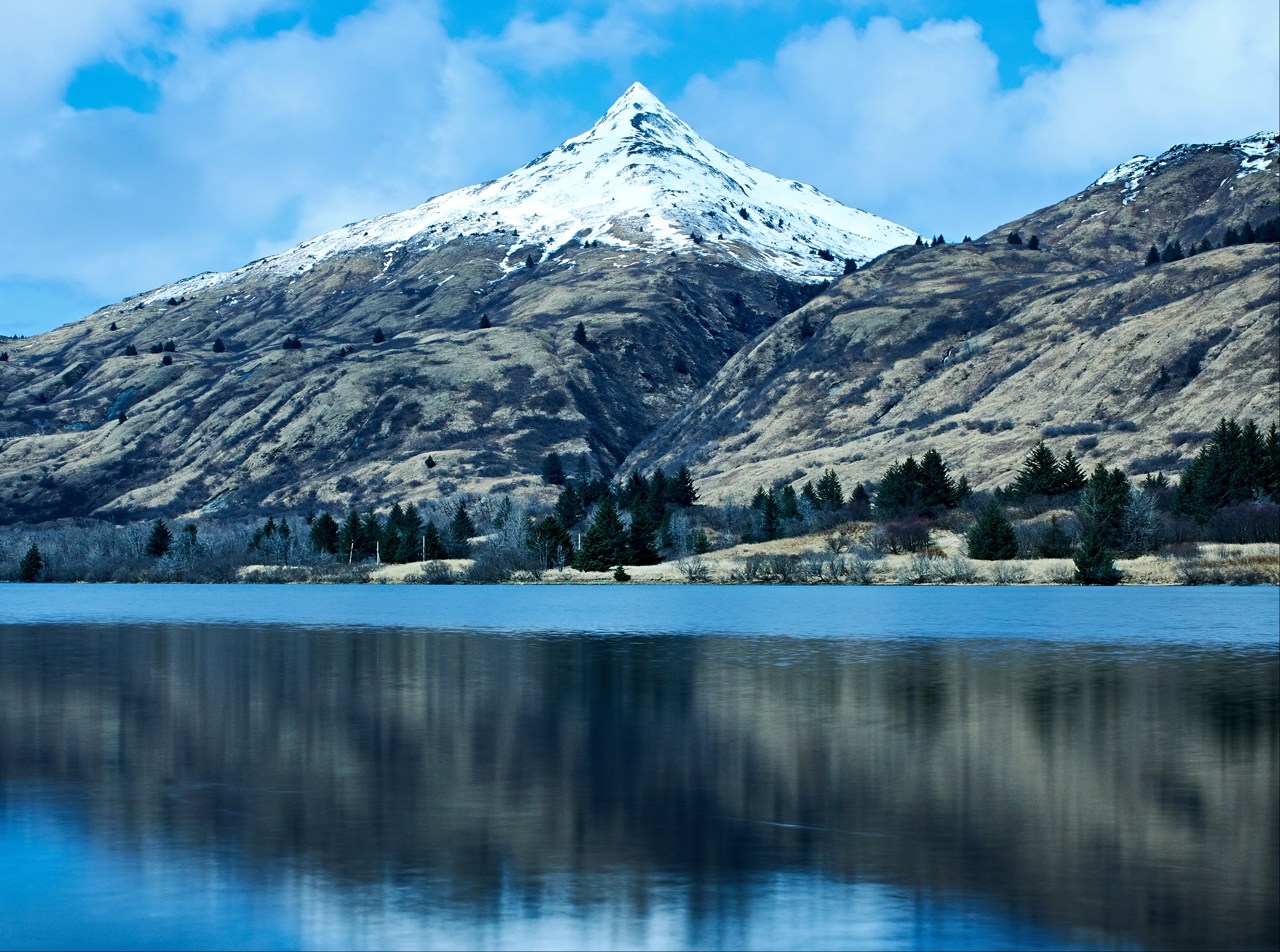
- Southeast aspect from Buskin Lake

Highest point
- Elevation: 2,395 ft (730 m)
- Prominence: 1,903 ft (580 m)
- Isolation: 2.24 mi (3.60 km)
- Coordinates: 57°48′09″N 152°34′36″W

Geography
- Location within Alaska
- Interactive map of Pyramid Mountain
- Location: Kodiak Island Borough; Alaska, United States
- Parent range: Kodiak Archipelago
- Topo map: USGS Kodiak D-2

Climbing
- Easiest route: Trail

Pyramid Mountain is a 2,395-foot (730 m) elevation mountain summit located on Kodiak Island in the US state of Alaska. The mountain is situated 7.5 mi (12 km) west of Kodiak. Although modest in elevation, relief is significant since the peak rises over 2,300 feet above Buskin Lake in only 1.5 mi (2 km). This peak's descriptive name was first published in 1943 by the United States Coast and Geodetic Survey.

== Climate ==
Based on the Köppen climate classification, Pyramid Mountain is located in a subpolar oceanic climate zone with cold winters and cool summers. Weather systems coming off the North Pacific are forced upwards by the mountains (orographic lift), causing heavy precipitation in the form of rainfall and snowfall. Winter temperatures can drop to 0 °F with wind chill factors below −10 °F. Summer months offer the most favorable weather for climbing the peak via an established two-mile trail.

== Gallery ==
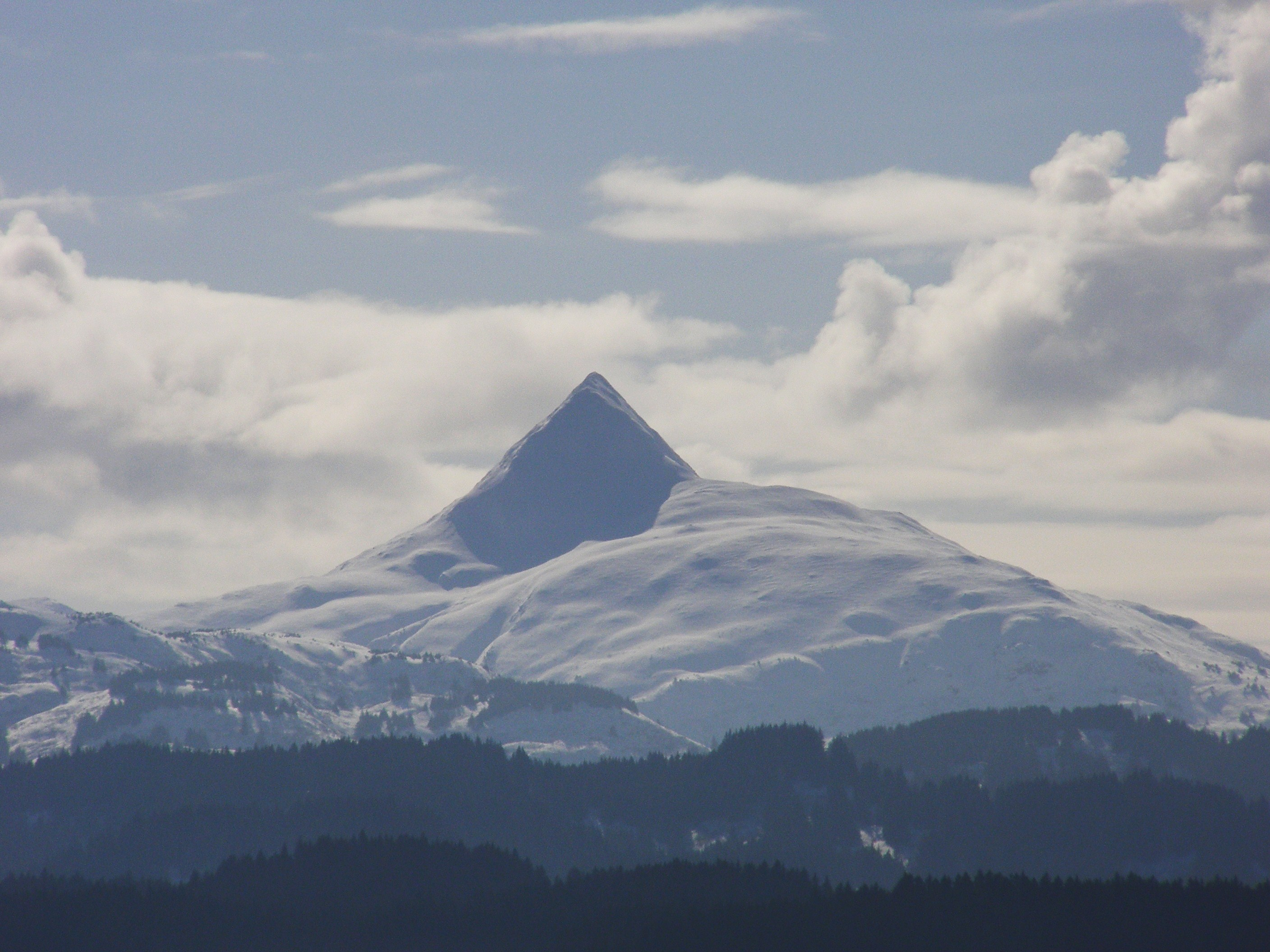
Pyramid Mountain

== See also ==
- List of mountain peaks of Alaska
- Geography of Alaska
