= Pyramidal peak =

Angular, sharply pointed mountainous peak

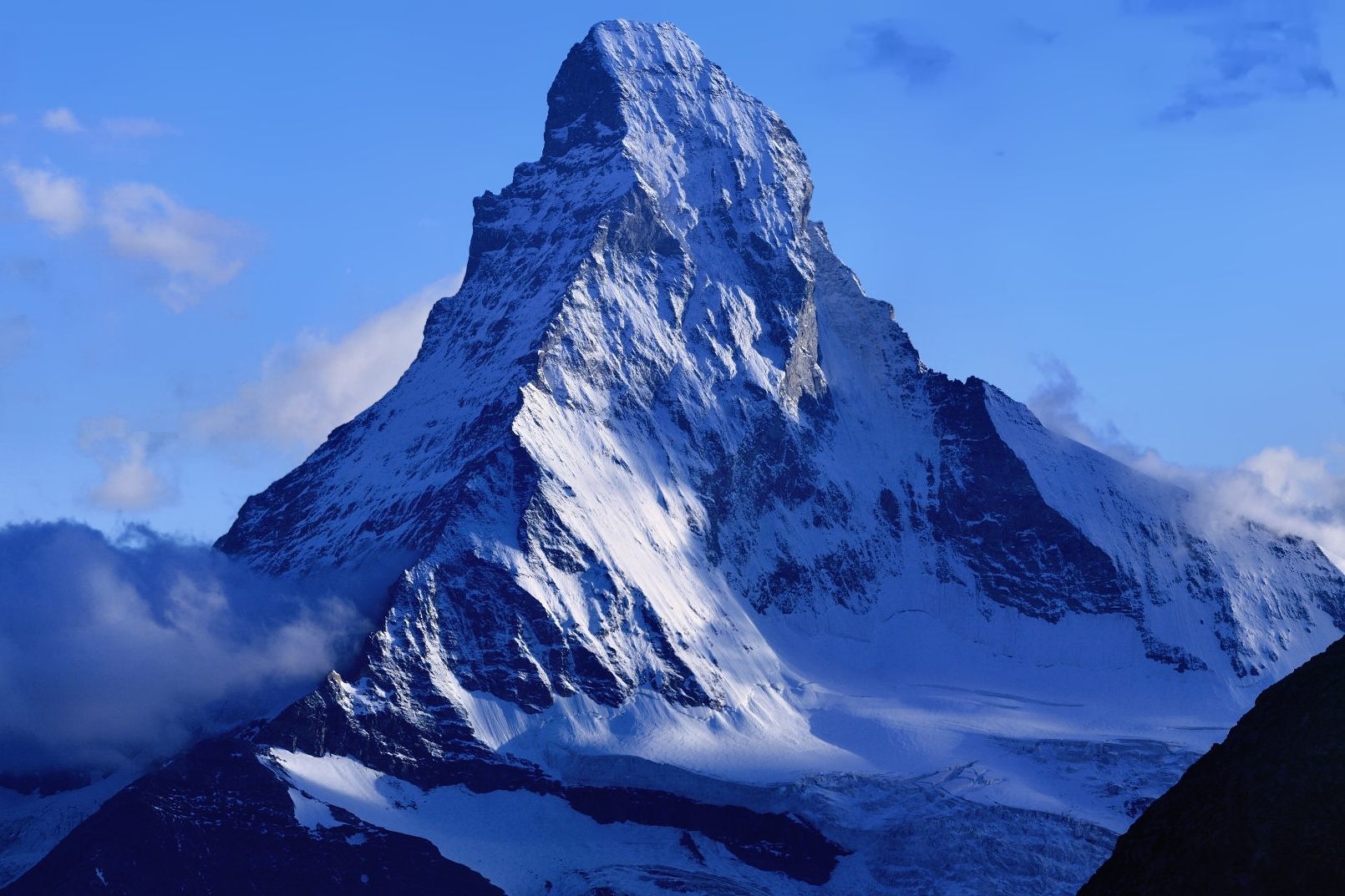
The Matterhorn, a classic example of a pyramidal peak.

A pyramidal peak, sometimes called a glacial horn in extreme cases, is an angular, sharply pointed mountain peak which results from cirque erosion caused by multiple glaciers diverging from a central point. Pyramidal peaks are often examples of nunataks.

== Formation ==
Cross-section of cirque erosion over time

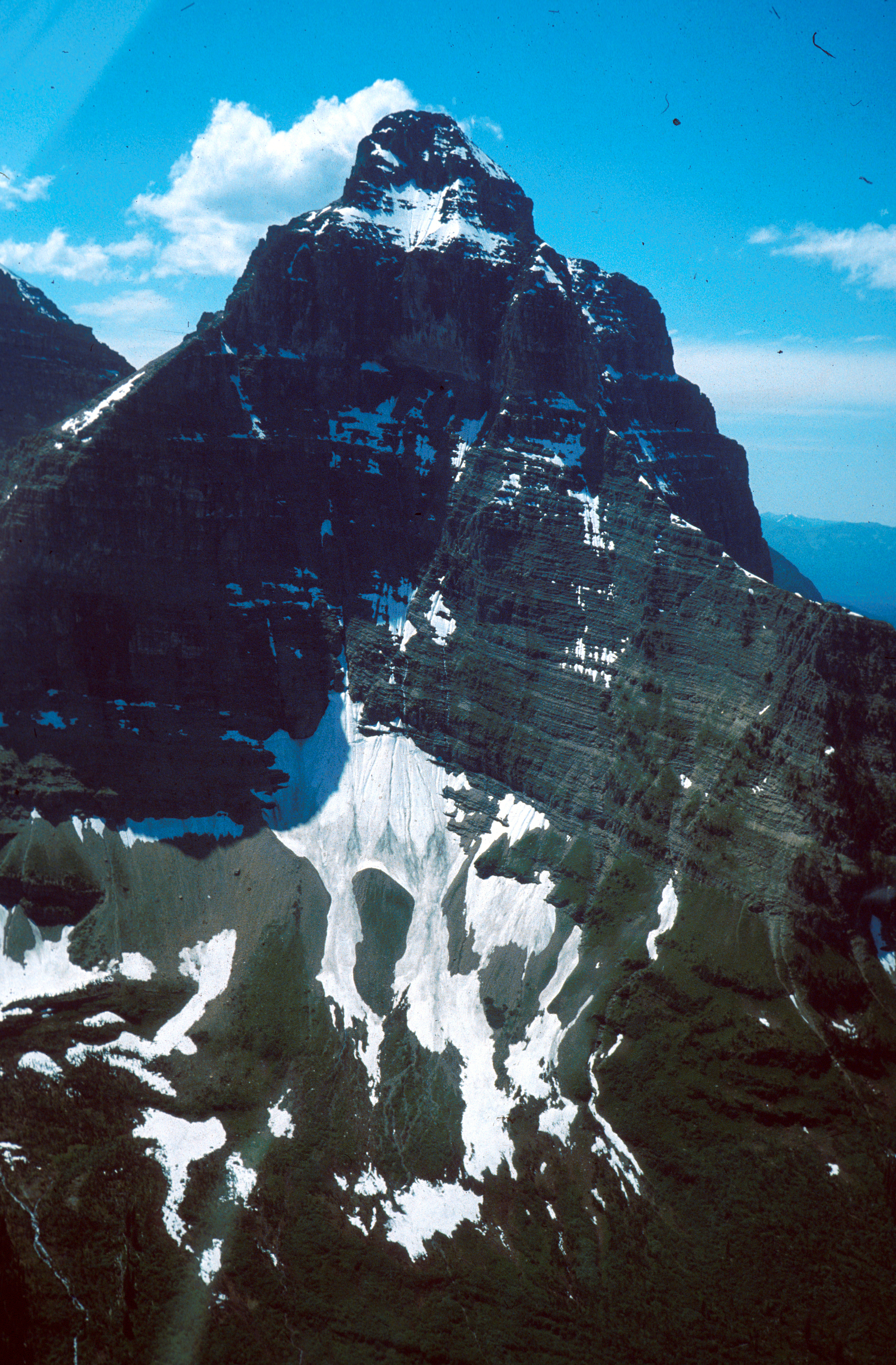
Kinnerly Peak in Glacier National Park in the U.S. state of Montana

Glaciers, typically forming in drainages on the sides of a mountain, develop bowl-shaped basins called cirques (sometimes called 'corries' – from Scottish Gaelic coire [kʰəɾə] (a bowl) – or cwms). Cirque glaciers have rotational sliding that abrades the floor of the basin more than walls and that causes the bowl shape to form. As cirques are formed by glaciation in an alpine environment, the headwall and ridges between parallel glaciers called arêtes become more steep and defined. This occurs due to freeze/thaw and mass wasting beneath the ice surface. It is widely held idea by geographers that a common cause for headwall steepening and extension headward is the crevasses known as bergschrund that occur between the moving ice and the headwall. Plucking and shattering can be seen here by those exploring the crevasses. A cirque is exposed when the glacier that created it recedes.

When three or more of these cirques converge on a central point, they create a pyramid-shaped peak with steep walls. These horns are a common shape for mountain tops in highly glaciated areas. The number of faces of a horn depends on the number of cirques involved in the formation of the peak: three to four is most common. Horns with more than four faces include the Weissmies and the Mönch. A peak with four symmetrical faces is called a Matterhorn (after the Matterhorn, a mountain in the Alps).

The peak of a glacial horn will often outlast the arêtes on its flanks. As the rock around it erodes, the horn gains in prominence. Eventually, a glacial horn will have near vertical faces on all sides. In the Alps, "horn" is also the name of very exposed peaks with slope inclinations of 45–60° (e.g. Kitzbüheler Horn).

== Examples ==
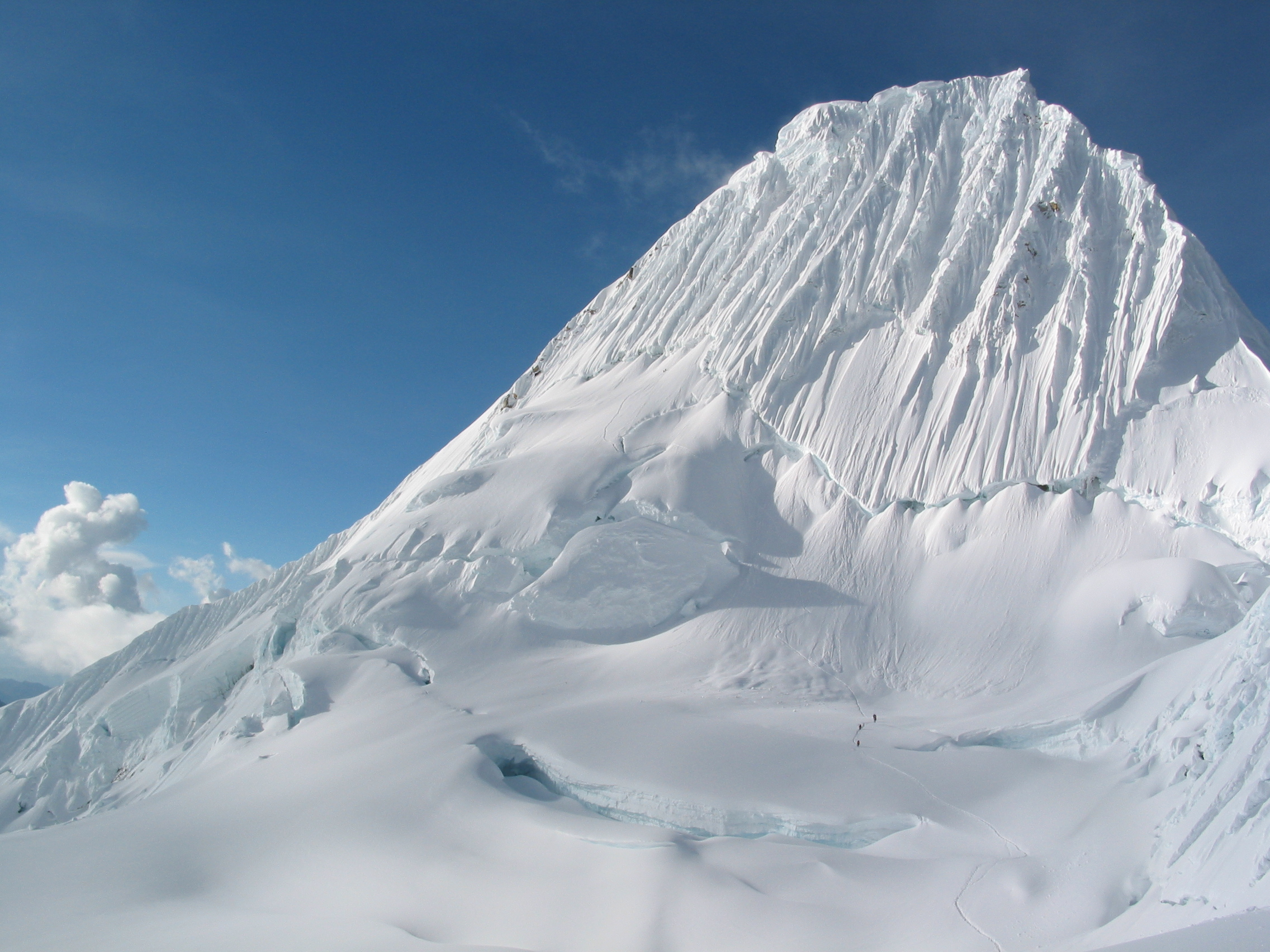
Alpamayo in Huascarán National Park, Peru

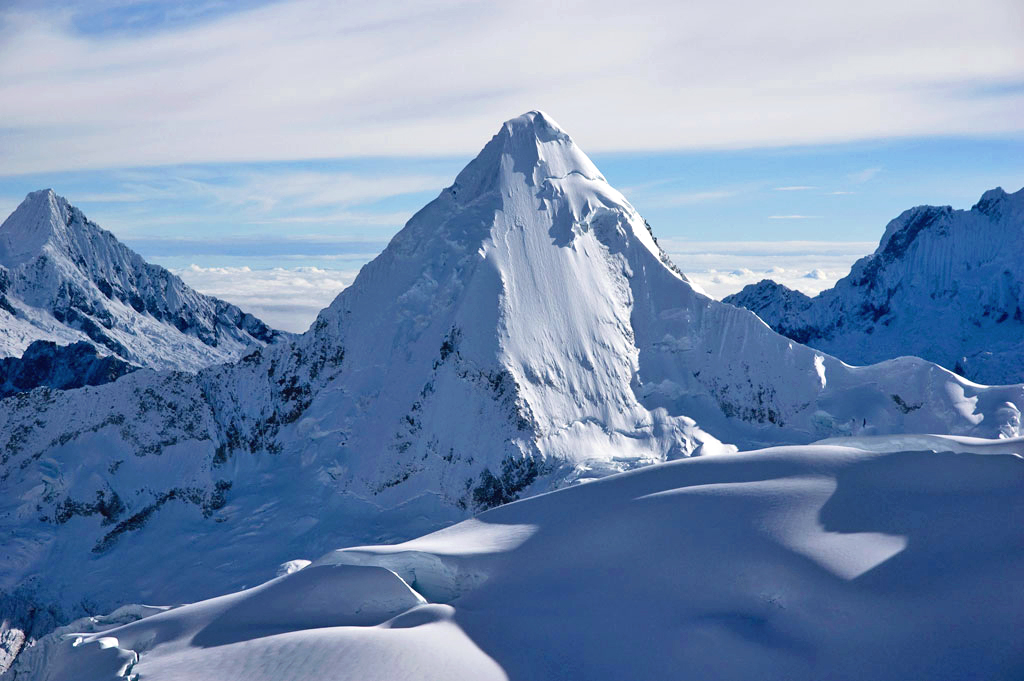
Artesonraju in Huascarán National Park, Peru

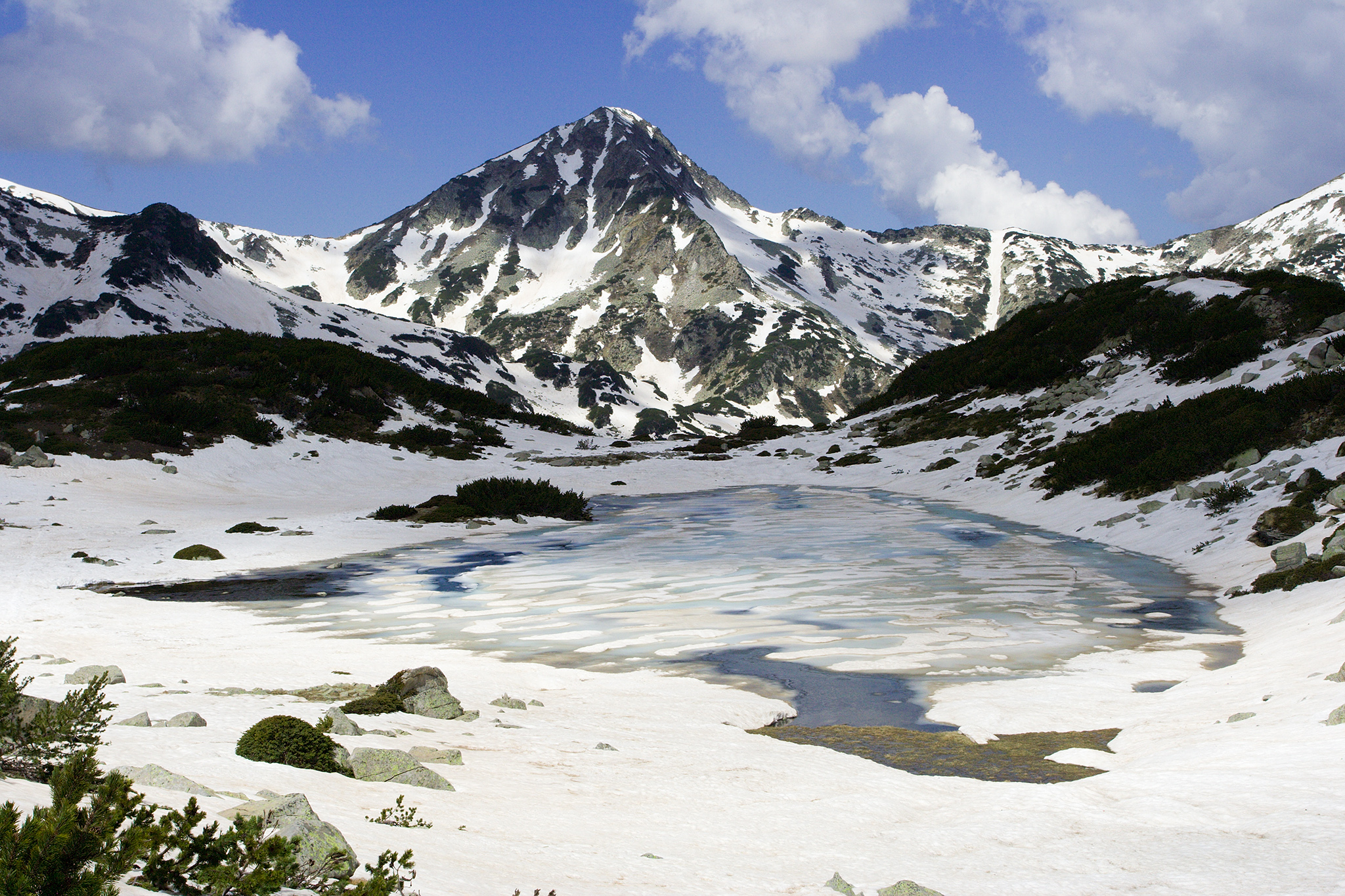
Muratov peak, Pirin Mountain, Bulgaria

- Alpamayo in Ancash, Peru
- Artesonraju in Ancash, Peru
- Belalakaya, Greater Caucasus, Russia
- Crowsnest Mountain in Alberta, Canada
- Errigal in County Donegal, Ireland
- Fitz Roy in Patagonia, South America
- Grand Teton in Grand Teton National Park, Wyoming, United States
- Ice Peak in British Columbia, Canada
- K2 in China and Pakistan
- Makalu in Nepal and China
- Mount Gongga in Sichuan, China
- Kamenitsa, Pirin Mountain, Bulgaria
- Ketil in Greenland
- Khan Tengri in Kazakhstan, Kyrgyzstan and China
- Kinnerly Peak in Glacier National Park, Montana, United States
- The Kitzsteinhorn in Salzburg, Austria
- The Matterhorn in Italy and Switzerland
- Momin Dvor, Pirin Mountain, Bulgaria
- Mount Aspiring/Tititea in Otago, New Zealand
- Mount Assiniboine in British Columbia, Canada
- Mount Thielsen in Oregon, United States
- Mount Wilbur in Glacier National Park, Montana, United States
- Mount Yari in the Chūbu-Sangaku National Park, Japan
- Nevado Las Agujas in Los Ríos, Chile
- Nevado Pirámide in Peru
- Pilot Peak in Wyoming, United States
- Puy Mary in Cantal, France
- Pyramiden in Greenland
- Reynolds Mountain in Glacier National Park, Montana, United States
- Shivling in Uttarakhand, India
- Stob Dearg in Glen Coe, Scotland
- Store Skagastølstind in Sogn og Fjordane, Norway
- The Horn in Victoria, Australia
- The Pyramid in Antarctica
- The Pyramid in British Columbia, Canada
- Snowdon in Snowdonia, Wales
- Vihren, Pirin Mountain, Bulgaria

== See also ==
- Glacial landforms
- Pyramid Peak (disambiguation)

== Bibliography ==
- Easterbrook, Don J. (1999). Surface Processes and Landforms (2nd ed.). Upper Saddle River, NJ: Prentice Hall. pp. 334–336. ISBN 978-0138609580.
