= Pyramid Mountain (Alaska Range) =

Mountain in Alaska, United States

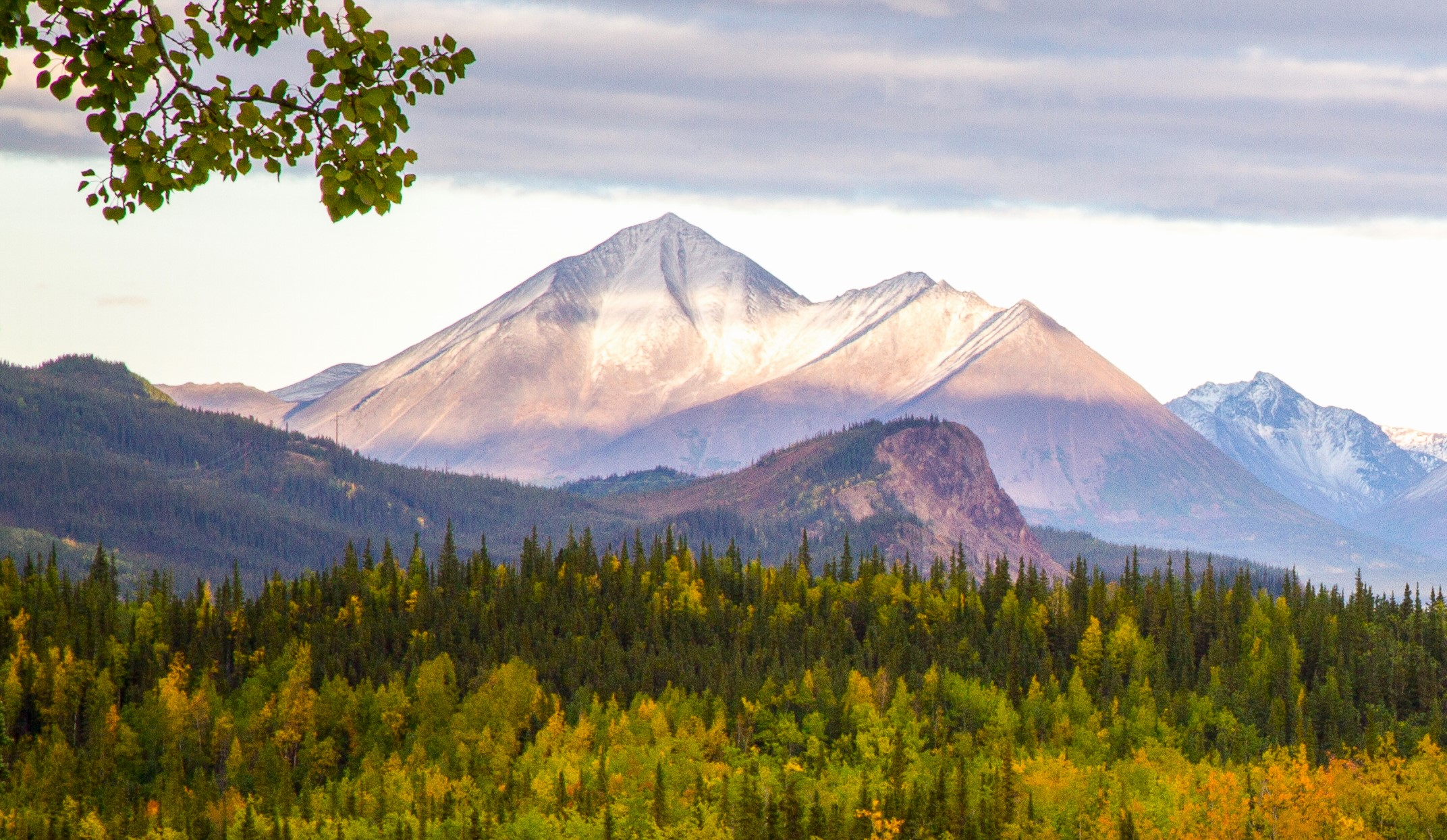
- Northwest aspect

Highest point
- Elevation: 5,519 ft (1,682 m)
- Prominence: 2,069 ft (631 m)
- Isolation: 4.48 mi (7.21 km)
- Coordinates: 63°38′22″N 148°30′54″W

Geography
- Location within Alaska
- Interactive map of Pyramid Mountain
- Country: United States
- State: Alaska
- Borough: Denali
- Parent range: Alaska Range
- Topo map: USGS Healy C-4

Pyramid Mountain is a 5,519-foot-elevation (1,682-meter) mountain summit in Alaska, United States.

== Description ==
Pyramid Mountain is located 12 miles (19 km) southeast of Denali National Park headquarters and 8.5 miles (13.7 km) southeast of Mount Fellows in the Alaska Range. Precipitation runoff from the mountain drains into tributaries of the Nenana River, which in turn is part of the Tanana River drainage basin. Although modest in elevation, topographic relief is significant as the summit rises over 3,000 feet (914 m) above Moose Creek in 1.3 miles (2.1 km). The mountain's local descriptive name was reported in 1950 by the USGS, and the toponym has been officially adopted by the United States Board on Geographic Names.

== Climate ==
Based on the Köppen climate classification, Pyramid Mountain is located in a subarctic climate zone with long, cold, snowy winters, and mild summers. Winter temperatures can drop below 0 °F with wind chill factors below −20 °F. The months May through June offer the most favorable weather for viewing.

== See also ==
- List of mountain peaks of Alaska
- Geography of Alaska
