= Murtle Lake =

Lake in British Columbia, Canada

- Location within British Columbia
- Location: British Columbia
- Coordinates: 52°9′00″N 119°40′00″W
- Primary inflows: Murtle River, File Creek, Anderson Creek, Strait Creek
- Primary outflows: Murtle River
- Basin countries: Canada
- Max. length: 30 km (19 mi)
- Max. width: 1 km (0.6 mi) to 4 km (2.5 mi)
- Surface area: 76.3 km^{2} (29.5 sq mi)
- Average depth: 107 m (351 ft)
- Max. depth: 333 m (1,093 ft)
- Water volume: 8.16 km^{3} (1.96 cu mi)
- Shore length^{1}: 107.5 km (66.8 mi)
- Surface elevation: 1,067 m (3,501 ft)
- Islands: 4
- Settlements: None
- ^{1} Shore length is not a well-defined measure.

Murtle Lake is a lava dammed lake located in Wells Gray Provincial Park, east-central British Columbia, Canada. It is fed primarily by the Murtle River which rises from a large unnamed glacier in the Cariboo Mountains at an elevation of 2,300 m (7,546 ft) and flows southwest for 18 km (11 mi) to the lake. The Murtle River also drains Murtle Lake then flows southwest for 36 km (22 mi) into the Clearwater River.

Murtle Lake looks like a reversed letter 'L' with two arms. The North Arm extends fjord-like deep into the Cariboo Mountains. The West Arm, which attracts the most visitors, has extensive sandy beaches, many coves and three islands. The Wavy Range rises above the east shore of the north arm. Central Mountain occupies the bend between the two arms. The valley of Stevens Lakes extends to the south towards Battle Mountain.

In 1968, about 40% of Wells Gray Park or 525,680 acres (212,735 ha) was set aside as the Murtle Lake Nature Conservancy and gave this area a high level of protection from development. Two years later, motorboats and aircraft were banned and today Murtle Lake is the largest lake in North America where only canoes and kayaks are allowed.

== Access and trails ==
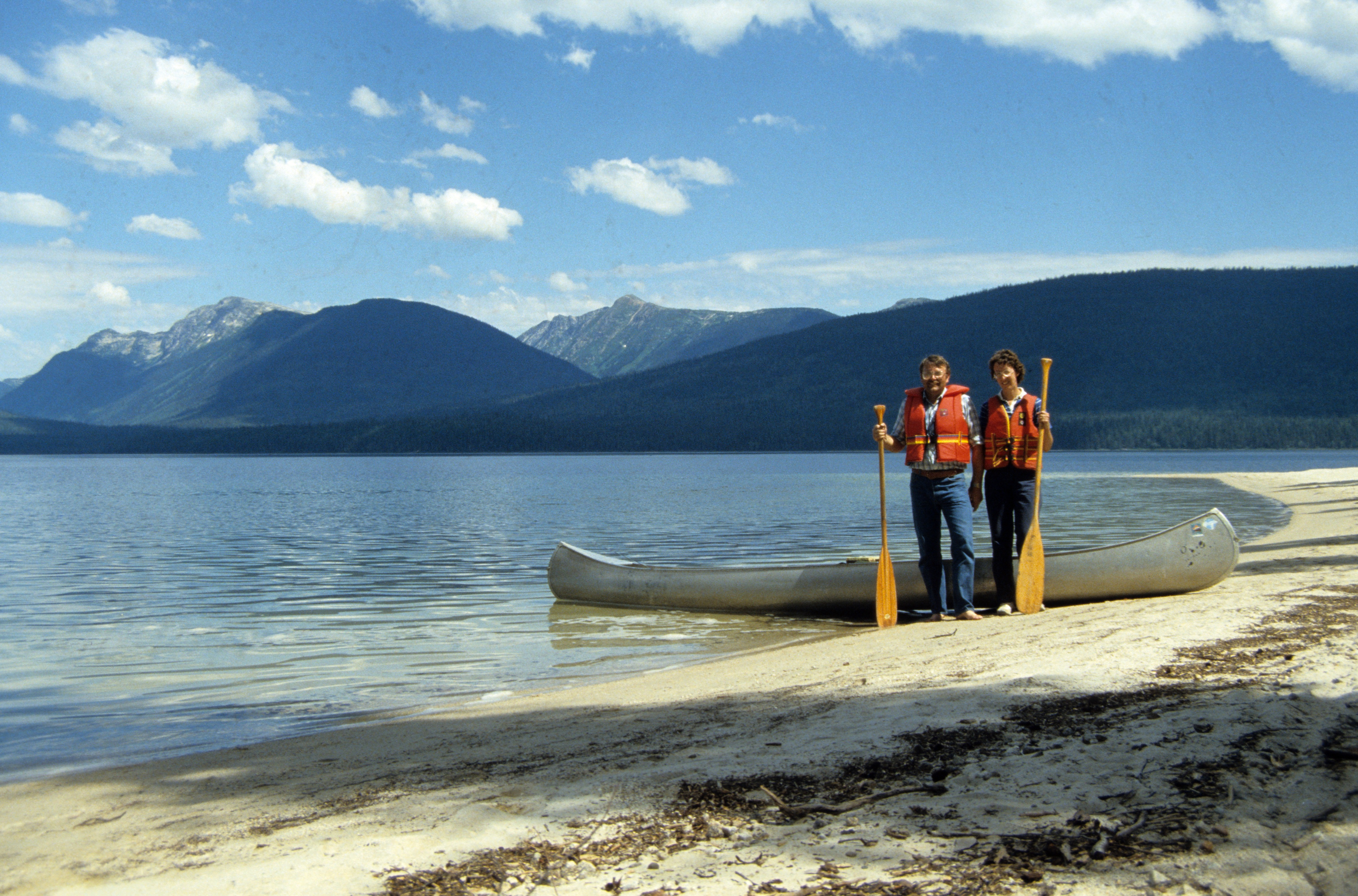
Canoeing in West Arm of Murtle Lake. Wavy Range behind.

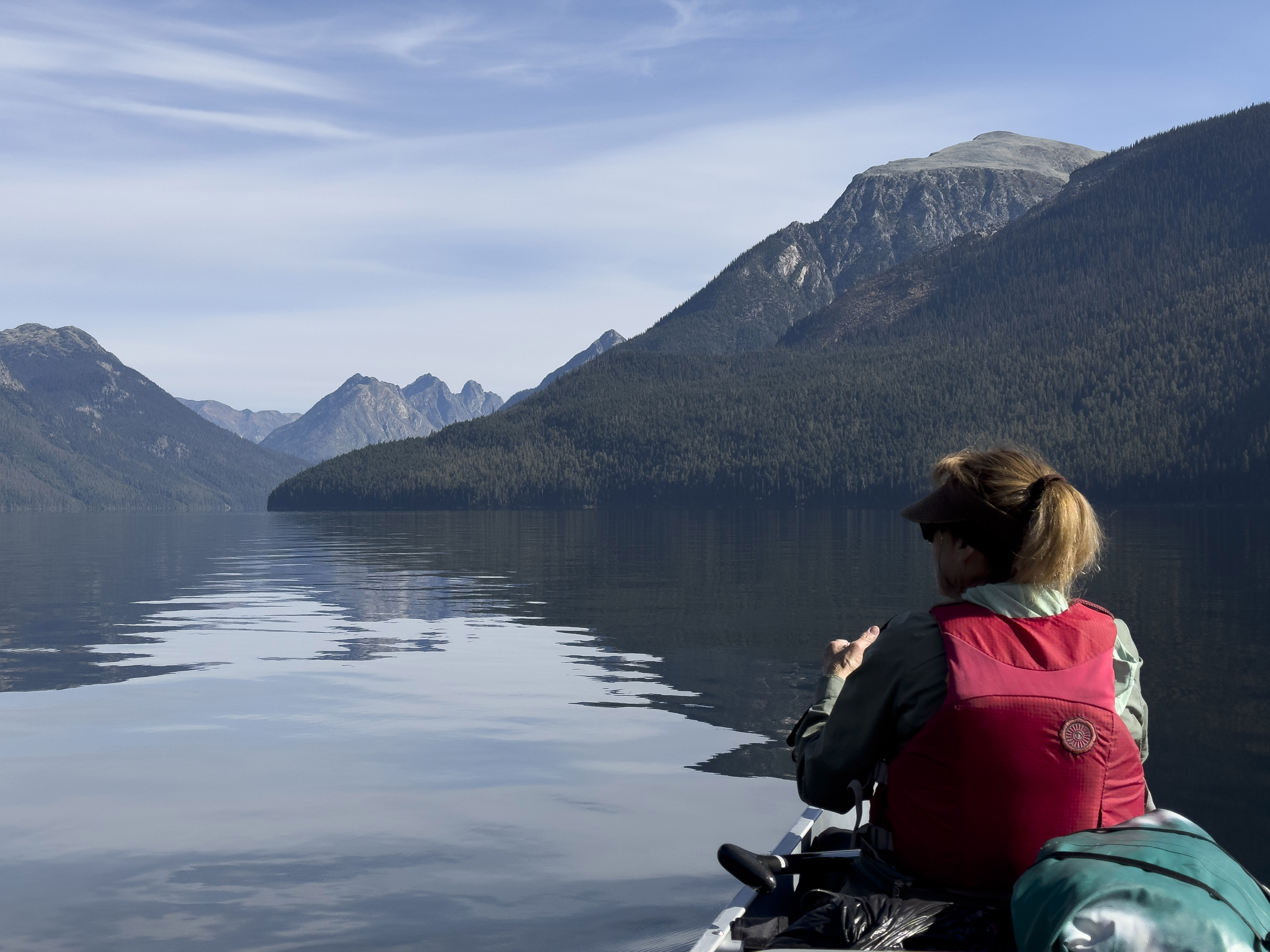
Nearing the end of the North Arm

The only way to get to Murtle Lake is by a 24 km (14.9 mi) road off the Yellowhead Highway at Blue River. It ends at the boundary of Wells Gray Park near Phyllis Lake. From here, visitors must portage a canoe or kayak for 2.5 km (1.6 mi) to the Murtle Lagoon. The trail is wide with a gentle gradient, so many visitors use a canoe cart instead of actually carrying it. Visitors without a canoe can continue on the trail for 1.5 km (0.9 mi) along the north shore of Murtle Lagoon to an extensive sandbar and a view of Murtle Lake itself.

There are 19 designated campsites with 66 spaces along the lakeshore. Visitors are not allowed to camp anywhere else. Review BC Parks regulations prior to your visit.

Eight trails leave the lakeshore: McDougall Falls, File Creek Portage Trail, McDougall Lake route, Anderson Lake, Central Mountain, Henrietta Lake, Strait Lake and Wavy Range. Refer to Exploring Wells Gray Park for detailed descriptions and starting points.

== History and naming ==
The first recorded sighting of the lake was made by Joseph Hunter, a surveyor working for the future Canadian Pacific Railway, on May 27, 1874. Hunter's expedition rafted across the Clearwater River near The Horseshoe, headed east for about 13 km, and reached the Murtle River upstream from Majerus Falls. He named the Murtle River, then Murtle Lake a few days later, for his birthplace in Scotland, Milton of Murtle, near Aberdeen.

Following is the first written description of Murtle Lake, taken from Joseph Hunter's diary: "From the head of the canyon [at McDougall Falls] to Camp 10, 2 1/2 miles...the river is from 175 to 200 feet wide. At Camp 10, where it has become a lake, one-fourth of a mile wide, we crossed on a raft, and travelling down a fine wide valley, due east, for five miles, reached a lake at 3,700 feet, the same altitude as Camp 10. I soon discovered that we had crossed an arm of this (Murtle Lake) early in the morning...It is enclosed on the east by low green hills; on the north the mountains are bold, high and rugged. On the south, the most important in case a line of railway should come this way, the mountains are steep but not rough, and generally keep well away from the lake, leaving a margin of hard, firm, level ground along the shore."

Hunter's expedition explored around Murtle Lake for four days and left via the low pass to the east. They reached the North Thompson River near Blue River on June 2.

Between 1872 and 1881, about 20 survey parties fanned out across British Columbia trying to find the best route for the new railway between Yellowhead Pass in the Rocky Mountains and the Pacific Coast. Three survey parties visited what is now Wells Gray Park. When the more southern Kicking Horse Pass was chosen instead in 1881, all of these meticulously examined routes across the Canadian Cordilleran, including Hunter's, were abandoned. Only three place names in the Park recognize those 10 wasted years of surveys: Murtle River & Lake, Mahood River & Lake, and Marcus Falls. The latter two refer to James Adam Mahood and Marcus Smith, leaders of two other railway surveys during the 1870s.

== See also ==
- List of lakes of British Columbia
