= Pyramid Mountain (Wells Gray-Clearwater) =

Subglacial mound in British Columbia, Canada

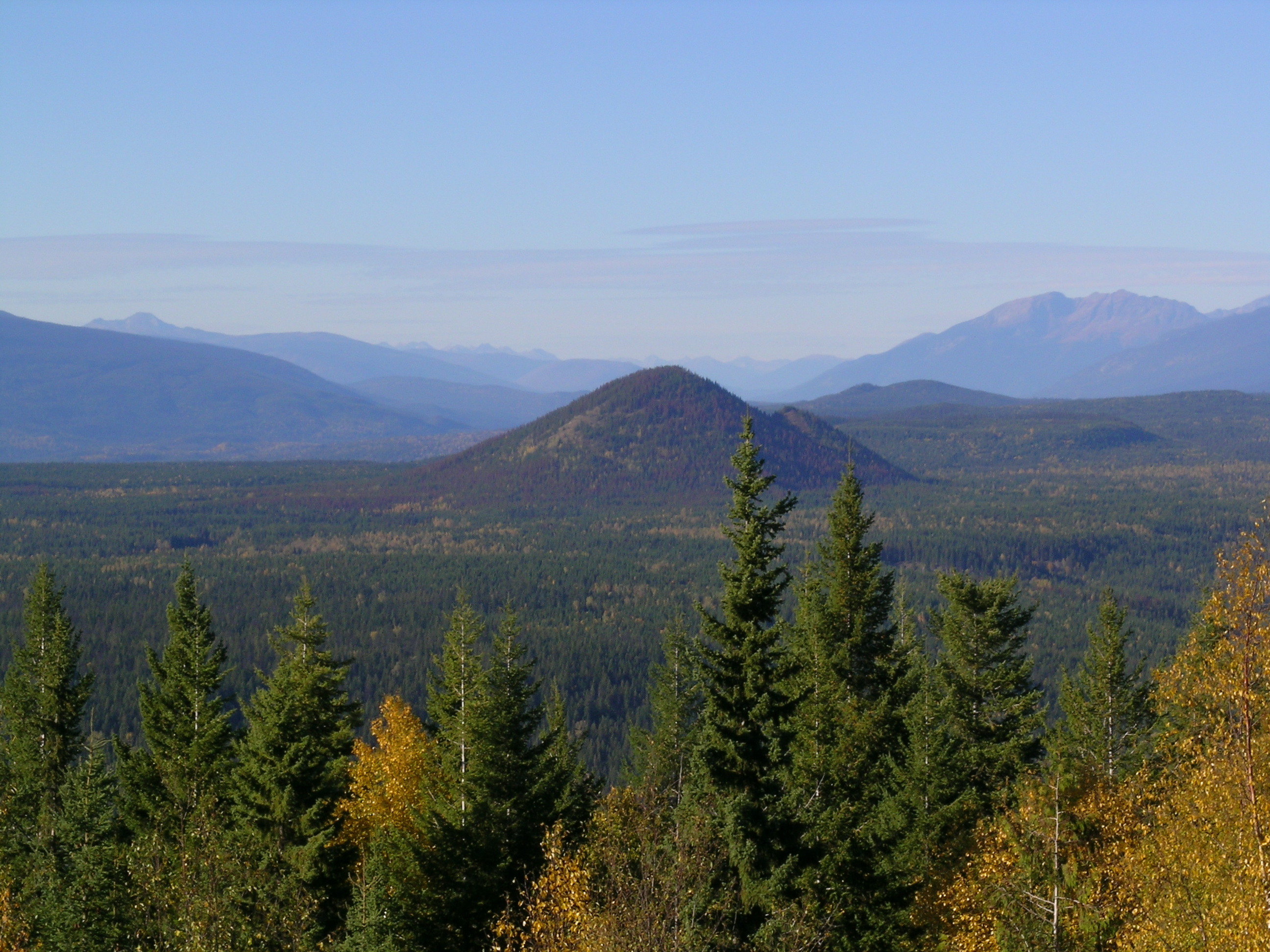
- Pyramid Mountain, Sept. 2006

Highest point
- Elevation: 1,094 m (3,589 ft)
- Prominence: 227 m (745 ft)
- Coordinates: 51°59′40″N 120°06′16″W

Geography
- Location within British Columbia
- Interactive map of Pyramid Mountain
- Location: British Columbia, Canada
- District: Kamloops Division Yale Land District
- Topo map: NTS 92P16 Mahood Lake

Geology
- Rock age: Pleistocene
- Mountain type: Subglacial mound
- Volcanic field: Wells Gray-Clearwater volcanic field
- Last eruption: 12,000 years ago

Climbing
- Easiest route: Trail off Majerus Falls trail

Pyramid Mountain is a subglacial mound located on the Murtle Plateau in Wells Gray Provincial Park, east-central British Columbia, Canada.

== Formation ==
Pyramid Mountain erupted about 12,000 years ago. It was once mistaken for a cinder cone and is now known to have erupted underneath about 1,600 m (5,249 ft) of glacial ice. The volcano erupted vigorously and cooled rapidly when the hot lava contacted the surrounding ice and melted it, creating an envelope of water around the rising volcano. The result was a cement-like surface with smoothed cobbles of granite, schist, phyllite and other non-volcanic pebbles which were carried by the ice from many kilometers distant. As a result of this type of eruption, Pyramid Mountain has no crater and no lava flows stretching away from its base. The secondary cone to the east (best seen from Clearwater Valley Road near Hemp Creek) was not formed by a separate eruption, but was simply a slump when the ice melted away from Pyramid, releasing the pressure against its slopes.

== Access ==
Pyramid Mountain can be viewed from Wells Gray Park roads at three locations:

- Clearwater Valley Road at km 32 at turnoff to Corral Road
- Green Mountain viewing tower (see picture above)
- Clearwater Valley Road at km 39.9 at Majerus Farm trailhead

The trail to the top of Pyramid Mountain starts at Pyramid Campground. It is 5.6 km (3.5 mi) to the summit. The view is mostly southward to Trophy Mountain, Battle Mountain and Dunn Peak. The Murtle River flows along the east and south sides of Pyramid. In some weather conditions, the plume of spray over Helmcken Falls can be seen to the west.

== See also ==
- List of volcanoes in Canada
- Volcanism of Canada
- Volcanism of Western Canada
- Wells Gray-Clearwater volcanic field
- Pyramid Mountain (disambiguation)
