= Joseph Hunter (Canadian politician) =

Canadian politician (1839–1935)

MLA of Cariboo
- In office February 15, 1872 – August 30, 1875
- In office July 19, 1900 – June 16, 1903

MLA of Comox
- In office January 15, 1891 – June 7, 1898

Personal details
- Born: May 7, 1839 Aberdeen, Scotland
- Died: April 8, 1935 (aged 95)
- Party: Independent (1871-1900); Conservative (1900-)

Joseph Hunter (May 7, 1839 – April 8, 1935) was a Scottish-born surveyor, civil engineer and political figure in British Columbia. He represented Cariboo from 1872 to 1875 and from 1900 to 1903 and Comox from 1890 to 1898 in the Legislative Assembly of British Columbia. He was an unsuccessful candidate in the 1898 and 1903 provincial elections.

Hunter was born in Milton of Murtle near Aberdeen in 1839 and educated at the University of Aberdeen. He came to Victoria, British Columbia in 1864. From 1872 to 1874, he worked performing surveys for the future Canadian Pacific Railway including one route across what is now Wells Gray Provincial Park. He discovered and named the Murtle River and Murtle Lake for his birthplace.

In 1875, Hunter was employed by the Canadian government to establish a boundary between the province of British Columbia and the state of Alaska on the Stikine River. In 1883, he became chief engineer for the Esquimalt and Nanaimo Railway; in 1886, he also became general superintendent for that railway. In 1878, Hunter married Frances Ellen, the daughter of John Robson. He died in 1935, aged 94.
