= List of cinder cones =

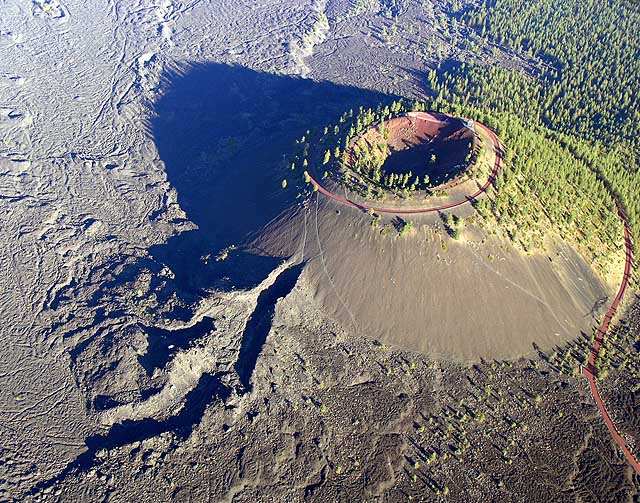
Lava Butte, a cinder cone in Newberry National Volcanic Monument, Oregon.

A list of cinder cones is shown below. The list contains either individual cinder cones, or a group of cinder cones with no other volcanic features.

== Africa ==
=== Democratic Republic of the Congo ===
- Volcan Rumoka

=== Mauritius ===
- Trou aux Cerfs
- Trou Kanaka

== Asia ==
=== Japan ===
- Mount Suribachi, Iwo Jima
- Mount Ōmuro, Izu-Tobu, Honshu

=== Philippines ===
- Smith Volcano
- Mount Mayabobo

=== Russia ===
- Balagan-Tas, Sakha Republic
- Kostakan, Kamchatka Peninsula (multiple cones)
- Ivao Group, Urup Island, Kuril Islands (multiple cones)
- Lomonosov Group, Paramushir Island, Kuril Islands (multiple cones)

== Europe ==
=== France ===
- Puy de la Vache, Chaîne des Puys volcanic field, Auvergne
- Puy de Lassolas, Chaîne des Puys volcanic field, Auvergne

=== Germany ===
- Rockeskyller Kopf, Eifel
- Veitskopf, Eifel

=== Italy ===
- Monte Nuovo, Italy

== North America ==
=== Canada ===
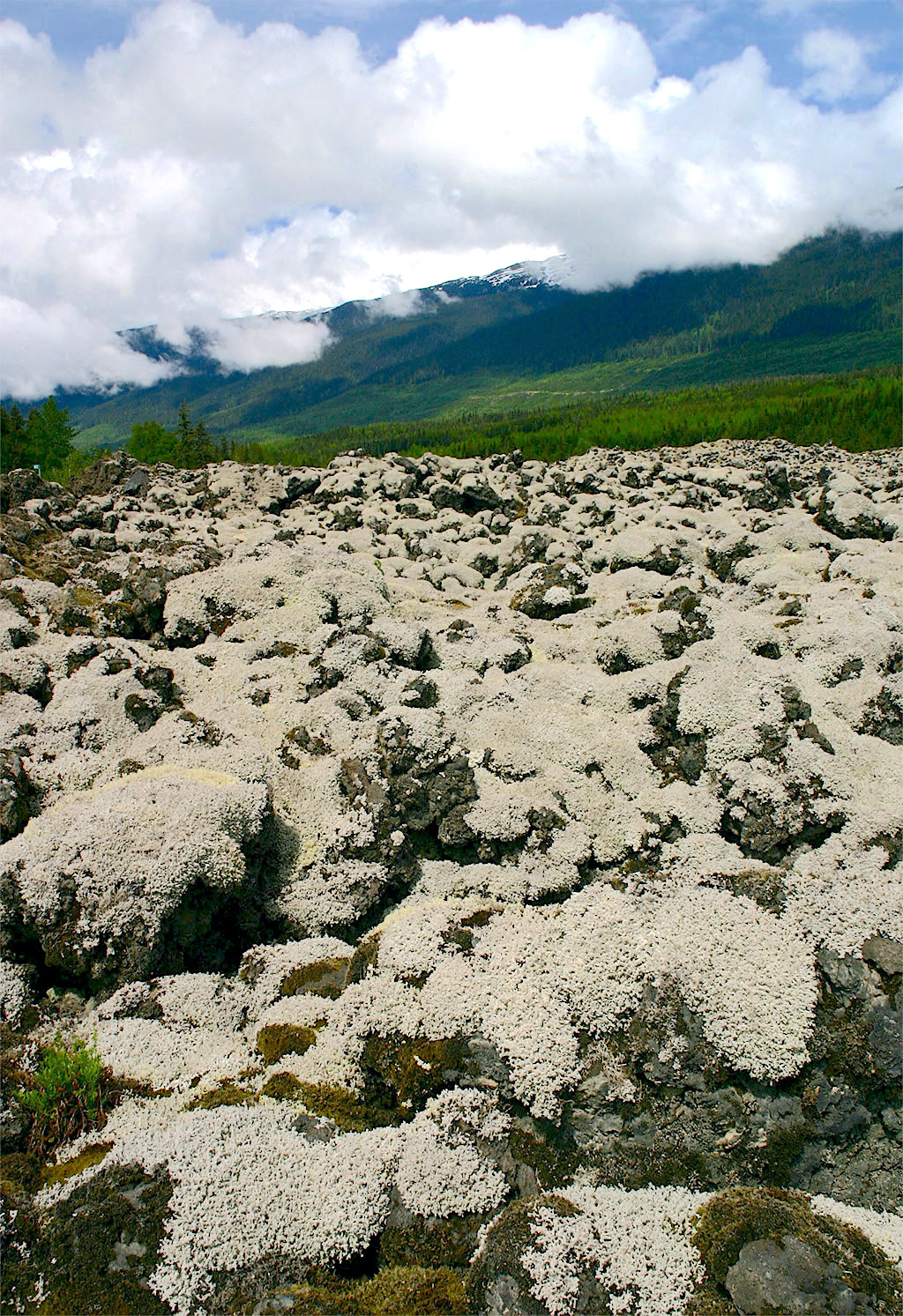
Tseax Cone lava bed covered with moss and lichen

- Atlin Volcanic Field, British Columbia (multiple cones)
- Buck Hill, British Columbia
- Cache Hill, British Columbia
- Camp Hill, British Columbia
- Cinder Cliff, British Columbia
- Cinder Cone, British Columbia
- Cocoa Crater, British Columbia
- Coffee Crater, British Columbia
- Cracker Creek Cone, British Columbia
- Dragon Cone, British Columbia
- Eve Cone, British Columbia
- Flourmill Cone, British Columbia
- Gabrielse Cone, British Columbia
- Ibex Mountain, Yukon
- Kana Cone, British Columbia
- Kitasu Hill, British Columbia
- Kostal Cone, British Columbia
- Machmel River Cone, British Columbia
- Moraine Cone, British Columbia
- Nahta Cone, British Columbia
- Nazko Cone, British Columbia
- Opal Cone, Garibaldi Park, British Columbia
- Pointed Stick Cone, British Columbia
- Ridge Cone, British Columbia
- The Saucer, British Columbia
- Sidas Cone, British Columbia
- Sleet Cone, British Columbia
- Storm Cone, British Columbia
- Triplex Cones, British Columbia
- Tseax Cone, British Columbia
- Twin Cone, British Columbia
- Volcanic Creek Cone, British Columbia
- Volcano Mountain, Yukon
- Williams Cone, British Columbia

=== Mexico ===
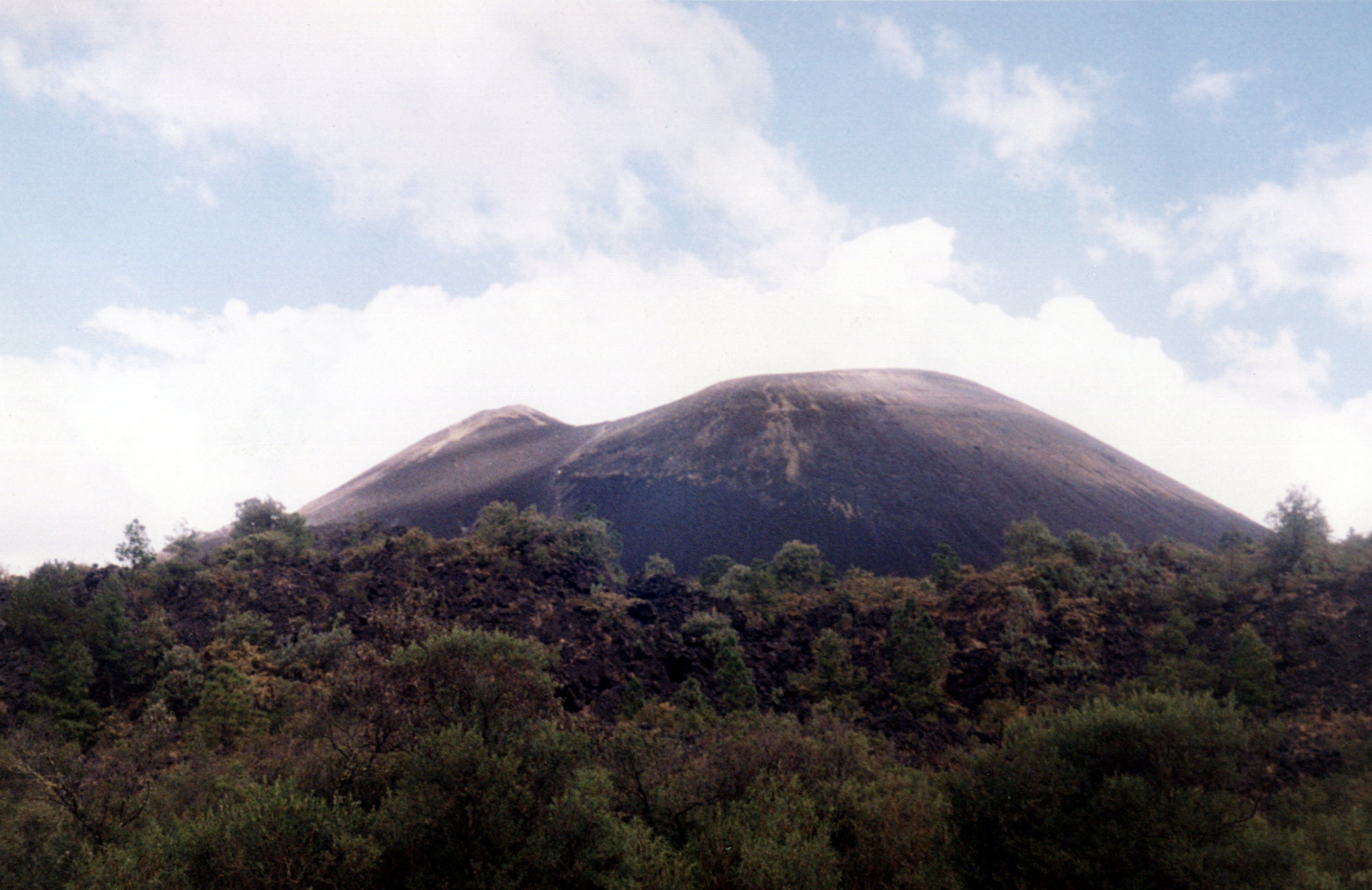
Parícutin in 1994.

- El Jorullo
- Parícutin, Mexico

=== United States ===
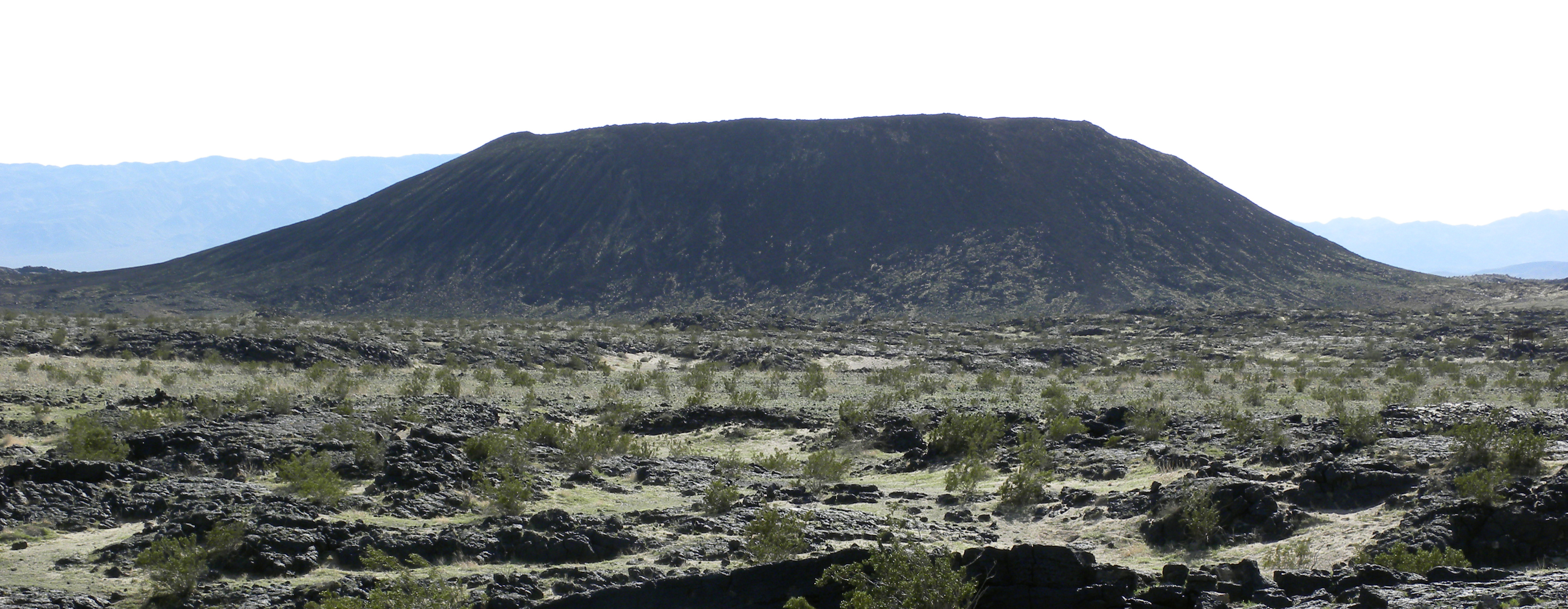
Amboy Crater, as viewed from the east.

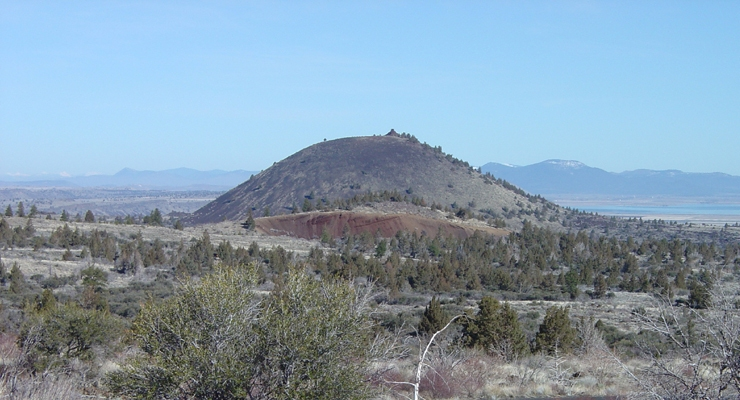
Schonchin Butte from Cave Loop Road.

- Cinder Cone and the Fantastic Lava Beds, California
- Pisgah Crater, California
- Amboy Crater, California
- Schonchin Butte, California
- Twin Buttes, California (multiple cones)
- Capulin Volcano, northeastern New Mexico
- Mount Gordon, Alaska
- Hoodoo Butte, Oregon
- Lava Butte, Oregon
- Mount Talbert, Oregon
- Pilot Butte, Oregon
- Powell Butte, Oregon
- Rocky Butte, Oregon
- Mount Tabor, Oregon
- Wizard Island, Oregon
- Prindle Volcano, Alaska
- Veyo Volcano in Veyo, Utah
- Roden Crater, Arizona
- S P Crater, Arizona
- Sunset Crater, Arizona
- Vulcan's Throne, Arizona
- Tantalus, Hawaii
- Puʻu ʻŌʻō, Hawaii

== Oceania ==
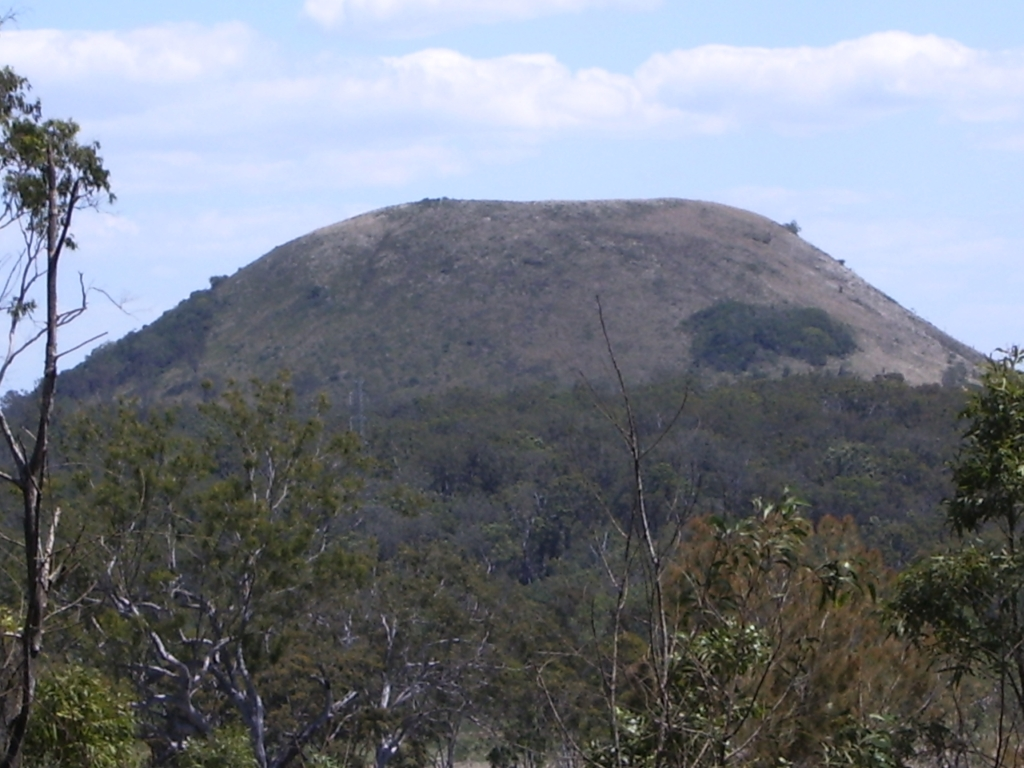
Mount Fox crater.

=== Australia ===
- Mount Leura, Victoria
- Mount Fox, Queensland
- Mount Elephant, Victoria

=== New Zealand ===
- Maungakiekie / One Tree Hill
- Maungawhau / Mount Eden
- Maungarei / Mount Wellington
- Mount Tongariro

== South America ==
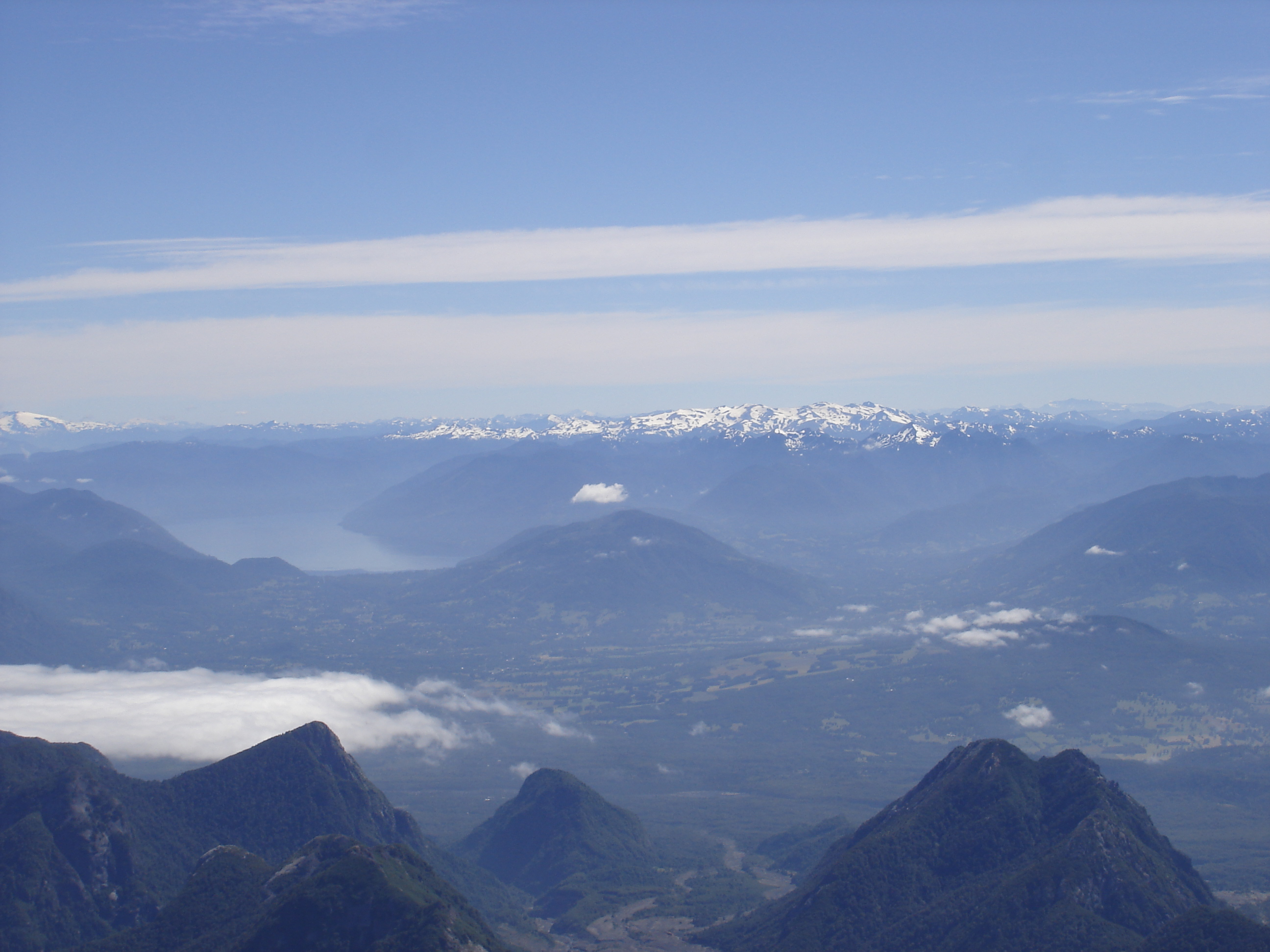
Caburgua-Huelemolle.

=== Peru ===
- Central Volcanic Zone
  - Andagua volcanic field
  - Cerro Nicholson

=== Chile ===
- Central Volcanic Zone
  - El Rojo Norte
  - El Rojo Sur
- Austral Volcanic Zone:
  - Pali-Aike Volcanic Field
- Southern Volcanic Zone:
  - Anticura Group
  - Fui Group
  - Caburgua-Huelemolle
  - Puyuhuapi
  - Pichi-Golgol Group
  - Carrán-Los Venados, Chile
    - Mirador
    - Los Venados Group
- Easter Island
  - Puna Pau

== Other ==
- Royal Society Volcano, Antarctica
- Cerro Volcánico, Argentina
- Bombalai Hill (Sabah, Malaysia)
- Geghama mountains, Armenia
- Chaîne des Puys, France (a chain of volcanoes including cinder cones)
- Manda-Inakir, Ethiopia-Djibouti border
- Barren Island, Andaman Islands
- Teneguía, Canary Islands
- Cerro Negro, Nicaragua

== See also ==
- List of lava domes
- List of shield volcanoes
- List of stratovolcanoes
- List of subglacial volcanoes
- Lists of volcanoes
