= Wells Gray-Clearwater volcanic field =

Volcanic field in British Columbia, Canada

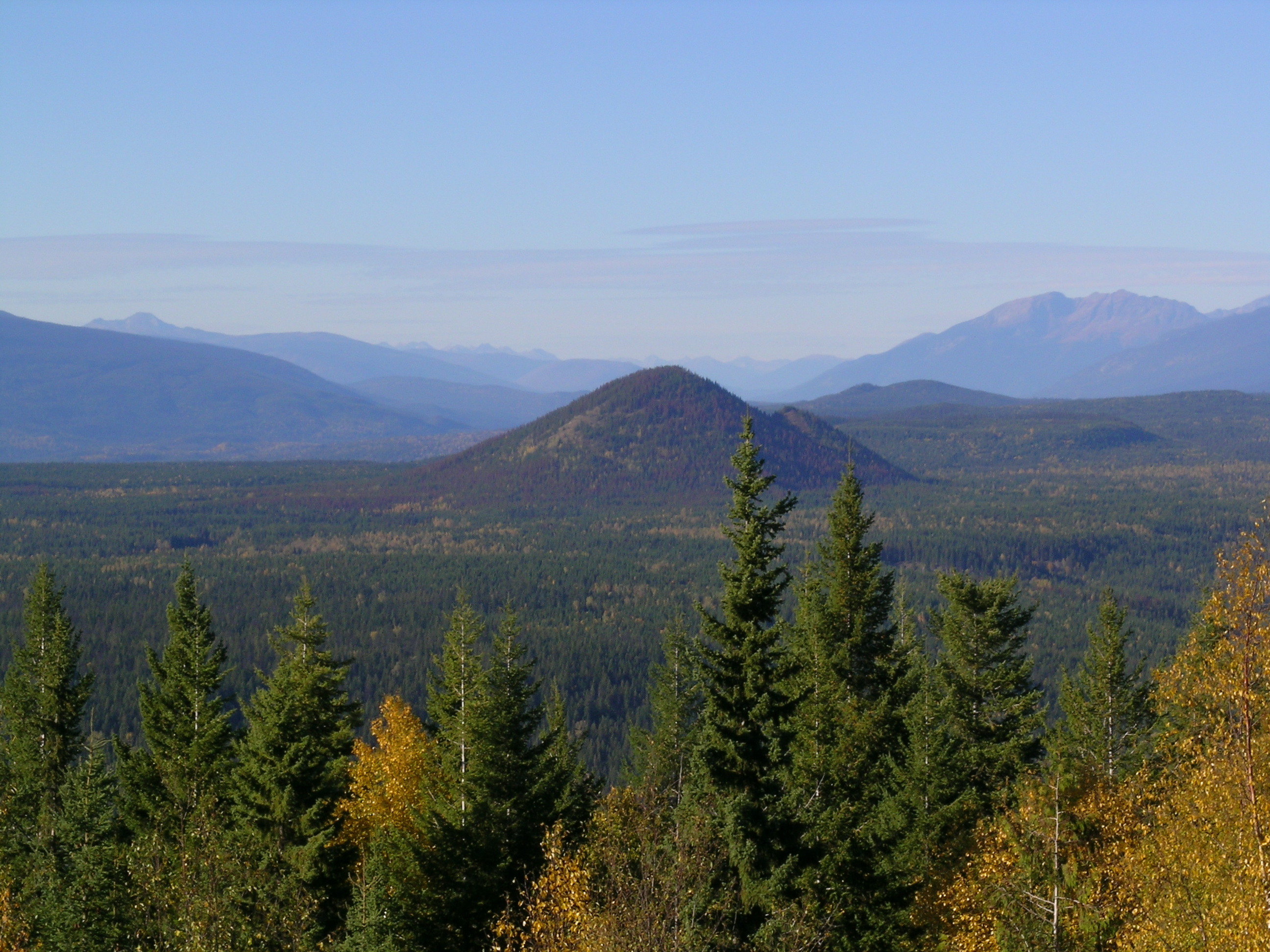
- A view from Green Mountain with Pyramid Mountain in the distance

Highest point
- Elevation: 2,100 m (6,900 ft)
- Coordinates: 52.33°N 120.57°W

Geography
- Location: British Columbia, Canada
- Parent range: Quesnel Highland/Shuswap Highland/Cariboo Mountains

Geology
- Rock age: Pliocene-to-Holocene
- Mountain type: Monogenetic volcanic field
- Last eruption: 1550 (?)

The Wells Gray-Clearwater volcanic field, also called the Clearwater Cone Group, is a potentially active monogenetic volcanic field in east-central British Columbia, Canada, located approximately 130 km (81 mi) north of Kamloops. It is situated in the Cariboo Mountains of the Columbia Mountains and on the Quesnel and Shuswap Highlands. As a monogenetic volcanic field, it is a place with numerous small basaltic volcanoes and extensive lava flows.

Most of the Wells Gray-Clearwater volcanic field is encompassed within a large wilderness park called Wells Gray Provincial Park. This 5,405 km^{2} (2,087 sq mi) park was established in 1939 to protect Helmcken Falls and the unique features of the Clearwater River drainage basin, including this volcanic field. Five roads enter the park and provide views of some of the field's volcanic features. Short hikes lead to several other volcanic features, but some areas are accessible only by aircraft.

== Geology ==
=== Pleistocene epoch ===
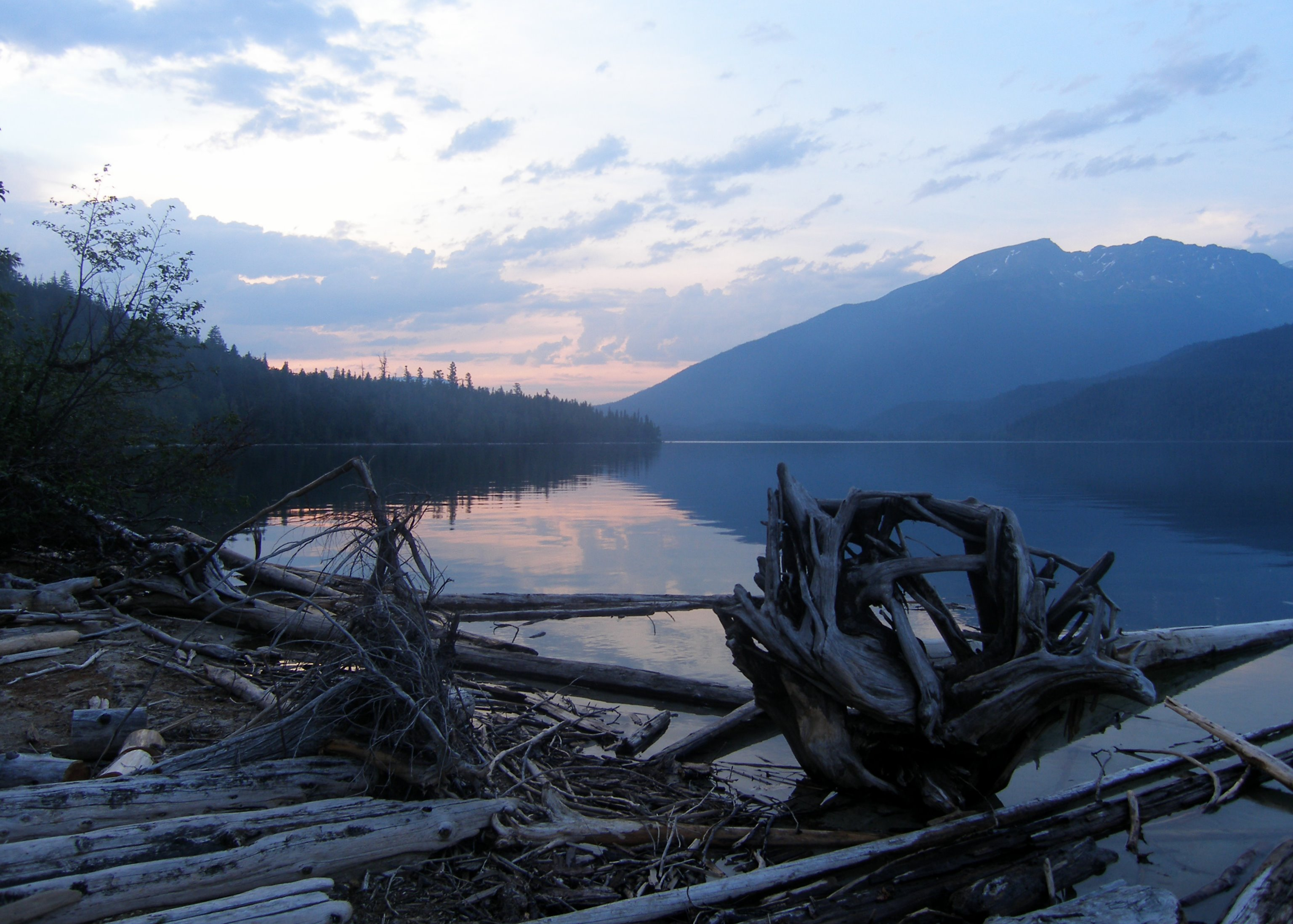
Clearwater Lake, a lava dammed lake in the Wells Gray-Clearwater volcanic field

Based on radiocarbon and potassium-argon dating, volcanic activity in the Wells Gray-Clearwater volcanic field began in the early Pleistocene epoch, creating valley-filling and plateau-capping lava flows that have a total volume of approximately 25 km^{3} (6 cu mi). The emplacement of these lava flows spanned at least three periods of glaciation, evidence for which is preserved in the form of tuyas, ice-ponded valley deposits, and subglacial mounds. The few tuyas in the region, such as Gage Hill, Hyalo Ridge, McLeod Hill and Mosquito Mound, were formed when magma intruded into and melted a vertical pipe in the overlying glacial ice. The partially molten mass cooled as a large block, with gravity flattening its upper surface. The glacial erosion of the tuyas suggests they erupted during the early Pleistocene epoch.

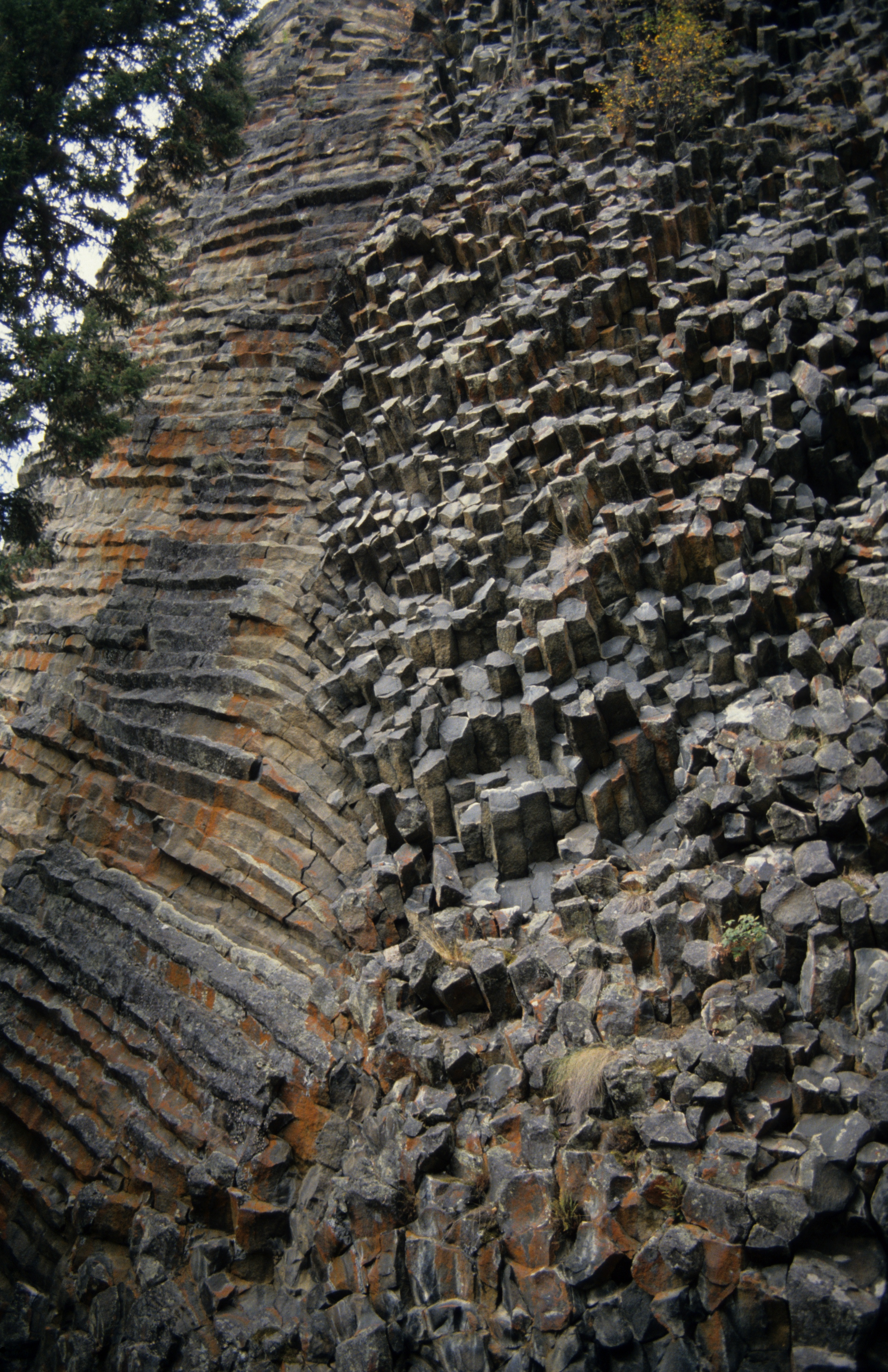
Rock Roses formation on south side of White Horse Bluff

At least one explosive subaqueous volcano formed during the Pleistocene epoch. This subaqueous volcano, known as White Horse Bluff, is thought to have formed in three phases. Its first phase of activity was involved with water, possibly dammed by glacial ice which filled the Clearwater River valley. The volcano heated glacial water then flooded down the volcano's vent, creating violent steam explosions and broken lava fragments. Once the steam explosions had subsided, the broken lava fragments settled back into the glacial water, creating the unvolcano-like form of White Horse Bluff which is mostly made of fragmental volcanic glass called hyaloclastite. The volcano ceased erupting soon after breaching the surface of the glacial water.

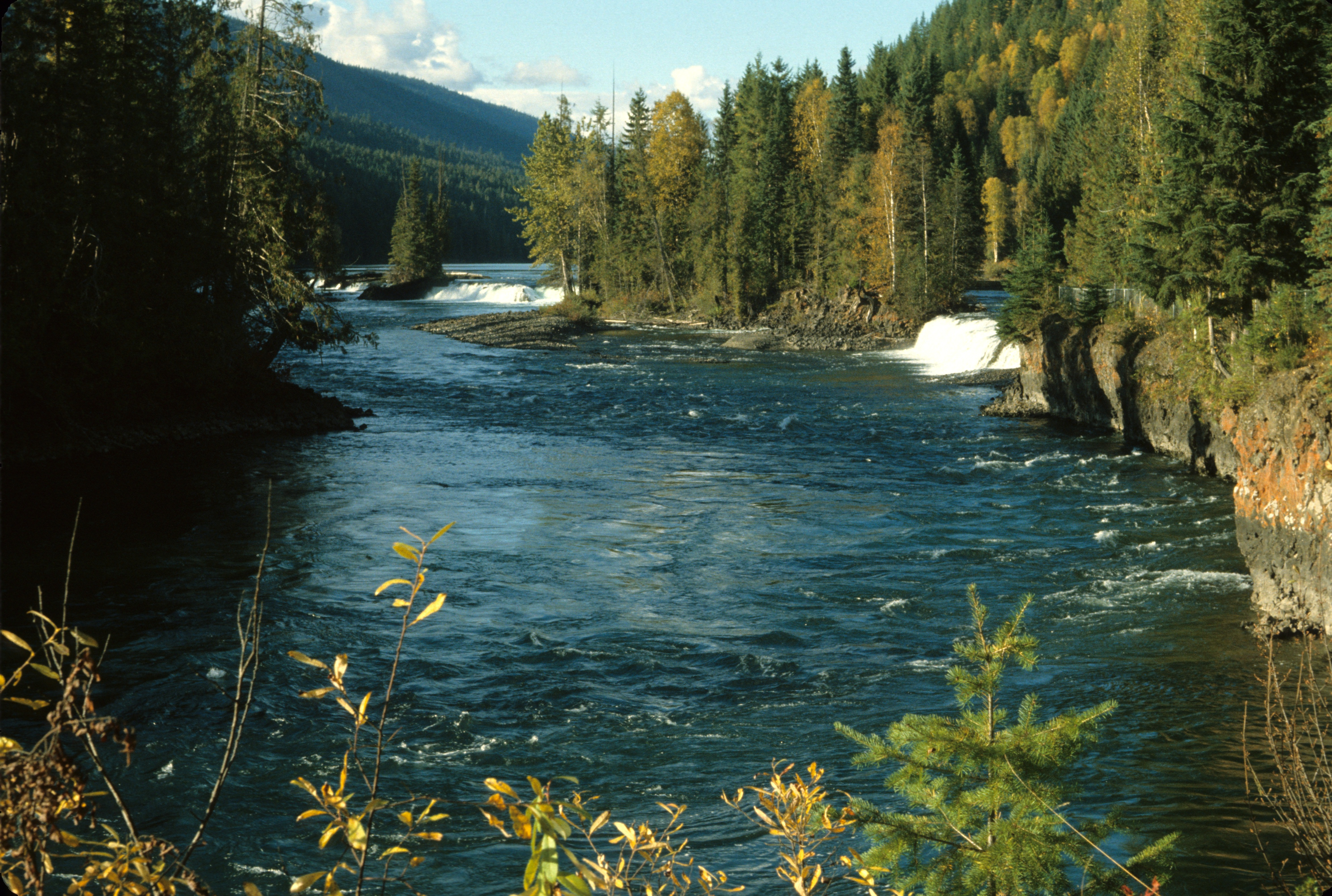
Osprey Falls drops over the lava dam at outlet of Clearwater Lake

Other volcanic events elsewhere interacted with groundwater and magma creating numerous pit craters. Many of these pit craters have been filled with water creating several crater lakes. In some places glacial till and fluvial sands and gravels are maintained under the several lava flows that form the volcanic field. Paleosols are found, but are rare. Glaciation has left a thick blanket of till over nearly all of the volcanic deposits and therefore outcrop is largely limited to cliffforming exposures in several valleys.

=== Holocene epoch ===
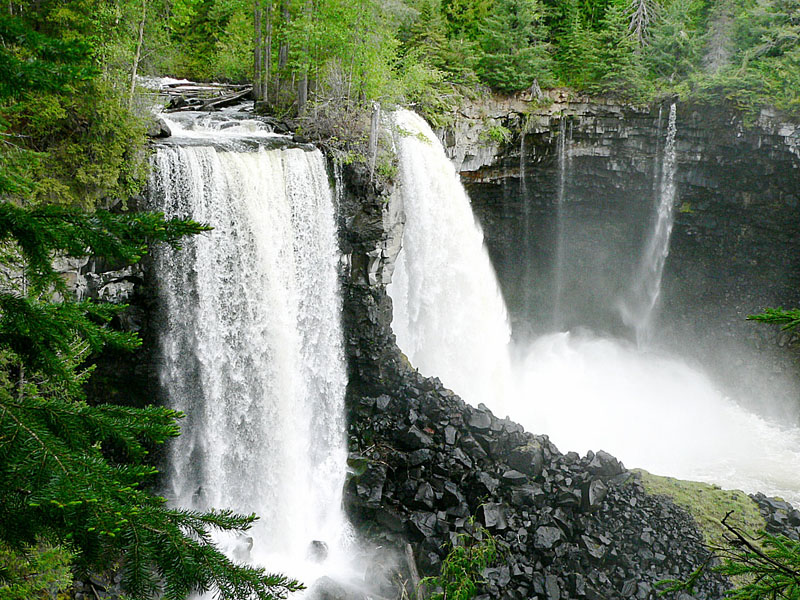
Canim Falls and lava flows

At the end of the last ice age approximately 10,000 years ago, massive floods from the melting glacial ice carved deep canyons into the underlying plateau-capping lava flows. Most of these canyons contain rivers such as the Murtle and Clearwater, and waterfalls such as Canim Falls, Moul Falls, Spahats Falls and the 141 m (463 ft) high Helmcken Falls. The faces of the basaltic lava flows and waterfalls remain vertical due to the nature of the basaltic lava flows. Basaltic lava shrinks as it cools and forms vertical columns of rock called columnar basalt. More recently, the southern end of the volcanic field has experienced continuous volcanic activity since the end of the last ice age. This volcanic activity occurred in three areas; Spanish Creek, Ray Lake and Kostal Lake which were followed by lava fountain eruptions creating cinder cones and lava flows.

Volcanism in the Spanish Creek and Ray Lake areas were synglacial but continued after the glacial ice had melted away. Two cinder cones, known as Flourmill Cone and Pointed Stick Cone, were created in the Spanish Creek and Ray Lake areas. Lava flows from the two cinder cones lie on glaciated bedrock without an intervening paleosol, indicating an early Holocene age.

Eruptions near Ray Lake built a cinder cone known as Dragon Cone and concluded with an approximately 16 km (9.9 mi) long ʻaʻā lava flow that has been radiocarbon dated at about 7,600 years old. This lava flow, known as "Dragon's Tongue", is at least 15 m (49 ft) thick at the proximal end, but thins to 3 m (9.8 ft) at the distal end, damming the southern end of Clearwater Lake. Tree molds are maintained within the lava flow at the lower end.

The latest volcanic eruption created a small tree-covered basaltic cinder cone at the east end of Kostal Lake called Kostal Cone perhaps as recently as 400 years ago, making it one of the youngest volcanoes in Canada based on tree-growth data.

=== Origins ===
Map of the Wells Gray-Clearwater volcanic field

The Wells Gray-Clearwater volcanic field began forming approximately 3,500,000 years ago and has grown steadily since then. The tectonic causes of the volcanism that have produced the Wells Gray-Clearwater volcanic field are not yet clear and are therefore a matter of ongoing research. It is approximately 250 km (160 mi) inland from the north–south trending Garibaldi Volcanic Belt and is along-strike from the Nootka Fault on the British Columbia Coast, which has been subducting under the North American plate at the Cascadia subduction zone. The Wells Gray volcanics are mostly alkali olivine basalt, with some lava flows comprising mantle xenoliths. Basalts of the Wells Gray-Clearwater volcanic field have been considered to be the easternmost expression of the Anahim Volcanic Belt. However, its relationship is unknown because the age-location trend does not reach into the Wells Gray-Clearwater area, and the Wells Gray-Clearwater volcanic field is not along trend with the Anahim Volcanic Belt. The Wells Gray volcanics were thought to have formed by crustal thinning and the existence of crustal penetrating structures.

More recent studies by volcanologists associated with the Geological Survey of Canada have indicated that the subducted extension of the Nookta Fault may be the primary cause of the alkalic structure of the Wells Gray-Clearwater volcanic field. The volcanism might have been mostly generated by asthenospheric upwelling possibly by displacement along the transform fault. If the transform fault had a section of vertical tearing to contain potentially different dip angles between the Explorer and Juan de Fuca plates, the subducted plate asthenosphere may possibly flow upward into the mantle wedge. Similarly, if the displacement had a section of extension, a horizontal slab window-like gap would have developed, again allowing a pathway for upwelling magma. In either case, the unsettled asthenosphere might have experienced low degrees of decompressional melting and interacted with North American lithosphere to yield within plate compositions.

=== Lava composition ===
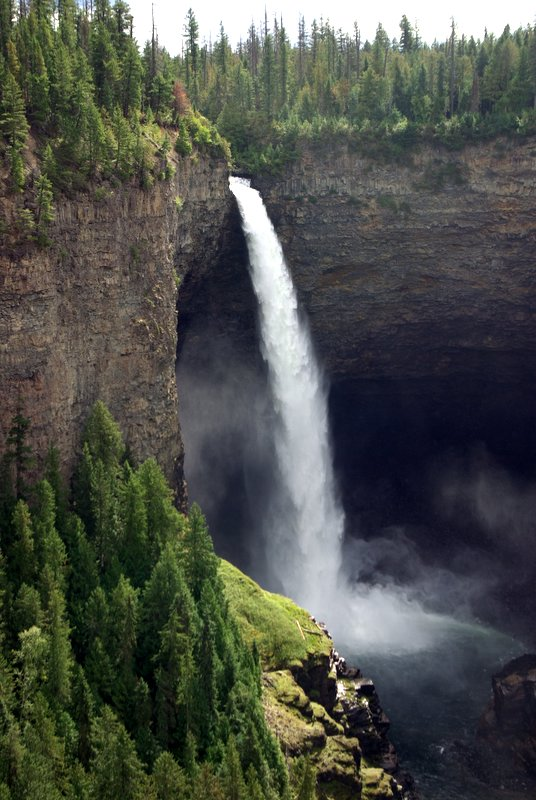
Helmcken Falls and the deposits of volcanic rock

The composition of some lava flows in the Wells Gray-Clearwater volcanic field is unusual because they include small, angular to rounded fragments of rock called nodules and crystals that come from the mantle. These green nodules are known as peridotites because they are mostly made of a magnesium iron silicate mineral called olivine. These lava flows also comprise large crystals of olivine, plagioclase, and pyroxene that crystallized deep within the Earth's crust and mantle. The lavas and nodules they contain are similar to those erupted at Volcano Mountain in the Yukon. The nodules help volcanologists and other geoscientists to verify what the mantle beneath the volcanic field is like.

Holocene lava flows are more alkalic than the Pleistocene lava flows and comprise several xenoliths of chromium-spinel lherzolite, spinel clinopyroxenite, and rare ferroan websterite and spinel wehrlite. Xenoliths do not exist in the older lava flows. However, chemical evidence indicates that every lava flow was produced in a similar way by low degrees of piecemeal melting. The melts originally came from the upper mantle which, over time, was progressively depleted by every following melting event.

=== Current activity ===
The Wells Gray-Clearwater volcanic field is one of the 10 volcanic areas in Canada associated with recent seismic activity; the others are Castle Rock, Mount Edziza, Mount Cayley, Hoodoo Mountain, The Volcano, Crow Lagoon, Mount Meager massif, Mount Garibaldi and Nazko Cone. Seismic data suggests that these volcanoes still contain living magma plumbing systems, indicating possible future eruptive activity. Although the available data does not allow a clear conclusion, these observations are further indications that some of Canada's volcanoes are potentially active, and that their associated hazards may be significant. Beneath areas of monogenetic cinder cone activity, such as the Wells Gray-Clearwater volcanic field, the seismicity appears to be more dispersed. In a few cases earthquakes are clustered in time and space, suggestive of volcanic earthquake swarms.

== Volcanic hazards ==
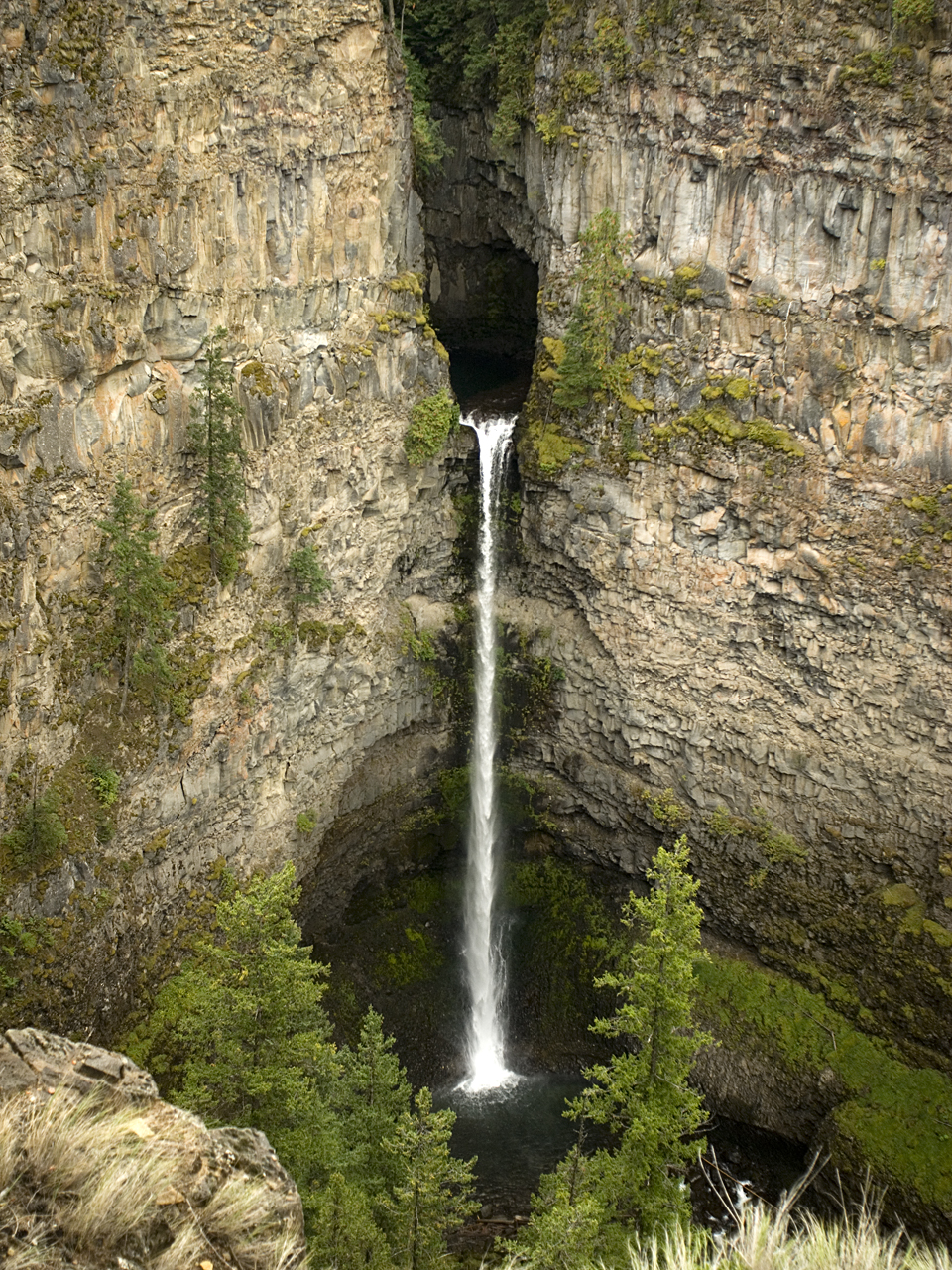
Spahats Falls and deposits of volcanic rock

=== Lava eruptions ===
Because the Wells Gray-Clearwater volcanic field is in a remote location, danger from lava eruptions would be low to moderate. Magma with low levels of silica (as in basalt) commonly extend tens of kilometers from the volcano's vent. The leading edges of basalt flows can travel as fast as 10 kilometres per hour (6.2 mph) on steep slopes but they typically advance less than 1 kilometre per hour (0.62 mph) on gentle slopes. But when basalt lava flows are confined within a channel or lava tube on a steep slope, the main body of the flow can reach velocities more than 30 kilometres per hour (19 mph). Based on past volcanic activity, the Wells Gray-Clearwater volcanic field has a long history of producing quiet lava fountaining-style eruptions. Such eruptions consist of ejection of incandescent cinder, lapilli and lava bombs to altitudes of tens to hundreds of metres. They are small to medium in volume, with sporadic violence. Since the region is mostly forested and lava flows are likely to travel long distances, it is possible lava eruptions could start large forest fires and some river valleys might be dammed.

=== Explosive eruptions ===
More violent eruptions are possible only in unique circumstances, such as an eruption into a lake. Any future eruption is most likely to affect only a limited area downslope from the volcano. Poisonous substances, such as volcanic gas, includes a variety of substances. These include gases trapped in cavities (vesicles) in volcanic rocks, dissolved or dislocated gases in magma and lava, or gases emanating directly from lava or indirectly through ground water heated by volcanic action. The volcanic gases that pose the greatest potential hazard to people, animals, agriculture, and property are sulfur dioxide, carbon dioxide and hydrogen fluoride. Locally, sulfur dioxide gas can lead to acid rain and air pollution downwind from the volcano.

== Monitoring ==
Currently the Wells Gray-Clearwater volcanic field is not monitored closely enough by the Geological Survey of Canada to ascertain how active the volcanic field's magma system is. The existing network of seismographs has been established to monitor tectonic earthquakes and is too far away to provide a good indication of what is happening beneath the volcanic field. It may sense an increase in activity if the volcanic field becomes very restless, but this may only provide a warning for a large eruption. It might detect activity only after the volcanic field has started erupting.

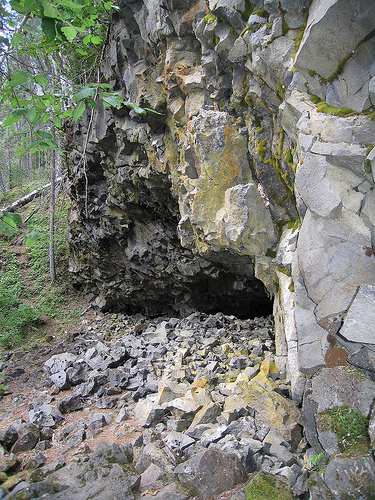
Columnar basalt of the Dragon's Tongue lava flow

A possible way to detect an eruption is studying the volcanic field's geological history since every volcano has its own pattern of behaviour, in terms of its eruption style, magnitude and frequency, so that its future eruption is expected to be similar to its previous eruptions. But this would likely be abandoned in part because of the volcanic field's remoteness.

While there is a likelihood of Canada being critically affected by local or close by volcanic eruptions argues that some kind of improvement program is required. Benefit-cost thoughts are critical to dealing with natural hazards. However, a benefit-cost examination needs correct data about the hazard types, magnitudes and occurrences. These do not exist for volcanoes in British Columbia or elsewhere in Canada in the detail required.

Other volcanic techniques, such as hazard mapping, displays a volcano's eruptive history in detail and speculates an understanding of the hazardous activity that could possibly be expected in the future. At present no hazard maps have been created for the Wells Gray-Clearwater volcanic field because the level of knowledge is insufficient due to its remoteness. A large volcanic hazard program has never existed within the Geological Survey of Canada. The majority of information has been collected in a lengthy, separate way from the support of several employees, such as volcanologists and other geologic scientists. Current knowledge is best established at the Mount Meager massif and is likely to rise considerably with a temporary mapping and monitoring project. Knowledge at the Wells Gray-Clearwater volcanic field and other volcanic areas in British Columbia is not as established, but certain contributions are being done at least Mount Cayley. An intensive program classifying infrastructural exposure near all young Canadian volcanoes and quick hazard assessments at each individual volcanic edifice associated with recent seismic activity would be in advance and would produce a quick and productive determination of priority areas for further efforts.

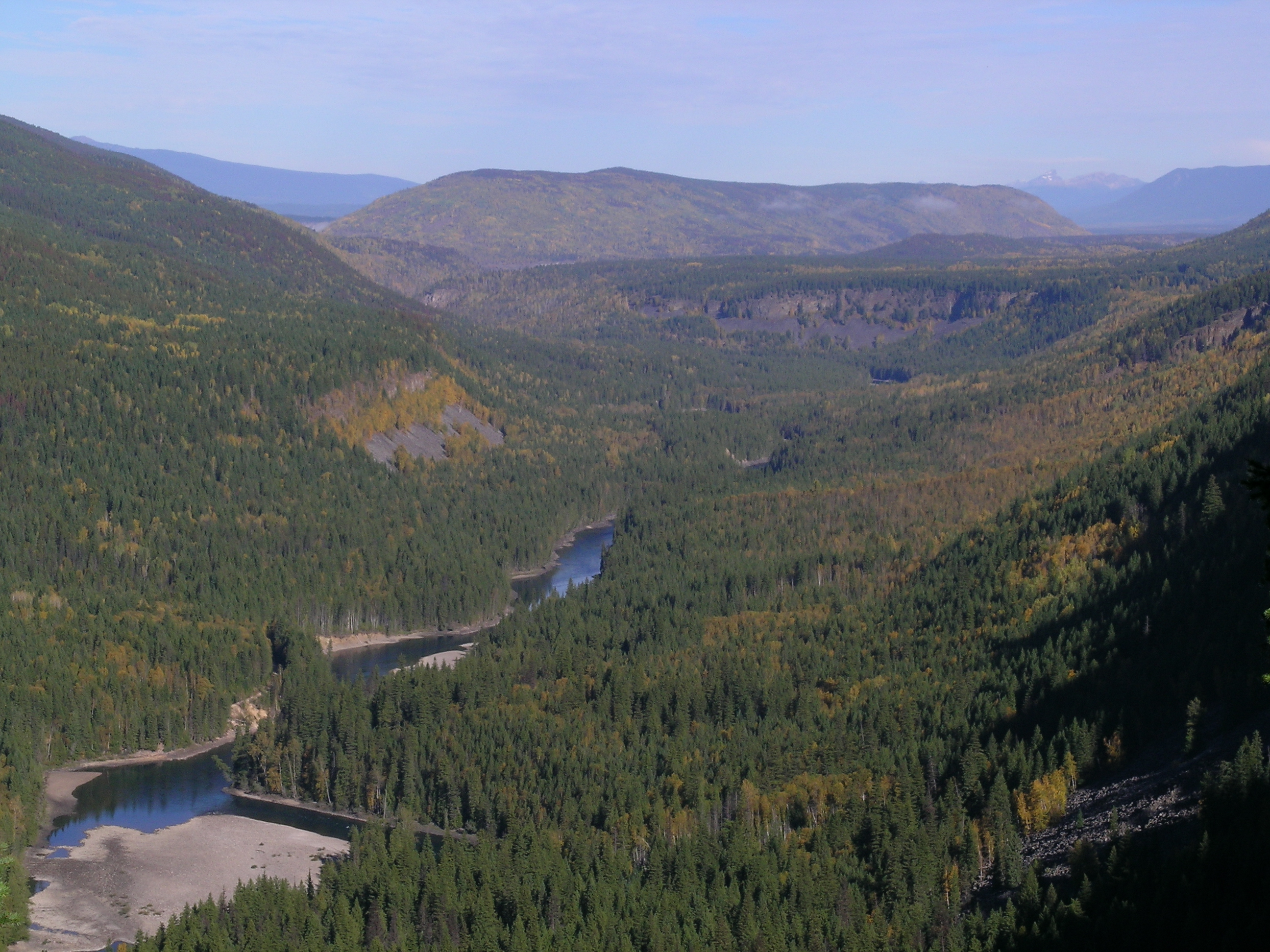
Clearwater Valley

The existing network of seismographs to monitor tectonic earthquakes has existed since 1975, although it remained small in population until 1985. Apart from a few short-term seismic monitoring experiments by the Geological Survey of Canada, no volcano monitoring has been accomplished at the Wells Gray-Clearwater volcanic field or at other volcanoes in Canada at a level approaching that in other established countries with historically active volcanoes. Active or restless volcanoes are usually monitored using at least three seismographs all within approximately 15 kilometres (9.3 mi), and frequently within 5 kilometres (3.1 mi), for better sensitivity of detection and reduced location errors, particularly for earthquake depth. Such monitoring detects the risk of an eruption, offering a forecasting capability which is important to mitigating volcanic risk. Currently the Wells Gray-Clearwater volcanic field does not have a seismograph closer than 59 kilometres (37 mi). With increasing distance and declining numbers of seismographs used to indicate seismic activity, the prediction capability is reduced because earthquake location accuracy and depth decreases, and the network becomes not as accurate. However, at least one possible volcanic earthquake swarm has been noticed east of the Wells Gray-Clearwater volcanic field. The inaccurate earthquake locations in the Wells Gray-Clearwater volcanic field are a few kilometers, and in more isolated northern regions they are up to 10 kilometres (6.2 mi). The location magnitude level in the Wells Gray-Clearwater volcanic field is about magnitude 1 to 1.5, and elsewhere it is magnitude 1.5 to 2. At carefully monitored volcanoes both the located and noticed events are recorded and surveyed immediately to improve the understanding of a future eruption. Undetected events are not recorded or surveyed in British Columbia immediately, nor in an easy-to-access process.

In countries like Canada it is possible that small precursor earthquake swarms might go undetected, particularly if no events were observed; more significant events in larger swarms would be detected but only a minor subdivision of the swarm events would be complex to clarify them with confidence as volcanic in nature, or even associate them with an individual volcanic edifice.

== Notable vents ==
Name	Height		Coordinates	Type	Age of last eruption
Name	metres	feet	Coordinates	Type	Age of last eruption
Quesnel Lake	1,292	4,239	52.65°N 120.98°W	Cinder cone	Pleistocene
Kostal Cone	1,440	4,720	52.17°N 119.94°W	Cinder cone	Holocene
Pillow Creek	1,829	6,001	52.02°N 119.84°W	Subglacial volcano	Pleistocene
Gage Hill	1,090	3,580	52.05°N 120.01°W	Tuya	Pleistocene
Dragon Cone	1,850	6,070	52.25°N 120.02°W	Cinder cone	Holocene
Flourmill Cone	1,495	4,905	52.05°N 120.32°W	Cinder cone	Holocene
Pointed Stick Cone	1,820	5,970	52.24°N 120.08°W	Cinder cone	Holocene
Spanish Lake Centre	1,770	5,810	52.07°N 120.31°W	Cinder cone	Holocene
Spanish Bonk	1,770	5,810	52.13°N 120.37°W	Volcanic neck	Pleistocene
Ray Mountain	2,050	6,730	52.24°N 120.11°W	Subglacial mound	Pleistocene
Spanish Mump	1,800	5,900	52.16°N 120.33°W	Subglacial mound	Pleistocene
Jack's Jump	1,895	6,217	52.12°N 120.05°W	Subglacial volcano	Pleistocene
Hyalo Ridge	2,012	6,601	52.11°N 120.36°W	Tuya	Pleistocene
McLeod Hill	1,250	4,100	52.02°N 120.01°W	Tuya	Pleistocene
Mosquito Mound	1,065	3,494	52.02°N 120.18°W	Tuya	Pleistocene
Buck Hill	1,585	5,200	51.08°N 119.98°W	Cinder cone	Pleistocene
Ida Ridge	1,981	6,499	51.08°N 119.94°W	Cinder cone	Pleistocene
Fiftytwo Ridge	1,996	6,549	51.93°N 119.89°W	Subglacial volcano	Pleistocene
Flatiron	730	2,400	51.88°N 120.05°W	Volcanic outcrop	Pleistocene
White Horse Bluff	831	2,726	51.09°N 120.11°W	Subaqueous volcano	Pleistocene
Pyramid Mountain	1,095	3,593	51.99°N 120.01°W	Subglacial volcano	Pleistocene

== See also ==
- Anahim Volcanic Belt
- Chilcotin Group
- Garibaldi Volcanic Belt
- Geology of the Pacific Northwest
- List of volcanoes in Canada
- List of volcanic fields
- Maar
- Northern Cordilleran Volcanic Province
- Volcanology of Canada
- Volcanology of Western Canada
