= Dragon Cone =

Cinder cone in Wells Gray Provincial Park, BC, Canada

- Location within British Columbia
- Location in Wells Gray Provincial Park

Highest point
- Elevation: 1,830 m (6,000 ft)
- Coordinates: 52.25°N 120.05°W

Geography
- Location: British Columbia, Canada
- Parent range: Cariboo Mountains

Geology
- Rock age: Holocene
- Mountain type: Cinder cone
- Volcanic field: Wells Gray-Clearwater volcanic field
- Last eruption: 7560 BP

Dragon Cone is a monogenetic cinder cone located in Wells Gray Provincial Park in east-central British Columbia. It is the source of a 15 km (9 mi) long lava flow, called Dragon's Tongue. This lava covered the floor of narrow Falls Creek Valley and terminated at the Clearwater River, damming it to a height of 3 m (10 ft) and raising the level of existing Clearwater Lake upstream. Geologists have recovered some peat buried by the lava and radiocarbon dating produced an age of 7560 years plus or minus 100 years. Flows from nearby Flourmill Cone, Kostal Cone and Spanish Lake Cones rest on glaciated bedrock without an intervening paleosol, suggesting an early Holocene age.

Visits to Dragon Cone are very rare due to difficult access. The nearest trail is the overgrown Kostal Lake Trail, over 5 km (3.1 mi) to the south. Falls Creek is impassable for boats. The cone is best viewed from the air, but float plane landings on nearby Ray Lake are not permitted.

== See also ==
- List of volcanoes in Canada
- Volcanism of Canada
- Volcanism of Western Canada
