= Spanish Bonk =

Mountain in Canada

- Location within British Columbia
- Interactive map of Spanish Bonk

Highest point
- Elevation: 1,770 m (5,810 ft)
- Coordinates: 52°13′N 120°37′W

Geography
- Location: British Columbia, Canada
- Parent range: Quesnel Highland

Geology
- Rock age: Pleistocene
- Mountain type: Volcanic plug
- Volcanic field: Wells Gray-Clearwater volcanic field
- Last eruption: Pleistocene

Spanish Bonk is a volcanic plug located in the Quesnel Highland of the Wells Gray-Clearwater volcanic field in southeastern British Columbia, Canada. Spanish Bonk last erupted during the Pleistocene.

== See also ==
- List of volcanoes in Canada
