= Mount Ray (British Columbia) =

Mountain in British Columbia, Canada

- Aerial view of Mount Ray

Highest point
- Elevation: 2,046 m (6,713 ft)
- Coordinates: 52°15′N 120°06′W

Geography
- Location within British Columbia
- Interactive map of Mount Ray
- Location: British Columbia, Canada
- District: Kamloops Division Yale Land District
- Parent range: Cariboo Mountains
- Topo map: NTS 93A8 Azure Lake

Geology
- Rock age: Pleistocene
- Mountain type: Subglacial mound
- Volcanic field: Wells Gray-Clearwater volcanic field
- Last eruption: 20,000 years

Mount Ray, also known as Ray Mountain, is a subglacial mound in Wells Gray Provincial Park, British Columbia, Canada. Mount Ray last erupted during the Pleistocene. It is part of the Wells Gray-Clearwater volcanic field.

The lava flows were restricted by larger masses of ice in the valleys on either side of Mount Ray, so the lava did not extend any great distance from its origin.

Mount Ray was named for John Bunyan Ray, the first settler in the Clearwater Valley. He was born in 1878 in North Carolina and came to the Valley in 1909. He cleared land and established a farm in the wilderness south of Clearwater Lake. He married Alice Ludtke in 1932 and they raised three children, Nancy, Doug and Bob. The Ray family decided to move to the North Thompson Valley in 1946, mainly so the children could receive a school education instead of by correspondence. In December 1947, John Ray trekked into his old homestead and died there from a heart attack. Ray Lake, east of Mount Ray, and Ray Mineral Spring are also named for John Ray.

Mount Ray is best viewed from a plane and its bright red colour contrasts with the forest below. The west slopes can be seen from boats on Clearwater Lake. No trails go anywhere near the mountain. The Kostal Lake trail used to pass 8 km (5.0 mi) to the south, but this trail was permanently closed by BC Parks in 2013.

== See also ==
- Wells Gray-Clearwater volcanic field
- List of volcanoes in Canada
- Volcanism of Canada
- Volcanism of Western Canada
- Fissure vent
