= Buck Hill (British Columbia) =

- Location within British Columbia
- Interactive map of Buck Hill

Highest point
- Elevation: 1,585 m (5,200 ft)
- Listing: Volcanoes of Canada
- Coordinates: 51°47′56″N 119°58′52″W

Geography
- Country: Canada
- Province: British Columbia
- District: Kamloops Division Yale Land District
- Parent range: Shuswap Highland
- Topo map: NTS 82M/13

Geology
- Rock age: Pleistocene
- Mountain type: Cinder cone
- Volcanic field: Wells Gray-Clearwater volcanic field
- Last eruption: 10,000 years ago

Buck Hill is a hill in east-central British Columbia, Canada, located 17 km (10.6 mi) north of Clearwater. It rises from the west slope of Trophy Mountain. Buck Hill is just outside the boundary of Wells Gray Provincial Park.

== Geology ==
Buck Hill is a cinder cone in the Wells Gray-Clearwater volcanic field. It last erupted about 10,000 years ago during the last glaciation of the Clearwater Valley. A slurry of lava debris and water flowed away from the cone and hardened in Second and Third Canyons further down Trophy Mountain. After the eruption stopped, a glacier smoothed the sides of Buck Hill. Several craters can be found on the west side.

== Access ==
Buck Hill is one of the most accessible volcanoes in the Wells Gray Park area because one can drive to its base. Access is via Trophy Mountain Road off Clearwater Valley Road (also called Wells Gray Park Road), then some old logging and mining roads to some pits where recent mining for decorative lava rock has occurred. It is not safe to climb Buck Hill as the pine bark beetle attack of 2005-2007 has left hundreds of dead trees that can fall even in a gentle wind.

== History ==
Buck Hill was named in the 1960s by Clearwater sheep rancher and guide, Ida DeKelver, for the numerous deer in the region. Emil and Ida DeKelver arrived in the Clearwater Valley in 1959 and settled on an 80-acre farm beside Candle Creek. At first, the DeKelvers raised dairy cattle. In 1962, they purchased a Trophy Mountain grazing lease and 100 ewes and rams from the Ronacher brothers. They soon expanded the herd to 300 and were very successful with the lush Trophy meadows. Their trail to the alpine followed Third Canyon Creek and passed just south of Buck Hill. Each spring and fall, it took three days to move their herd between the farm and the meadows. In 1969, mounting government pressure against grazing lease-holders persuaded the DeKelvers to switch to guiding and trail-riding on Trophy Mountain. They built a new trail up Spahats Creek which was much shorter than the Third Canyon route, although strenuous compared to today's stroll to the meadows. When logging started on Trophy Mountain in 1979 and roads were built almost to treeline, the DeKelvers' business was ruined and they retired to their Candle Creek farm. Ida DeKelver became the unofficial historian of the Clearwater Valley and created the Yellowhead Museum (now closed). She died at age 93 in 2017. Ida Falls near Buck Hill has been named in her memory and DeKelver Summit on Trophy Mountain commemorates Ida and Emil.

== See also ==
- Volcanism of Canada
- Volcanism of Western Canada
