= Hyalo Ridge =

Mountain in Canada

Highest point
- Elevation: 2,012 m (6,601 ft)
- Coordinates: 52°11′N 120°36′W

Geography
- Location: British Columbia, Canada

Geology
- Mountain type: Tuya
- Volcanic field: Wells Gray-Clearwater volcanic field
- Last eruption: Pleistocene

Hyalo Ridge is a tuya in Wells Gray Provincial Park.

== See also ==
- List of volcanoes in Canada
- Volcanism of Canada
- Volcanism of Western Canada
