= Kostal Cone =

Cinder cone in Wells Gray Provincial Park, British Columbia, Canada

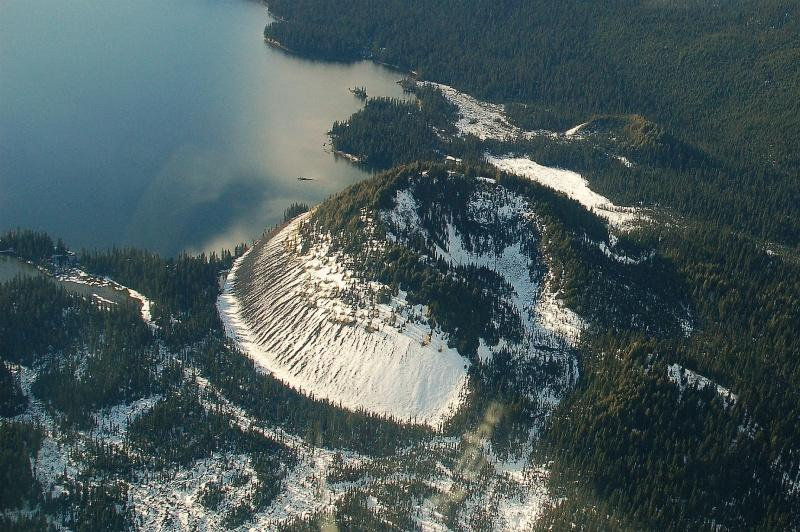
- Kostal Cone

Highest point
- Elevation: 1,440 m (4,720 ft)
- Prominence: 190 m (620 ft)
- Coordinates: CA-BC 52°10′N 119°57′W

Geography
- Location within British Columbia
- Interactive map of Kostal Cone
- Location: British Columbia, Canada
- District: Kamloops Division Yale Land District
- Parent range: Cariboo Mountains
- Topo map: NTS 83D4 Murtle Lake

Geology
- Rock age: Holocene
- Mountain type: Cinder cone
- Volcanic field: Wells Gray-Clearwater volcanic field
- Last eruption: 1550 (?)

Kostal Cone, also called Kostal Volcano and Fire Mountain, is a young cinder cone in Wells Gray Provincial Park in east-central British Columbia, Canada. It rises from the northeast shore of Kostal Lake in the Cariboo Mountains. With an elevation of 1,440 m (4,724 ft), Kostal Cone is one of the lowest volcanoes in the Wells Gray-Clearwater volcanic field.

There has been activity at this site as recently as 7,600 years ago, though more likely less than 1,000 years ago. Kostal Cone is too young for the commonly used potassium-argon dating technique (usable on specimens over 100,000 years old), and no charred organic material for radiocarbon dating has been found. However, the uneroded structure of the cone with the existence of trees on its flanks and summit have it an area for dendrochronology studies, which reveals the growth of tree-ring patterns. Tree-growth data has revealed an age of 400 years for Kostal Cone, making it the youngest volcano in the Wells Gray-Clearwater volcanic field and one of the youngest volcanoes in Canada.

Kostal Cone is made of fragmented and solidified lava called cinder and its summit contains a bowl-shaped crater. Kostal's cinders were ejected by lava fountain eruptions and accumulated around the volcano's vent in the shape of a cone when they fell back around its surroundings. Lava flows from Kostal's 400 BP eruption are basaltic in composition and forms a lava bed. It is an example of volcanic activity that has occurred in the Wells Gray-Clearwater volcanic field since the last glacial period; others include the Dragon's Tongue lava flow from Dragon Cone just north of Kostal Cone and the Flourmill Volcanoes north of Mahood Lake.

== See also ==
- Volcanism of Western Canada
- List of volcanoes in Canada
