= Mosquito Mound =

Flat-topped, steep-sided volcano in British Columbia, Canada

- Location within British Columbia
- Interactive map of Mosquito Mound

Highest point
- Elevation: 1,065 m (3,494 ft)
- Coordinates: 52.02°N 120.18°W

Geography
- Location: British Columbia, Canada

Geology
- Rock age: Pleistocene
- Mountain type: Tuya
- Volcanic field: Wells Gray-Clearwater volcanic field
- Last eruption: Pleistocene

Mosquito Mound is a tuya in east-central British Columbia, Canada, located in Wells Gray Provincial Park.

== See also ==
- List of volcanoes in Canada
- Volcanism of Canada
- Volcanism of Western Canada
