= Trophy Mountain =

Mountain in British Columbia, Canada

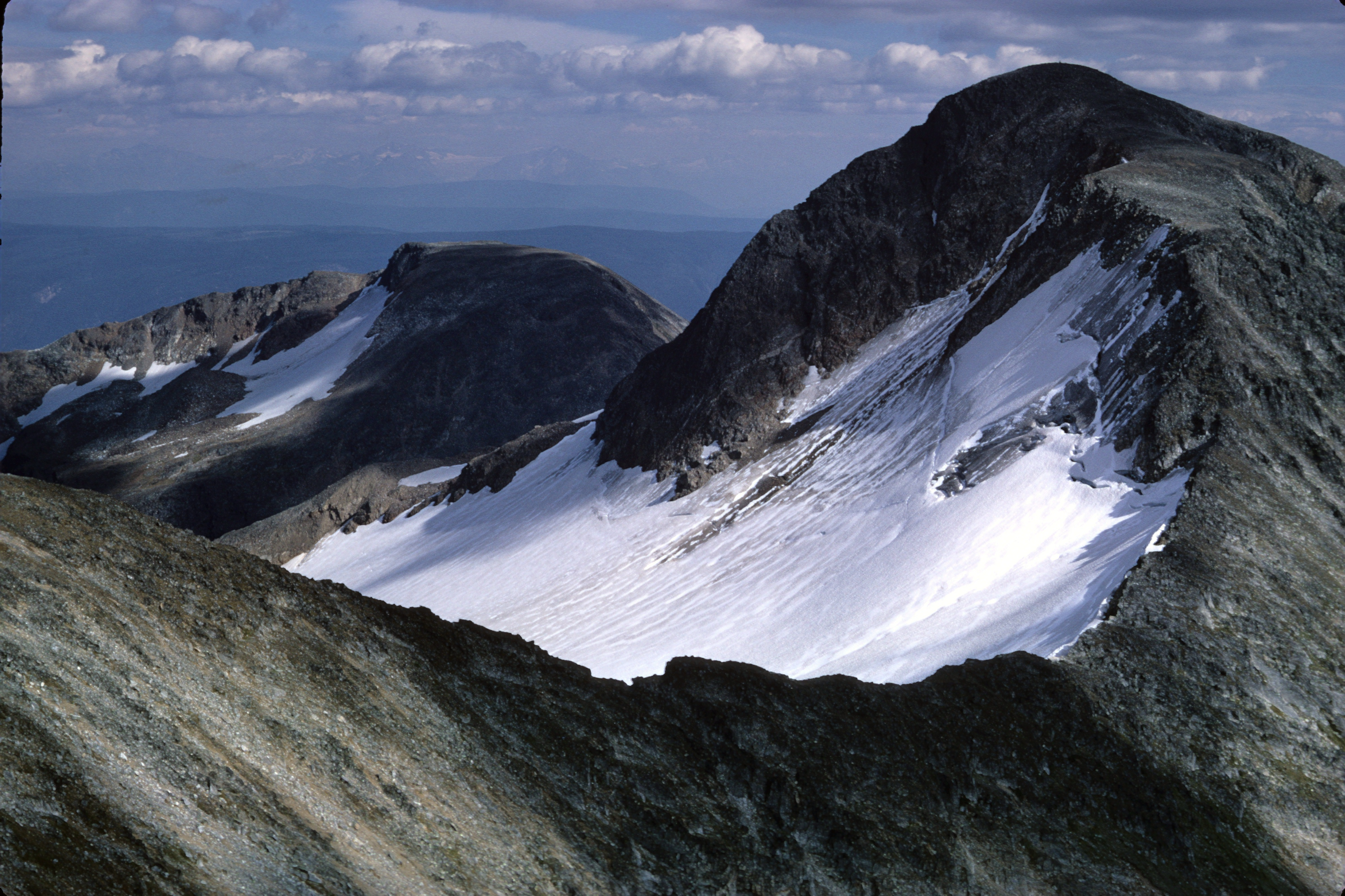
- Highest summit of Trophy Mountain seen from DeKelver Summit

Highest point
- Elevation: 2,577 m (8,455 ft)
- Prominence: 1,467 m (4,813 ft)
- Listing: Mountains of British Columbia
- Coordinates: 51°47′58″N 119°52′32″W

Geography
- Location within British Columbia
- Interactive map of Trophy Mountain
- Location: British Columbia, Canada
- District: Kamloops Division Yale Land District
- Parent range: Shuswap Highland; Monashee Mountains
- Topo map: NTS 82M13 West Raft River or PS-WG3 (south half)

Geology
- Mountain type: Pyramidal peak

Climbing
- Easiest route: Via DeKelver Summit and West Ridge

Trophy Mountain (locally called Trophy Mountains or The Trophies) is a mountain in east-central British Columbia, Canada, located in the south-east region of Wells Gray Provincial Park. The Clearwater River flows to the west, Raft River to the east and Spahats Creek to the south. Trophy Mountain is part of the Shuswap Highland. There are nine summits in the group and the highest is 2,577 m (8,455 ft). Battle Mountain and Table Mountain are the closest summits to the north and Raft Mountain is immediately south. Trophy Mountain was given its name by Dan Case, a big-game hunting guide in the area.

Trophy Mountain is easily accessible by road and trail. It is a popular summer tourist attraction and is especially noted for colourful alpine meadows. Several hiking trails and routes are available.

== Access ==
Trophy Mountain Road turns east off Clearwater Valley Road (also called Wells Gray Park Road) 11.3 km (7.0 mi) north of the Yellowhead Highway. The gravel road is steep and rough, and usable by all vehicles except those with very low clearance. It is 13 km (8.1 mi) to the parking lot.

A well-used trail starts here and climbs 300 m (984 ft) through a band of trees to the alpine meadows. The leisurely hike of 3.1 km (1.9 mi) takes about 75 minutes to reach an abandoned shepherd's hut. During the last 30 minutes, there are views of the north face of Raft Mountain across Spahats Creek Valley to the south. This section of the meadows has colourful flower displays in late July and early August, as well as an earlier bloom of glacier lilies in late June. The trail continues past the hut for 30 minutes to the Sheila Lake Lookout. This viewpoint encompasses Sheila Lake to the north, Plateau of Lakes with numerous tarns to the northeast, and four of the nine Trophy summits beyond that. Raft Mountain and the spire of Dunn Peak are to the south.

A few primitive campsites and an outhouse are located near Sheila Lake for the benefit of backpackers. Trails continue past Sheila Lake and the Lookout across the Plateau of Lakes. The hiking season on Trophy Mountain is from late June through September.

== History ==
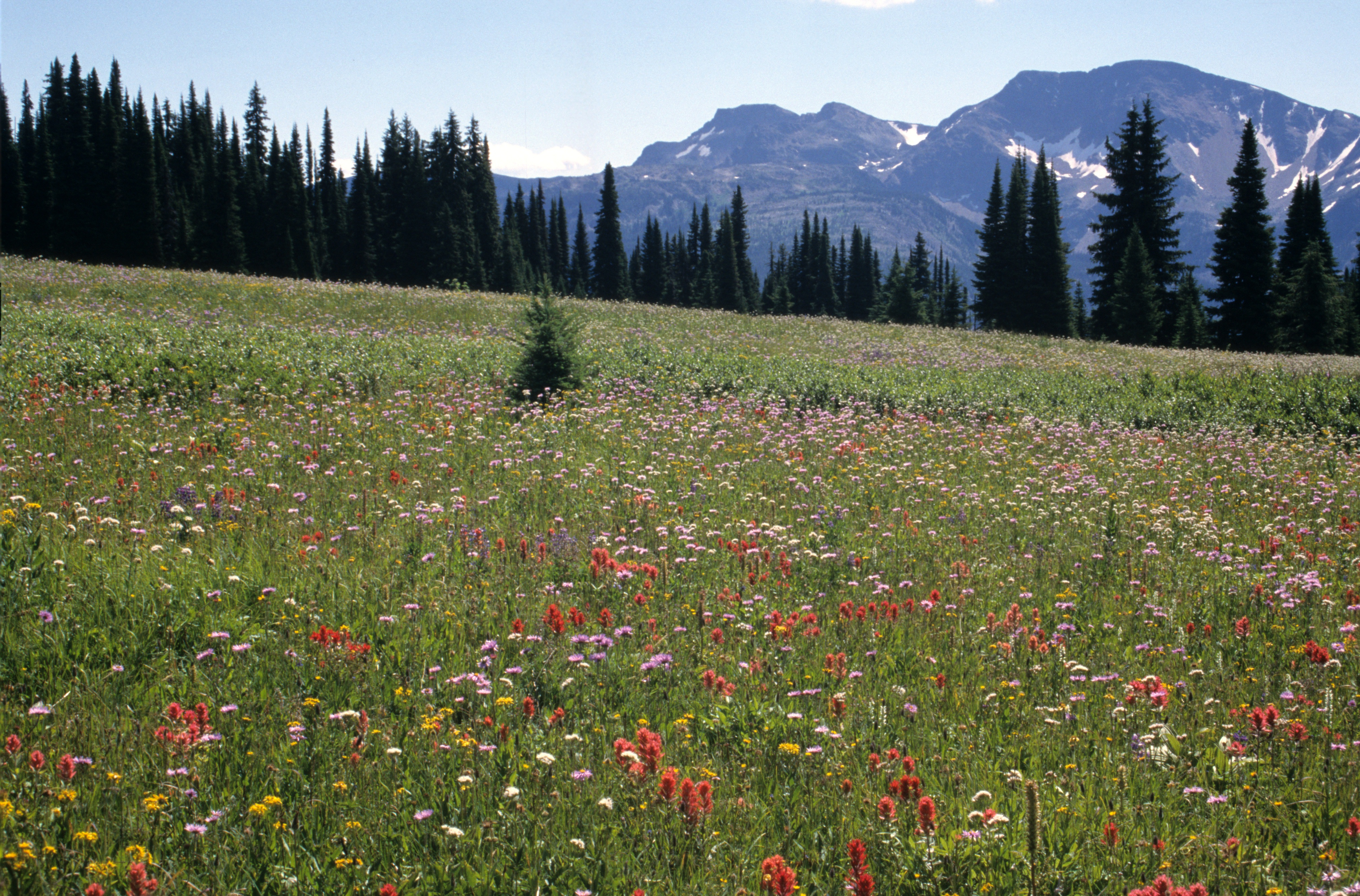
Trophy Flower Meadows in early August

The shepherd's hut was built by brothers John and Frank Ronacher in the 1950s when they herded sheep on the Trophy meadows. At that time, the access was via a rough trail up Third Canyon which the Ronachers widened with a bulldozer. Frank died in 1962 and later that year John sold the Trophy grazing lease and 100 ewes and rams to Emil and Ida DeKelver. They arrived in the Clearwater Valley in 1958 and settled on an 80-acre farm beside Candle Creek. At first, the DeKelvers raised dairy cattle then, after purchasing the Ronacher business, were busy with their sheep. Soon they had expanded the herd to 300 and were very successful with the lush Trophy grasslands. In 1969, mounting government pressure against grazing lease-holders persuaded the DeKelvers to switch to guiding and trail-riding on the Trophy Mountains. They built a new trail up Spahats Creek which was much shorter than the Third Canyon route, although strenuous compared to today's stroll to the meadows. When logging started on the Trophy Mountains in 1979 and roads were built almost to treeline, the DeKelvers’ business was ruined and they retired to their Candle Creek farm. Ida spent many years collecting historic artifacts from the Clearwater Valley and developing the Yellowhead Museum which is now closed. Meanwhile, high on Trophy Mountain, the shepherd's hut is being ravaged by the alpine weather and soon there will be no evidence of the days when these meadows were home to hundreds of sheep.

DeKelver Summit is west of the highest summit and remembers Ida and Emil DeKelver. Ronacher Lake is west of Sheila Lake and refers to the Ronacher brothers.

The south boundary of Wells Gray Park was originally established in 1939 through Grouse Creek Valley just north of Trophy Mountain. In 1997, the park was expanded to include the mountain above its treeline.

== Geology ==
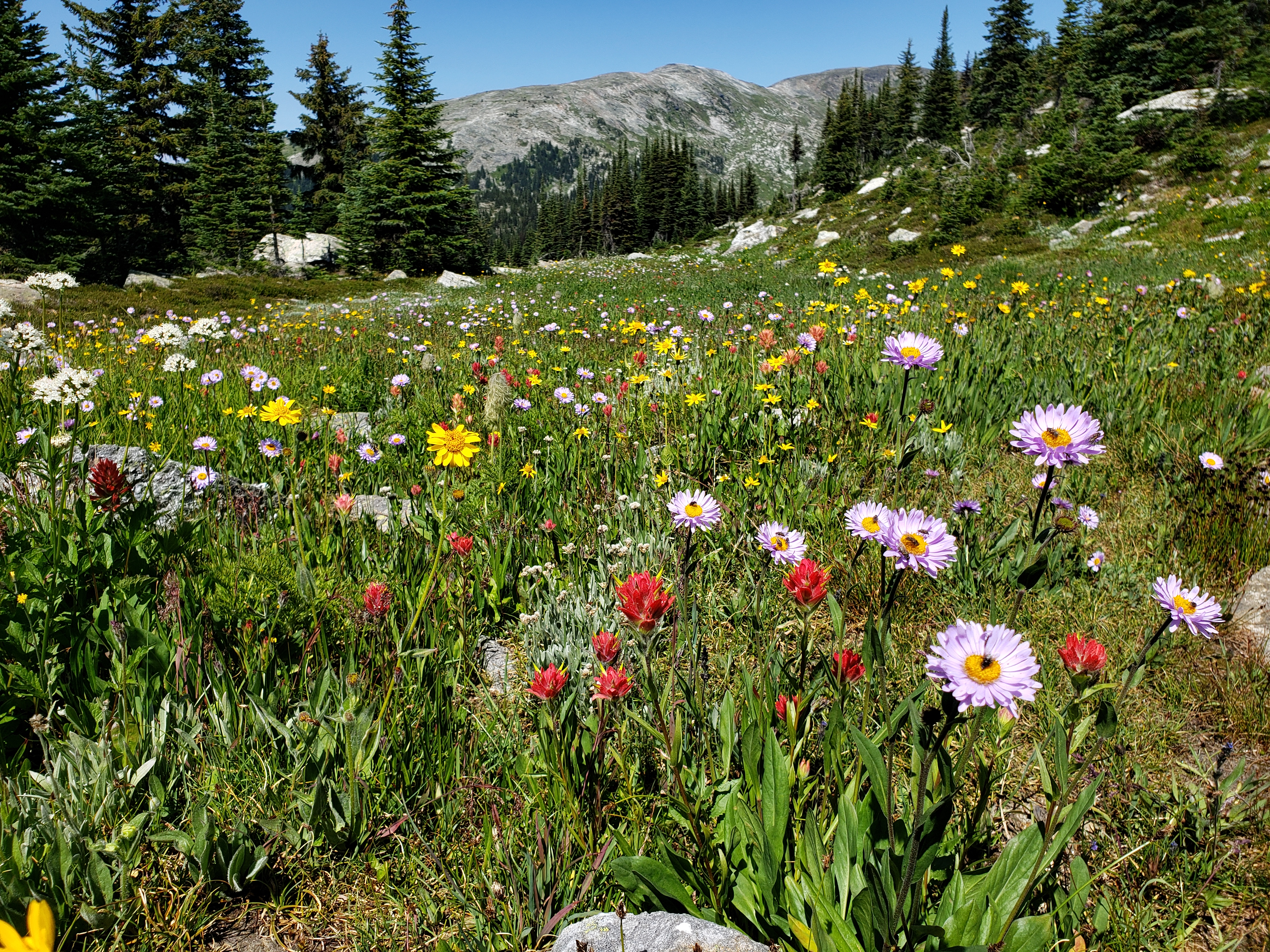
Trophy Flower Meadows

Most of the rock comprising Trophy Mountain is part of the ancient Shuswap Metamorphic Complex which arches across the British Columbia Interior in a wide band from Shuswap Lake to Adams Lake and into the Quesnel Highland. No age has been established, but it was intruded by the Raft Batholith about 100 million years ago. The glaciers of the Pleistocene and earlier ice ages have scoured Trophy Mountain creating numerous bowls now filled by lakes and the rugged north face which is 700 m (2,297 ft) high.

Much of the lava which accumulated in the Clearwater Valley near Spahats Creek was spewed out from fissures on the west side of Trophy Mountain between 500,000 and 300,000 years ago. Evidence of a more recent volcanic era is seen in the Buck Hill cinder cone at the 1,600 m (5,249 ft) level of Trophy Mountain and in what is possibly a water-filled volcanic crater at the headwaters of Third Canyon Creek.

Wells Gray Park's southernmost glacier is on the north side of Trophy Mountain and can be seen from the West Summit.

== Hikes and climbs ==
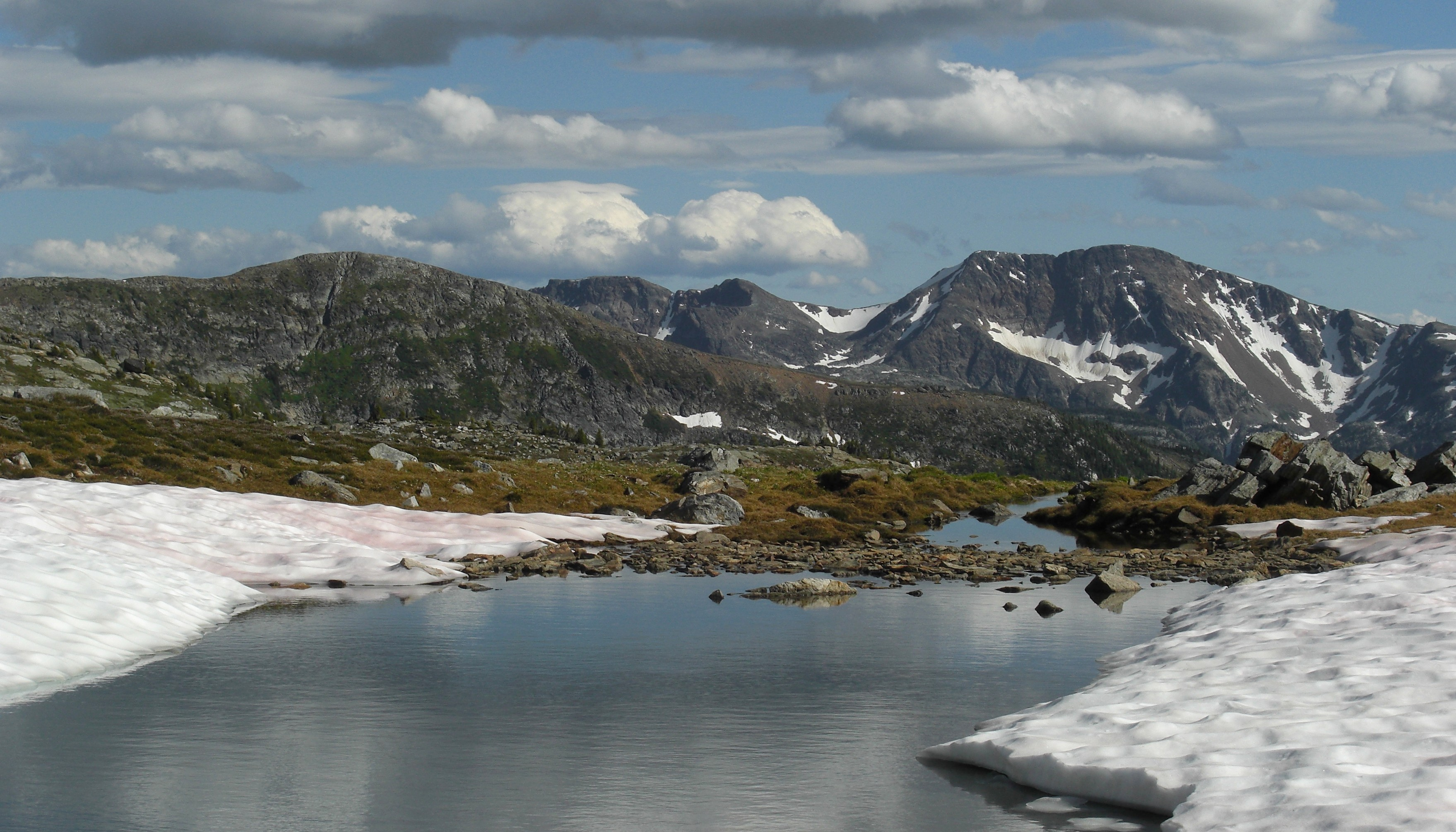
Alpine meadows with Raft Mountain

Detailed descriptions of these hikes and starting points are in Exploring Wells Gray Park (7th edition).

- Long Hill – westernmost summit, elevation 2,343 m (7,687 ft). About two hours one-way from Sheila Lake.
- DeKelver Summit – elevation 2,532 m (8,307 ft). About two hours one-way from Sheila Lake via Lake of the Rock. Garnet Peak, third highest in Wells Gray Park, and Mount Robson, highest in the Canadian Rockies, can be seen from here.
- Trophy Skyline – This is a rewarding hike with panoramic views that connects DeKelver Summit and Long Hill. About five hours round trip from Sheila Lake.
- Trophy Summit – This rigorous hike takes 12 hours round trip from the parking lot or 9 hours from Sheila Lake. The route is via DeKelver Summit then the narrow West Ridge with scrambling to the main summit. An alternate return route is via Cwem Cwem Lake and Silvertip Creek.
- East Ridges – The driving access is via Spahats Creek Valley to the pass. The unsigned trail takes about two hours to the meadows. A longer hike goes to the East Summits and Wolverine Basin, and takes about six hours return.
