= Gage Hill =

- Location within British Columbia
- Interactive map of Gage Hill

Highest point
- Elevation: 1,090 m (3,580 ft)
- Coordinates: 52.05°N 120.01°W

Geography
- Location: British Columbia, Canada

Geology
- Rock age: Pleistocene
- Mountain type: Tuya
- Volcanic field: Wells Gray-Clearwater volcanic field
- Last eruption: Pleistocene

Gage Hill is a tuya in east-central British Columbia, Canada, located in Wells Gray Provincial Park.

== See also ==
- List of volcanoes in Canada
- Volcanism of Canada
- Volcanism of Western Canada
