= Flatiron (volcano) =

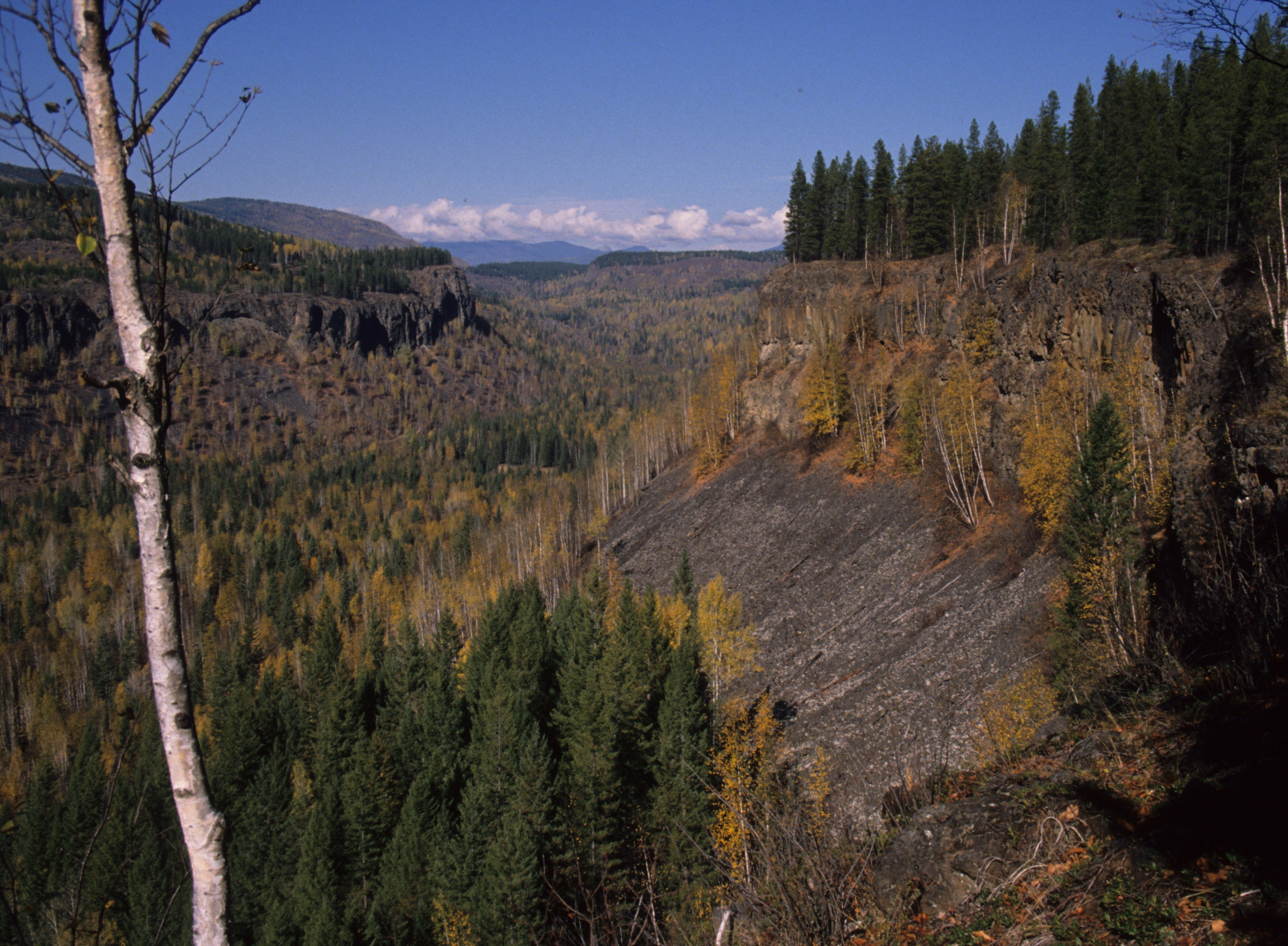
- Lava cliffs in Hemp Canyonlands near the Flatiron

Highest point
- Elevation: 730 m (2,395 ft)
- Prominence: 90 m (295 ft)
- Coordinates: 51.88°N 120.05°W

Geography
- Location: British Columbia, Canada

Geology
- Rock age: Pleistocene
- Mountain type: Volcanic outcrop
- Volcanic field: Wells Gray-Clearwater volcanic field
- Last eruption: 200,000 years

Climbing
- Easiest route: Trail and bushwhack from Clearwater Valley Road

The Flatiron is the name for an eroded volcanic outcrop in east-central British Columbia, Canada, located in Wells Gray Provincial Park.

The Flatiron is 90 m (295 ft) high, 500 m (1,640 ft) long and generally about 125 m (410 ft) wide. It is flanked by Hemp Creek to the west and Trout Creek to the east.

== Geology ==
About 200,000 years ago, a lake formed in the Hemp Canyonlands with its upper end near the meeting of Trout and Hemp creeks. The lake bottom was about 60 m (197 ft) above the present bottom of the Hemp Creek Valley. The surface of the lake was the rim of the Hemp cliffs a few kilometres south of The Flatiron. The lake was created by a blockage downstream on the Clearwater River, but its actual location is unknown, and this could have been an ice dam, a landslide or a lava flow. The Flatiron erupted into this lake and was once much bigger than today. This action is called a ponded lava flow. The lava used to extend right across the Hemp Creek Valley, but floods from melting glaciers carried away the lava and left The Flatiron as a remnant. The water flow might have been 100 times the size of Hemp Creek today. The lava that is exposed today cooled very slowly and formed into columns, one of the park’s finest examples of columnar basalt. The columns that make up the Flatiron have been falling away regularly and piling up at the base, so the Flatiron keeps gets thinner.

== Access ==
A one-hour hike from Clearwater Valley Road (also called Wells Gray Park Road) leads to a viewpoint of the Hemp Canyonlands with the Flatiron in the distance. After another 30 minutes hiking, it is necessary to leave the trail and bushwhack to the base of the Flatiron. As the cliffs almost surround the Flatiron, the only access to the top is a scramble from the west side above Hemp Creek.

== See also ==
- List of volcanoes in Canada
- Volcanism of Canada
- Volcanism of Western Canada
