= Jack's Jump =

- Location within British Columbia
- Interactive map of Jack's Jump

Highest point
- Elevation: 1,895 m (6,217 ft)
- Coordinates: 52.12°N 120.05°W

Geography
- Location: British Columbia, Canada

Geology
- Rock age: Pleistocene
- Mountain type: Subglacial volcano
- Volcanic field: Wells Gray-Clearwater volcanic field
- Last eruption: Pleistocene

Jack's Jump is a subglacial volcano in east-central British Columbia, Canada, located in south-central Wells Gray Provincial Park.

== See also ==
- List of volcanoes in Canada
- Volcanism of Canada
- Volcanism of Western Canada
