= Pointed Stick Cone =

- Location within British Columbia
- Interactive map of Pointed Stick Cone

Highest point
- Elevation: 1,820 m (5,970 ft)
- Coordinates: 52.24°N 120.08°W

Geography
- Location: British Columbia, Canada

Geology
- Rock age: Holocene
- Mountain type: Cinder cone
- Volcanic field: Wells Gray-Clearwater volcanic field
- Last eruption: Holocene

Pointed Stick Cone is a cinder cone in east-central British Columbia, Canada, located in Wells Gray Provincial Park.

== See also ==
- List of volcanoes in Canada
- Volcanism of Canada
- Volcanism of Western Canada
