= Ray Lake =

Lake in British Columbia, Canada

- Location within British Columbia
- Location: British Columbia
- Coordinates: 52°14′N 120°04′W
- Primary inflows: Falls Creek
- Primary outflows: Falls Creek
- Basin countries: Canada
- Max. length: 3.5 km (2.2 mi)
- Surface elevation: 1,350 m (4,429 ft)

Ray Lake is a lake located in Wells Gray Provincial Park, east-central British Columbia, Canada. It is fed by and drained by Falls Creek which flows into the Clearwater River at its outlet from Clearwater Lake.

== Naming ==
Ray Lake and Mount Ray to the west are named for John Ray who homesteaded near The Horseshoe on the Clearwater River in 1911. He cleared land and built a small cabin beside what is now called Alice Lake. A larger cabin was built in 1929 which still stands today. In 1932, after 21 years of a solitary lifestyle, at the age of 54, he married Alice Ludtke who was only 20. They raised three children on their remote farm, Nancy, Doug and Robert. The Ray family left their farm in 1946 so the children could benefit from a school education. A year later, John was still moving equipment and the family's belongings out to Clearwater on the long trail south through the Clearwater Valley. His last trip to the farm was in December 1947 and he died there of a heart attack. Alice died in 1959 at age 47 from cancer. Their graves are near the house.

== Access ==
Visits to Ray Lake are very rare due to difficult access. The nearest trail is the overgrown Kostal Lake Trail, over 5 km (3.1 mi) to the south. Falls Creek is impassable for boats. Float planes and helicopters are not allowed to land at Ray Lake.

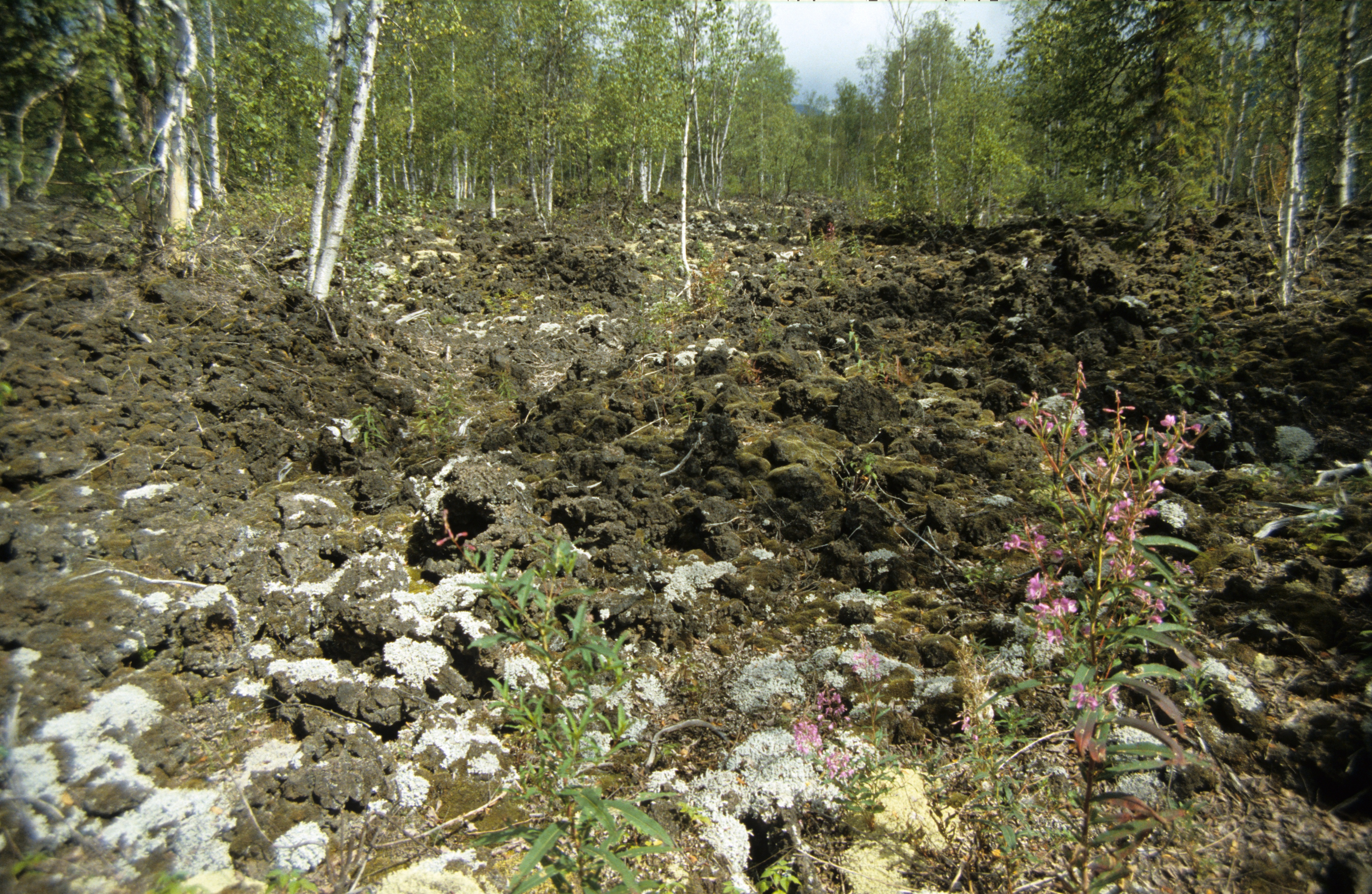
Dragon's Tongue southwest of Ray Lake

== Geology ==
Mount Ray, west of Ray Lake, erupted about 20,000 years ago when glacial ice just covered the mountain. Soon the eruption melted through the ice. This formation is called a tuya. The ice covered the mountain again after the eruption ended. Mount Ray has a distinctly red summit and can be seen from Clearwater Lake.

Dragon Cone, just east of Ray Lake, erupted about 7,500 years ago and the lava, called the Dragon's Tongue, flowed 15 km (9.3 mi) down Falls Creek Valley. Ray Lake was dammed and enlarged by this lava. The toe of this lava flow dammed the Clearwater River and raised the level of Clearwater Lake by about 5 m (16 ft). A hiking trail from Clearwater Lake Campground gives access to the Dragon's Tongue where it consists of piles of jagged aa lava.

== See also ==
- List of lakes of British Columbia
