= Spahats Creek Falls =

Waterfall on Spahats Creek in Wells Gray Provincial Park, British Columbia, Canada

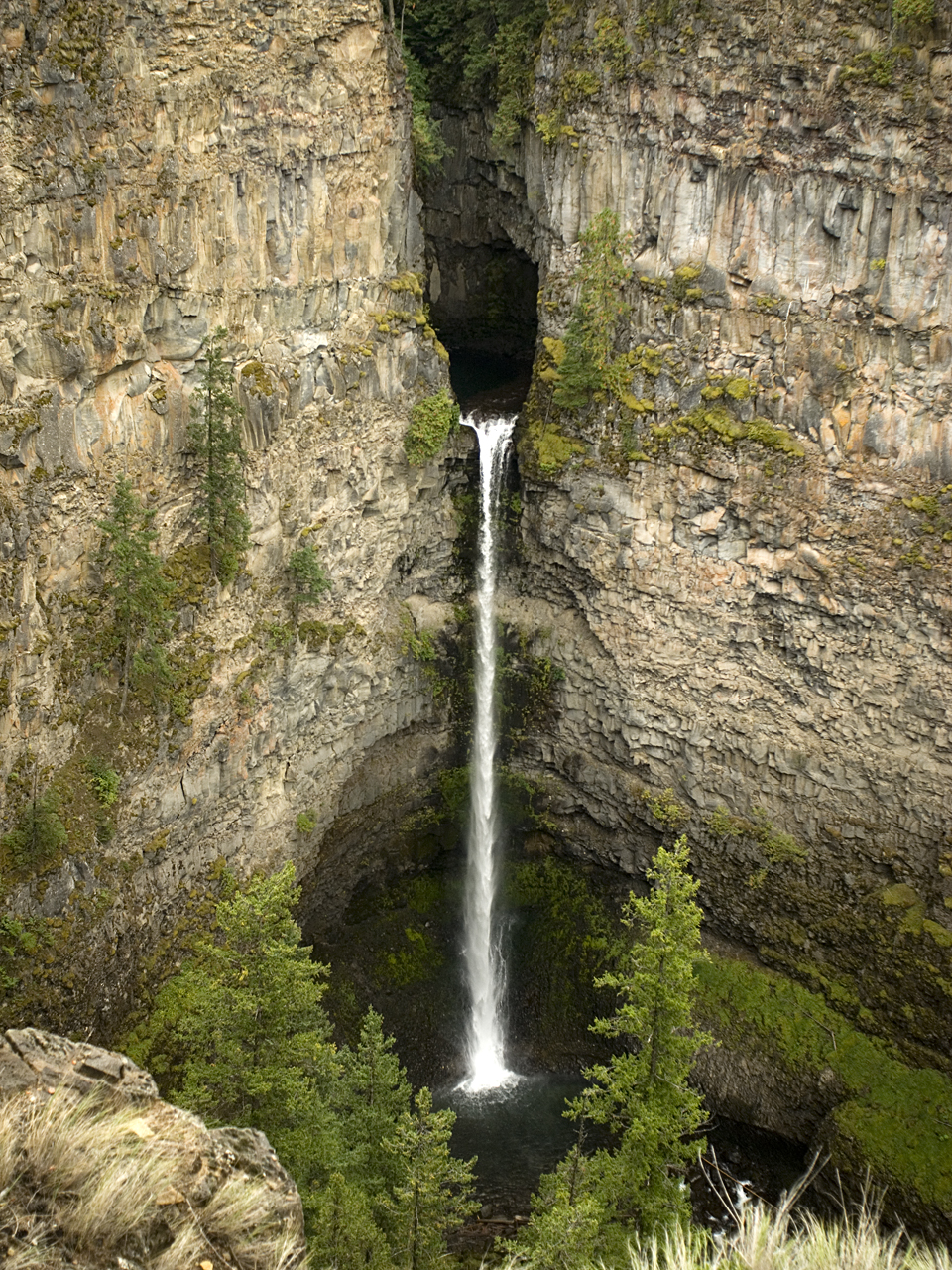
- Interactive map of Spahats Creek Falls
- Location: Wells Gray Provincial Park
- Coordinates: 51°44′10.07″N 120°00′51.3″W
- Type: Plunge
- Total height: 246 feet (75 m)
- Number of drops: 2
- Longest drop: 200 feet (61 m)
- Total width: 25 feet (7.6 m)
- Watercourse: Spahats Creek

Spahats Creek Falls, also called Spahats Falls, is a waterfall on Spahats Creek within Wells Gray Provincial Park of British Columbia, Canada. Common references place the falls at around 60 m (197 ft) tall, but taking into account the second tier, it is closer to 75–80 meters tall. It is a popular stop for tourists and especially motorcoach tours since it is only 10 km (6.2 mi) off the busy Yellowhead Highway.

Spahats Creek rises from snowmelt and springs at a pass between Raft Mountain and Trophy Mountain. It flows 15 km west before tumbling over Spahats Falls and entering the Clearwater River.

Spahats is the First Nations term for bear and the stream was long known as Bear Creek. When the first accurate topographical map of the Clearwater Valley was published in 1953, it labelled the stream as “Bear Creek” and the falls as “Spahats (Bear) Creek Falls”. By the late 1960s, “Spahats” had become an accepted alternative due to the large number of Bear creeks in British Columbia (currently 20) and was officially adopted.

These impressive natural features used to be protected as tiny Spahats Creek Provincial Park, but in 1997 the boundaries of Wells Gray Provincial Park were expanded south along the Clearwater River and included Spahats. Tourists today see the anomaly of a "Wells Gray Park" entrance sign beside the road just south of Spahats Creek and another, more elaborate, sign 25 km (15.5 mi) further north. Spahats Creek Park used to have its own 20-unit campground with an attractive location deep in an old-growth forest, but in 2006 it was closed and converted into a gigantic parking lot.

== Formation ==
Like the larger Helmcken Falls, Spahats Falls owes its formation to deposits of volcanic rock in the Wells Gray-Clearwater volcanic field. Starting about 300,000 years ago, numerous eruptions from Trophy Mountain poured into the Clearwater River Valley and filled it layer upon layer to a depth of over 300 m (980 ft). Eruptions in various parts of this valley continued sporadically for 200,000 years, producing some 25 km^{3} (6.0 mi^{3}) of lava and creating Wells Gray Park features such as Murtle Plateau. After the eruptions, the Clearwater River re-established its course and began cutting into the lava. During the Pleistocene, gigantic icefields scraped away at the lava. When all this ice melted, the floods completed the carving of Granite Canyon on the Clearwater River and the side canyon where Spahats Falls occurs.

== Trails ==
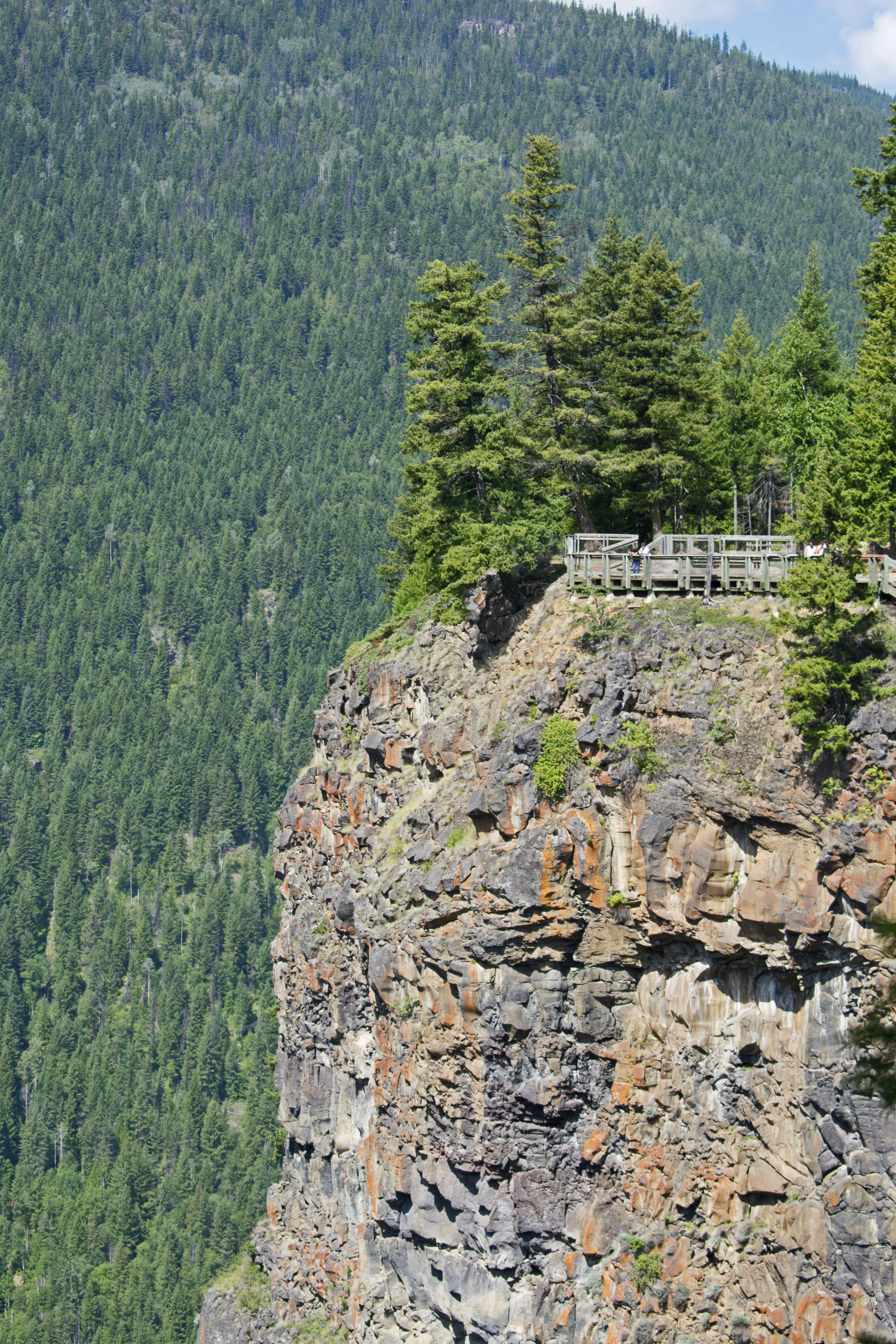
The observation platform

- The main trail from the parking lot to the falls viewing platform takes about 5 mins to walk.
- An alternate and slightly longer trail goes from the parking lot along the edge of Spahats Creek Canyon and joins the main trail.
- A scenic trail starts at the viewing platform and goes north along the rim of Granite Canyon. It is a 20-minute walk to the Clearwater Valley Overlook. Return the same way or follow the access road back to the parking lot.
- A short trail from the south-east corner of the parking lot follows Spahats Creek upstream to a small loop trail originally built as a nature trail for the former campground. A 5-minute walk leads to a stand of impressive old growth red cedar trees.
- The bottom of Spahats Falls is a strenuous scramble that starts at the viewing platform and quickly descends 300 m. Don't go during May and June when the canyon is very wet and the creek may be in flood.
- The Clearwater River Trail is 10.8 km (6.7 mi) one-way and goes north to rejoin the park road north of Third Canyon. It can also be accessed at First Canyon for a shorter hike. The Spahats Canyon footbridge was washed out in 2020 and has not been replaced by BC Parks.
- A trail to the Natural Bridge starts 1.5 km south of the Spahats turnoff and takes less than 30 minutes each way. The trailhead signage is not easily visible. The trail is rough and steep with hazardous dropoffs.
- For detailed descriptions of these trails, refer to the guidebook Exploring Wells Gray Park.

== See also ==
- Wells Gray-Clearwater volcanic field
- List of waterfalls
- List of waterfalls of Canada
- List of waterfalls in British Columbia
- Volcanism in Canada
- Wells Gray Provincial Park
