= Volcan Rumoka =

Rumoka

Highest point
- Elevation: 1,711 m (5,614 ft)
- Coordinates: 1°35′S 29°07′E

Geography
- Location: Nord-Kivu, Democratic Republic of the Congo

Geology
- Mountain type: Cinder cone
- Last eruption: 1912-13

Volcan Rumoka, also known as Rumoka and Le Rumoka, is a cinder cone volcano in the Virunga Mountains in Nord Kivu, Democratic Republic of the Congo (formerly known as Zaire). The volcano is a minor satellite cone on the flanks of the massive shield volcano of Nyamuragira. It is located about 16 km (10 mi) south of Nyamuragira's caldera.

Rumoka last erupted in 1912 and 1913, with the lava beginning to flow in December 1912, and continuing until March 1913. In February 1913, Nyamuragira also erupted, prompting speculation that the two were affecting one another in some manner.
