= Flourmill Volcanoes =

Volcanoes in British Columbia, Canada

- The Flourmills
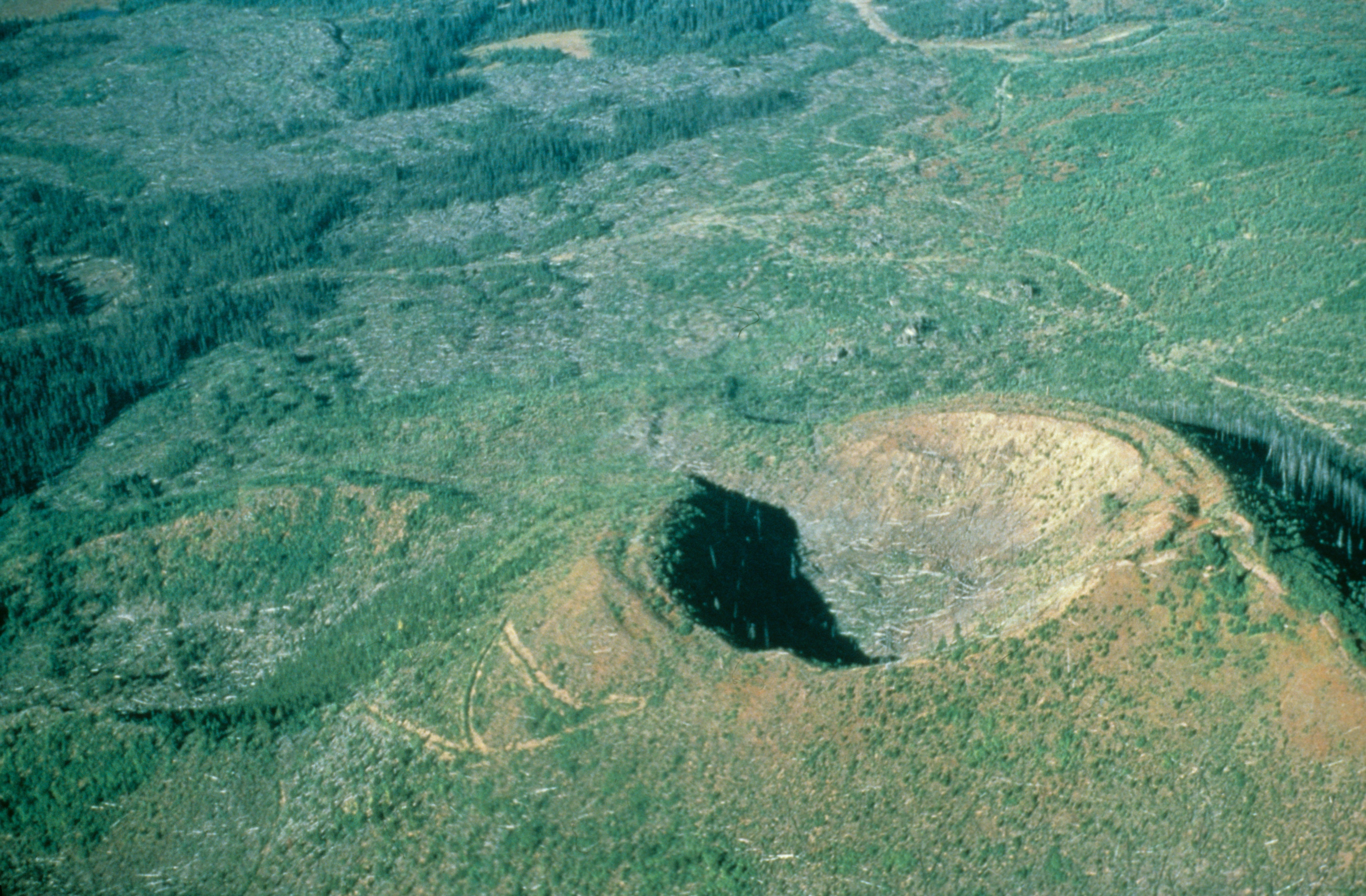
- Flourmill Centre as seen from the northeast

Highest point
- Peak: Spanish Lake Centre
- Elevation: 1,770 m (5,810 ft)
- Coordinates: 52°03′9.47″N 120°18′59.53″W

Geography
- Location within British Columbia
- Location in Wells Gray Provincial Park
- Country: Canada
- Province: British Columbia
- District: Cariboo Land District
- Parent range: Quesnel Highland
- Topo map: NTS 93A1 Ray Lake

Geology
- Rock age: Holocene
- Volcanic field: Wells Gray-Clearwater volcanic field

The Flourmill Volcanoes, also known as The Flourmills, are a small volcano range near the west boundary of Wells Gray Provincial Park in east-central British Columbia, Canada. Located north of Mahood Lake and west of the Clearwater River, they form part of the Wells Gray-Clearwater volcanic field.

== Geography ==
Two volcanic centres form the range, namely Flourmill Centre and Spanish Lake Centre. During volcanic activity 3,000 years ago, the craters of two cinder cones were breached, and lava flowed out the south side into the pass between Spanish Creek and Flourmill Creek. The lava then dammed Spanish Creek, creating Spanish Lake, occupying about 10 km (6.2 mi) of the Spanish valley to the southwest. This lava flow averages 10 m (33 ft) thick. Both cones were built upon unweathered glacial material.

=== Spanish Lake Centre ===
Situated 2.5 km (1.6 mi) east of Spanish Lake is the northerly Spanish Lake Centre with an elevation of 1,770 m (5,810 ft). It consists of an older major cone and two younger parasitic cones. The older edifice is breached in the southwest by two lava flows and contains an inner younger cone that is breached on its north side by a lava flow from a flank eruption. Both cones comprise unconsolidated irregular volcanic blocks with little agglutinate, with the inner cone incorporating weathered bipolar fusiform bombs.

The older of the two parasitic cones is situated on the eastern rim of the major cone while the younger cone lies on the eastern flank of the older parasitic cone. Both cones contain a higher proportion of agglutinate material than the major cone. The younger parasitic cone has a 20 m (66 ft) deep crater, which formed during the final phase of activity of the Spanish Lake Centre.

Lava flows from two flank eruptions travelled westward into the Spanish Creek valley. That on the northern rim of the Spanish Lake Centre flowed out of a breach in the outer wall to the west and inward through a breach in the north wall of the inner cone. A stream section through the flow indicates that it is 7 to 10 m (23 to 33 ft) thick. The second more extensive lava flow originated from the southwest wall of the inner cone and destroyed a large portion of the outer cone. The flow is of a thickness comparable to the north flow.

=== Flourmill Centre ===
The Flourmill Centre lies at the headwaters of Flourmill Creek and is the most southerly of the two Flourmill Volcanoes. It has an elevation of 1,495 m (4,905 ft) and rises 250 m (820 ft) above its base. Three overlapping cinder cones of slightly differing ages comprise the Flourmill Centre. The oldest cone lies on the northeastern side and is only partially preserved, with the southeastern side having been destroyed or buried by ejecta from subsequent eruptions. It consists of irregular volcanic blocks and rare bipolar fusiform bombs interlayered with vesicular agglutinate. A breach on the southeast side of the cone drained a central lava lake. The lava flowed southwest into the Spanish Creek valley, carrying rafts of agglutinate from the wall of the cone.

Renewed volcanism on the southwestern flank of the volcano created a parasitic cone composed of loosely consolidated vesicular volcanic blocks interlayered with agglutinate. Several well-preserved spherical and breadcrust bombs as well as poorly preserved bipolar fusiform varieties occur with the irregular volcanic blocks. A breach on the south side of the cone permitted drainage of a lava lake in the crater.

The most recently formed part of the Flourmill Centre is a well-preserved composite cone on the northwest flank. It partially overlies deposits from the southwestern vent and consists of loosely consolidated volcanic bombs pervasively interlayered with agglutinate. The crater is breached on the southwest side and contains the remnants of a lava lake. Late stage activity in the crater formed a small ring of extensively weathered scoriaceous ejecta on the northwest inner wall of the main crater.

Like the Spanish Lake Centre to the north, lava from the Flourmill Centre flowed into the valley of Spanish Creek. Three lava flows have been identified, each having a thickness of 7 to 10 m (23 to 33 ft) along Spanish Creek. The lava beds extend about 15 km (9.3 mi) down the Spanish Creek valley and have a maximum width of 2 km (1.2 mi).

== Human history ==
Fissure in Flourmill lava flow

The unusual name 'Flourmill' dates to a land survey in 1921 along the Clearwater River. Flourmill Creek, which flows southeast from the volcanic area, was found to enter the Clearwater River exactly four miles (6.5 km) due north of the Mahood confluence. As such, it was named Four Mile Creek. When map-makers in the Department of Lands were tasked with placing this on the official map, there were already several Four Mile Creeks in British Columbia, so they changed the letters to produce 'Flourmill' Creek instead. The volcanoes derive their name from the creek, and were first referred to in this way in the 1974 edition of the book, Exploring Wells Gray Park. (In 2024, British Columbia had 14 Four Mile Creeks, 2 Four Mile Lakes, and 3 Four Mile Mountains.)

The first recorded visit by non-indigenous people to the Flourmill Volcanoes was on May 21, 1874, by the Canadian Pacific Surveyor Joseph Hunter and three assistants. His diary describes their journey over the Flourmill lava flow:

"I had to send the pack train back...on account of the absence of feed and the rough nature of the valley, which from here to the summit is covered with volcanic rocks, somewhat similar to the formation near the summit on the Howe Sound Route. In this instance, the surface is not quite so rough and irregular, the rocks are smaller in size, and the volcanic action seems to have been more intense. The centre of the valley here is higher than at the sides by about 100 feet...On the 21st we had travelled about two miles when we came to the end of the volcanic formation, and noticed the water running eastward."

The Flourmill Volcanoes became a political scandal in 1963. Clearwater Timber Products, the major employer in Clearwater, wanted logging rights in Wells Gray Park. Rebuffed in several direct attempts, the company instead purchased a beach estate on Vancouver Island from the Rath family for $186,000, then offered it to the provincial government in exchange for permission to log in Wells Gray Park. The government created Rathtrevor Beach Provincial Park from this arrangement, today one of British Columbia's most popular parks, and gave Clearwater Timber logging rights on 137 km^{2} around The Flourmills. The company built a road along the west bank of the Clearwater River to access this forest tract and during the next six years removed 6.8 million cubic feet of timber, valued at $1.6 million. The deal was cancelled by the NDP government after it was elected in 1972. The bridge at the Mahood River was removed in 1975, preventing access to The Flourmills from the east. The volcanoes were added to Wells Gray Park in 1997, at the same time as Trophy Mountain was added and the Pendleton Lakes were removed from the park.

== Access ==
Access to the Flourmill Volcanoes is by a rough road from 100 Mile House on Highway 97. It has numerous unsigned forks and directions such as those found in Exploring Wells Gray Park are essential. The road ends at the outlet of Spanish Lake and an overgrown trail leads 3.2 km (2.0 mi) to the base of the south cone and 0.5 km (0.3 mi) further to a section of the lava flow.

== See also ==
- List of volcanoes in Canada
- Volcanism of Canada
- Volcanism of Western Canada
