= Kostal Lake =

Lake in British Columbia, Canada

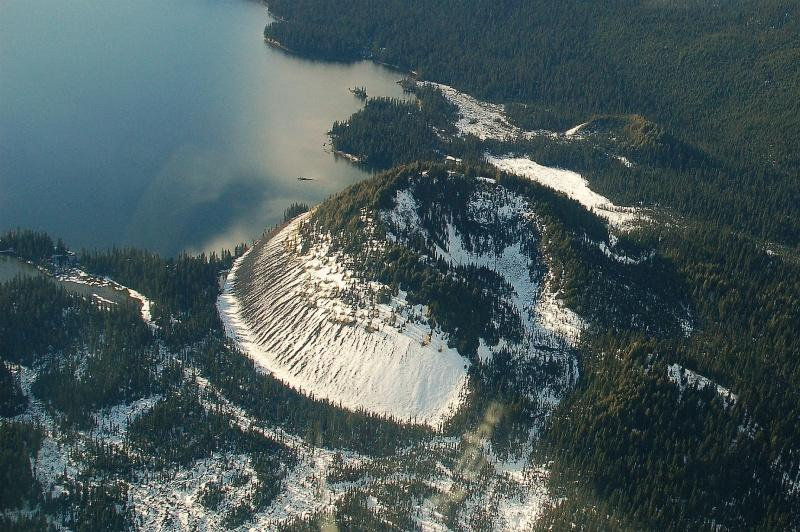
- Lake and Kostal Volcano

- Location within British Columbia
- Location: British Columbia
- Coordinates: 52.164°N 119.976°W
- Primary inflows: minor creeks
- Primary outflows: Kostal Creek to File Creek to Murtle Lake
- Basin countries: Canada
- Max. length: 4.5 km (2.8 mi)
- Max. width: 2.7 km (1.7 mi)
- Surface area: 7.59 km^{2} (2.93 sq mi)
- Max. depth: 19 m (62 ft)
- Shore length^{1}: 23.4 km (14.5 mi)
- Surface elevation: 1,250 m (4,100 ft)
- Islands: 3
- ^{1} Shore length is not a well-defined measure.

Kostal Lake is a lake located in Wells Gray Provincial Park, east-central British Columbia, Canada. It is located west of Murtle Lake and east of Clearwater Lake.

== Naming ==
Kostal Lake was named by Angus Horne in 1936 for Frank Kostal, one of the many trappers and prospectors who visited this remote region during the first quarter of the 20th century. Kostal had a cabin by the lake which he used when collecting animals from his trapline on Kilpill Mountain. Kostal was born in 1901 in Czechoslovakia and died in 1986 in Vancouver.

== Access ==
Visits to Kostal Lake are rare due to difficult access. A trail from Clearwater Lake Campground was built in 1971 and originally extended 40 km (24.9 mi) to McDougall Lake and the west arm of Murtle Lake. The section beyond Kostal Lake has been impassable since the mid-1980s. The rest of the trail was permanently closed by B.C. Parks in 2013 and only the first 1.5 km (0.9 mi) from the campground as far as the Dragon's Tongue lava flow can still be used. A rigorous access route is still possible by canoe up File Creek, then a cross-country hike over the lava flow.

Float planes and helicopters are not allowed to land at Kostal Lake. Landings are permitted at McDougall Lake, 6 km northeast. A permit from B.C. Parks is required.

== Geology ==
Kostal Volcano rises 150 m (492 ft) from the lake's northeast shore. The south and west slopes descend directly into the lake; the lower half consists of barren lava and cinders, but the upper half is sparsely forested. The slopes which face away from the lake are covered with cedar and fir from top to bottom. Kostal is a symmetrical cinder cone with a crater about 80 m (262 ft) deep and a tiny second cone inside it. The initial eruptions created the cone, then subsequent eruptions produced large quantities of lava which flowed through the collapsed east wall of the crater and pooled to a thickness of over 12 m (39 ft). Some lava flowed over 5 km (3.1 mi) east into the valley of File Creek. Geologists are still debating the age of the last eruption here, but it seems likely that Kostal is less than 3,000 years old and therefore the youngest volcano in Wells Gray Park.

== See also ==
- List of lakes of British Columbia
