= Quesnel Highland =

Highland in British Columbia, Canada

- Highlands
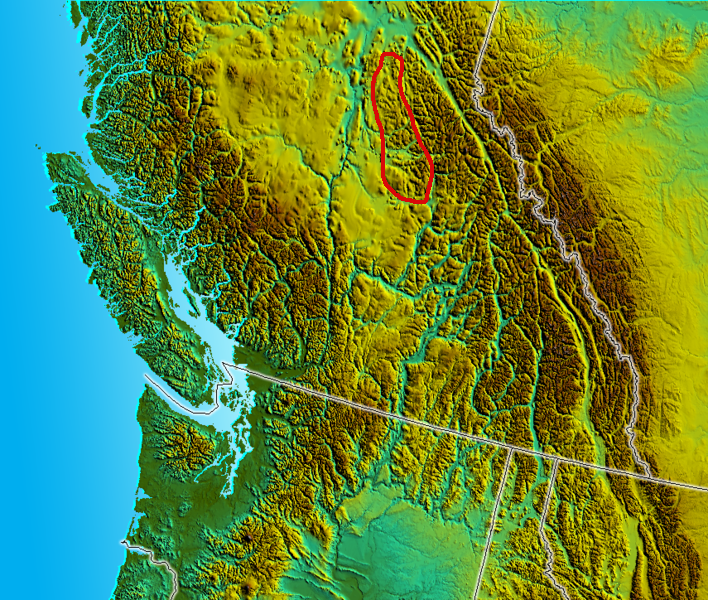
- Approximate boundary of the Quensel Highland
- Coordinates: 52°30′00″N 121°00′00″W
- Location: British Columbia, Canada
- Part of: Cariboo Mountains and Cariboo Plateau

The Quesnel Highland is a geographic area in the Central Interior of the Canadian province of British Columbia. As defined by BC government geographer in Landforms of British Columbia, an account and analysis of British Columbia geography that is often cited as authoritative, the Highland is a complex of upland hill and plateau areas forming and defined as being the buffer between the Cariboo Plateau and the Cariboo Mountains, as a sort of highland foothills along the eastern edge of the Interior Plateau running southeast from a certain point southeast of the city of Prince George to the Mahood Lake area at the southeast corner of the Cariboo. Beyond Mahood Lake lies another separately classified area dubbed by Holland the Shuswap Highland which spans similar terrain across the North Thompson and Shuswap Lake-Adams River drainage basins, forming a similar upland-area buffer between the Thompson Plateau and the Monashee Mountains. A third area, the Okanagan Highland, extends from the southern end of the Shuswap Highland in the area of Vernon and Enderby in the northern Okanagan region into Washington State, and also abuts the Monashee Mountains .

The boundary of the Quesnel Highland is not precisely defined in Holland, and in some interpretations it may be considered to be part of the Interior Plateau, as Holland defines it, or as a subrange of the Cariboo Mountains. Those mountains also, in some reckonings, are classified as part of the Interior Plateau rather than their usual association as the northernmost subrange of the Columbia Mountains. Generally it is composed of the lower, westerly valleys of Horsefly Lake, Quesnel Lake, and the Bowron Lakes, most of the Cariboo goldfield towns and similar terrain northwestwards, to about where the Willow River rounds the northern end of the Cariboo Mountains to join the Fraser River.

== See also ==
- Okanagan Highland
- Shuswap Highland
- Geography of British Columbia
- Geology of British Columbia
- Geology of the Pacific Northwest
- Quesnellia
