= Mount Lyons =

Mountain in British Columbia, Canada

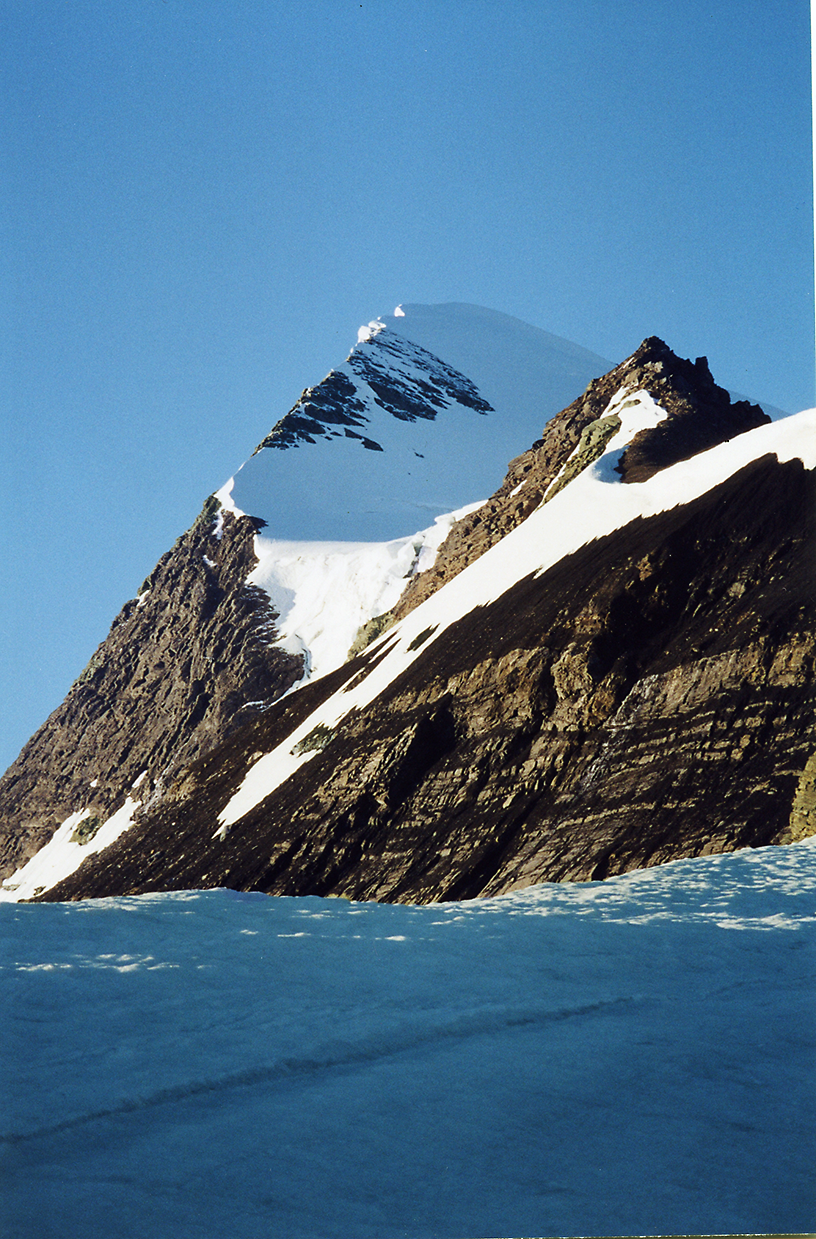
- Mount Lyons from NNW ridge

Highest point
- Elevation: 2,946 m (9,665 ft)
- Listing: Mountains of British Columbia
- Coordinates: 52°52.613′N 120°12.719′W

Geography
- Location within British Columbia
- Location: British Columbia, Canada
- District: Kamloops Division Yale Land District
- Parent range: Cariboo Mountains
- Topo map: 93A16 Mount Winder or PS-WG3 (north half)

Geology
- Mountain type: Pyramidal peak

Climbing
- First ascent: August 18, 2005
- Easiest route: Via col north of Mount Pierrway

Mount Lyons is a mountain in east-central British Columbia, Canada, located near the headwaters of the Clearwater River. Situated in the Cariboo Mountains of the Columbia Mountains, it is the highest mountain in Wells Gray Provincial Park with an elevation of 2,946 m (9,665 ft).

The first ascent of Mount Lyons was on August 18, 2005 by Roger Wallis and Bill McKenzie from the Alpine Club of Canada. They established its height at 2,946 m (9,665 ft) which positioned it as Wells Gray Park's highest mountain. This was 16 m (52 ft) higher than nearby Mount Goodall and 70 m (230 ft) higher than Garnet Peak which had been believed to be the Park's highest since its first ascent in 1974.

Mount Lyons is named for Chester Peter "Chess" Lyons. In 1940, six months after Wells Gray Park was created, he was assigned by the B.C. Forest Service to explore and map the area. He was only 24 years old. The park boundaries had been arbitrarily flung around the drainage basin of the Clearwater River and few people knew what had been included in this huge new park. Numerous place names in the park can be attributed to the Lyons expedition. Later he was a naturalist, author of many books, and professional photographer.
