= Chester Lyons =

Chester Lyons may refer to:

- C. P. Lyons (Chester Peter Lyons), Canadian outdoorsman and natural historian
- Chester A. Lyons, American cinematographer
