= Clearwater Lake (British Columbia) =

Lake in British Columbia, Canada

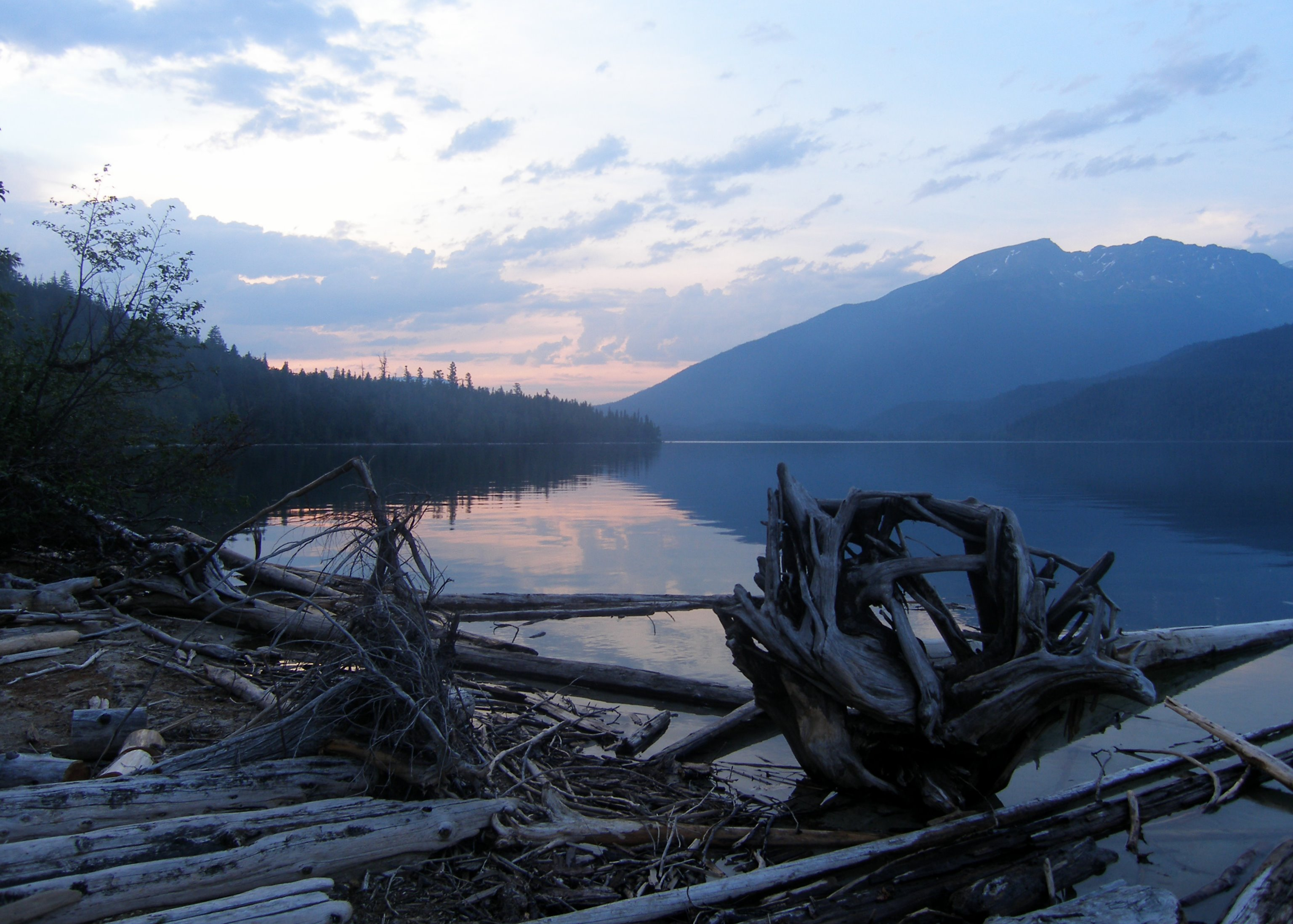
- Clearwater Lake

- Location within British Columbia
- Location: British Columbia
- Coordinates: 52°14′N 120°12′W
- Primary inflows: Clearwater River
- Primary outflows: Clearwater River
- Basin countries: Canada
- Max. length: 24 km (14.9 mi)
- Max. width: 2.6 km (1.6 mi)
- Surface area: 33.26 km^{2} (12.84 sq mi)
- Average depth: 101.6 m (333 ft)
- Max. depth: 197 m (646 ft)
- Water volume: 3.38 km^{3} (0.81 cu mi)
- Shore length^{1}: 57.97 km (36 mi)
- Surface elevation: 680 m (2,231 ft)
- Islands: None
- Settlements: None
- ^{1} Shore length is not a well-defined measure.

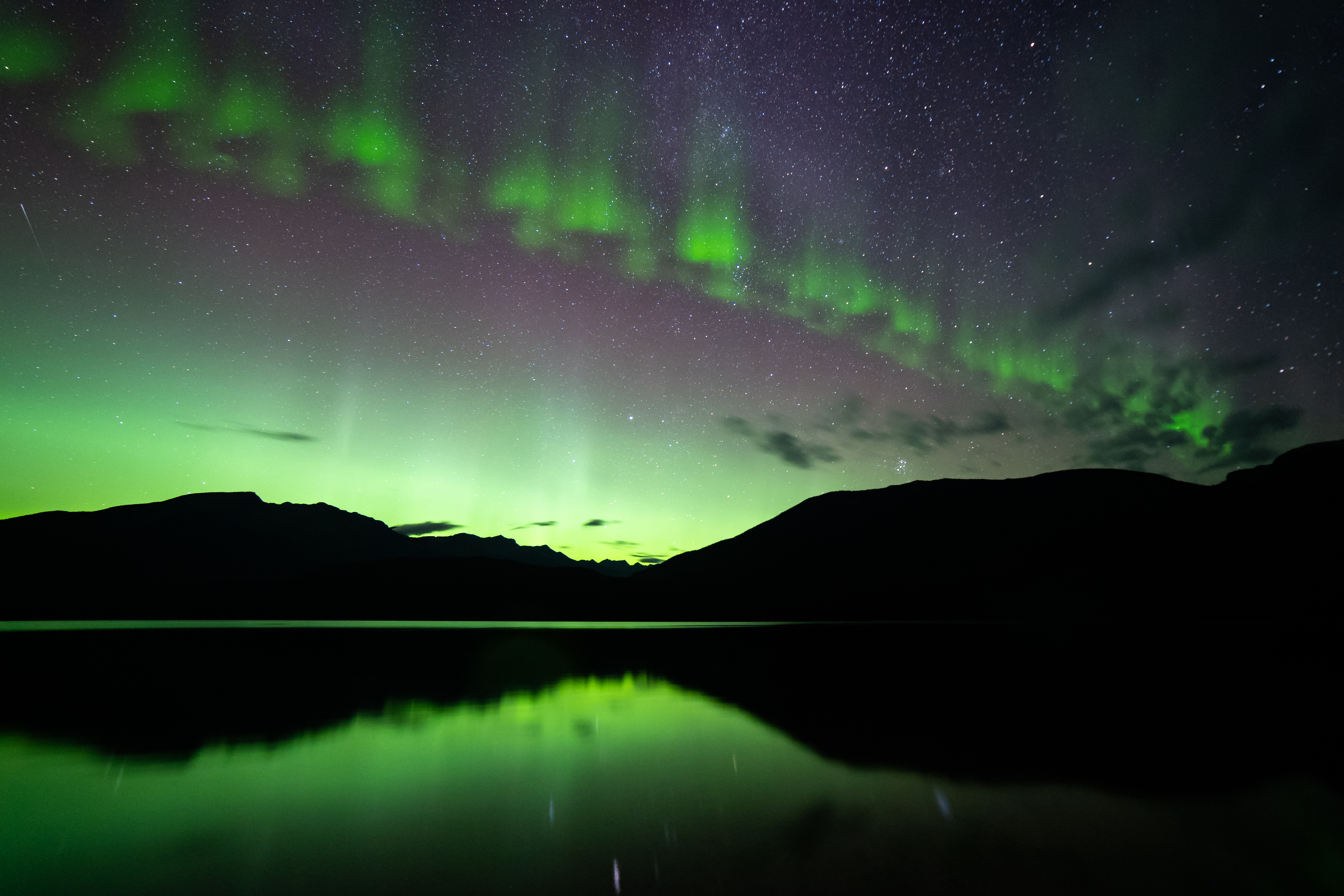
Aurora at Clearwater Lake

Clearwater Lake is one of six large lakes in Wells Gray Provincial Park in east-central British Columbia, Canada. The Clearwater River enters the lake at its north end, flowing from Hobson Lake and Azure Lake, and also drains the lake. There are several small streams that flow into Clearwater Lake, but it has no significant tributaries.

== Formation ==
The basin occupied by Clearwater Lake was scoured by glaciers during several ice ages, including the Wisconsin Ice Age which ended in this region about 10,000 years ago. The basin subsequently filled with meltwater, but its depth has never been measured reliably. The deepest point is believed to be just east of Diver's Bluff. When Dragon Cone erupted about 8,500 years ago, the lava flowed 15 km (9 mi) southwest to the Clearwater River, damming it to a height of 3 m (10 ft) and raising the level of existing Clearwater Lake just upstream. This flow is just one example of volcanic activity that has occurred in the Wells Gray-Clearwater volcanic field during the last 500,000 years.

Osprey Falls occurs where the Clearwater River empties out of Clearwater Lake. The waterfall is the height of the lava dam, but is over 500 m (1,640 ft) wide along an L-shaped brink. Osprey Falls is very hazardous to boaters on Clearwater Lake because of the strong current in the southern 3 km (1.9 mi). Up to 2020, 20 people had been swept over Osprey Falls and only three survived.

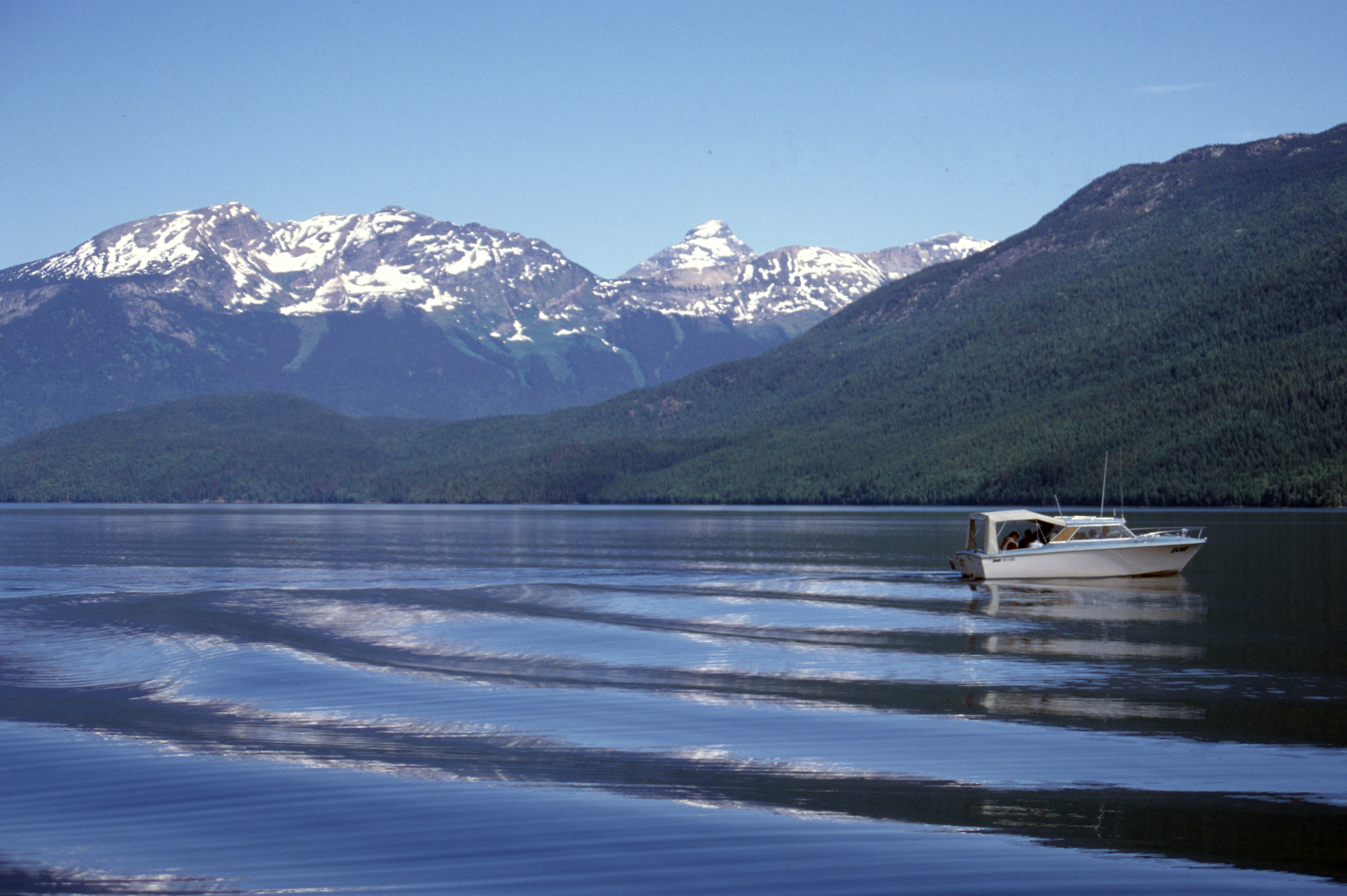
Clearwater Lake with Garnet Peak (center) and Mount Huntley (left)

== Access and trails ==
The Clearwater Valley Road (also called Wells Gray Park Road) ends at Clearwater Lake. Wells Gray Park's largest campgrounds, Clearwater Lake and Falls Creek, are adjacent to Osprey Falls and have 80 sites total. Lake tours and a water taxi service operate from near the campgrounds. The public boat launching ramp is 3 km (1.9 mi) further up the lake.

A trail follows the lakeshore from the water taxi dock to the public boat launch. It continues for 1.5 km (0.9 mi), then climbs away from the lake to a viewpoint above the Easter Bluffs.

At the north end of Clearwater Lake, a portage trail provides access for canoeists and kayakers to nearby Azure Lake. The Hobson Lake trail also starts here and is 13 km (8.1 mi) long; it is a rigorous trail and hikers must ford Lickskillet Creek above Sundt Falls as the bridge washed out in 1998.

Some older maps show a trail to Azure and Zodiac Mountains from the east shore of Clearwater Lake, but this trail is no longer passable.

Seven campgrounds with a few sites at each are located along the east and west shores of Clearwater Lake. The only access is by boat.

== Naming ==
The Overlanders expedition to the Cariboo goldfields rafted down the North Thompson River in 1862. When they arrived at the mouth of the Clearwater River, they noted its distinct clarity compared to the muddy North Thompson and named it Clear Water. The lake was probably seen by white prospectors in 1866 and the river's name was extended to the lake.

== See also ==
- List of lakes of British Columbia
