= Angus Horne Lake =

Lake in British Columbia, Canada

- Location within British Columbia
- Location: British Columbia
- Coordinates: 52°21′00″N 119°46′00″W
- Primary inflows: Angus Horne Creek
- Primary outflows: Angus Horne Creek to Azure Lake
- Basin countries: Canada
- Max. length: 8.1 km (5.0 mi)
- Max. width: 1 km (0.62 mi)
- Surface elevation: 991 m (3,251 ft)
- Islands: None
- Settlements: None

Angus Horne Lake is located in Wells Gray Provincial Park in east-central British Columbia, Canada. It is an expansion of Angus Horne Creek which rises from an unnamed glacier in the Cariboo Mountains. The outflow, also called Angus Horne Creek, flows 11.25 kilometres (6.99 mi) to Azure Lake.

== Naming ==
The lake and creek are named for Angus Horne who was born in Enfield, Nova Scotia, in 1880 and came to the North Thompson Valley in 1912 to work on the Canadian Northern Railway surveys. He was wounded at Vimy Ridge in 1917 and returned to Blue River where he lived for the rest of his life. His log house on the shore of Lake Eleanor, "The Dreamerie", was the showplace of Blue River. Horne maintained an active and strenuous life of prospecting, trapping, lumbering and surveying, and he was always an enthusiastic promoter of the Yellowhead route for the proposed Trans-Canada Highway. From 1936 to 1943, he was postmaster of Blue River. Horne died in January 1948.

Angus Horne Lake and Creek are an exception to the usual Canadian toponymy policy which frowns on using first and last names. Other examples in Wells Gray Park are Mount Hugh Neave and Fred Wells Creek. On some maps, Angus Horne and Fred Wells are spelled as one word, but two is correct.

== Access ==
There is no road or trail to Angus Horne Lake, and helicopters and float planes are not allowed to land, so visitors are extremely rare. The cross-country approach along Angus Horne Creek from Azure Lake is choked with dense undergrowth, Slide Alder and Devil's Club, due to the wet climate in this area.

== See also ==
- List of lakes of British Columbia
