= Hobson Lake =

Lake in British Columbia, Canada

- Location within British Columbia
- Location: British Columbia
- Coordinates: 52°30′00″N 120°20′00″W
- Primary inflows: Clearwater River and Hobson Creek
- Primary outflows: Clearwater River
- Max. length: 35 km (22 mi)
- Max. width: 1.5 km (0.93 mi)
- Surface area: 32.5 km^{2} (12.5 sq mi)
- Average depth: 76.3 m (250 ft)
- Max. depth: 175 m (574 ft)
- Water volume: 2.48 km^{3} (0.59 cu mi)
- Shore length^{1}: 75.7 km (47.0 mi)
- Surface elevation: 858 m (2,815 ft)
- Islands: 1
- Settlements: None
- ^{1} Shore length is not a well-defined measure.

Hobson Lake is the uppermost lake on the Clearwater River in east-central British Columbia, Canada. Hobson Lake is one of the six major lakes in Wells Gray Provincial Park.

Hobson Lake is bordered to the east by peaks of the Cariboo Mountains which rise nearly 2000 m (6500 ft) above the lakeshore. Among these are Mount Hugh Neave and Twin Spires. The former is the seventh-highest mountain in Wells Gray Park at 2,829 m (9,281 ft) and is located due east of Hobson Lake's outlet. Its name recognizes a mountaineer who climbed many peaks in northern Wells Gray Park during the 1960s and 1970s. Hugh Neave made the first ascent of Wells Gray Park's third-highest mountain, Garnet Peak, in 1974. West of Hobson Lake is the Quesnel Highland which has no named mountains near the lake.

== History and naming ==
Hobson Lake is named for John Beaugarde Hobson, a man who did more than any other in British Columbia to demonstrate the value of hydraulic placer mining. With this technique, a bank of gold-bearing gravel was washed into sluices by a powerful jet of water where the gold separated from the gravel. Hobson was born in Ireland in 1844, moved to New York, and studied mining engineering and metallurgy in California. He came to Canada in 1892 at the invitation of the directors of the Canadian Pacific Railway to explore the extensive fields of gold-bearing gravel known to exist in the Cariboo District. He subsequently organized two companies, the Consolidated Cariboo Hydraulic Mining Company on the Quesnel River and the Horsefly Hydraulic Mining Company on the Horsefly River. These were the largest and most modern attempts at hydraulic mining so far known in British Columbia. Unfortunately, because of a lack of funding, neither development prospered. Hobson died in Vancouver in 1912 at the age of 67.

Thomas Drummond was the first prospector to investigate Hobson Creek, one of three streams which flows into the upper end of Hobson Lake. He wrote gloomily:

I built a flume 10 feet by 45 feet and 325 feet long, and put in a dam 10 feet high and 60 feet long, which carried the water of the stream and laid the bed bare. I spent between $4000 and $5000 and the returns were very disappointing on the whole, although I took out a little gold. It is a terrible country for boulders, both large and numerous, of glacial origin, which have simply filled the creek, making it practically impossible to work the bed of the stream or to prospect on the sides. Under such conditions as to remoteness and boulders the creek would have to be exceptionally rich, which it certainly is not, and even after the flume and dam were in it did not pay the expenses of mining.

The Westenhiser Company acquired Drummond's Hobson Creek property soon after and, in the summer of 1914, employed a crew of men to improve the road between Quesnel Lake and Hobson Lake. In 1915, a small steamboat ferried mining equipment to the head of Hobson Lake from where a horse-team packed the supplies 2.5 km (1.6 mi) up the creek to the holdings. The workings consisted of tunnels to test the gravel deposits, flumes, dams and ditchlines, and small-scale attempts at hydraulics, but most of these efforts failed for lack of funds to properly test the gravel. The next owner was the New Cariboo Goldfields Company in 1920 which also found limited prospects on Hobson Creek.

Fred Wells staked some claims in 1923 at the head of a branch of Hobson Creek now called Fred Wells Creek, and was later named the Blue Ice Group. The name aptly described the site, located at an elevation of 2,075 m (6,808 ft), just 60 m (200 ft) away from an active glacier. Although showings of gold and silver were of an economical quantity during the 1938 survey, the site was never fully developed, because of the unpredictable movements of the nearby glacier.

== Access ==
There is no road to Hobson Lake. Modern access is difficult and a visit is a wilderness experience requiring much preparation and survival skills. A trail, 13 km (8 mi) long, starts at the head of Clearwater Lake and ends at the outlet of Hobson Lake. It is usually in poor condition with many deadfalls. A major hazard is fording Lickskillet Creek because 40 m (131 ft) high Sundt Falls is just downstream. Rental canoes are available at Hobson Lake by prior arrangement with Clearwater Lake Tours. This company also provides a water taxi to the trailhead. A second access route is an overgrown trail that connects Quesnel Lake and Hobson Lake, the remains of the old mining tote road. There are no trails from the lakeshore to the alpine meadows and reaching treeline is challenging due to dense undergrowth. The Kamloops Mountaineering Club organized two expeditions in the 1990s to climb Mount Hugh Neave and both turned back due to difficult conditions. Access by air is restricted and a special permit from B.C. Parks is required to land a float plane or helicopter at Hobson Lake.

== See also ==
- List of lakes of British Columbia
