= Baileys Chute =

Waterfalls on Clearwater River in Wells Gray Provincial Park, British Columbia, Canada

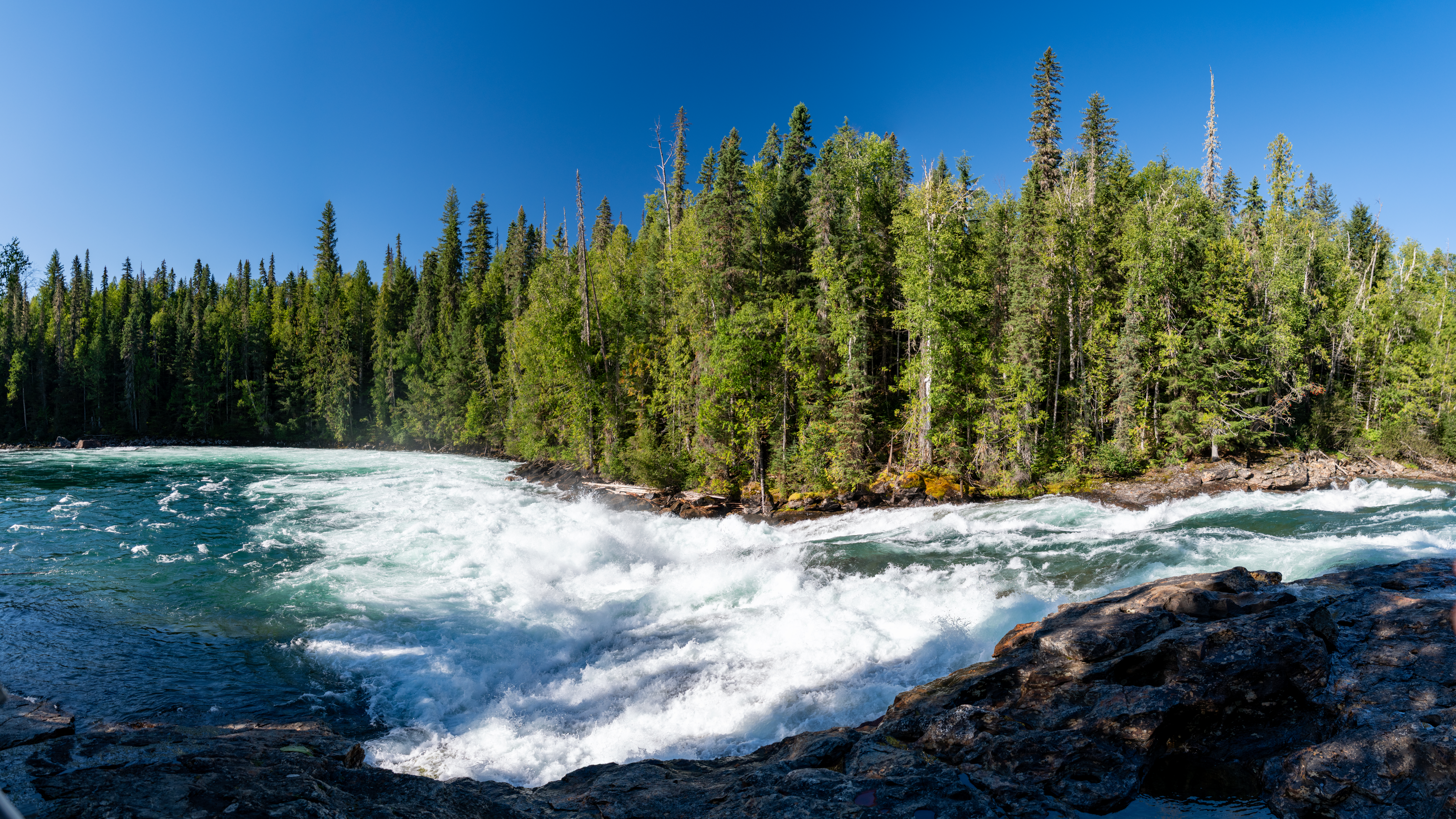
- Baileys Chute
- Interactive map of Baileys Chute
- Location: Wells Gray Provincial Park, British Columbia, Canada
- Coordinates: 52°04′27″N 120°11′58″W
- Type: Gradual sliding cascade
- Total height: 10 m (33 ft)
- Number of drops: 1
- Total width: 46 m (151 ft)
- Watercourse: Clearwater River
- Average flow rate: 122 m^{3}/s (4,300 cu ft/s)

Baileys Chute, often misspelled Bailey's Chute, is one in a series of small waterfalls along the Clearwater River in Wells Gray Provincial Park, British Columbia, Canada. With an average high flow rate of 122 m^{3}/s (4,300 cu ft/s), it is one of the largest waterfalls in British Columbia.

== Name origin ==
Baileys Chute commemorates Jim Bailey, the engineer whose design for a Queen’s Truss bridge across the Murtle River was implemented at The Mushbowl in 1949. While crossing the Clearwater River below the Chute on September 12, 1952, Bailey’s boat capsized in the swift water and he drowned.

== Geology ==
The rock at Baileys Chute is schist and closely related to the ancient Kootenay Terrane found at The Mushbowl, along the base of Green Mountain, and at Trout Creek Canyon (all in Wells Gray Park). The potholes below the platform were carved by pebbles spinning in the water, similar to The Mushbowl potholes. The falls take the form of a gradual sliding cascade. The force of the water impacting the river produces a 1.5-metre-tall (4.9 ft) standing wave that propagates downstream from the falls. This indicates the presence of a significant undercut in the riverbed with an estimated depth of 30 m (98 ft).

== Salmon ==
Baileys Chute is a good place to view the Chinook as they try to leap the falls from mid-August through September. They are the largest of the Pacific salmon, weighing from 8 kg to 22 kg. Most spawn at The Horseshoe further downstream after a life cycle of four to six years.

== Access ==
The trail to Baileys Chute starts at km 57.1 of Clearwater Valley Road (often called the Wells Gray Park road). It is a walk of 10 minutes to the viewing platform beside the Chute. The trail continues to Marcus Falls and Myanth Falls, both also on the Clearwater River.

== See also ==
- List of waterfalls
- List of waterfalls in British Columbia
