= White Horse Bluff =

Volcano in British Columbia, Canada

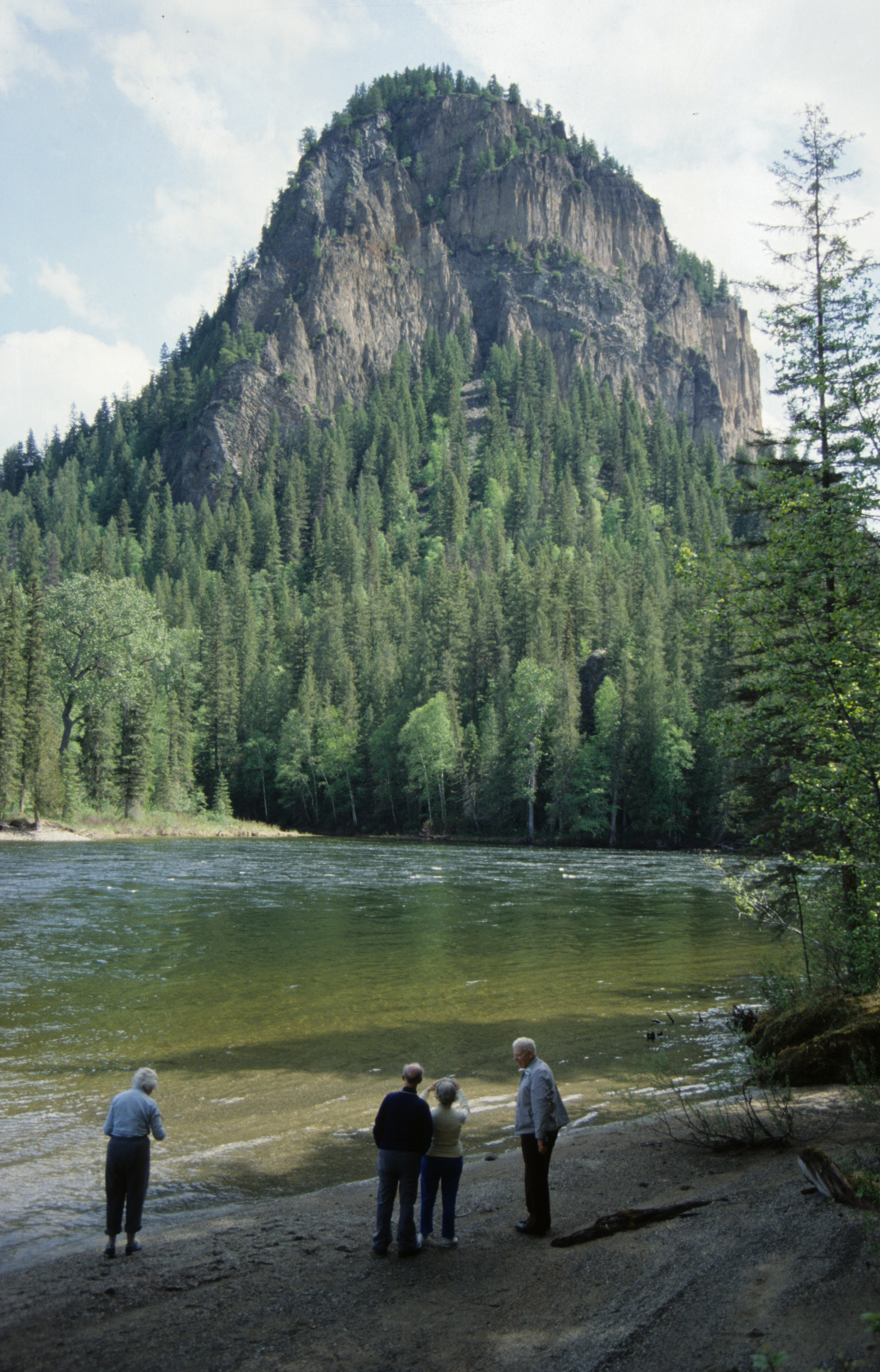
- White Horse Bluff from the Clearwater River

Highest point
- Elevation: 775 m (2,543 ft)
- Coordinates: 51.90°N 120.11°W

Geography
- Location within British Columbia
- Location in Wells Gray Provincial Park
- Location: British Columbia, Canada
- District: Kamloops Division Yale Land District
- Parent range: Shuswap Highland
- Topo map: NTS 92P16 Mahood Lake

Geology
- Rock age: Pleistocene
- Mountain type: Subaqueous volcano
- Volcanic field: Wells Gray-Clearwater volcanic field
- Last eruption: 500,000 years ago

Climbing
- Easiest route: Trail from Green Mountain Road

White Horse Bluff is a subaqueous volcano in Wells Gray Provincial Park, east-central British Columbia, Canada.

== Geology ==
About half a million years ago, the Clearwater Valley was filled by a lake backed up by a lava dam near Hemp Creek. White Horse Bluff is a complex volcanic formation that erupted underneath this lake. The outer lava cooled rapidly as it encountered the lake initiating violent explosions as water percolated into the still-molten interior of the lava. As the debris pile grew, dykes fed more lava to the bluff. Subsequent erosion by glaciers and meltwater has exposed these dykes which give the impression that a giant hand has plastered gobs of lava onto the face.

The Rock Roses are a unique collection of small columns. Unlike most formations of columnar basalt which are vertical, The Rock Roses are horizontal with the ends of the columns pointing out. About 50 m (164 ft) further west, the columns change direction making the long horizontal rows of the columns visible rather than the ends. The Rock Roses were formed by the molten lava in the dyke contacting the cooler and older adjoining rocks.

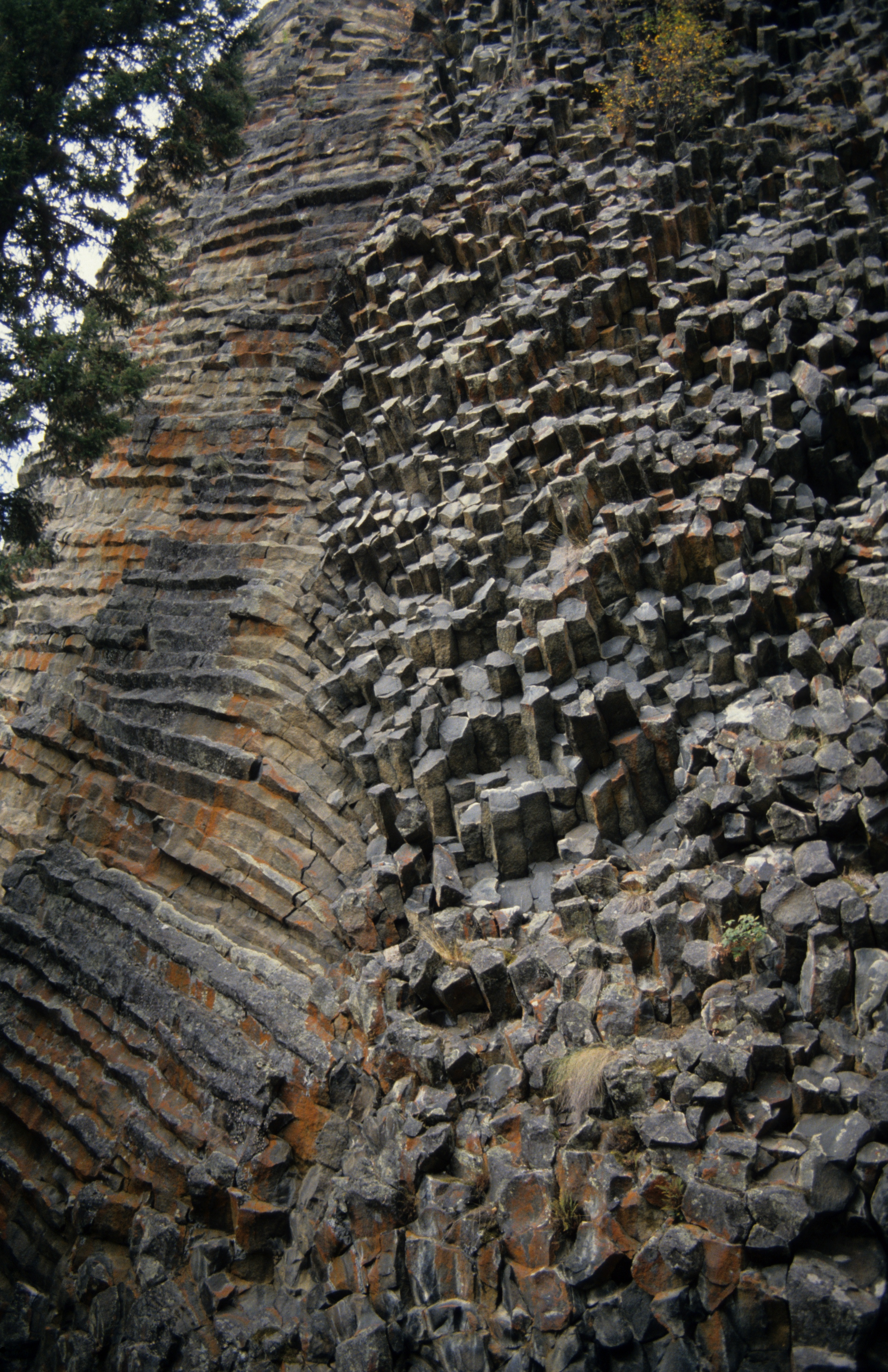
Rock Roses

== Access ==
A trail starts from the Green Mountain Road off the Clearwater Valley Road (also called Wells Gray Park Road). It takes 1.5 hours to hike to the top of White Horse Bluff.

White Horse Bluff can be viewed from the Clearwater River Road on the opposite or west bank of the Clearwater River.

== History ==
The origin of the name, White Horse Bluff, is still debated by Clearwater Valley pioneers, but a First Nations legend about a white horse seems to be the most popular theory. Apparently several horses, including a striking white one, were once pastured beside the Clearwater River near the base of the bluff. In the fall, when the animals were to be moved, the white horse could not be found. In the spring, however, it was found grazing at the top, having somehow climbed up from the river and survived the winter on its own.

Mac and Cecile McDiarmid built one of their Clearwater River fishing camps at the foot of the White Horse Bluff in the late 1940s. It was nicknamed "The Longhouse" because it was 12 m (39 ft) long and 5 m (16 ft) wide. Only the ruins are left today. Eventually, the McDiarmids operated four cabins or fishing camps along the river and their home base on the Clearwater Valley Road was called Trophies Lodge. Hundreds of guests enjoyed wilderness vacations and the Clearwater's fabulous fishing over a 25-year period starting in 1945. About 1950, a guest at The Longhouse detected a cold draft blowing outward from some cracks near the base of the White Horse Bluff. The McDiarmids excavated a cavity about a meter deep and almost high enough for a standing person. This natural refrigerator kept ice solid even on the hottest of summer days and was a luxury in this remote place. It is still there today and, in September 2014, the temperature at the entrance was measured at 5 degrees Celsius.

== See also ==
- Wells Gray-Clearwater volcanic field
- List of volcanoes in Canada
- Volcanism of Western Canada
