= Mount Pierrway =

Mountain in British Columbia, Canada

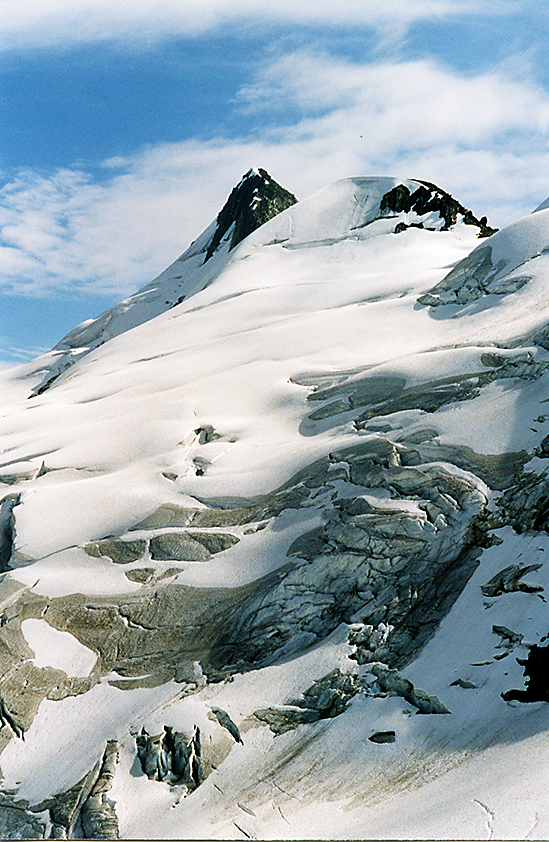
- Mount Pierrway from the north

Highest point
- Elevation: 2,854 m (9,364 ft)
- Listing: Mountains of British Columbia
- Coordinates: 52°52′N 120°08′W

Geography
- Location within British Columbia
- Interactive map of Mount Pierrway
- Location: British Columbia, Canada
- District: Cariboo Land District
- Parent range: Cariboo Mountains
- Topo map: NTS 93A16 Mount Winder or PS-WG3 (north half)

Geology
- Mountain type: Pyramidal peak

Climbing
- First ascent: August 13, 1969

Mount Pierrway is a mountain in east-central British Columbia, Canada, located near the headwaters of the Clearwater River. Situated in the Cariboo Mountains, part of the Columbia Mountains, it is the fifth-highest mountain in Wells Gray Provincial Park with an elevation of 2,854 m (9,364 ft). Mount Pierrway lies on the boundary between Wells Gray Provincial Park and Cariboo Mountains Provincial Park.

Mount Pierrway was first climbed on August 13, 1969 by Art Maki and Art Wilder, "from camp east of the Park boundary, via East Pierrway Glacier, up highly crevassed glacier to col, then climbed north summit and followed ridge to the extreme south end which is the highest summit." The second ascent was achieved on May 19, 1987 by a British Columbia Mountaineering Club ski party consisting of Brian Gavin, Malcolm MacFadyen, Colin Oloman, Mary Prendergast, Brian Thompson, Gavin Thurston, and Ross Wyborn. The third ascent was by Bill McKenzie and Roger Wallis from the Alpine Club of Canada, on August 17, 2005.

Mount Pierrway was named in 1966 in honor of Canadian Army Private Alfred Pierrway, K 601413, from Quesnel, British Columbia. He was serving as a gunner with the Royal Canadian Artillery when he was killed in action on July 12, 1942, at age 22. Five other neighbouring peaks were named at the same time for Canadian soldiers from the Quesnel area who were killed during World War II: Mount Goodall, Mount Winder, Mount Beaman, Mount Hogg, and Mount Aves.

Mount Lyons, Wells Gray Park's highest mountain, is 4.9 km (3.0 mi) west of Mount Pierrway, elevation 2,946 m (9,665 ft). The Park's highest unclimbed mountain is 3.7 km (2.3 mi) WSW of Pierrway, elevation 2,847 m (9,341 ft), and is unnamed.
