= Clearwater River (British Columbia) =

River in British Columbia, Canada

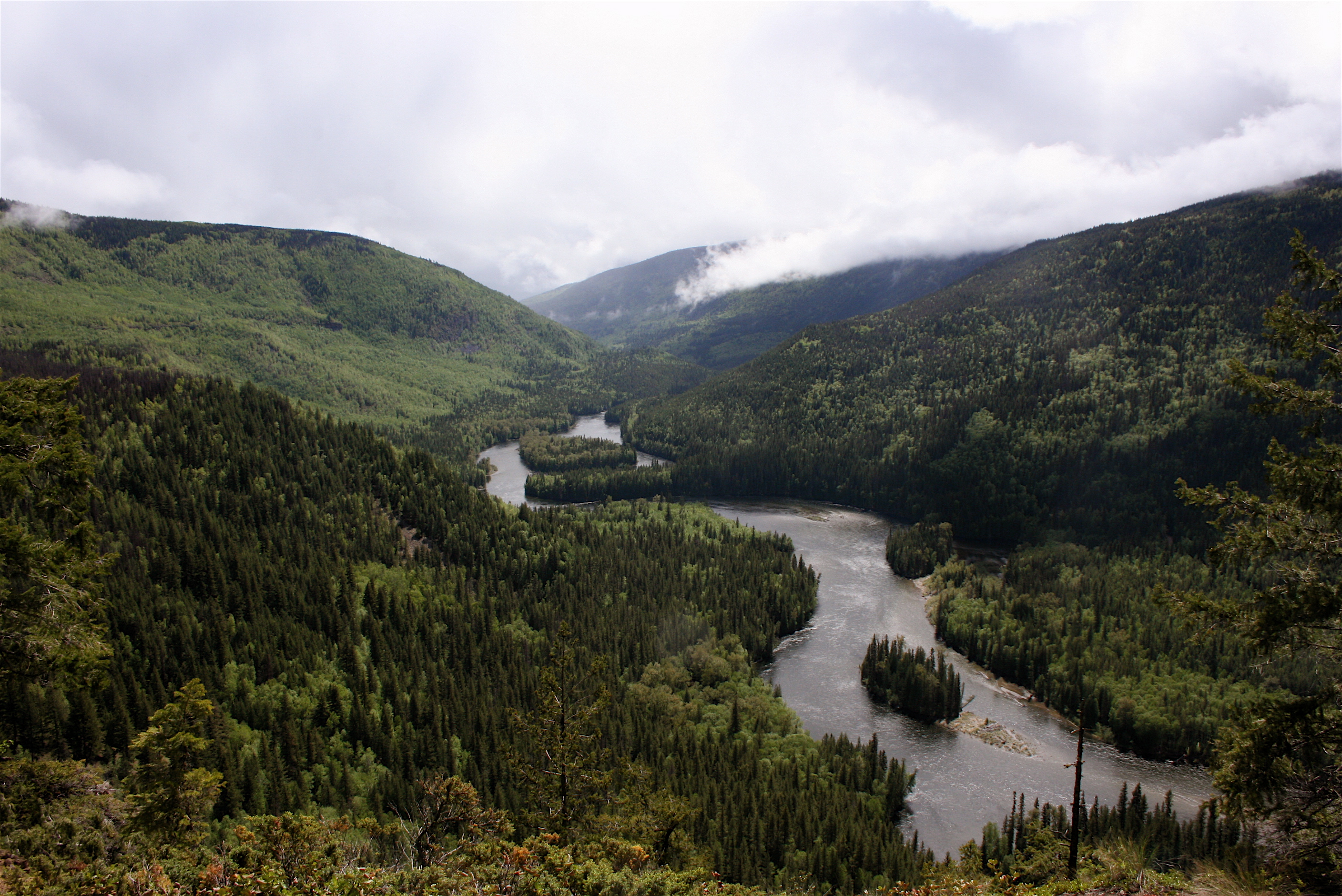
- Clearwater River viewed from White Horse Bluff

Location
- Country: Canada
- Province: British Columbia
- Land District: Kamloops Division Yale

Physical characteristics
- Source: Cariboo Mountains
  - coordinates: 52°49′N 120°6′W
  - elevation: 1,356 m (4,449 ft)
- Mouth: North Thompson River
  - coordinates: 51°37′59″N 120°4′50″W
  - elevation: 392 m (1,286 ft)
- Length: 201 km (125 mi)
- Basin size: 10,200 km^{2} (3,900 sq mi)
- Discharge
  - location: mouth
  - average: 223 m^{3}/s (7,900 cu ft/s)

Basin features
- Waterfalls: Baileys Chute, Marcus Falls, Myanth Falls, Osprey Falls

The Clearwater River is the largest tributary of the North Thompson River, joining it at the community of Clearwater, British Columbia. The Clearwater rises from glaciers in the Cariboo Mountains and flows in a mostly southerly direction for 201 km (125 mi) to the North Thompson. Its entire course, except the last 5 km (3 mi), is within Wells Gray Provincial Park. Its confluence with the North Thompson is protected by North Thompson River Provincial Park.

There are two large lakes on the Clearwater River. Hobson Lake is 35 km (22 mi) long and averages 1.5 km (0.9 mi) wide. Clearwater Lake is 24 km (15 mi) long and averages 2 km (1.2 mi) wide. The Clearwater's largest tributaries are (from source to mouth) Hobson Creek, Goat Creek, Lickskillet Creek, Azure River, Falls Creek, Murtle River, Mahood River, Hemp Creek, Grouse Creek, and Spahats Creek.

The river is popular for fly fishing, whitewater kayaking, whitewater rafting, hiking, and wildlife viewing.

== History and naming ==
=== Overlanders ===
The Overlanders expedition to the Cariboo goldfields rafted down the North Thompson River in 1862. When they arrived at the mouth of the Clearwater River, they noted its distinct clarity compared to the muddy North Thompson and named it Clear Water. In 1863, the first tourists, Lord Milton and Dr. Cheadle, traveled through the North Thompson Valley and solidified the Clearwater River name by publishing it in their journal, The Northwest Passage by Land (London, 1865).

The Clearwater River starts as a typical silt-laden glacial stream, then flows into Hobson Lake which acts as a huge settling basin for the glacial material. Clearwater Lake downstream continues the silt removing process. Three major tributaries all have large lakes on them as well: Azure River with Azure Lake, Murtle River with Murtle Lake, and Mahood River with Canim Lake and Mahood Lake. The North Thompson River, by contrast, has no lakes on it so silt from the Thompson Glacier at its origin as well as its glacial tributaries is carried the whole length of the river. The Overlanders bestowed only two place names during their perilous journey on the North Thompson River: Clear Water River and Raft Peak above the town of Clearwater.

=== Prospecting and mining ===
On August 20, 1866, the B.C. Tribune, published in Yale, reported: "...a party of prospectors which went up the Clear Water River about fifty miles, early this season, discovered a quartz ledge on a tributary of it which appears to be very rich in silver." The Cariboo Sentinel of Barkerville commented on October 13, 1869: "About forty Chinamen are working the bench by shooting the gravel down to the Clearwater River, and are making from $4 to $9 a day. With proper water works this bench would yield a large amount of gold, and its extent offers employment to hundreds of miners." Neither of these reports suggests the specific location of the activities on the Clearwater River and, as mileage calculated in those days was generally inaccurate, the figure given by the B.C. Tribune is practically meaningless. Later reports about hydraulic mining, however, indicate that the Chinese miners were probably working upstream from Hobson Lake.

The spark that ignited a flurry of prospecting and mining activity along the Clearwater River was probably provided by H.R. Bellamy of Nelson in 1899: "I believe that all the streams from the west, flowing into the North Thompson River have brought down more or less gold, especially the Clearwater...This river has no doubt brought down vast quantities of gold and deposited it along the bed of the Thompson..."

By the 1920s, much of Hobson Creek and the Clearwater River above Hobson Lake had been staked and active mining or hydraulicking was underway. The Blue Ice Mine on Fred Wells Creek, a branch of Hobson Creek, was a unique endeavour. The name aptly described the site, located at an altitude of 2,075 m (6,808 ft), just 60 m (197 ft) away from an active glacier. Although showings of gold and silver were of an economical quantity during a 1938 survey, the site was never fully developed, because of the unpredictable movements of the nearby glacier.

=== Canadian Pacific Railway ===
Between 1872 and 1881, about 20 survey parties fanned out across British Columbia trying to find the best route for the new railway between Yellowhead Pass in the Rocky Mountains and the Pacific Coast. Three survey parties visited what is now Wells Gray Park. In 1873, Marcus Smith, searching for the ideal route to Bute Inlet, visited Hobson Lake and wrote in his diary: "The Clearwater River rises in a range of mountains to the northeast of Quesnelle Lake, and nearly due east of the latter it expands into a lake, which can be reached by a pass...said to be easy and not very high. There is the short space between Clearwater lake and the north fork of the North Thompson River, about which I can get no information....This is undoubtedly part of the Selkirk Range, and I have no expectation that a railway line could be got through it without a tunnel of considerable length, but this route would shorten the line so much that it is well worth consideration."

In 1874, the railway dispatched a survey party to explore the headwaters of the Clearwater River, under the leadership of E.W. Jarvis. The altitude of the pass was calculated at 2,130 m (6,988 ft) (actually only 1,800 m (5,906 ft)) and the route skirted an immense glacier before descending to the Raush River, a tributary of the Fraser River — "clearly impracticable for a railway line". When the more southern Kicking Horse Pass was chosen instead in 1881, all the meticulously examined routes in the Clearwater River basin were abandoned. Only three place names in Wells Gray Park recognize those 10 wasted years of surveys: Murtle River & Lake, Mahood River & Lake, and Marcus Falls.

=== Settlement ===
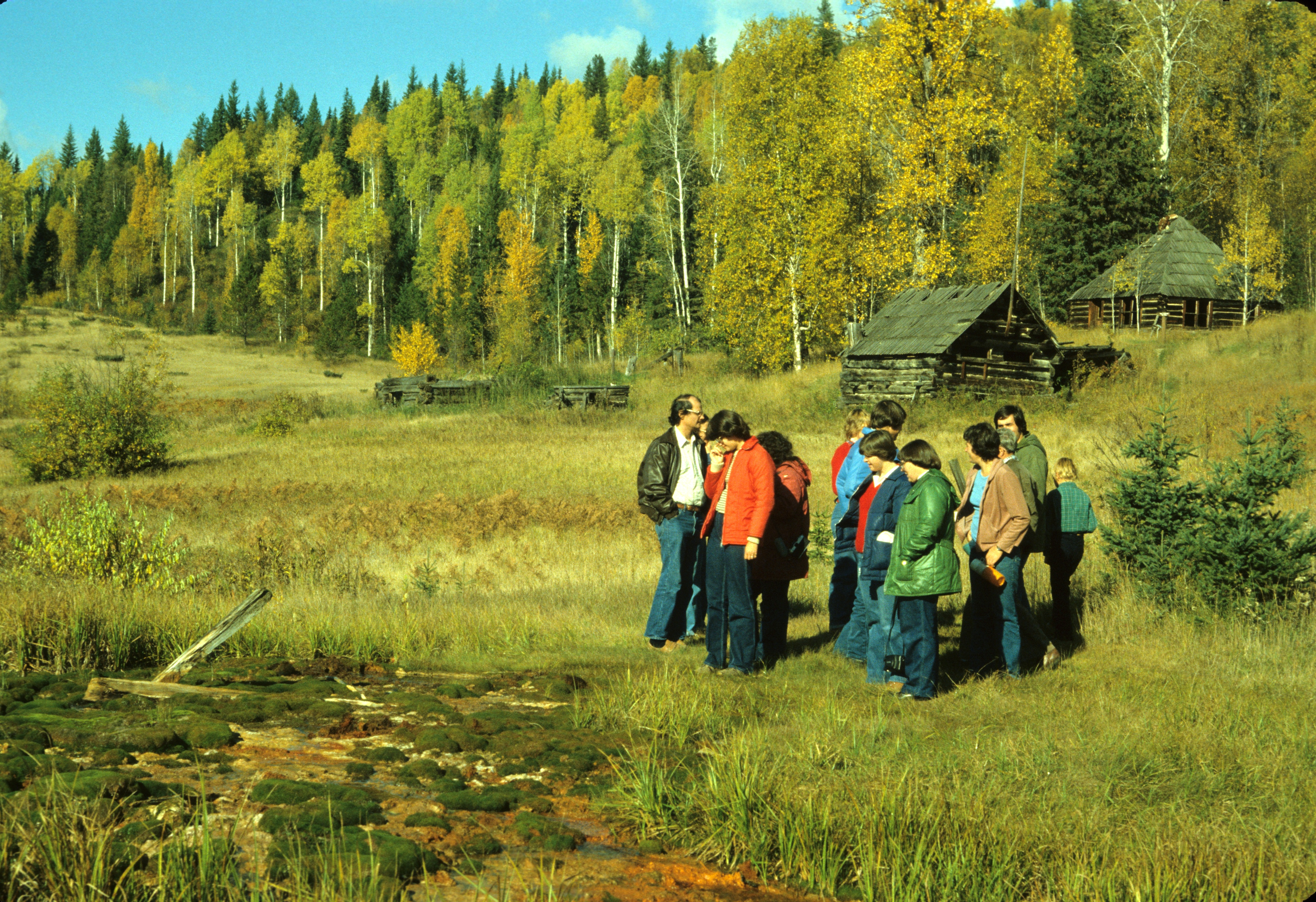
Ray Farm in 1971. Mineral Springs in front.

No homesteads were ever established beside the Clearwater River because there was no arable land. The closest one belonged to John Ray who arrived in 1911 and settled about 55 km (34 mi) up the Clearwater Valley from the North Thompson River. His nearest neighbour, Michael Majerus, was 16 km (10 mi) away. Ray cleared land and became nearly self-sufficient, making trips west to 100 Mile House only once or twice a year to pick up some supplies and trade his furs. He lived alone until 1932, then, at the age of 54, he married Alice Ludtke, age 20. They raised three children on this remote homestead. In 1946, they decided to move to Clearwater so the children could be educated in a school. It took many trips to move homes and John did not return from his last one in December 1947. Some friends trekked into the remote farm and found that John had died of a heart attack there. Today, the Ray Farm buildings are deteriorating and the house has collapsed. B.C. Parks has no funds for restoration, but the trail is in good condition and some interpretive signage has been installed.

== Geography ==
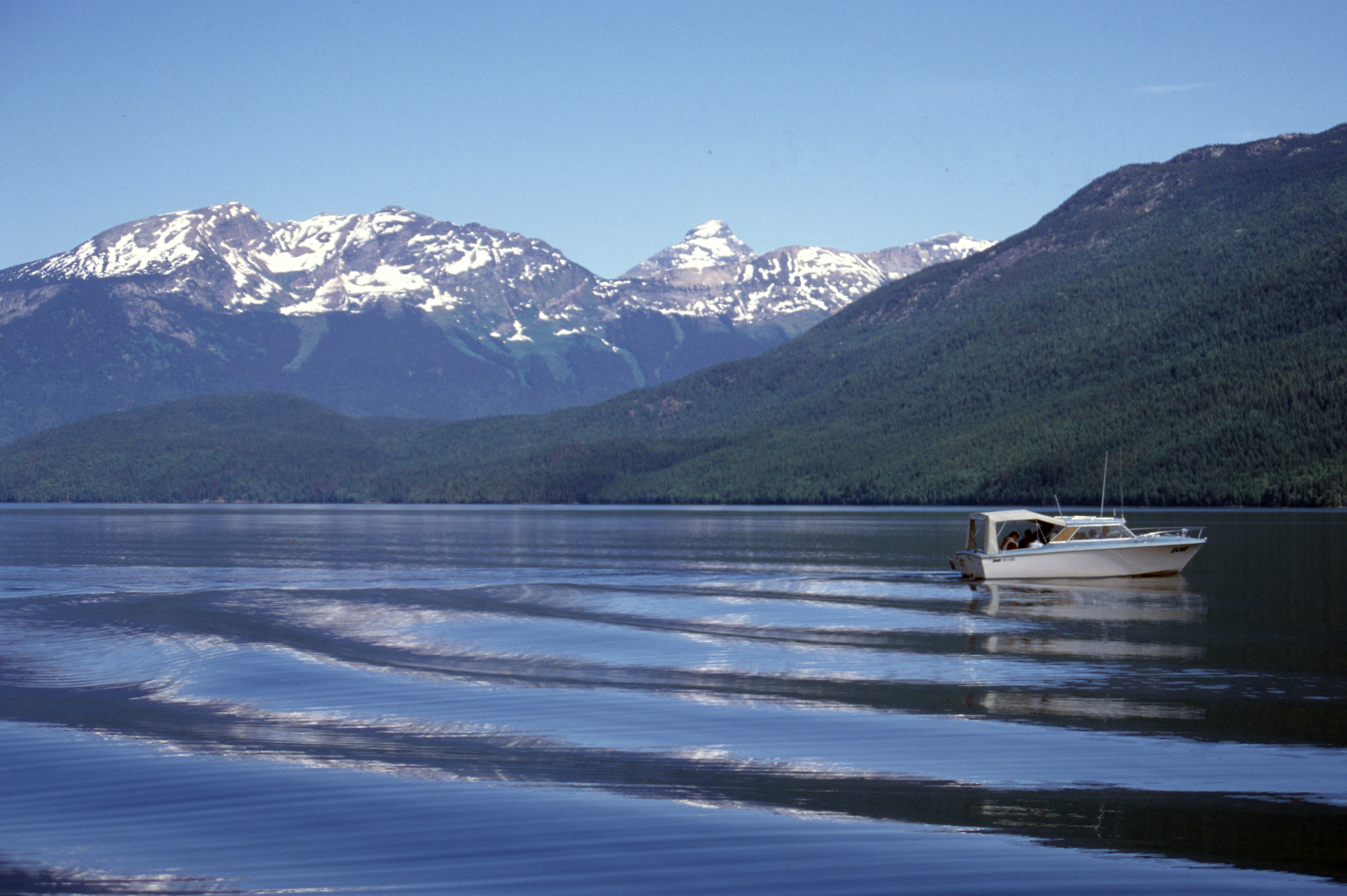
Clearwater Lake. Peaks are (L-R) Huntley, Garnet and Tryfan.

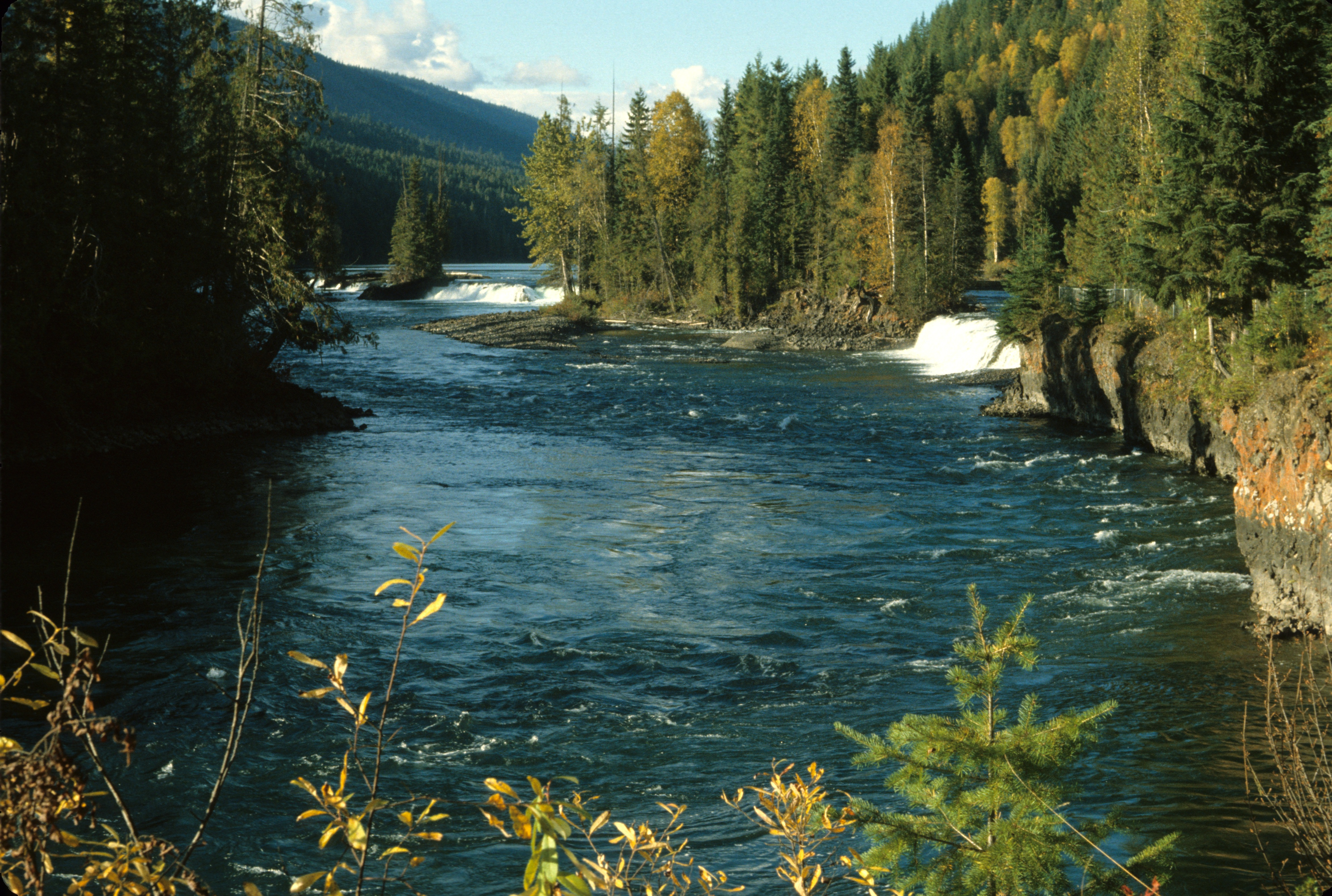
Clearwater River and Osprey Falls at outlet of Clearwater Lake

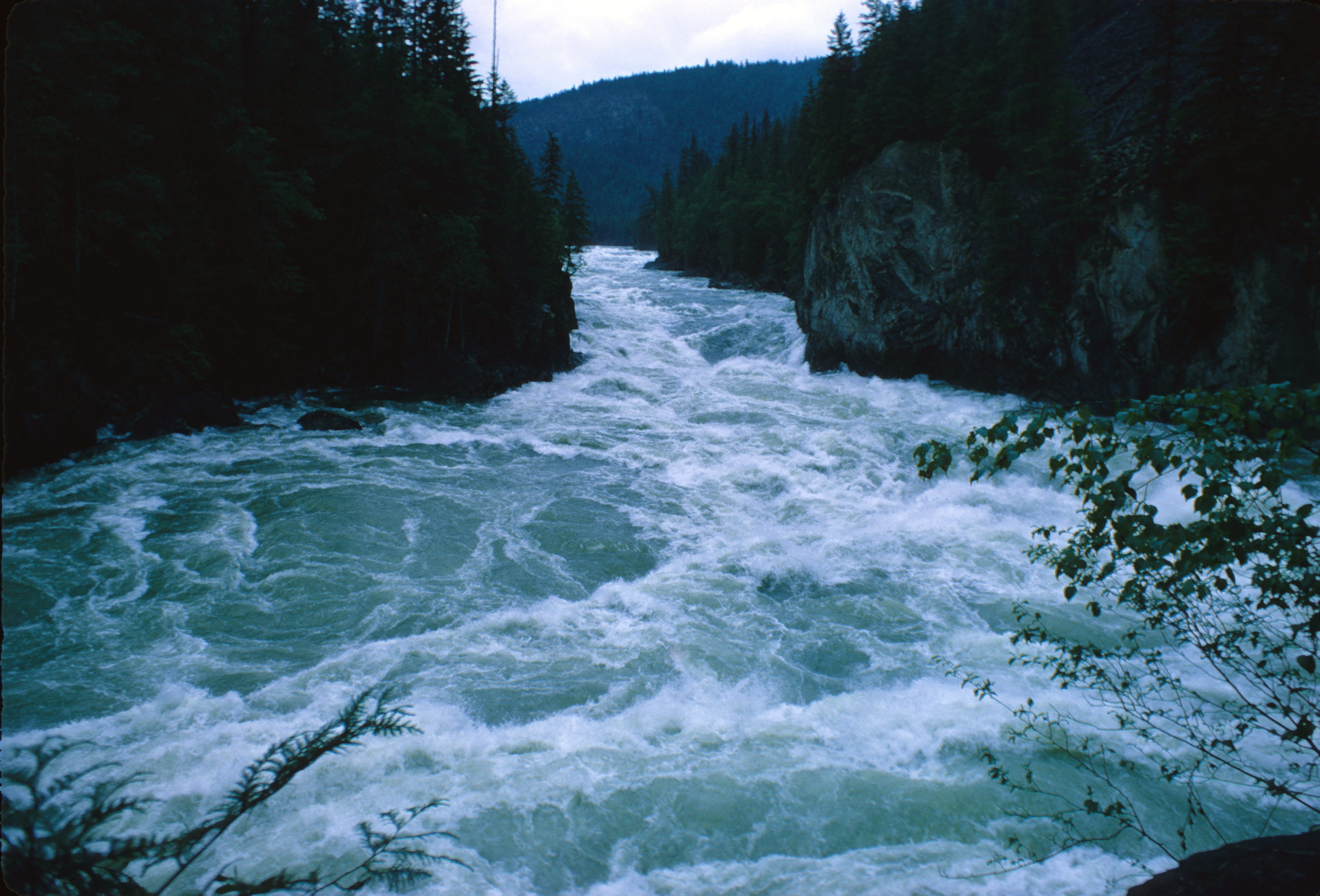
The Kettle in Granite Canyon

The first half of the Clearwater River's course is among the peaks of the Cariboo Mountains and deep, glacially-carved valleys are typical. The source of the Clearwater is near the northern boundary of Wells Gray Park. The river pours out of an unnamed glacier, surrounded by peaks such as Mount Goodall, the Park's second highest at 2,930 m (9,613 ft); Mount Pierrway, #5 at 2,854 m (9,364 ft); Mount Winder, #9 at 2,767 m (9,078 ft); Mount Beaman, Mount Hogg and Mount Aves. All six were named in 1966 in honour of Canadian soldiers from the Quesnel area killed in action during World War II. The first 30 km (19 mi) of the Clearwater is through a broad U-shaped glacial valley before it enters Hobson Lake. Mountains along the east shore of Hobson Lake include Twin Spires; Mount Hugh Neave, seventh highest in the Park at 2,829 m (9,281 ft); and Garnet Peak, third highest at 2,876 m (9,436 ft). Below Hobson Lake, the Clearwater drops over a series of low waterfalls and many rapids, descending 178 m (584 ft) in the next 12 km (7 mi). At the inflow of the Azure River from the east, the Clearwater becomes navigable. Then it sweeps through two 90-degree bends in the next 2.9 km (1.8 mi) and enters Clearwater Lake. East of Clearwater Lake are Zodiac Mountain, Azure Mountain and Mount Ray, the last being a volcano that erupted about 20,000 years ago.

The second half of the Clearwater River is mainly influenced by volcanic activity, so lava plateaus and lava cliffs hem the river. Clearwater Lake was dammed by lava from an eruption called Dragon's Tongue about 8,500 years ago. Today, the river drops directly out of Clearwater Lake over 3 m (10 ft) high Osprey Falls which creates hazardous boating conditions at the lake's outlet. For the next 65 km (40 mi), the Clearwater races through one rapid after another and over three more waterfalls, Myanth Falls, Marcus Falls and Baileys Chute. Some of the more dramatic white-water sections are Gatling Gorge, Helmcken Canyon, Sabre Tooth Rapids, Batholith Rapids, The Kettle, and Granite Canyon. The only extended section of calm water is called The Horseshoe, a 5 km (3 mi) long meander where the river almost inscribes a complete circle. Three mountains rise east of the Clearwater River: Battle Mountain, Trophy Mountain and Raft Mountain.

== Access ==
Clearwater Valley Road (commonly called Wells Gray Park Road) starts at the Yellowhead Highway in Clearwater and extends north along the east side of the Clearwater Valley for 68 km (42 mi) to Clearwater Lake. Almost all Wells Gray Park's tourists drive this road as the major attractions such as Spahats Falls, Trophy Mountain, Helmcken Falls and Clearwater Lake are reached by this route. However, during the first 49 km (30 mi) this road is either high above the Clearwater River or at least 4 km (2.5 mi) east of it, so river access is only by hiking trails. This road is paved to Helmcken Falls, then gravel in good condition for the remaining distance to Clearwater Lake.

Trails to the river from Clearwater Valley Road (distances from Yellowhead Highway)

- km 4.3 - Triple Decker Falls
- km 10.2 - Bottom of Spahats Falls (the footbridge in Spahats Canyon is washed out and unlikely to be repaired)
- km 13.2 - First Canyon
- km 17.1 - Canyon Creeks
- The above 4 trails all connect with the Clearwater River Trail which follows the east side of the river.
- km 20.7 - Moul Falls (trail continues to the river through private property and permission should be obtained from Wells Gray Tours)
- km 29.4 - Flatiron and Hemp Canyonlands
- km 36.2 - Green Mountain and White Horse Bluff
- km 42.5 - Helmcken Falls side road, then trail to Gatling Gorge or scrambling route into Helmcken Canyon
- km 52.5 - The Horseshoe
- km 57.1 - Baileys Chute, Marcus Falls and Myanth Falls
- km 64.2 - Norman's Eddy

Clearwater River Road starts in Clearwater and extends north along the west bank of the Clearwater River for 38 km (23.6 mi) to the confluence with the Mahood River. This road is seldom out of sight of the Clearwater River and can even be closed in May or June due to high water. This road is usually maintained by its users and is rough and slow. A high clearance vehicle is recommended. The Kettle, a major rapid, is reached by an unsigned trail at km 8.0. Sabre Tooth Rapids are below the road at km 21.1. Another unsigned trail starts at km 32.6 and leads to a beach on the river with White Horse Bluff opposite. At the end of the road, a trail leads to Sylvia Falls, 3.5 km up the Mahood River.

2023 update - A major washout in July 2020 has closed the Clearwater River Road at km 11.4. The rest of the road to the Mahood River is accessible by mountain bike or on foot. BC Parks is assessing the repairs and the cost is well over $1 million. The road will remain closed to vehicles for the foreseeable future.

== Fishing ==
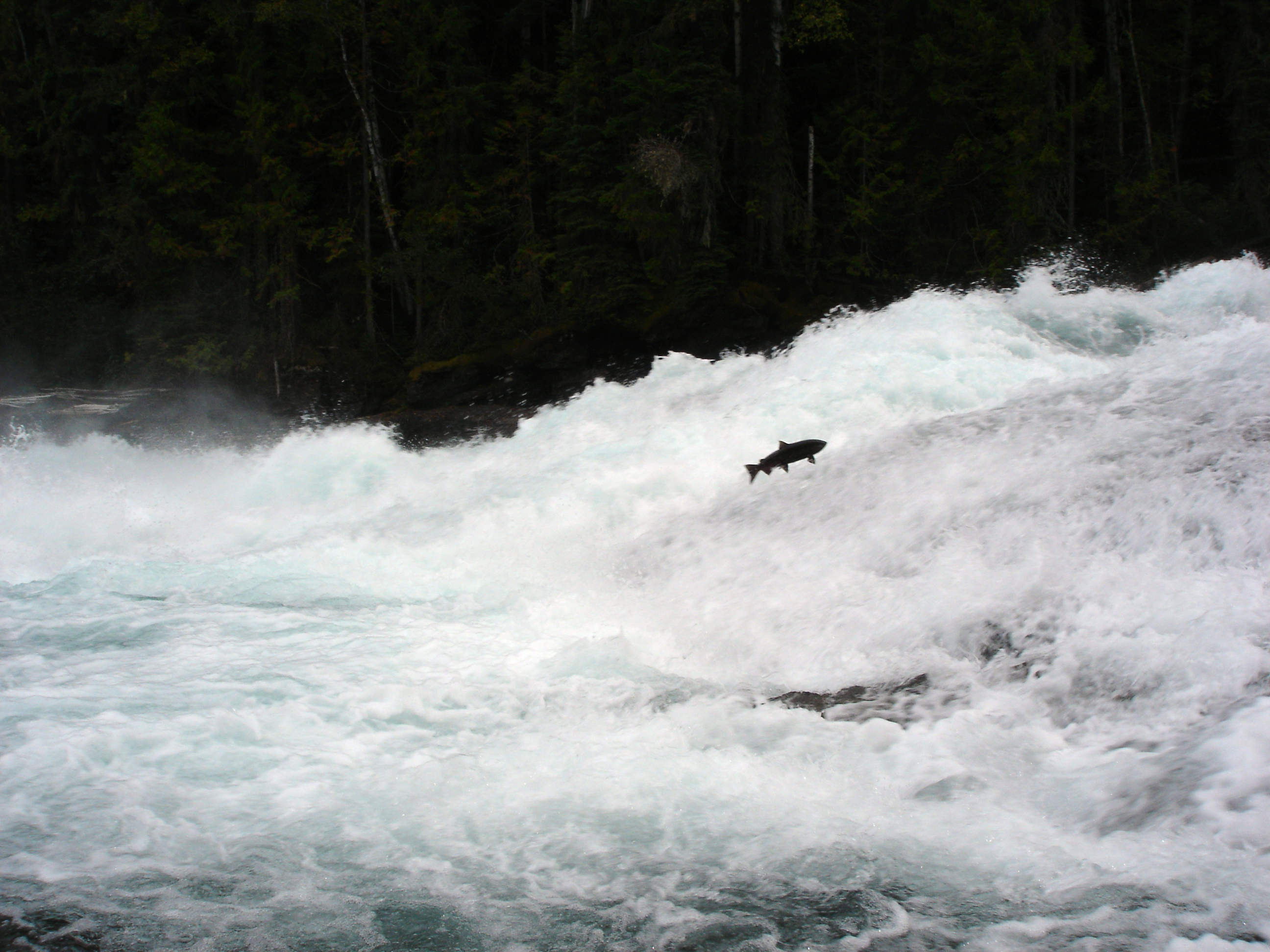
Salmon trying to jump Baileys Chute

The Clearwater River supports Kokanee, Chinook salmon, Coho salmon, Sockeye salmon, Rainbow trout, Dolly varden and Mountain white fish. Several thousand Chinook, 200 Sockeye and 500 Coho spawn in the river.

Baileys Chute is a good place to view the Chinook as they try to leap the falls from mid-August through September. They are the largest of the Pacific salmon, weighing from 8 kg to 22 kg. Most spawn near The Horseshoe after a life cycle of four to six years.

The Clearwater River was famous for its fabulous fishing starting in the 1940s. The McDiarmid family built four fishing camps along the east bank between Grouse Creek and the Mahood River. In 1950, they started construction of Trophies Lodge, named for the fish, as headquarters for this operation. During the 1950s and 1960s, they hosted many anglers who came from around the world to experience the Clearwater. The guestbook for Trophies Lodge contains distinguished names such as Vanderbilts, DuPonts, H.R. MacMillan (who came twice a year), and even semi-royalty in the person of Wallis Simpson. According to Mac McDiarmid, the proprietor, fish up to four pounds were always thrown back. After the Clearwater River Road was built along the west bank, the river became easily accessible and was quickly fished out. The McDiarmids closed Trophies Lodge and their fishing camps in 1970.

The Clearwater River remained almost devoid of fish for the next 30 years. An assessment in 1992 showed that the river downstream from the Mahood confluence had far fewer fish than upstream, proving the serious effect of the Clearwater River Road. In 1994, new regulations came into effect which called for catch and release, a bait ban, a single barbless hook, and no fishing prior to July 15 each year. Another 10 years passed before the fishing improved and the regulations were relaxed a little around 2015. These rules apply only to the Clearwater River downstream from Clearwater Lake.

== Boating ==
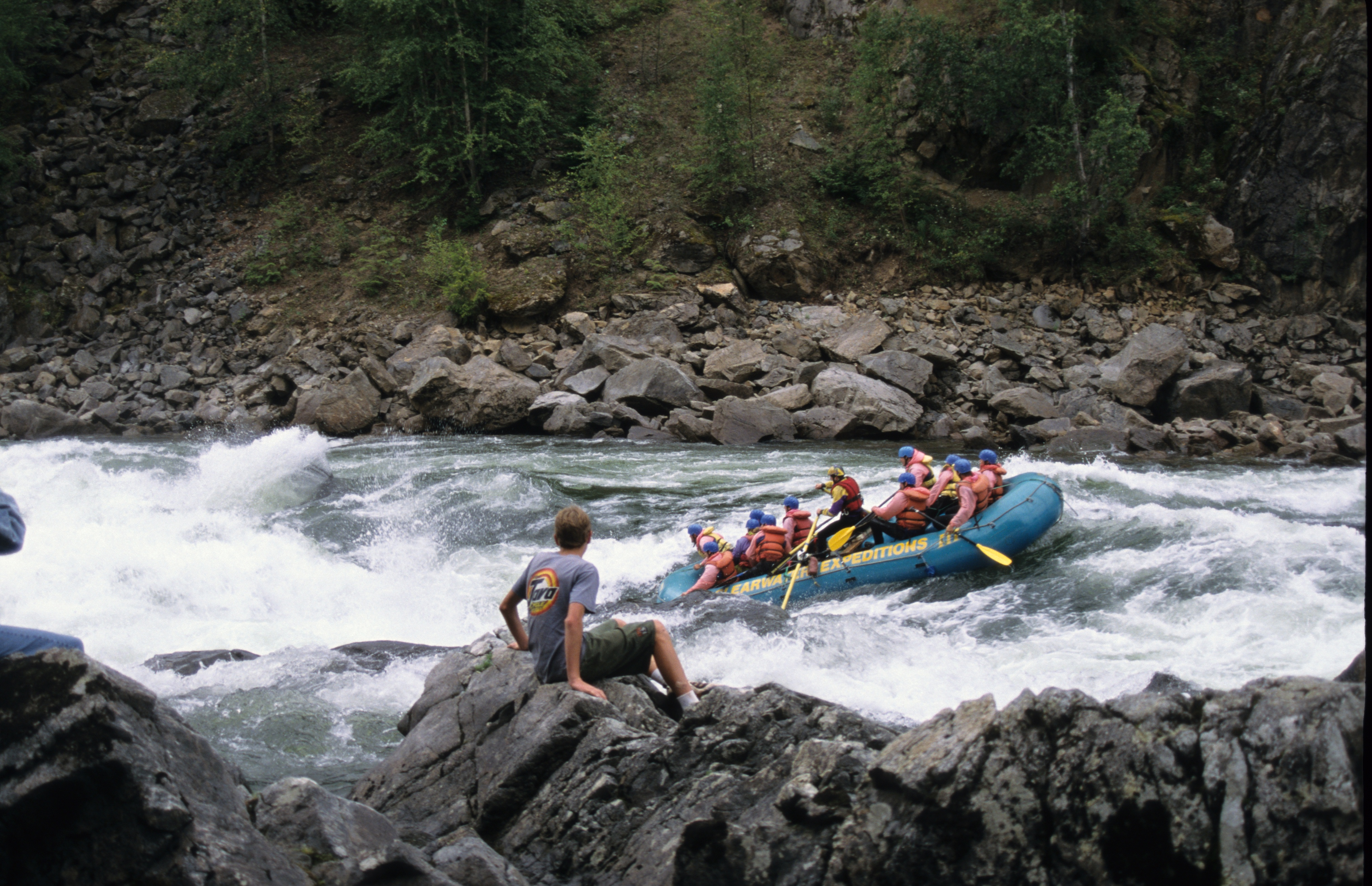
Interior Whitewater Expeditions raft in Sabre Tooth Rapids

Whitewater rafting is offered by three companies, all operating in Granite Canyon since the Clearwater River Road washout in 2020 has prevented access to the river further upstream. Interior Whitewater Expeditions has been on the river for over 25 years. Other companies are Liquid Lifestyles and Riverside Adventures.

Kayaking requires expert skills for many sections of the river. Kayakers who are unfamiliar with the river should try it first at low to medium flows in July, August and September. The Clearwater River Road provides access to 11 km (7 mi) of the river. The 8 km (5 mi) run through Granite Canyon is the most exciting section. Only a few expert kayakers have gone through The Kettle, rated at 6+. Many parts of the Clearwater River between Clearwater Lake and Deer Creek, a river distance of 17 km (11 mi), are accessible from the Clearwater Valley Road. Marcus Falls and Baileys Chute require a portage and Myanth Falls is rated as 4+. The Horseshoe is the longest stretch of calm water on the entire Clearwater River. Taking out at Deer Creek is critical because downstream is the start of 10 km (6 mi) of rapids, culminating in Gatling Gorge and Helmcken Canyon.

Canoeing. The only safe section for canoeists downstream from Clearwater Lake is around The Horseshoe meander bend. There is a put-in at Alice Creek and a take-out at Deer Creek, both on the Clearwater Valley Road. The Clearwater River between Azure Lake and the upper end of Clearwater Lake is safe for a canoeist to go downstream, but the current is too strong to go upstream and a portage trail is available.

== Oddities ==
- Many rivers that have meanders have several of them. The Clearwater River has only one meander, called The Horseshoe. See 'Geography' section above.
- Every major tributary to the Clearwater River has a waterfall on it. Falls Creek Falls even drops directly into the Clearwater River.
- 97% of the Clearwater River shoreline is protected by Wells Gray Provincial Park.
- There are only two private properties on the Clearwater River within Wells Gray Park. One was owned by industrialist H.R. MacMillan and was his private fishing retreat starting in 1934. He donated the property and cabin to Westminster Abbey, east of Vancouver, in 1972. The other property is owned by the Neave family. The properties consist of about 70 acres each.

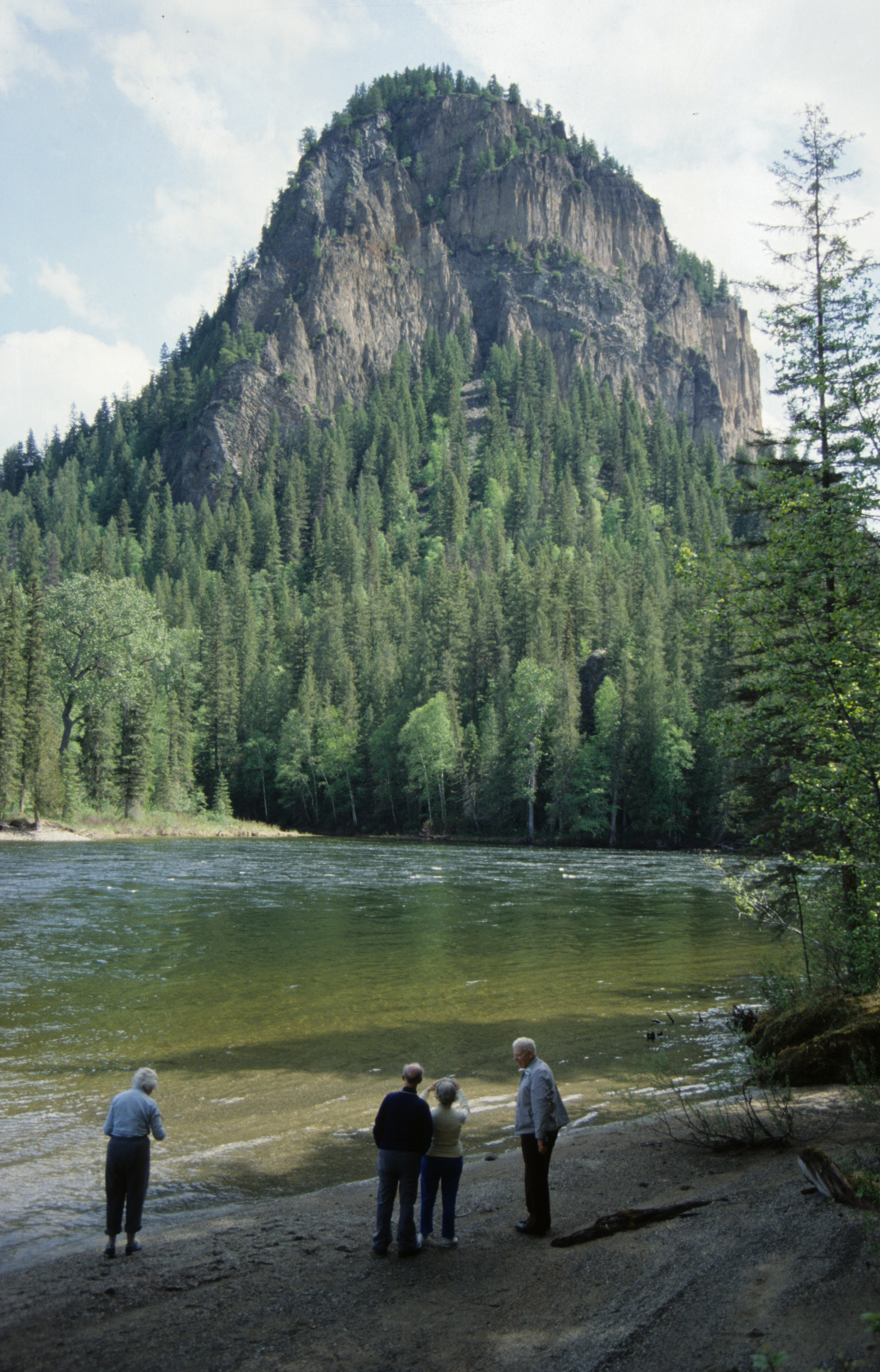
White Horse Bluff

- White Horse Bluff rises 200 m (656 ft) vertically from the east bank of the Clearwater River about 32.5 km (20.2 mi) north of Clearwater. The south side of the cliffs has a rare volcanic formation called the Rock Roses. Unlike most formations of columnar basalt which are like organ pipes, these are horizontal and the ends of the columns point out, rather like the tiles on a shower wall. Further west, the columns suddenly change direction and resemble the wall of a log house.
- Beside the Clearwater River at the base of White Horse Bluff, there is a natural refrigerator. The McDiarmid family operated four fishing camps along the river from 1944 to 1970. One summer, they noticed a cold draft of air blowing outward from some cracks here. They enlarged it, built some walls and were able to keep ice solid and perishable foods cold even in the summer heat, truly a luxury in the wilderness. The refrigerator is still there today (although partly fallen in) and, when measured by this writer in 2014, was 2 degrees Celsius inside.
- There is an abandoned donkey engine in the forest near the west bank of the Clearwater River at Marcus Falls. It can be seen from the viewpoint in late fall when leaves are off the trees, but otherwise it is not accessible. It was moved here in the winter of 1912-13 when the Canadian Northern Railway was being planned and some loggers figured they could get the contract for the Clearwater River bridge at Baileys Chute if they had a donkey on site. The 10-ton machine was skidded over the ice of Canim Lake, rafted along Mahood Lake in the spring, then winched to this location. The men had already cut 9000 cubic meters of timber when the railway was confirmed along a different route.

== See also ==
- List of tributaries of the Fraser River
- List of rivers of British Columbia
