= Subaqueous volcano =

Type of volcano

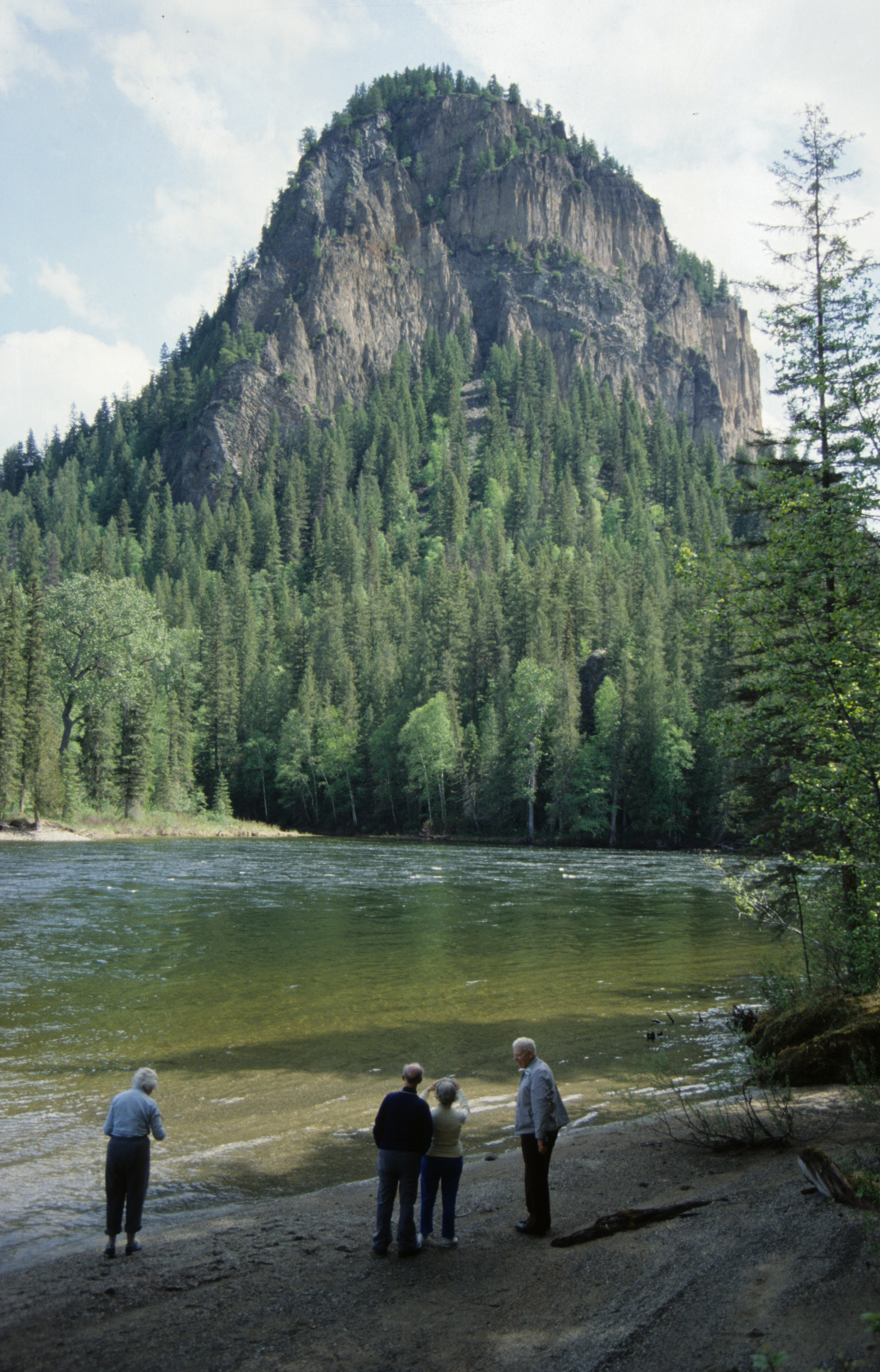
White Horse Bluff

A subaqueous volcano is a volcano formed from the eruption or flow of magma that occurs under water (as opposed to a subaerial volcanic eruption). Subaqueous volcanic eruptions are significantly more abundant than subaerial eruptions and are estimated to be responsible for 85% of global volcanism by volume.

Subaqueous volcanoes can be classified into three types:

1. Submarine volcanoes (comprising shallow-sea and deep-sea sub-types)
2. Subglacial volcanoes
3. Lacustrine volcanoes

Deep-sea submarine volcanoes form underwater mountains called seamounts. Many thousands of volcanic seamounts are scattered across the floors of the oceans. Other subaqueous volcanoes can be in the form of gently sloping tuff cones, although they can have steeper slopes, such as White Horse Bluff in the Wells Gray-Clearwater volcanic field of east-central British Columbia, Canada.

== Comparison to subaerial volcanoes ==
Subaqueous volcanoes can be compared to subaerial volcanoes which are formed and erupt on land. The major differences in their eruptions are due to the effects of pressure, heat capacity, thermal conductivity of water, and the presence of steam and water rheology. The thermal conductivity of water is about 20 times that of air, and steam has a thermal conductivity nearly 50 times that of water.

The study of subaqueous volcanoes has changed substantially. Modern studies offer fresh and unaltered observations, and one can see and map surface features and the water depth is known in areas that allow observation. Ancient studies relied on exposed stratigraphic sections, which are easier to observe and interpret in the field.

== Subaqueous pyroclastic flows ==
Some geologists restrict the term "subaqueous pyroclastic flow deposits" to volcaniclastic units that show characteristics of emplacement in a hot state deposited underwater. However, this cannot always be done because of the subsequent process of alteration or diagenesis such as can be found in active hot springs and the associated hydrothermal alteration. Deposits from pyroclastic flows, the kind that interact with water before transforming into water-supported mass flows, are called "subaqueous pyroclastic debris flow deposits" by some geologists.

On the other hand, processes that are associated with eruption, transportation and deposition are notably different because of the presence of water, including the ability to vaporize when in contact with water, a high density and resulting confining pressure, high viscosity relative to air and differences in the thermal conductivity/specific heat capacity of air relative to water.

== Deposits in Honshu ==
Some understanding of subaqueous volcanoes can be inferred from knowledge of volcanic processes based on ancient successions. Subaqueous volcano deposits have been occurring in the south of Honshu, the largest island among Japan's four principal islands. The four subaqueous volcanic deposits that have been documented offer significant evidence to study.

== Features ==
=== Subaqueous sedimentary deposits ===
Subaqueous volcanic deposits are associated with subaqueous sedimentary deposits, which range from near shore and offshore to abyssal mudstone deposits. Unfortunately, paleo-depth constraints for sedimentary strata are poor and subject to conflicting interpretations. However, the depth of emplacement can be conjectured with minor control of water depth. In determining the characteristics of pyroclastic flows in subaerial versus subaqueous deposits, it is commonly believed that water fluidized volcaniclastic flows become normally graded in terms of all components except for large, buoyant pumice blocks which settle to form large pumice layers. However, such layers are usually seen as subaerial ignimbrite (pumice-rich pyroclastic flows) deposits. Because of this, they are not considered clear evidence for the interpretation of the fluidizing agent (hot gas or water) and can therefore only be interpreted in conjunction with other criteria.

=== Characteristics ===
Characteristics can be sorted to infer subaqueous eruption or emplacement of silicic pyroclastic deposits. Larger pumice blocks rise for a more extended period of time (minutes to hours) in comparison to smaller pumice fragments because of gases trapped within vesicles and the possibility of fine ash fragments becoming entrained into the rising plume of gas and heated water because of the low density and weight. Therefore, subaqueous silicic pyroclastic eruptions may be diminished in the course size fraction as well as the very fine ash size fraction based on the buoyancy of the material in the water medium. These characteristics are important in determining the style of subaqueous eruption and emplacement mechanism. The characteristics of texture, such as grain morphology and grain size abundances also provide information on the process of the eruption style, transport, or flow properties, whether turbulent or laminar.

=== Seafloor exploration ===
Seafloor exploration has discovered that more volcanic eruptions occur at the bottom of the sea than on land. However, the effects of ambient water and hydrostatic pressure on silicic volcanic eruptions in subaqueous settings are not entirely understood due to the inability of deep marine eruptions to be directly observed and studied. Because of this, information about recent deep-water volcanic eruptions is still incomplete and limited.
