= Azure Lake =

Lake in British Columbia, Canada

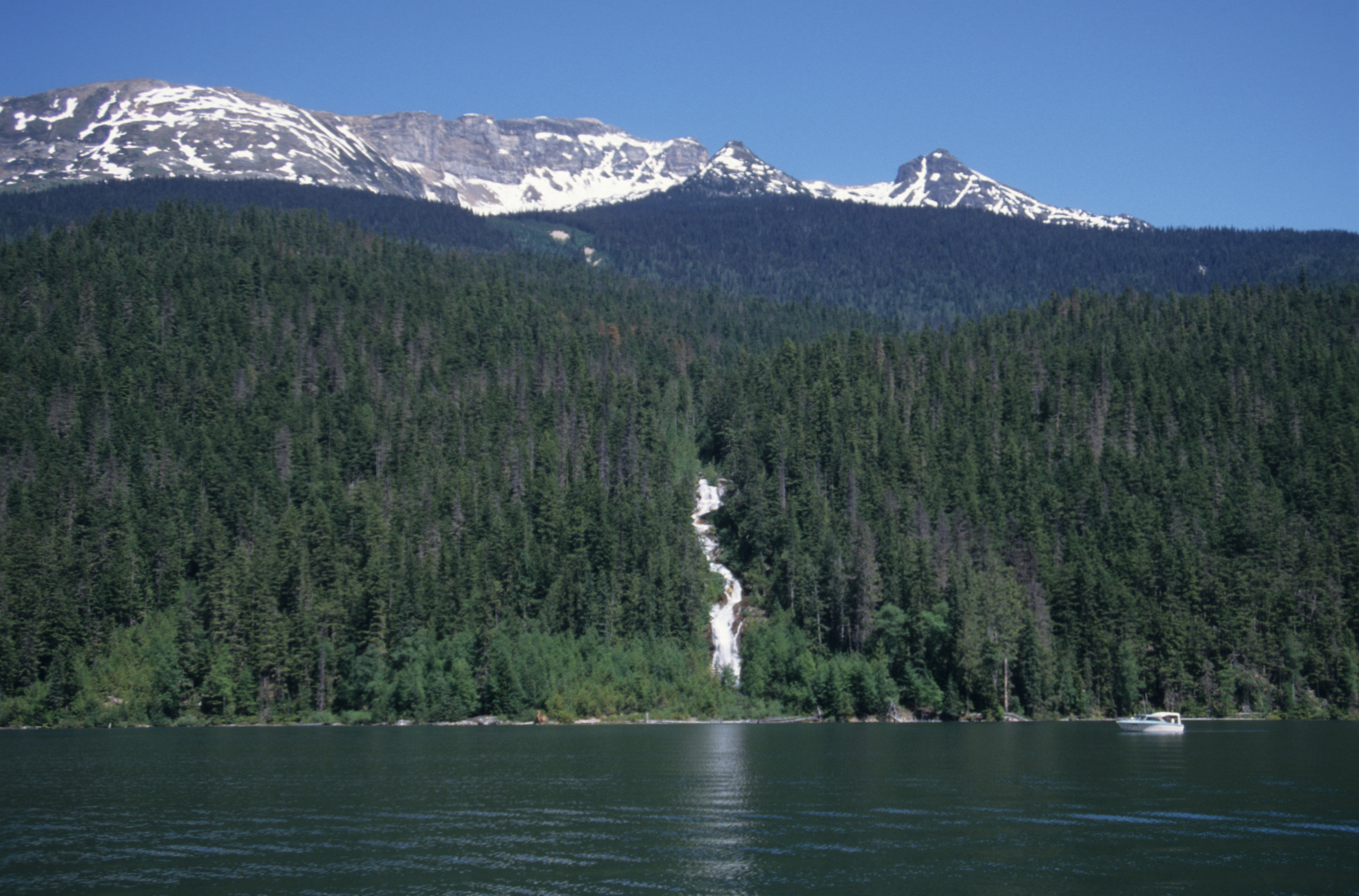
- Azure Lake at Garnet Falls with Tryfan Mtn behind

- Location within British Columbia
- Location: British Columbia
- Coordinates: 52°23′00″N 120°07′00″W
- Primary inflows: Azure River and Angus Horne Creek
- Primary outflows: Azure River
- Max. length: 24 km (15 mi)
- Max. width: 1.2 km (0.7 mi)
- Surface area: 30.5 km^{2} (11.8 sq mi)
- Average depth: 157.2 m (516 ft)
- Max. depth: 318 m (1,043 ft)
- Water volume: 4.792 km^{3} (1.150 cu mi)
- Shore length^{1}: 56.5 km (35.1 mi)
- Surface elevation: 682 m (2,238 ft)
- Islands: minor islets and skerries
- Settlements: None
- ^{1} Shore length is not a well-defined measure.

Azure Lake is a fjord-like lake located in east-central British Columbia, Canada. It is an expansion of the Azure River which rises from an unnamed glacier in the Cariboo Mountains. The outflow is also called the Azure River, but it is only 50 m (164 ft) long before it flows into the Clearwater River. Azure Lake is one of the six major lakes in Wells Gray Provincial Park.

== Geography ==
Azure Lake is ringed by peaks which rise about 1,800 m (5,906 ft) above its shoreline. North of the lake are Mount Huntley, Batoche Peak, Tryfan Mountain, and Buchanan Peak. Garnet Peak, Wells Gray Park's third highest mountain, rises north of Tryfan, but is not visible from anywhere on the lake. South of the lake are Zodiac Mountain and Azure Mountain. East of the lake's upper end is Mount Hogue. The deeply incised valley of Azure Lake was carved by glaciers during past Ice Ages resulting in rugged and steep shorelines. Hanging valleys are seen along both sides of the lake and there are waterfalls on nearly every tributary stream; Garnet Falls, Ludtke Falls, Crystal Falls, Roostertail Falls, and Rainbow Falls are the most notable.

== Origin of names ==
- Azure Lake refers to its colour. The name appeared on a map in 1914 and in the BC Gazetteer in 1930. It was sometimes also called Blue Lake. Angus Horne may have named the lake. He settled at Blue River in the North Thompson Valley in 1912 and prospected, trapped and explored in these mountains.
- Angus Horne Lake and Angus Horne Creek which flows into Azure Lake are named for him (see above).
- Mount Huntley was named by Chess Lyons in 1940. He was dispatched by Arthur Wellesley Gray, British Columbia's Minister of Lands, six months after Wells Gray Park was created, to explore the park and report on its significant features. Huntley Campbell was his assistant.
- Buchanan Peak was also named by Chess Lyons. Robert "Buck" and Sarah Buchanan were from Texas and lived at Deception Point on Mahood Lake from 1933 to 1941. His two boats, Albedrio and Manana, transported the Lyons expedition along Mahood and Canim Lakes.
- Garnet Peak was named by Hugh Neave after leading the first ascent in 1974. He found garnets in several places on the peak.
- Tryfan Mountain was named by Hugh Neave after the Welsh peak where he learned rock climbing as a boy.
- Mount Hogue was named by Chess Lyons for trappers Henry and John Hogue who built Helmcken Falls Lodge, Wells Gray Park's first lodging, in 1948.
- Ludtke Falls remembers the pioneer Ludtke family in the Clearwater Valley, parents Gus and Berta, and children Fred, Alice, Laurence, Charlie, and Robert. They settled near Battle Creek in 1923.

== Access and trails ==
There are no roads to Azure Lake. The only access is by boat from the end of the Clearwater Valley Road at the south end of Clearwater Lake. Motorboats can easily travel up Clearwater Lake, through the connecting Clearwater River and Azure River for 2.9 km (1.8 mi) to Azure Lake. Canoeists and kayakers can paddle up Clearwater Lake, then take the portage trail over to Azure Lake. Azure Lake can also be reached by a water taxi operated by Clearwater Lake Tours. A popular multi-day trip is to take the water taxi, loaded with canoes or kayaks, to Rainbow Falls then paddle back to the south end of Clearwater Lake. Access by air is restricted and a special permit from B.C. Parks is required to land a float plane or helicopter at Azure Lake.

Rainbow Falls near east end of Azure Lake

There are four campsites along Azure Lake: Osprey and Rainbow Falls on the south shore and Indian Point and Four and a Half Mile on the north shore. Fees are paid at the boat launching ramp on Clearwater Lake. Sites cannot be reserved in advance.

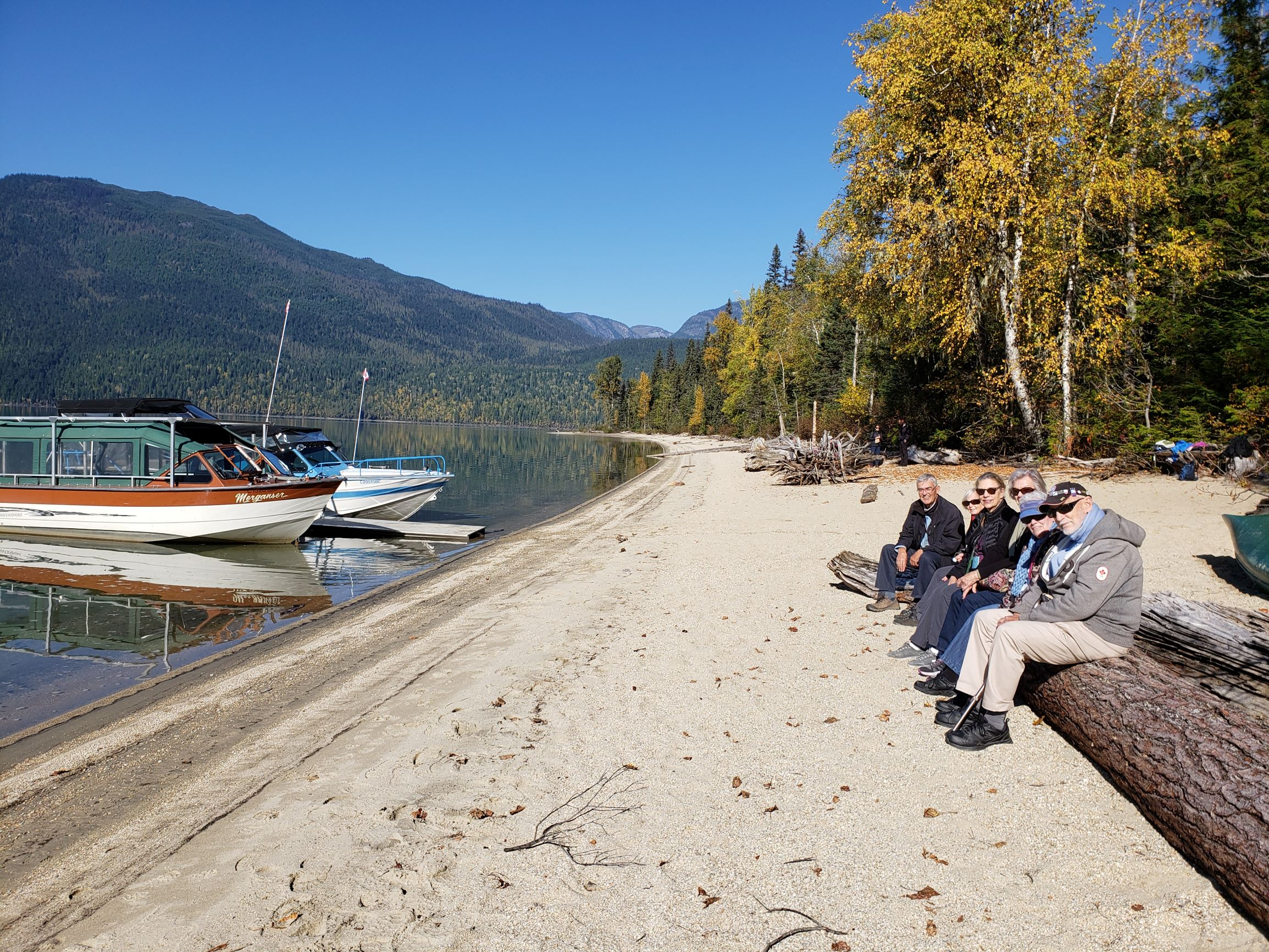
Azure Lake at Rainbow Falls beach

There is only one hiking trail from the shore of Azure Lake and it leads to Huntley Col. It was first blazed by mountain climber and explorer, Hugh Neave, in 1966 and improved by other hikers. It is a strenuous five-hour climb of 1,370 m (4,495 ft). From the Col, the peaks along the Huntley-Buchanan Ridge can be climbed on a multi-day expedition with a base camp at Huntley Col where water is available. Garnet Peak is usually a four-day climb via the Huntley Col trail and requires technical rock climbing experience. Other than this trail, hiking from Azure Lake is difficult due to extremely dense undergrowth.

== See also ==
- List of lakes of British Columbia
