= North Thompson River Provincial Park =

Provincial park in British Columbia, Canada

Lockhart Beach Provincial Park
- IUCN category II (national park)
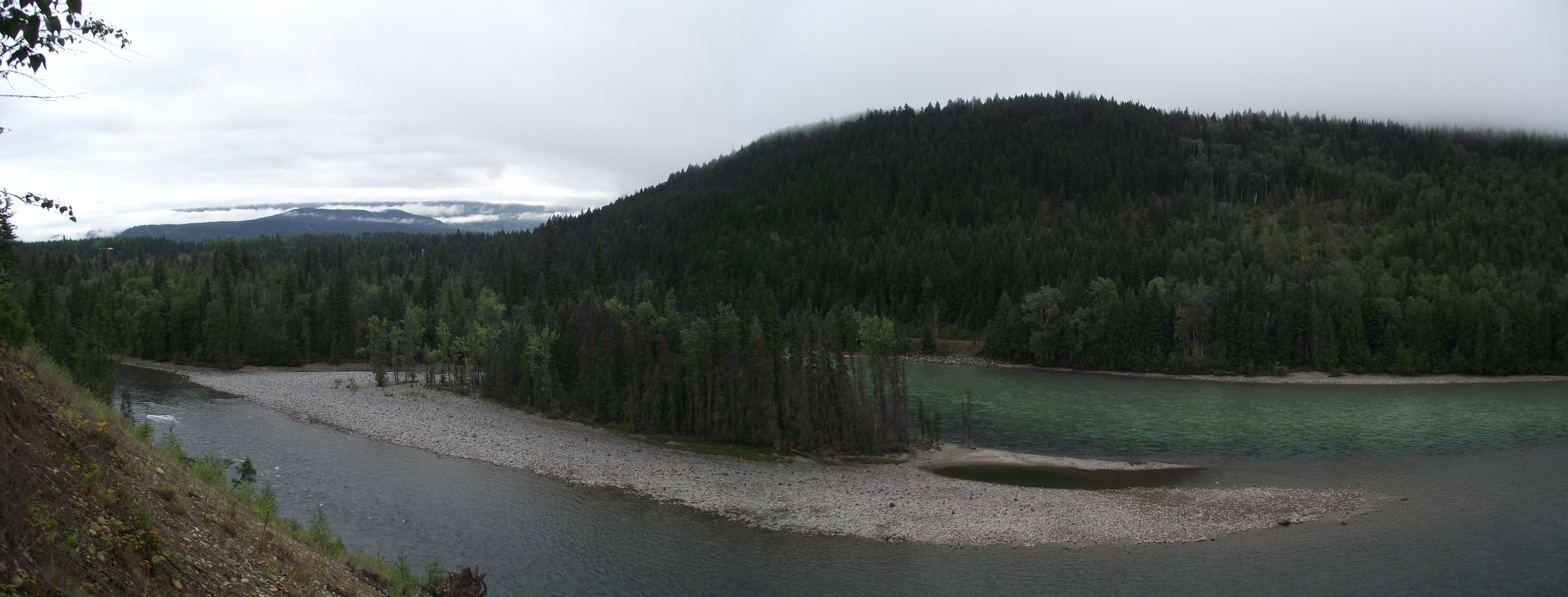
- Panoramic view

- Location within British Columbia
- Interactive map of Lockhart Beach Provincial Park
- Location: British Columbia, Canada
- Nearest city: Clearwater
- Coordinates: 51°37′39″N 120°05′14″W
- Area: 1.26 km^{2} (0.49 sq mi)
- Established: 1967
- Governing body: BC Parks

North Thompson River Provincial Park is a provincial park in British Columbia, Canada.
