= Mount Goodall =

Mountain in British Columbia, Canada

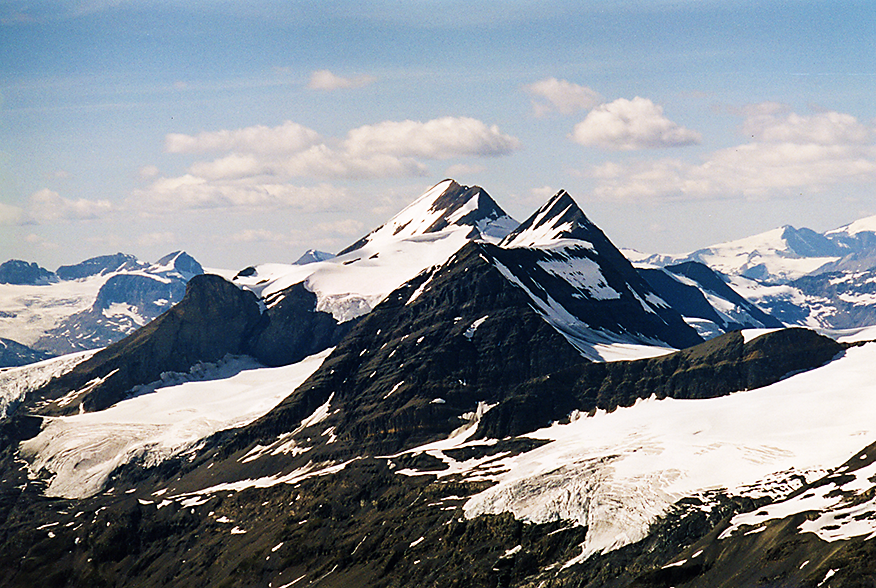
- Mount Goodall from the southeast

Highest point
- Elevation: 2,930 m (9,610 ft)
- Listing: Mountains of British Columbia
- Coordinates: 52°46′N 120°05′W

Geography
- Location within British Columbia
- Interactive map of Mount Goodall
- Location: British Columbia, Canada
- District: Kamloops Division Yale Land District
- Parent range: Cariboo Mountains
- Topo map: 93A16 Mount Winder or PS-WG3 (north half)

Geology
- Mountain type: Pyramidal peak

Climbing
- First ascent: August 21, 2006
- Easiest route: Via Turquoise Pass

Mount Goodall is a mountain in east-central British Columbia, Canada, located near the headwaters of the Clearwater River. Situated in the Cariboo Mountains of the Columbia Mountains, it is the second highest mountain in Wells Gray Provincial Park with an elevation of 2,930 m (9,613 ft). Mount Goodall has 11 distinct summits and extends nearly 8 km (5.0 mi) in a northwest to southeast direction. On the northeast side, an unbreached wall of rock and ice rises between 400 m (1,312 ft) and 1,300 m (4,265 ft) from the Goodall Glacier.

The first ascent of Mount Goodall was on August 21, 2006 by Roger Wallis, Don Chiasson, and Jim Lundy from the Alpine Club of Canada. They established its height, only 16 m (52 ft) lower than nearby Mount Lyons, Wells Gray Park's highest mountain. Their expedition took four days and the summit climb from their base camp at Turquoise Pass took 12 hours. As of 2022, only four of Goodall's summits have been climbed.

Mount Goodall was named in 1966 in honor of Canadian Army Trooper Walter Henry Goodall, K 76212, from Macalister (near Quesnel, British Columbia). He was serving with the Governor General's Horse Guards, RCAC, when he was killed in action on January 4, 1945, age 24. Five other neighbouring peaks were named at the same time for Canadian soldiers from the Quesnel area who were killed during World War II: Mount Pierrway, Mount Winder, Mount Beaman, Mount Hogg, and Mount Aves.
