= Mount Hugh Neave =

Mountain in British Columbia, Canada

- Mount Hugh Neave (center) from Hobson Glacier

Highest point
- Elevation: 2,829 m (9,281 ft)
- Prominence: 1,970 m (6,460 ft)
- Listing: Mountains of British Columbia
- Coordinates: 52°30′35″N 120°13′44″W

Geography
- Location within British Columbia
- Interactive map of Mount Hugh Neave
- Location: British Columbia, Canada
- District: Kamloops Division Yale Land District
- Parent range: Cariboo Mountains
- Topo map: NTS 93A9 Hobson Lake or PS-WG3 (north half)

Geology
- Mountain type: Arête

Climbing
- First ascent: August 27, 2019
- Easiest route: East from Hobson Lake

Mount Hugh Neave is a mountain in east-central British Columbia, Canada, located between Hobson Lake to the west and Goat Creek to the south. Situated in the Cariboo Mountains of the Columbia Mountains, it is the seventh highest mountain in Wells Gray Provincial Park with an elevation of 2,829 m (9,281 ft).

== Naming ==
Mount Hugh Neave is named for Hugh Neave (1909–1988) who was a mountaineer, rock climber and backcountry explorer of Wells Gray Park from 1966 to 1987. He was a latecomer among the explorers of Wells Gray Park, but he was drawn by the scenery and the challenge of mountaineering, rather than by the wealth of mining, trapping or guiding. In 1966, he made his first expedition to the Huntley-Buchanan Ridge north of Azure Lake and was a regular visitor to those peaks for the next 20 years.

In 1972, Neave and Peter Cowan of New Zealand attempted to climb Mount Hugh Neave via the Hobson Glacier east of the peak. They reached an elevation of 2,400 m (7,874 ft) on its south side, but ran short of time for an Azure Lake boat rendezvous and had to retreat through the Goat Creek valley. In those years, the boat did not pass several times a day as it does now, so missing an arranged meeting could have meant a long wait for the next boat arrival.

Neave organized three expeditions to Garnet Peak, Wells Gray Park's third highest mountain, which were all turned back by severe weather. He blazed the first trail from Azure Lake to Huntley Col and improved it with each trip. Today, it is the only trail from the lakeshore and is maintained by its users. Finally, in 1974 at the age of 65, Neave launched his fourth expedition with Barb Hargreaves and Tor Schmid, and they achieved the first ascent of Garnet Peak. Neave named the mountain for the small garnets he found in rock formations near the summit.

Neave also travelled around the world seeking mountaineering adventures. In 1978 he led a month-long expedition to the Andes of Peru, in 1986 he canoed the Yukon River from Whitehorse to Dawson City, and his last major expedition was a 1987 trek in the Himalayas at age 78. Neave died in 1988 and Mount Hugh Neave was named the following year in recognition of his climbs in northern Wells Gray Park. Later in 1988, members of the Kamloops Mountaineering Club carried his ashes to the top of Garnet Peak.

== Access ==
The Kamloops Mountaineering Club organized two expeditions during the 1990s with the goal of reaching the summit of Mount Hugh Neave. Both flew to Hobson Lake and started the climb from the sandspit about halfway up the lake. They reached the alpine meadows both times after a rigorous bushwhack, but were turned back by severe weather conditions. One of the major challenges is the climb through dense forest and undergrowth from Hobson Lake. Helicopters and float planes require a permit from B.C. Parks to land at Hobson Lake and no other landing sites closer to the mountain are allowed.

On topographical maps, a route up Goat Creek to the base of Mount Hugh Neave appears feasible. The Neave/Cowan expedition of 1972 proved the opposite during their forced retreat to Azure Lake. Neave described Goat Creek in his diary, "It is usually a matter of fighting a recurrent medley of slide alder, devil’s club, scrub growth and a vast jumble of rotting deadfall, eked out by beaver swamps along the valley bottom." His advice to future climbers: "Remember the going will always be tough, daily mileages will be much less than expected, a nose for route finding in poor visibility is essential, and a search and rescue operation will have a minimal chance of success."

After a 20-year hiatus, the fourth expedition to Mount Hugh Neave was launched in July 2015. Members were Fraser Neave, Hugh Neave's grandson, Fred Erler and Ken Kram. They reached an altitude of 2,444 m (8,018 ft) on the southwest ridge and were turned back by a deep impassable cleft. Since the northwest ridge has technical challenges and the eastern approach is impracticable due to the helicopter ban, there are no plans for another expedition.

On August 27, 2019, the summit was reached by Travis Goodridge and Jean-Francois Labranche. The party paddled Clearwater Lake, then hiked the trail to Hobson Lake. The ascent route started 6 km (3.7 mi) up Hobson Lake and successfully circumvented the cleft on the west ridge that had foiled previous attempts.
