= C. P. Lyons =

Canadian natural historian (1915–1998)

- Born: 1915; Near Regina, Saskatchewan
- Died: December 20, 1998 (aged 82–83); Hawaii, U.S.
- Citizenship: Canadian
- Education: University of British Columbia
- Writing career
- Period: 1950–1997
- Genre: Natural History
- Notable works: Trees, Shrubs, and Flowers to Know in British Columbia

Chester Peter "Chess" Lyons (1915 – December 20, 1998) was a Canadian outdoorsman and natural historian. The author of several books on the flora and landscape of the Pacific Northwest, Lyons is best known for his popular and widely cited botanical field guides.

Lyons grew up in the Okanagan Valley of British Columbia and in 1938 became a forestry engineer at a time when the Parks Branch was part of the B.C. Forest Service. Lyons designed many trails, campgrounds and picnic sites for the early provincial parks. In 1940, six months after Wells Gray Provincial Park was created, he was assigned by the Minister of Lands, Arthur Wellesley Gray, to explore and map the area. The park boundaries had been arbitrarily drawn around the drainage basin of the Clearwater River and few people knew what had been included in this huge new park. His four-month expedition produced the first maps of the new Park and he established about a quarter of its current place names, all carefully researched to remember settlers, prospectors, explorers, forest rangers, and other people who had lived and worked in the Clearwater Valley.

After his Wells Gray Park survey, Lyons headed similar exploratory expeditions into Tweedsmuir and Manning Provincial Parks. In the 1950s, Lyons visited Liard River Hot Springs, then known as Theresa Hot Springs, in his homemade caravan and surveyed potential park boundaries. He returned to Victoria and recommended that the Hot Springs be made in to a provincial park; this occurred in 1957. Lyons was also responsible for negotiations with land owners to secure the original Barkerville historic site and he acquired many artifacts that have brought realism to this popular heritage site. Lyons persuaded the Summerland Agricultural Research Station to part with some federal land along Okanagan Lake which became the popular parks of Sun-Oka Beach, Pyramid, Kickininee, and Soorimpt. British Columbia travellers in the 1960s and 1970s remember the "Garbage Gobblers" at many viewpoints; Lyons designed these concrete green and yellow figures with big white teeth and a sign "Please Feed Me". He also planned the numerous Stop of Interest signs which were 50-word snippets of information along the province's highways.

Starting in the late 1960s, Lyons became a well-known outdoors photographer with frequent appearances on the CBC nature show, Klahanie. As a film lecturer for the National Audubon Society and the World Around Us travel series, he brought British Columbia to audiences in many North American cities. He wrote several books (see Bibliography) and is probably best known for Trees, Shrubs and Flowers to Know in British Columbia, plus several other popular field guides on the plants of British Columbia and Washington State. These books have appeared in many revised editions since 1952 and have been used by many outdoors people, tourists, and natural history students and professionals. In his later years, Lyons was an avid bird-watcher and took up landscape painting to depict the essence of ecosystems that were special to him.

Mount Lyons, the highest mountain in Wells Gray Park at 2,946 m (9,665 ft), is named for Chess Lyons, recognizing his many accomplishments and especially his 1940 survey of the Park.

== Bibliography ==
Milestones on the Mighty Fraser (Dent, 1950; Vancouver: Evergreen Press, 1958).

Trees, Shrubs and Flowers to Know in British Columbia, 1952.

Trees, Shrubs and Flowers to Know in Washington, 1956.

Trees, Shrubs and Flowers to Know in Washington and British Columbia, 1995 (with Bill Merilees).

Milestones in Ogopogo Land: In Which the Many Wonders of the Land of Ogopogo and Sunshine Are Revealed. Evergreen Press, 1957.

Milestones on Vancouver Island: the Story of This Island to the West, Its Past and Its Present. Evergreen Press, 1958.

Milestones in Ogopogo Land. Foremost Publishing Co. Ltd., 1970

Okanagan Valley. Heritage House Pub. Co., 1985.

Fraser and Thompson River Canyons (Surrey: Heritage House, 1986).

Wildflowers of Washington, 1997.
