= Garnet Peak =

Mountain in British Columbia, Canada

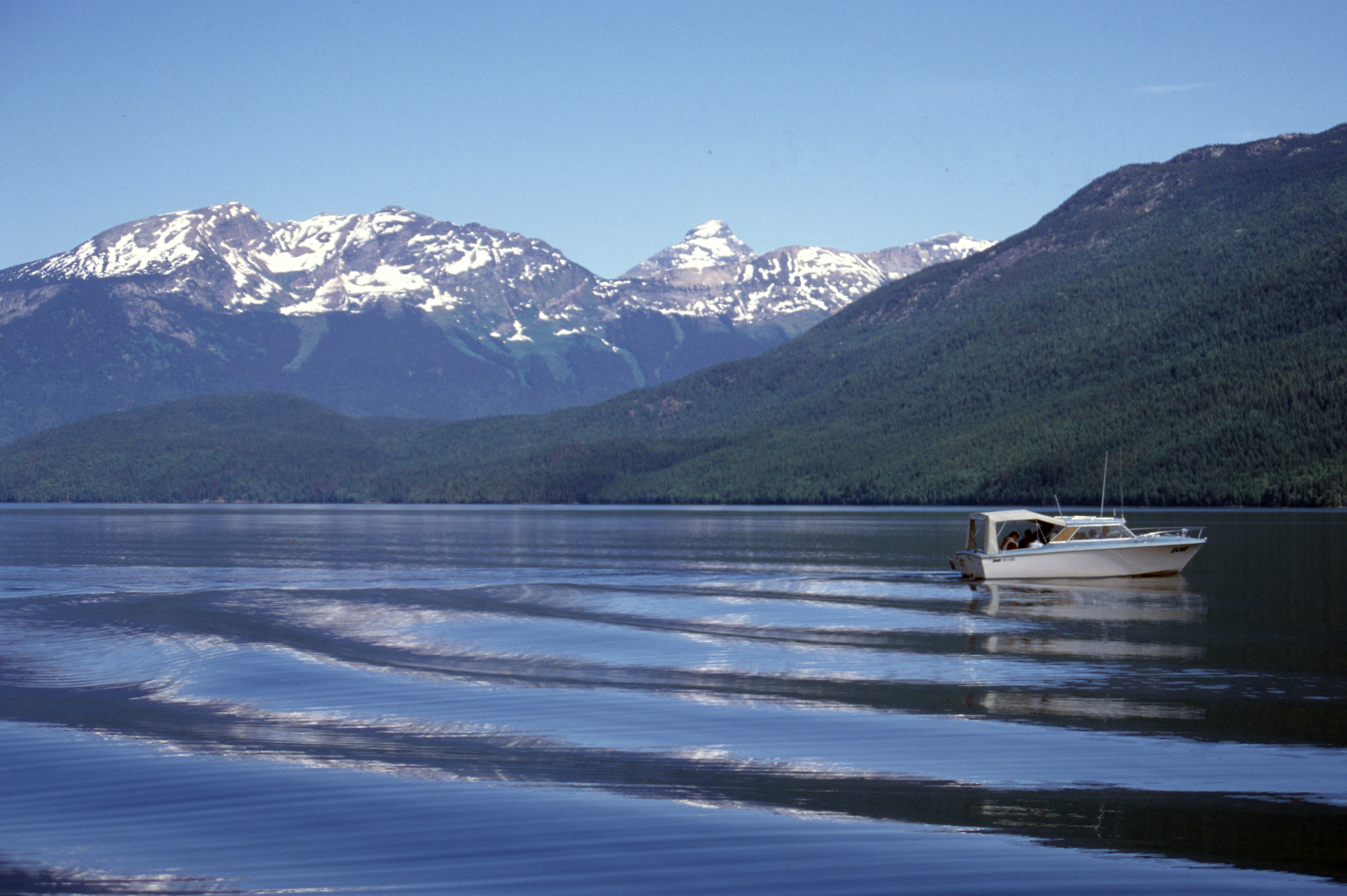
- Garnet Peak (center) from Clearwater Lake

Highest point
- Elevation: 2,876 m (9,436 ft)
- Prominence: 476 m (1,562 ft)
- Listing: Mountains of British Columbia
- Coordinates: 52°26′33″N 120°11′46″W

Geography
- Location within British Columbia
- Location: British Columbia, Canada
- District: Kamloops Division Yale Land District
- Parent range: Cariboo Mountains
- Topo map: NTS 93A8 Azure Lake

Geology
- Mountain type: Pyramidal peak

Climbing
- First ascent: August 29, 1974 by Hugh Neave (leader), Barb Hargreaves, Tor Schmid
- Easiest route: Southwest ridge via Huntley Col and Tryfan Mtn

Garnet Peak is a mountain in east-central British Columbia, Canada, located between Goat Creek and Azure Lake. Situated in the Cariboo Mountains of the Columbia Mountains, it is the third highest mountain in Wells Gray Provincial Park with an elevation of 2,876 m (9,436 ft). Garnet Peak is a prominent mountain as one drives the Clearwater Valley Road into Wells Gray Park and is first visible from 80 km (50 mi) south at the Clearwater Valley Overlook.

Garnet Peak stands alone as a pyramidal peak. From Clearwater Lake, it appears to be part of the Huntley-Buchanan Ridge which extends most of the length of Azure Lake on its north side. It is actually located about 3 km (1.9 mi) north of Tryfan Mountain and the two are connected by a broad hogsback at an elevation of 2,400 m (7,874 ft). This fact becomes obvious as one travels north on Clearwater Lake by boat; Garnet Peak actually gets smaller and eventually disappears behind the Huntley-Buchanan Ridge. Garnet Peak is not visible from anywhere on Azure Lake.

== First ascent ==
Garnet Peak was first climbed on August 29, 1974, by Hugh Neave (leader), Barb Hargreaves and Tor Schmid. Hugh Neave was a latecomer among the explorers of Wells Gray Park, but he was drawn by the scenery and the challenge of mountaineering, rather than by the wealth of mining, trapping or guiding. In 1966, he made his first expedition to the Huntley-Buchanan Ridge and was a regular visitor to those peaks for the next 20 years. An ascent of Garnet Peak had been Neave's dream since he first saw the mountain in 1966 and he organized three expeditions which were all turned back by severe weather. He blazed the first trail from Azure Lake to Huntley Col and improved it with each trip. Today, it is the only trail from the lakeshore and is maintained by its users. Finally, in 1974 at the age of 65, Neave achieved his dream when he summited Garnet Peak and he named the mountain for the small garnets he found in rock formations near the summit. Neave died in 1988 and Mount Hugh Neave, just north of Garnet Peak, was named the following year in recognition of his climbs in northern Wells Gray Park. Later in 1988, members of the Kamloops Mountaineering Club carried his ashes to the top of Garnet Peak.

== Access and climbing route ==
Garnet Peak has only been climbed about 30 times since 1974 which attests to the difficulty of the ascent, requiring a three-day backpack, some snow and ice traverses, and some rope and piton work. It is the access and the unpredictable weather in northern Wells Gray Park which turn back most expeditions. A Garnet Peak ascent should be planned for four days, but can be done in three.

Kamloops Mountaineering Club below Garnet Peak in 1988

The Huntley Col trail starts at Four and a Half Mile Campground on the north shore of Azure Lake. It goes straight up the mountain without the pleasantry of switchbacks and is a steady grind of 1,370 m (4,495 ft) to the Col. This climb takes at least five hours with backpacks. Huntley Col, between Mount Huntley to the west and Batoche Peak to the east, is the best place to camp since there is a year-round snow patch for water and it is sheltered from the near constant wind. On the second day, the route contours along the north side of Batoche and Tryfan, then traverses the hogsback north to Garnet. The climb itself is mostly on the southwest ridge with one rock pitch of 25 m (82 ft) where a rope and pitons are necessary and a rappel on the descent. The round trip from Huntley Col to the summit takes about 12 hours. The third day is the descent to Azure Lake. The optional fourth day is a cushion in case of bad weather, or it can be used for a hike along the Huntley-Buchanan Ridge as far as Tryfan Mountain. For a detailed description of the Garnet Peak climbing route, see Exploring Wells Gray Park, pages 239-241.
