= Ball Creek (British Columbia) =

Tributary river in the country of Canada

- Mouth of Ball Creek

Location
- Country: Canada
- Province: British Columbia
- District: Cassiar Land District

Physical characteristics
- Source: Near Yeda Peak
  - location: Spectrum Range
  - coordinates: 57°21′41″N 130°41′49″W
  - elevation: 1,810 m (5,940 ft)
- Mouth: Iskut River
  - coordinates: 57°14′26″N 130°15′57″W
  - elevation: 575 m (1,886 ft)
- Length: 41 km (25 mi)
- Basin size: 342 km^{2} (132 sq mi)
- Discharge
  - average: 13.4 m^{3}/s (470 cu ft/s)

Basin features
- Tributaries
  - right: Chachani Creek
- Topo map: NTS 104G1 Iskut River (North); NTS 104G2 More Creek; NTS 104G7 Mess Lake; NTS 104G8 Refuge Lake

Ball Creek is a tributary of the Iskut River and part of the Stikine River watershed in northwest part of the province of British Columbia, Canada. From its source in the mountains south of Mount Edziza, near Yeda Peak, it flows generally southeast and east for roughly 41 km (25 mi) to empty into the Iskut River, the largest tributary of the Stikine River.

Ball Creek's mean annual discharge is estimated at 13.4 m^{3}/s (470 cu ft/s). Its watershed covers 342 km^{2} (132 sq mi), the upper part of which is within Mount Edziza Provincial Park. The watershed drains parts of the Mount Edziza volcanic complex. The watershed's land cover is classified as 35.7% barren, 24.3% conifer forest, 14.9% herbaceous, 14.6% snow/glacier, 10.2% shrubland, and small amounts of other cover.

The mouth of Ball Creek is located about 30 km (19 mi) north of the community of Bob Quinn Lake, British Columbia, and about 90 km (56 mi) southeast of Telegraph Creek, British Columbia, and about 275 km (171 mi) east-southeast of Juneau, Alaska.

Ball Creek is the traditional territory of the Tahltan First Nation, of the Tahltan people.

Ball Creek was named for a Mr. Ball of Telegraph Creek, a telegraph lineworker.

== Geography ==
Ball Creek originates near Yeda Peak of the Spectrum Range south of Mount Edziza. From its source about 40 km (25 mi) south of the summit of Mount Edziza, Ball Creek first flows east through high mountains. Near Kounugu Mountain it turns to the southeast. It passes just west of Little Ball Lake, which is not part of Ball Creek's drainage but rather the source of the Little Iskut River.

After flowing about 18 km (11 mi) from its source, Ball Creek is joined by Chachani Creek, draining part of Arctic Lake Plateau. Ball Creek exits Mount Edziza Provincial Park at its confluence with Chachani Creek. After a few more kilometers Ball Creek receives a significant but unnamed tributary and turns to flow mostly east. At about 25 km (16 mi) from its source Ball Creek receives another significant but unnamed tributary which flows from glaciers and mountains to the southwest, such as Hankin Peak. From there, Ball Creek flows generally east, receiving several more unnamed tributaries before emptying into the Iskut River.

== See also ==
- List of rivers of British Columbia
