= More Creek =

Tributary river in the country of Canada

- Mouth of More Creek

Location
- Country: Canada
- Province: British Columbia
- District: Cassiar Land District

Physical characteristics
- Source: Near Yeda Peak
  - location: Spectrum Range
  - coordinates: 57°21′5″N 130°41′14″W
  - elevation: 1,935 m (6,348 ft)
- Mouth: Iskut River
  - coordinates: 57°1′40″N 130°21′30″W
  - elevation: 380 m (1,250 ft)
- Length: 65 km (40 mi)
- Basin size: 912 km^{2} (352 sq mi)
- Discharge
  - average: 50.6 m^{3}/s (1,790 cu ft/s)

Basin features
- Topo map: NTS 104G1 Iskut River (North); NTS 104G2 More Creek; NTS 104G7 Mess Lake

More Creek is a tributary of the Iskut River and part of the Stikine River watershed in northwest part of the province of British Columbia, Canada. From its source near Yeda Peak in the Spectrum Range south of Mount Edziza, it flows generally south and east for roughly 65 km (40 mi) to empty into the Iskut River, the largest tributary of the Stikine River.

More Creek's mean annual discharge is estimated at 50.6 m^{3}/s (1,790 cu ft/s). Its watershed covers 912 km^{2} (352 sq mi), the northernmost part of which is within Mount Edziza Provincial Park. The watershed drains parts of the Mount Edziza volcanic complex. The watershed's land cover is classified as 28.8% barren, 28.5% snow/glacier, 23.3% conifer forest, 10.0% herbaceous, 6.8% shrubland, and small amounts of other cover.

The mouth of More Creek is located about 9 km (5.6 mi) northwest of the community of Bob Quinn Lake, British Columbia, and about 110 km (68 mi) south of Telegraph Creek, British Columbia, and about 280 km (170 mi) southeast of Juneau, Alaska.

More Creek is the traditional territory of the Tahltan First Nation, of the Tahltan people.

== History ==
The British Columbia-based Alaska Hydro Corporation was planning to construct and operate a hydroelectric facility that would dam More Creek and create a storage reservoir, which was opposed by the Tahltan Nation. In 2022 the Impact Assessment Agency of Canada terminated the More Creek Hydroelectric Project, citing the failure of Alaska Hydro to provide required information or studies within the legislated time limit.

== Geography ==
More Creek originates near Yeda Peak, among the high peaks and glaciers of the Spectrum Range, south of Mount Edziza, and not far from the sources of Ball Creek and Tadekho Creek. From More Creek's source about 40 km (25 mi) south of the summit of Mount Edziza, the creek flows a winding path through the highlands of Arctic Lake Plateau, gathering various tributaries that also meander through this high plateau. Flowing mostly south, by Nahta Cone and Wetalth Ridge, More Creek exits Mount Edziza Provincial Park. Shortly after which it enters a forested glacially-carved U-shaped valley. Continuing south, various unnamed tributary streams join, many flowing from the southern end of Arctic Lake Plateau.

At about 24 km (15 mi) from its source, More Creek is joined by an unnamed tributary flowing from Arctic Lake. It then flows along the west side of Hankin Peak, which contributes many glacial meltwater streams from several glaciers such as Matthew Glacier. At about 32 km (20 mi) from its source a large but unnamed tributary joins More Creek from the west. This tributary, which arises near the source of Mess Creek, gathers the meltwater of many glaciers, such as Alexander Glacier.

As More Creek continues south it becomes highly braided for a few kilometers. In this section another significant but unnamed tributary joins from the west. This tributary flows from various high peaks and glaciers, including Natavas Glacier and Yuri Glacier. Its course takes it close to the source of Forrest Kerr Creek. In its lower section this tributary becomes highly braided. Its confluence with More Creek occurs in a large maze of braided channels.

For the rest of its course, More Creek flows generally east, at first braided, then gathered into a single channel, then braided again for several kilometers. Then its waters form a single channel and cascade down some rapids close to its mouth on the Iskut River. Just north of More Creek's mouth is Iskut River Hot Springs Provincial Park.

== See also ==
- List of rivers of British Columbia
