= Spectrum Range =

Mountain range in British Columbia, Canada

- Spectrum Mountains; Rainbow Mountains
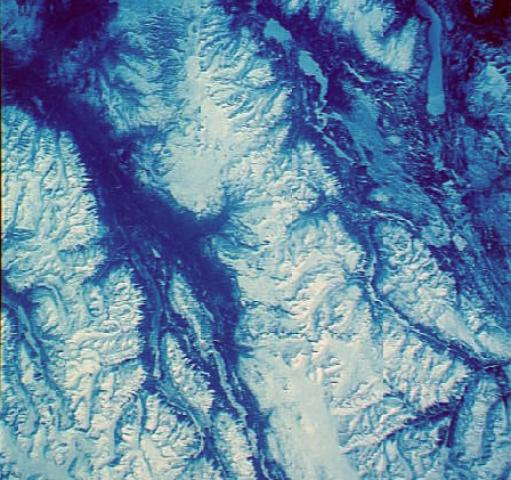
- The snow-covered mountains at the right-centre, lying between the Mess Creek (left) and Little Iskut River (right) drainages, are in the Spectrum Range. Mount Edziza appears at the top of this image west of snow-covered Nuttlude and Kakiddi lakes.

Highest point
- Peak: Kitsu Peak
- Elevation: 2,430 m (7,970 ft)
- Coordinates: 57°25′25″N 130°41′24″W

Geography
- Location in British Columbia
- Location in Mount Edziza Provincial Park
- Country: Canada
- Province: British Columbia
- District: Cassiar Land District
- Protected area: Mount Edziza Provincial Park
- Range coordinates: 57°24′N 130°42′W
- Parent range: Tahltan Highland
- Borders on: Skeena Mountains (east); Coast Mountains (west); Arctic Lake Plateau (southwest); Kitsu Plateau (northwest)
- Topo map: NTS 104G7 Mess Lake

Geology
- Formed by: Volcanism and erosion
- Rock age: 3.5–2.5 million years old
- Rock type(s): Rhyolite, trachyte, basalt
- Volcanic zone: Northern Cordilleran Province
- Last eruption: Unknown

The Spectrum Range is a small mountain range in Cassiar Land District of northwestern British Columbia, Canada. Located on the Tahltan Highland, it borders the Skeena Mountains in the east and the Boundary Ranges of the Coast Mountains in the west. The range is bounded by the Arctic Lake Plateau in the southwest and the Kitsu Plateau in the northwest. It lies at the southern end of the Mount Edziza volcanic complex, which includes the two neighbouring plateaus and the Big Raven Plateau to the north. The range contains glaciers and is drained on all sides by streams within the Stikine River watershed. It is characterized by multi-coloured rocks, after which the range is named. Kitsu Peak, the highest point of the range, reaches an elevation of 2,430 metres (7,970 feet). The range is a protected area as it lies within Mount Edziza Provincial Park, one of the largest provincial parks in British Columbia.

The Spectrum Range is the eroded remains of a large lava dome whose original surface is only preserved as a few small remnants on the summits of the higher peaks. This dome, originally more than 25 kilometres (16 miles) wide, formed between 3.5 and 2.5 million years ago during the second magmatic cycle of the Mount Edziza volcanic complex. Much of the dome consists of massive rhyolite and trachyte lava flows, but relatively minor basalt flows erupted later during the dome's formation. These lava flows form the nearly circular group of pyramidal peaks and long, narrow-crested ridges comprising the range; the basalt flows mainly cap the higher peaks. Volcanism in the last 2.5 million years has mostly occurred on the northwestern and southwestern sides of the range, but the precise age of the latest eruption is unknown.

== Names and etymology ==
The Spectrum Range was labelled as the Rainbow Mountains on a BC Lands map published in 1929; this was followed by the renaming of the mountain range to the Spectrum Mountains in 1945. In 1954, the form of name was changed to the Spectrum Range in accordance with Geological Survey of Canada memoir 247 published in 1948. These names for the range refer to its multi-coloured rocks; pale green, light grey and white rocks weather to bright hues of orange, yellow and red. In the 1980 book Natural Wonders of the World, the range is also referred to as the Spectrums.

== Geography ==
=== Location ===
The Spectrum Range is located on the Tahltan Highland east of the Boundary Ranges of the Coast Mountains and west of the Skeena Mountains in Cassiar Land District. To the southwest, the range is bounded by the Arctic Lake Plateau, which includes adjacent volcanic features such as Wetalth Ridge, Nahta Cone and Tadekho Hill. The Kitsu Plateau bounds the range to the northwest and includes the Mess Lake Lava Field, which consists of lava flows and tephra from three pyroclastic cones. To the north and northeast, the range is bounded by Raspberry Pass and Artifact Creek valley, respectively; the latter separates Artifact Ridge from the Spectrum Range.

The Spectrum Range lies at the southern end of the Mount Edziza volcanic complex which includes the Arctic Lake and Kitsu plateaus, and Mount Edziza and the Big Raven Plateau to the north. The volcanic complex contains an intermontane plateau that is overlain by four central volcanoes along its north–south trending axis; the Spectrum Range is the southernmost and third oldest of these volcanoes. Surrounding the range is Mount Edziza Provincial Park, one of the largest provincial parks in British Columbia.

=== Structure ===
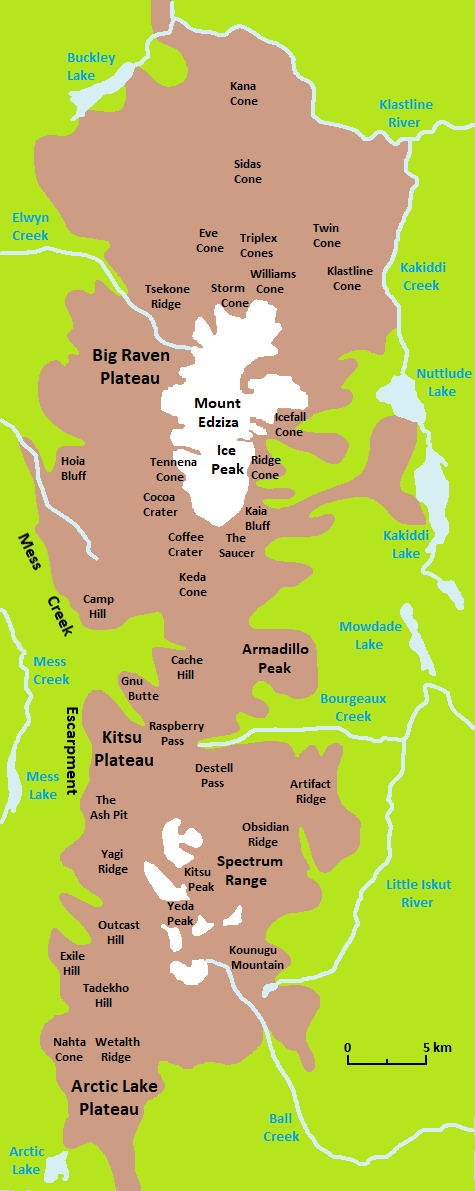
Map of the Mount Edziza volcanic complex showing the location of the Spectrum Range

The Spectrum Range consists of long, narrow-crested ridges and a nearly circular group of pyramidal peaks. Talus and felsenmeer deposits cover large portions of the valley slopes which rise to broad, rounded crests of the interfluvial ridges. These ridges are the eroded remains of a once-continuous lava dome whose original surface is only preserved as a few small remnants on the summits of the higher peaks. The ridges and peaks decrease in elevation away from the central portion of the range; among them are the Kitsu, Yeda and Kuno peaks and the Obsidian and Yagi ridges. Kounugu Mountain at the southwestern end of the range is the only feature with Mountain in its name. BC Geographical Names describes the Exile and Outcast hills as being in the Spectrum Range. However, Canadian volcanologist Jack Souther described these features as being on the adjoining Arctic Lake Plateau.

Several cirques in the Spectrum Range are bounded by sharp-edged ridges and, apart from trees in the lower valleys, the range is devoid of vegetation. The current, approximately 19-kilometre-wide (12-mile) dome forming the range originally had a width of more than 25 km (16 mi); erosional remnants occur at the northern and southwestern edges of the range. It was also originally higher than its current elevation of 2,430 metres (7,970 feet) as evidenced by the thick, gently dipping lava flows forming the summit of Kitsu Peak, the highest point of the range. The original volume of the Spectrum Dome is estimated to have been 101 km^{3} (24 mi^{3}) based on restoration calculations of the original surface.

=== Glaciation ===
As a part of the Mount Edziza volcanic complex, the Spectrum Range was covered by a regional ice sheet during the Pleistocene, which receded and advanced periodically. Deglaciation from the last such cycle was essentially complete about 11,000 years ago in a steadily warming climate. This warming trend ceased about 2,600 years ago, causing glaciers to advance from the range and elsewhere along the volcanic complex as a part of the neoglaciation. The present trend towards a more moderate climate put an end to the neoglacial period in the 19th century; this has resulted in rapid glacial recession throughout the Mount Edziza volcanic complex. This rapid glacial recession is apparent from the lack of vegetation on the barren, rocky ground between the glaciers and their trim lines, which are up to 2 km (1.2 mi) apart.

Unlike Mount Edziza, whose ice cap was approximately 70 km^{2} (27 mi^{2}) in 1992, the Spectrum Range is covered with relatively small separate glaciers; they occupy cirques on most peaks greater than 2,130 m (6,990 ft) in elevation. The largest of these glaciers is Nagha Glacier, which initiates just northwest of Yeda Peak and terminates at the head of the valley between Yagi Ridge and the Kitsu Plateau. Yeda Glacier, an informally named glacier at the head of Ball Creek, existed south of Yeda Peak in 1988.

=== Drainage ===
Extending outward from the Spectrum Range is a crudely radial drainage system characterized by deeply incised valleys. This system lies within the Stikine River watershed, which includes the entire Mount Edziza volcanic complex. Kitsu Creek originating from the northern side of Kitsu Peak is unique in that it flows northwest across the Kitsu Plateau rather than through a valley. It has one named tributary, Nagha Creek, which also flows northwest from the Spectrum Range. Tadekho Creek originates from between Kuno and Yeda peaks and flows to the northwest. Kitsu and Tadekho creeks both flow into Mess Creek, which is a northwest-flowing tributary of the Stikine River.

The Little Iskut River originates from Little Ball Lake just south of Kounugu Mountain and flows to the northeast where it collects Stewbomb Creek flowing east from the range. Stewbomb Creek has one named tributary, Artifact Creek, which originates adjacent to Kitsu Peak and flows through a valley between the Artifact and Obsidian ridges. Ball and More creeks both flow south from the southern end of the range near Yeda Peak, the former of which contains an east-flowing tributary called Chachani Creek. The Little Iskut River and Ball and More creeks are tributaries of the Iskut River, which flows south and then west into the Stikine River.

== Geology ==
=== Background ===
The Spectrum Range is part of the Northern Cordilleran Volcanic Province, a broad area of volcanoes extending from northwestern British Columbia northwards through Yukon into easternmost Alaska. The dominant rocks that make up these volcanoes are alkali basalts and hawaiites, but nephelinites, basanites and peralkaline (Note: Peralkaline rocks are magmatic rocks that have a higher ratio of sodium and potassium to aluminum.) phonolites, trachytes and comendites are locally abundant. These rocks were deposited by volcanic eruptions from 20 million years ago to as recently as a few hundred years ago. Volcanism in the Northern Cordilleran Volcanic Province is thought to be due to rifting of the North American Cordillera, driven by changes in relative plate motion between the North American and Pacific plates.

=== Composition ===
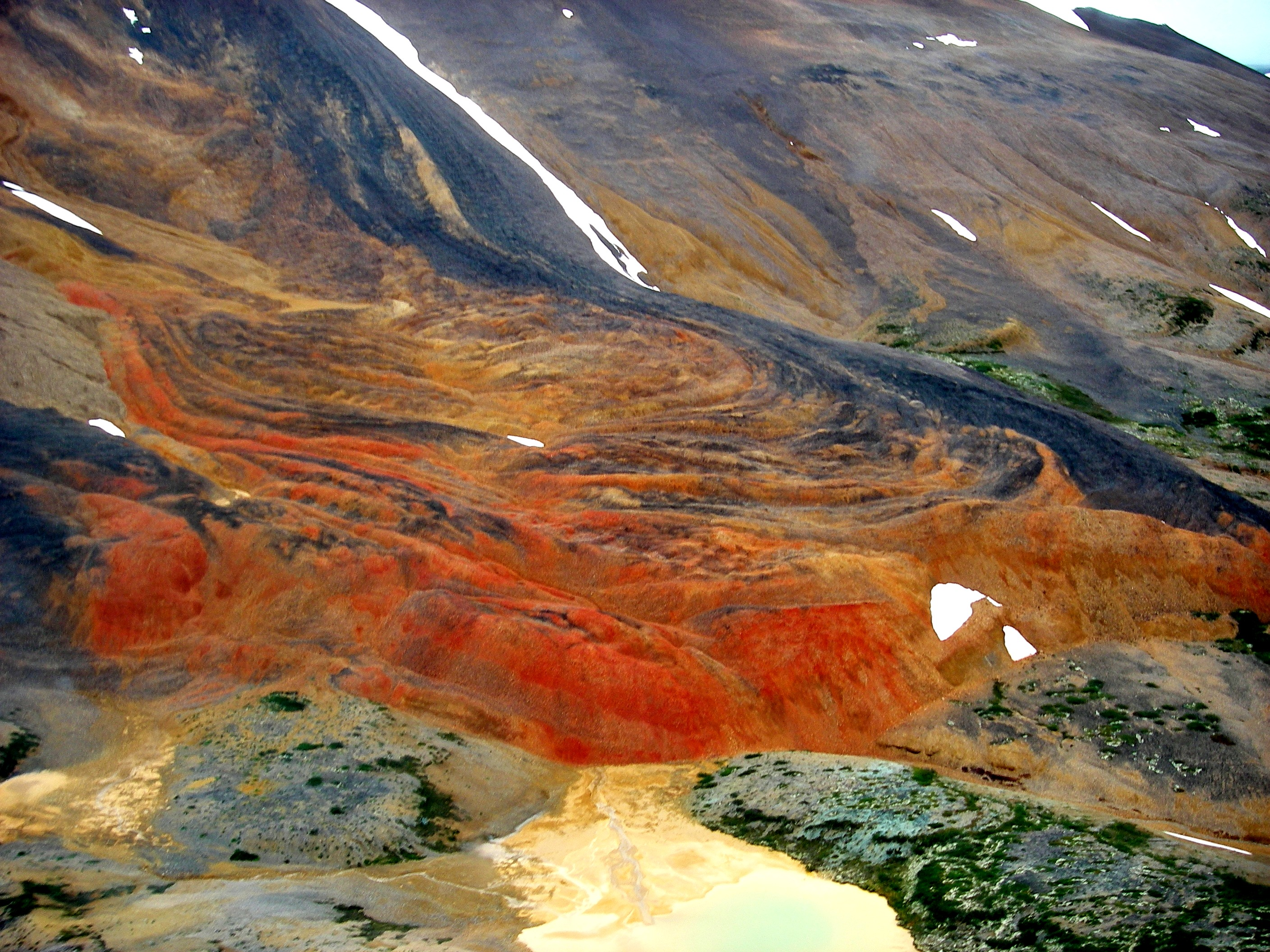
A colourful oxidized lava flow in the Spectrum Range near Raspberry Pass

The Spectrum Range consists mainly of trachyte, comendite and pantelleritic trachyte and rhyolite of the Spectrum Formation, the fifth oldest stratigraphic unit of the Mount Edziza volcanic complex. More than 90% of these volcanic rocks were erupted as lava; individual flows reach thicknesses of up to 200 m (660 ft). In contrast, less than 10% of them were erupted as pumice and pyroclastic flows. Rhyolites are the most silicic rocks; they contain up to 77% silica. The trachytes and rhyolites are overlain locally by eroded remnants of the Kitsu Member. This stratigraphic unit consists of alkali basalt flows that preserve the unmodified upper surface of the original Spectrum Dome. Obsidian Ridge contains high-quality obsidian, which was used by early Tahltan people for making stone tools.

Most of the felsic (Note: Felsic pertains to magmatic rocks that are enriched with silicon, oxygen, aluminum, sodium and potassium.) lavas forming the Spectrum Range are peralkaline. Because of their unusual major element geochemistry, peralkaline lavas can be 2–3 times less viscous than their metaluminous equivalents. There is a consensus in the scientific community that peralkaline magmas evolve from melts generated in Earth's mantle, but there is less agreement on the nature of the mantle source. The source that produces alkali basalts parental to silicic peralkaline rocks has been variously attributed to metasomatically enriched mantle, asthenospheric mantle enriched by "primitive" material from a deep mantle plume, or mantle enriched by recycled mid-ocean ridge basalt. Highly alkaline but not strictly peralkaline rhyolites are also present; they are chemically and mineralogically similar to other felsic lavas in the Spectrum Range.

=== Caldera ===
In the middle of the Spectrum Range at the base of the volcanic pile is a buried depression that may be a caldera or an irregular collapse structure. It occurs within a roughly circular area about 10 km (6.2 mi) in diameter and was likely formed by collapse of a shallow magma chamber during the eruption of the Spectrum Formation lavas. At least 1 km (0.62 mi) of vertical caldera collapse may have resulted if the magma chamber was similar in diameter to this circular area. However, the evidence is fragmentary because of poor exposure of the depression and of the bounding vertical faults. The southwestern side of a northwesterly-trending, nearly vertical fault adjacent to Stewbomb Creek has dropped at least 90 m (300 ft) and is cut by parallel rhyolite dikes.

=== Basement ===
Underlying nearly all of the Spectrum Range is the Kounugu Member of the Nido Formation, one of many stratigraphic units forming the Mount Edziza volcanic complex. Basaltic lava flows of this Pliocene-age geological member are exposed around the perimeter of the range and are limited only to the area south of the broad east–west valley of Raspberry Pass. They issued from at least four separate eruptive centres that have since been either deeply eroded or completely destroyed by erosion. These eruptive centres have been named Vanished Peak, Lost Peak, Swarm Peak and Exile Hill.

Also underlying the Spectrum Range are flat-lying basalt flows of the Raspberry Formation, the oldest stratigraphic unit of the Mount Edziza volcanic complex. This geological formation is of Late Miocene age and originated as a composite shield volcano that erupted lava from at least three locations near Raspberry Pass. The Nido and Raspberry formations are underlain by the Stikinia terrane, a Paleozoic and Mesozoic suite of volcanic and sedimentary rocks that accreted (Note: Accretion is the process by which terranes are added to a continent, resulting in continental growth.) to the continental margin of North America during the Jurassic.

=== Eruptive history ===
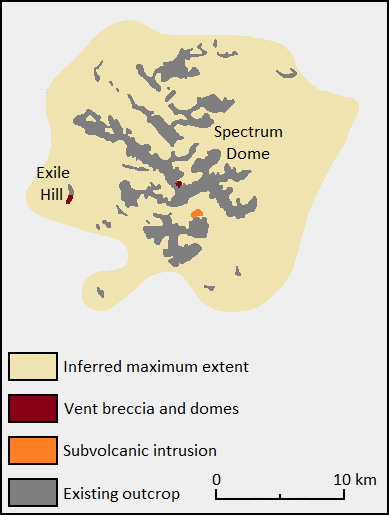
Paleogeological map of the Spectrum Formation showing the current extent of the Spectrum Dome

Most of the rocks forming the Spectrum Range were deposited by volcanic eruptions between 3.5 and 2.5 million years ago during the second magmatic cycle of the Mount Edziza volcanic complex. A relatively small initial eruption of pumice and ash was followed by the effusion of massive rhyolite flows that reached 13 km (8.1 mi) long. These rhyolite flows accumulated in rapid succession to form the broad Spectrum Dome, which reached a thickness of at least 750 m (2,460 ft) and a width of more than 25 km (16 mi). The predominantly rhyolitic eruptions were later replaced by the effusion of trachyte lava as deeper parts of the underlying magma chamber were tapped. Formation of the Spectrum Dome was followed by evacuation of the magma chamber, resulting in the formation of the caldera; this structure was eventually buried under lava from subsequent eruptions.

Yeda Peak, a 2,240 m (7,350 ft) high pinnacle in the middle of the Spectrum Range, was the site of a subsequent explosive eruption that created a crater. Some of the ejecta accumulated around the vent to form a low volcanic cone whereas the more volatile, pumice-rich phases of the eruption sent ash flows down the slopes of the Spectrum Dome. Renewed volcanism at Exile Hill 8 km (5.0 mi) west of Yeda Peak produced a similar but much smaller eruption that created a roughly 200 m (660 ft) wide breccia pipe. Late-stage volcanism also deposited the alkali basalt flows of the Kitsu Member, which likely issued from multiple eruptive centres on the dome's summit that have since been removed by erosion. These lava flows travelled over a gravel layer made up of rock fragments derived from the Spectrum Formation and older geological formations.

Following the construction of the Spectrum Dome, lesser activity continued into the Quaternary from parasitic vents in and adjacent to the Spectrum Range. Volcanism during the Pleistocene created several small volcanoes on the southwestern flank of the range that formed in subaerial and subglacial environments. Subaerial lava fountaining at the extreme northern end of the Arctic Lake Plateau created the Outcast Hill cinder cone. Its formation resulted in the damming of westerly flowing streams to create a temporary lake against its eastern side. About 4 km (2.5 mi) to the south, Tadekho Hill formed on top of a 180 m (590 ft) high remnant of Spectrum Formation trachyte and produced lava flows which spread onto the surrounding plateau surface. Subsequent subglacial volcanism near the central portion of the Arctic Lake Plateau formed the subglacial mound of Wetalth Ridge. All three Pleistocene volcanoes are basaltic in composition and are part of the Arctic Lake Formation, which formed during a period of volcanic activity 0.71 million years ago.

Volcanism during the Holocene (Note: Many geologically recent eruptions in Canada have not been radiometrically dated. Instead, a Holocene age is inferred because the volcanic deposits do not show signs of having been overridden by the Cordilleran Ice Sheet, which completely retreated about 11,000 years ago.) created subaerial cinder cones and lava flows on the northwestern and southwestern sides of the Spectrum Range, all of which are part of the Big Raven Formation. The basaltic Mess Lake Lava Field on the northwestern flank issued from three cinder cones adjacent to the edge of the Mess Creek Escarpment. Lava from the two oldest cones flowed to the west and probably cascaded over the escarpment into Mess Creek valley. The youngest cinder cone, The Ash Pit, formed at the south end of the Mess Lake Lava Field and was the source of a northeasterly-trending tephra deposit on the Kitsu Plateau. An eruption near the northern edge of the Arctic Lake Plateau created the isolated Nahta Cone on the southwestern flank of the Spectrum Range; this cone was the source of a narrow, 3 km (1.9 mi) long basaltic lava flow that travelled northward into the head of Nahta Creek. Volcanic activity on the southern flank of Kuno Peak at the southwestern end of the Spectrum Range created a cinder cone that was subsequently destroyed by landsliding. This cinder cone also produced a basaltic lava flow, but the landsliding on Kuno Peak has buried it under debris. Although volcanic activity at the Spectrum Range continued into the current Holocene epoch, the date of the last eruption is unknown.

=== Fumarolic alteration ===
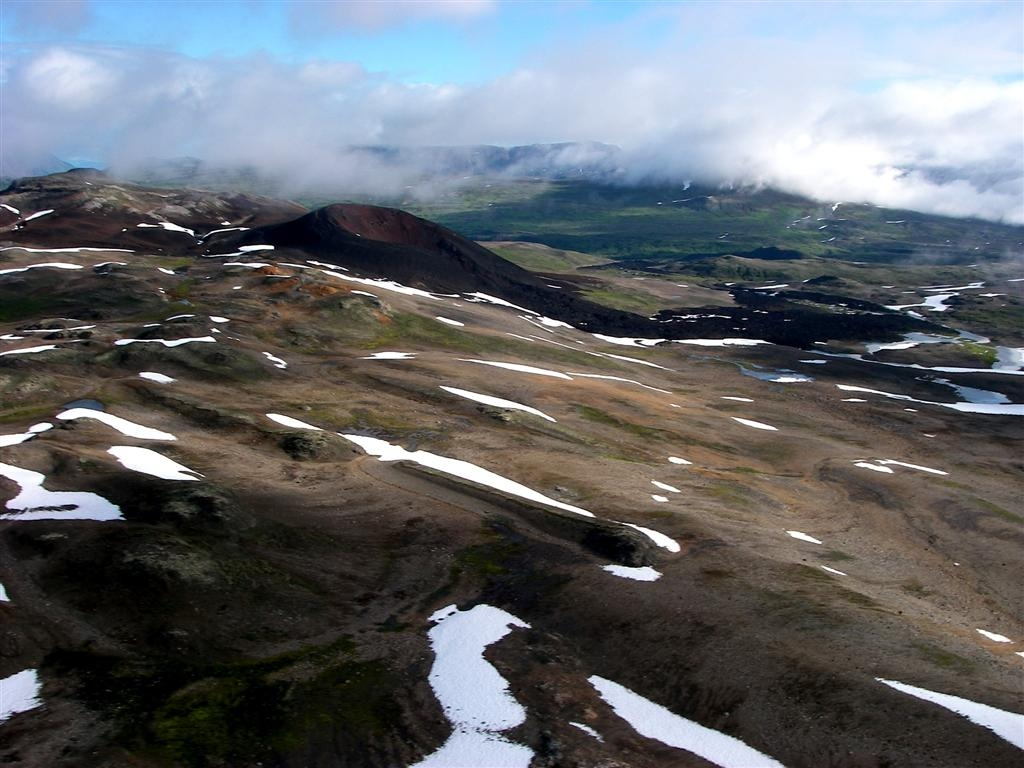
Nahta Cone with the Spectrum Range obscured by clouds in the background

Alteration of Spectrum Formation rocks caused by fumarolic activity during the formation of the Spectrum Dome occurs at Yeda Peak and elsewhere throughout the Spectrum Range. Fumarolic alteration at Yeda Peak occurs in the breccia pipe forming this peak and along adjacent fractures; it likely resulted from fumarolic activity after the explosive eruption that formed the Yeda Peak crater. Alteration elsewhere in the range was caused by fumarolic activity during the cooling and degassing of Spectrum Formation lava flows. In contrast to the fumarolic activity at Yeda Peak which was likely sourced by a deeper, hotter and longer lived hydrothermal system than elsewhere in the range, the lava flow fumaroles were small and relatively short-lived. The multi-coloured rocks which give the range its name are partially the result of fumarolic alteration.

=== Subvolcanic intrusions ===
At the head of Ball Creek valley is a subvolcanic mass of granite with abnormally high sodium content. It probably intruded into the base of the Spectrum Dome during the explosive Yeda Peak breccia pipe eruption. Lying along the edge of the hypothetical caldera or irregular collapse structure, it forms a series of glacially rounded bluffs along the southwestern side of Ball Creek valley. The granite forming this subvolcanic intrusion is lustrous brown and medium to coarse-grained. It consists mostly of feldspar that is locally covered with iron and manganese oxides.

== Accessibility ==
The Spectrum Range can be accessed via charter aircraft from Dease Lake and Tatogga Lake, the latter of which is near the community of Iskut. Lakes large enough to be used by float-equipped aircraft include Mess Lake to the northwest, the 180 and Little Ball lakes to the southeast, and the Arctic and Little Arctic lakes to the south. Landing on the Little Arctic and Little Ball lakes with a private aircraft requires a letter of authorization from the BC Parks Stikine Senior Park Ranger. Alpine Lakes Air and BC Yukon Air are the only air charter companies permitted to provide access to this area via aircraft. Private aircraft are prohibited from landing on the neighbouring Kitsu Plateau lava flows.

== See also ==
- List of mountain ranges of Canada
