= Little Iskut River =

- Mouth of Little Iskut River

Location
- Country: Canada
- Province: British Columbia
- District: Cassiar Land District

Physical characteristics
- Source: Little Ball Lake
  - location: Spectrum Range
  - coordinates: 57°20′55″N 130°35′20″W
  - elevation: 1,500 m (4,900 ft)
- Mouth: Iskut River
  - location: Tahltan Highland
  - coordinates: 57°26′55″N 130°16′7″W
  - elevation: 740 m (2,430 ft)
- Length: 45 km (28 mi)
- Basin size: 453 km^{2} (175 sq mi),
- Discharge
  - average: 12.8 m^{3}/s (450 cu ft/s)

Basin features
- Topo map: NTS 104G8 Refuge Lake; NTS 104G9 Kinaskan Lake; NTS 104G10 Mount Edziza; NTS 104G7 Mess Lake

The Little Iskut River is a tributary of the Iskut River in the northwest part of the province of British Columbia, Canada, in Cassiar Land District. From its source at Little Ball Lake in Mount Edziza Provincial Park, the Little Iskut River flows about 45 km (28 mi), generally north to the vicinity of Mowdale Lake, then southeast and south to the Iskut River just below Cascade Falls. The Little Iskut River is part of the Stikine River drainage basin, as the Iskut River is a major tributary of the Stikine.

The Little Iskut River's watershed covers 453 km^{2} (175 sq mi) and its mean annual discharge is an estimated 12.8 m^{3}/s (450 cu ft/s). The river's watershed's land cover is classified as 36.8% conifer forest, 27.9% barren, 17.3% shrubland, 10.3% herbaceous, and small amounts of other cover.

The mouth of the Little Iskut River is located about 73 km (45 mi) southeast of Telegraph Creek, British Columbia, about 110 km (68 mi) south of Dease Lake, and about 165 km (103 mi) northeast of Wrangell, Alaska.

The Little Iskut River is in the asserted traditional territory of the Tahltan First Nation and Iskut First Nation, of the Tahltan people.

== Geography ==
The Little Iskut River originates at Little Ball Lake just south of Kounugu Mountain. It flows northeast through the southern part of Mount Edziza Provincial Park, then north, forming the southeastern boundary of the park. It collects tributary streams flowing east from the Spectrum Range. Stewbomb Creek and its tributary Artifact Creek flow from Obsidian Ridge, Artifact Ridge, and high mountains including Yeda Peak and Kitsu Peak. Bourgeaux Creek and its tributary Gerlib Creek also flow east from the Spectrum Range, Artifact Ridge, and high peaks including Tadeda Peak and Armadillo Peak.

Between Stewbomb Creek and Bourgeaux Creek the historic Yukon Telegraph Trail crosses the Little Iskut River, following Bourgeaux Creek over Raspberry Pass to Mess Creek, continuing north along the western side of the Mount Edziza volcanic complex to Telegraph Creek on the Stikine River. After Bourgeaux Creek, near Mowdade Lake, the Little Iskut turns sharply to flow southeast. It empties into the Iskut River just downstream of Cascade Falls.

The Little Iskut River is a major tributary of the Iskut River. About 5% of its watershed is glacier-covered. Much of the lower Little Iskut River is braided.

== Geology ==
During the Miocene epoch, a series of lava flows from the adjacent Mount Edziza volcanic complex travelled east into the Little Iskut River. Here, the flows formed a lava dam behind which water ponded to form Raspberry Lake. Water discharging from this prehistoric lake eventually cut through the eastern edge of this dam to create a new course for the Little Iskut River.

== See also ==
- List of rivers of British Columbia
- Little Iskut Formation
