= Nagha Creek =

Tribuatary river in the country of Canada

- Mouth of Nagha Creek

Location
- Country: Canada
- Province: British Columbia
- District: Cassiar Land District

Physical characteristics
- Source: Kitsu Peak
  - location: Spectrum Range
  - coordinates: 57°24′59″N 130°43′0″W
  - elevation: 1,800 m (5,900 ft)
- Mouth: Kitsu Creek
  - coordinates: 57°30′21″N 130°51′21″W
  - elevation: 690 m (2,260 ft)
- Length: 15 km (9.3 mi)
- Basin size: 46.6 km^{2} (18.0 sq mi)
- Discharge
  - average: 1.43 m^{3}/s (50 cu ft/s)

Basin features
- Topo map: NTS 104G10 Mount Edziza

Nagha Creek is a tributary of Kitsu Creek and part of the Stikine River watershed in northwest part of the province of British Columbia, Canada. It flows generally northwest and north for roughly 15 km (9.3 mi) to join Kitsu Creek, a tributary of Mess Creek, which in turn is a tributary of the Stikine River.

Nagha Creek's mean annual discharge is estimated at 1.43 m^{3}/s (50 cu ft/s). Its watershed covers 46.6 km^{2} (18.0 sq mi) and is entirely in Mount Edziza Provincial Park. The watershed's land cover is classified as 38.5% barren, 29.8% conifer forest, 13.4% shrubland, 11.9% snow/glacier, 5.5% herbaceous, and small amounts of other cover.

The mouth of Nagha Creek is located about 48 km (30 mi) south of Telegraph Creek, British Columbia, about 115 km (71 mi) southwest of Dease Lake, British Columbia, and about 228 km (142 mi) southeast of Juneau, Alaska.

Nagha Creek is in Mount Edziza Provincial Park, which lies within the traditional territory of the Tahltan First Nation, of the Tahltan people.

The name "Nagha" comes from a Tahltan word for wolverine. According to BC Geographical Names, the creek was named "Nagha" because during time of survey a wolverine frequently visited a sheep carcass on the ice near the surveying party.

== Geography ==
Nagha Creek originates from Nagha Glacier near Kitsu Peak and Yeda Peak in the Spectrum Range, about 33 km (21 mi) south of Mount Edziza.

From its source, Nagha Creek flows between Yagi Ridge, to the south, and the Kitsu Plateau, to the north. It then flows through conifer forests to join Kitsu Creek near Mess Lake. After its confluence with Nagha Creek, Kitsu Creek flows about 1 km (0.62 mi) before emptying into Mess Creek. Nagha Creek's watershed is in the southern part of the Mount Edziza volcanic complex.

The steep, south-facing side of Nagha Creek contains a conical, 60 m-deep (200 ft) and 400 m-in diameter (1,300 ft) volcanic crater called The Ash Pit. This is the youngest and southernmost volcanic vent in the Mess Lake Lava Field, as well as possibly the youngest volcanic feature in the entire Mount Edziza volcanic complex.

== See also ==
- List of rivers of British Columbia
