= Kounugu Mountain =

Mountain in British Columbia, Canada

- Location within British Columbia
- Interactive map of Kounugu Mountain

Highest point
- Elevation: 2,267 m (7,438 ft)
- Coordinates: 57°21′50″N 130°35′54″W

Geography
- Country: Canada
- Province: British Columbia
- District: Cassiar Land District
- Parent range: Spectrum Range
- Topo map: NTS 104G7 Mess Lake

Geology
- Rock age: Pliocene age
- Rock type: Rhyolite

Kounugu Mountain is a mountain in the Spectrum Range at the southern end of the Mount Edziza volcanic complex in northwestern British Columbia, Canada. It is southeast of Yeda Peak, west and northwest of the Little Iskut River, south of Stewbomb Creek valley and just north of Little Ball Lake. It has an elevation of 2,267 metres (7,438 feet) and lies at the southeastern end of the Spectrum Range. The mountain is also at the southeastern end of Mount Edziza Provincial Park which is southeast of the community of Telegraph Creek.

== Name and etymology ==
The name of the mountain became official on January 2, 1980, after being submitted to the BC Geographical Names office by the Geological Survey of Canada. Kounugu was the guardian of fresh water in Tahltan folklore "who slept throughout the day on top of the well that contained his treasure". Kounugu Mountain is the namesake of the Kounugu Member, a geological member of the Nido Formation which is a geological formation of the Mount Edziza volcanic complex.

== Geology ==
The base of Kounugu Mountain consists of basaltic lava flows of the Kounugu Member which erupted from multiple volcanoes during the Pliocene epoch. These lava flows are overlain directly by rhyolite of the Spectrum Formation which comprises the bulk of Kounugu Mountain. The Spectrum Formation is the eroded remains of a large Pliocene lava dome that forms the current pyramidal peaks and ridges of the Spectrum Range.

== See also ==
- Volcanism of the Mount Edziza volcanic complex
