= Kitsu Peak =

Mountain in British Columbia, Canada

- Location within British Columbia
- Interactive map of Kitsu Peak

Highest point
- Elevation: 2,430 m (7,970 ft)
- Coordinates: 57°25′25″N 130°41′24″W

Geography
- Country: Canada
- Province: British Columbia
- District: Cassiar Land District
- Parent range: Spectrum Range
- Topo map: NTS 104G7 Mess Lake

Geology
- Rock age: Pliocene age

Kitsu Peak is the highest summit of the Spectrum Range at the southern end of the Mount Edziza volcanic complex in northwestern British Columbia, Canada. It is bounded on the west by Nagha Creek valley, on the northwest by the Kitsu Plateau, on the northeast by Obsidian Ridge, on the east by Stewbomb Creek valley and on the southwest by Nagha Glacier and Yagi Ridge. It has an elevation of 2,430 metres (7,970 feet) and lies at the northern end of the Spectrum Range.

Kitsu Peak is at the southern end of Mount Edziza Provincial Park and was likely named in association with Kitsu Creek and the Kitsu Plateau; Kitsu means Northern Lights in the Tahltan language. The name of the peak became official on January 2, 1980, after being submitted to the BC Geographical Names office by the Geological Survey of Canada.

== Geology ==
Kitsu Peak is formed mainly of Pliocene volcanic rocks of the Spectrum Formation which consists of comendite, pantellerite and pantelleritic trachyte. These rocks are in the form of lava flows as well as minor breccia and ash flow deposits. The Spectrum Formation is the eroded remains of a large lava dome that forms the current pyramidal peaks and ridges of the Spectrum Range. Truncated remnants of thick, gently dipping trachyte flows at the summit of Kitsu Peak indicate that the summit of the original dome was higher in elevation than it is today.

== See also ==
- Volcanism of the Mount Edziza volcanic complex
