= Nahta Cone =

Cinder cone in British Columbia, Canada

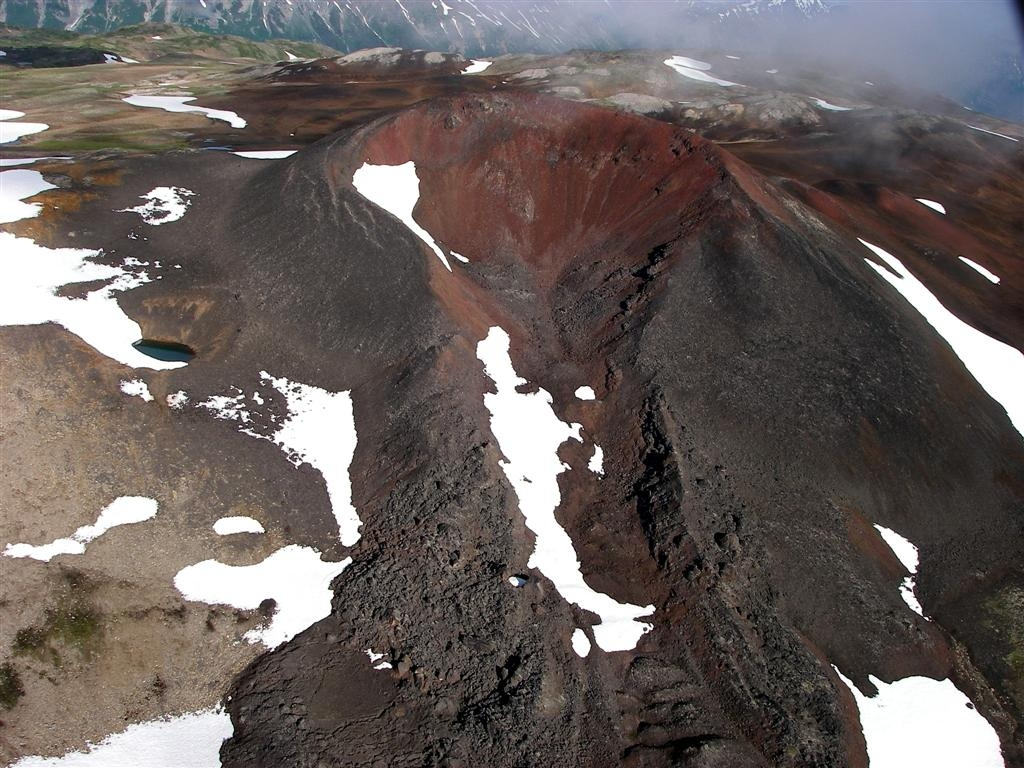
- Nahta Cone from the east

Highest point
- Elevation: 1,670 m (5,480 ft)
- Coordinates: 57°18′29″N 130°49′13″W

Naming
- Etymology: 'Seven' in the Tahltan language

Geography
- Location in British Columbia
- Location in Mount Edziza Provincial Park
- Country: Canada
- Province: British Columbia
- District: Cassiar Land District
- Protected area: Mount Edziza Provincial Park
- Parent range: Tahltan Highland
- Topo map: NTS 104G7 Mess Lake

Geology
- Formed by: Volcanism
- Mountain type: Cinder cone
- Rock type: Hawaiite
- Last eruption: Holocene age

Nahta Cone is a small cinder cone in Cassiar Land District of northwestern British Columbia, Canada. It has an elevation of 1,670 metres (5,480 feet) and lies near the northern edge of the Arctic Lake Plateau, a glacially scored plateau of the Tahltan Highland which in turn extends along the western side of the Stikine Plateau. The cone is about 70 kilometres (43 miles) south-southeast of the community of Telegraph Creek and lies in the southwestern corner of Mount Edziza Provincial Park, one of the largest provincial parks in British Columbia.

Nahta Cone is a part of the Mount Edziza volcanic complex and overlies a limestone hill. The summit of the cone contains a circular crater breached on the east which was the source of a roughly 3 km (1.9 mi) long lava flow that travelled northerly and then westerly into the head of Nahta Creek. Ejecta from the volcano extends about 500 m (1,600 ft) to the west and 700 m (2,300 ft) to the north. Access to this isolated volcanic cone is limited to float plane or helicopter.

== Geography ==
Nahta Cone is located in Cassiar Land District of northwestern British Columbia, Canada, near the northern edge of the Arctic Lake Plateau. It has an elevation of 1,670 m (5,480 ft) and rises about 60 m (200 ft) above the glacially scored surface of the plateau to a circular crater breached on the east. The cone is surrounded by Mess Creek valley to the west, Wetalth Ridge and Little Arctic Lake to the east, Tadekho Hill to the northeast, Exile Hill to the north and Arctic Lake to the south. Between Nahta Cone and Tadekho Hill is Nahta Creek which flows west through a valley into Mess Creek, a northwest-flowing tributary of the Stikine River.

Nahta Cone lies in the southwestern corner of Mount Edziza Provincial Park about 70 km (43 mi) south-southeast of the community of Telegraph Creek. With an area of 2,661.8 km^{2} (1,027.7 mi^{2}), Mount Edziza Provincial Park is one of the largest provincial parks in British Columbia and was established in 1972 to preserve the volcanic landscape. It also includes the Spectrum Range to the northeast and Mount Edziza further to the north which are separated by the broad east–west valley of Raspberry Pass. Mount Edziza Provincial Park is in the Tahltan Highland, a southeast-trending upland area extending along the western side of the Stikine Plateau.

== Geology ==
Nahta Cone is the southernmost cinder cone of the Big Raven Formation, the youngest and least voluminous geological formation of the Mount Edziza volcanic complex. It formed on top of a limestone hill that overlies a contact between Early Devonian granitic rocks and Early Carboniferous volcanic rocks of the Stikine Assemblage, the oldest exposed stratified rocks of the Stikinia terrane which accreted to the continental margin of North America during the Jurassic. Five tiny hawaiite conelets consisting of black and brick-red scoria blocks comprise Nahta Cone; the hawaiite contains phenocrysts of olivine and plagioclase. Nahta Cone is somewhat older than The Ash Pit in the Mess Lake Lava Field which may be the youngest cinder cone of the Mount Edziza volcanic complex.

Nahta Cone was the source of air-fall tephra and a roughly 3 km (1.9 mi) long lava flow which extends northerly and then westerly into the head of Nahta Creek. The air-fall tephra is lapilli-sized and distributed about 500 m (1,600 ft) west and 700 m (2,300 ft) north of the cone, suggesting that the volcano was volcanically active at least twice during different wind conditions. Erosion has unmodified the blocky surface of the lava flow, but Nahta Creek at its distal end has begun to etch a new channel where it displaced the stream. Canadian volcanologist Jack Souther obtained a radiocarbon date of 1,340 years from the lava flow in 1970.

== Name and etymology ==
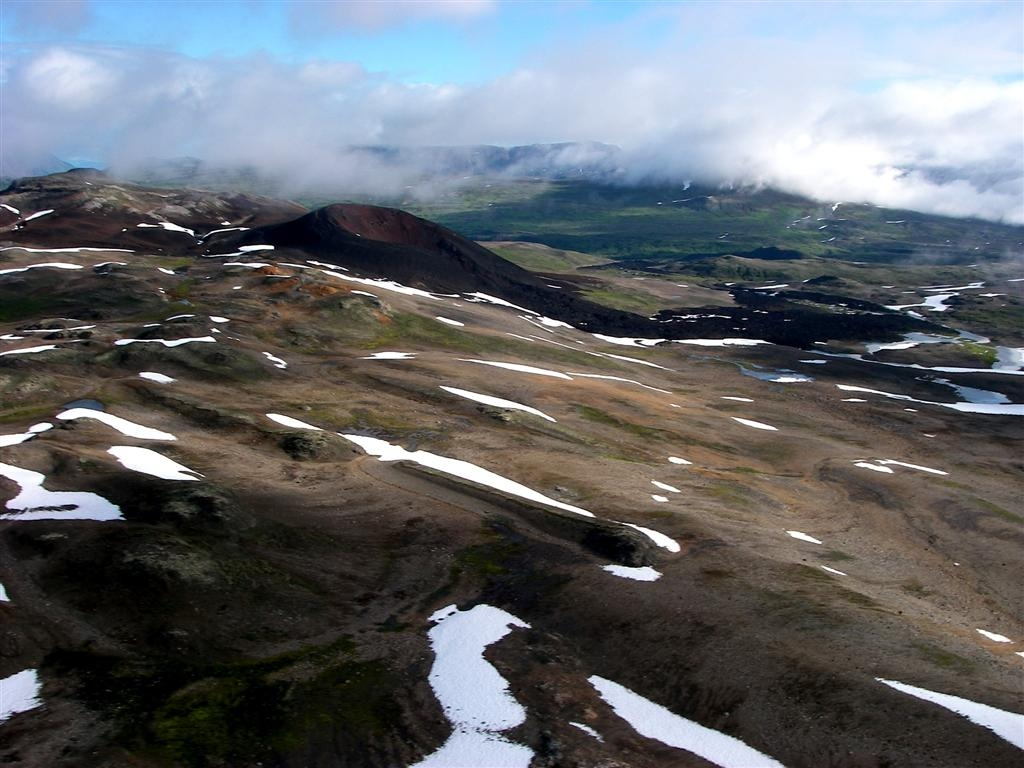
Nahta Cone and lava flow from the southeast with the Spectrum Range obscured by clouds in the background

Nahta Cone was officially named on January 2, 1980. Its name was adopted on the National Topographic System map 104G/7 after being submitted to the BC Geographical Names office by the Geological Survey of Canada. Nahta means 'seven' in the Tahltan language, referring to the last seven survivors of the Wetalth people who were outcast or exiled from the Tahltans in times past. Several other features on the Arctic Lake Plateau such as Wetalth Ridge, Outcast Hill, Exile Hill and Tadekho Hill also have names with Tahltan roots that were adopted on January 2, 1980. In his 1992 report The Late Cenozoic Mount Edziza Volcanic Complex, British Columbia, Jack Souther gave Nahta Cone the numeronym AL-1.

== Accessibility ==
Nahta Cone can be accessed via charter aircraft from Dease Lake and Tatogga Lake, the latter of which is near the community of Iskut. Private aircraft are prohibited from landing on the neighbouring Kitsu Plateau lava flows. Arctic Lake about 7 km (4.3 mi) south of Natha Cone and Little Arctic Lake about 3 km (1.9 mi) east of Nahta Cone are large enough to be used by float-equipped aircraft. Landing on Little Arctic Lake with a private aircraft requires a letter of authorization from the BC Parks Stikine Senior Park Ranger. Alpine Lakes Air and BC Yukon Air are the only air charter companies permitted to provide access to this area via aircraft.

== See also ==
- List of volcanoes in Canada
- List of Northern Cordilleran volcanoes
- Volcanism of the Mount Edziza volcanic complex
