= Yagi Ridge =

Mountain ridge in the country of Canada

- Location within British Columbia

Highest point
- Elevation: 2,243 m (7,359 ft)
- Coordinates: 57°23′53.06″N 130°41′51.26″W

Geography
- Country: Canada
- Province: British Columbia
- District: Cassiar Land District
- Parent range: Spectrum Range
- Topo map: NTS 104G7 Mess Lake

Yagi Ridge is a mountain ridge extending northwest from the middle of the Spectrum Range at the southern end of the Mount Edziza volcanic complex in northwestern British Columbia, Canada. It is bounded on the north by Nagha Glacier and Nagha Creek valley, on the south by Yeda Creek on the Arctic Lake Plateau and on the west by Mess Creek valley. Yagi Ridge reaches an elevation of 2,243 metres (7,359 feet) at the head of Nagha Glacier where its eastern end adjoins to the Spectrum Range just northwest of Yeda Peak.

The ridge is at the southern end of Mount Edziza Provincial Park and is named after Kenzō Yagi, a Japanese volcanologist who traversed it with Canadian volcanologist Jack Souther during a visit to Canada in 1966. Yagi also means mountain goat in the Japanese language which exist in abundance around the ridge.

== Geology ==
The base of Yagi Ridge is covered with glacial, talus and landslide deposits. The oldest rocks comprising the ridge are Miocene alkali basalt flows of the Raspberry Formation which are exposed on its southwestern side. Overlying the Raspberry Formation are Pliocene alkali basalt flows of the Kounugu Member of the Nido Formation which are exposed on the western and southwestern sides of Yagi Ridge. The dominant rocks comprising Yagi Ridge are Pliocene comendite, pantellerite and pantelleritic trachyte of the Spectrum Formation which are mainly in the form of lava domes and lava flows; hydrothermally altered vent breccia overlies these volcanic rocks locally.

== See also ==
- Volcanism of the Mount Edziza volcanic complex
