= Artifact Creek =

Tribuatary river in the country of Canada

- Mouth of Artifact Creek

Location
- Country: Canada
- Province: British Columbia
- District: Cassiar Land District

Physical characteristics
- Source: Near Kitsu Peak
  - location: Spectrum Range
  - coordinates: 57°26′50″N 130°41′12″W
  - elevation: 1,875 m (6,152 ft)
- Mouth: Stewbomb Creek
  - coordinates: 57°25′17″N 130°31′52″W
  - elevation: 1,140 m (3,740 ft)
- Length: 13 km (8.1 mi)
- Basin size: 42.5 km^{2} (16.4 sq mi)
- Discharge
  - average: 1.62 m^{3}/s (57 cu ft/s)

Basin features
- Topo map: NTS 104G7 Mess Lake

Artifact Creek is a tributary of Stewbomb Creek and part of the Stikine River watershed in northwest part of the province of British Columbia, Canada. It flows generally southeast for roughly 13 km (8.1 mi) to join Stewbomb Creek, which flows into the Little Iskut River. In turn the Little Iskut River flows to the Iskut River, the largest tributary of the Stikine River.

Artifact Creek's watershed covers 42.5 km^{2} (16.4 sq mi) and is entirely in Mount Edziza Provincial Park. The creek's mean annual discharge is estimated at 1.62 m^{3}/s (57 cu ft/s).

The mouth of Artifact Creek is located about 65 km (40 mi) southeast of Telegraph Creek, British Columbia, about 118 km (73 mi) south of Dease Lake, British Columbia, and about 250 km (160 mi) southeast of Juneau, Alaska. Artifact Creek's watershed's land cover is classified as 51.4% barren, 15.3% shrubland, 14.5% herbaceous, 10.3% conifer forest, 8.2% snow/glacier, and small amounts of other cover.

Artifact Creek is in Mount Edziza Provincial Park, which lies within the traditional territory of the Tahltan First Nation, of the Tahltan people.

The name of Artifact Creek and nearby Artifact Ridge and Obsidian Ridge comes from the abundant piles of stone chips left from the knapping of obsidian tools and points by early Tahltan hunters.

== Geography ==
Artifact Creek originates near Kitsu Peak, about 30 km (19 mi) south of Mount Edziza. It flows east and southeast between Obsidian Ridge to the south and Artifact Ridge to the north. It collects various small unnamed tributary streams before emptying into Stewbomb Creek about 3 km (1.9 mi) upstream from Stewbomb's confluence with the Little Iskut River.

== Geology ==
The north side of Artifact Creek is bounded by a 180 m-thick (590 ft) sequence of lava flows belonging to the Armadillo Formation of the Mount Edziza volcanic complex. A single 9 m-thick (30 ft) ash flow deposit also belonging to the Armadillo Formation is exposed on the south side of Artifact Creek. Along the north side of Artifact Creek are two poorly exposed, low, northeasterly trending ridges of trachybasalt that may be intrusions linked to the Little Iskut conduit system.

== See also ==
- List of rivers of British Columbia
