= Mount Edziza volcanic complex =

Volcanic complex in British Columbia, Canada

- Mount Edziza–Spectrum Range complex
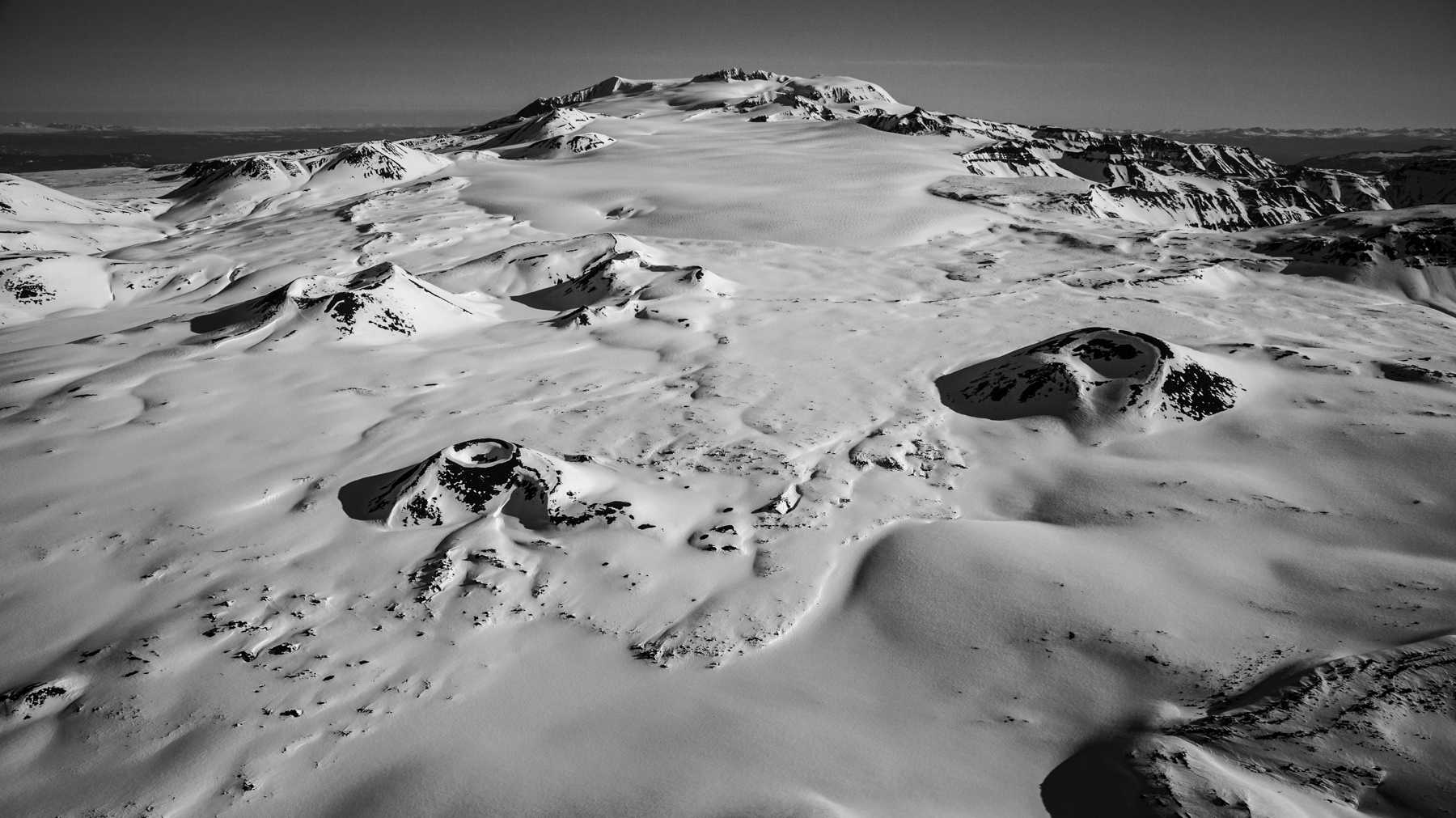
- The northern half of the MEVC as seen from the southern end of the Big Raven Plateau. Coffee Crater is at left centre whereas Ice Peak and Mount Edziza itself are at upper right centre and at upper centre, respectively.

Highest point
- Peak: Mount Edziza
- Elevation: 2,786 m (9,140 ft)
- Coordinates: 57°42′55″N 130°38′04″W

Dimensions
- Length: 65 km (40 mi)
- Width: 20 km (12 mi)
- Area: 1,000 km^{2} (390 mi^{2})
- Volume: 665 km^{3} (160 mi^{3})

Geography
- Location in British Columbia
- Location in Mount Edziza Provincial Park
- Country: Canada
- Province: British Columbia
- District: Cassiar Land District
- Protected area: Mount Edziza Provincial Park
- Range coordinates: 57°30′N 130°36′W
- Parent range: Tahltan Highland
- Topo map(s): NTS 104G15 Buckley Lake; NTS 104G10 Mount Edziza; NTS 104G7 Mess Lake

Geology
- Formed by: Volcanism
- Rock age: 7.4 Ma to less than 20 ka
- Rock type(s): Basalt, trachybasalt, trachyte, tristanite, rhyolite, mugearite, benmoreite
- Volcanic zone: Northern Cordilleran Province
- Last eruption: Unknown

The Mount Edziza volcanic complex (/ədˈzaɪzə/ əd-ZY-zə; abbreviated MEVC) is a group of volcanoes and associated lava flows in northwestern British Columbia, Canada. Located on the Tahltan Highland, it is 40 kilometres (25 miles) southeast of Telegraph Creek and 85 km (53 mi) southwest of Dease Lake. The complex encompasses a broad, steep-sided lava plateau that extends over 1,000 km^{2} (390 mi^{2}). Its highest summit is 2,786 metres (9,140 feet) in elevation, making the MEVC the highest of four large complexes in an extensive north–south trending volcanic region. It is obscured by an ice cap characterized by several outlet glaciers that stretch out to lower altitudes.

The MEVC consists of several types of volcanoes, including stratovolcanoes, shield volcanoes, cinder cones and lava domes. These volcanoes have formed over the last 7.5 million years during five cycles of magmatic activity which spanned four geologic epochs. Volcanic eruptions during these magmatic cycles produced a wide variety of volcanic rocks that compose 13 geological formations. The most recent eruptions took place in the last 11,000 years but none of them have been precisely dated. Current activity occurs exclusively in the form of hot springs which exist along the western side of the volcanic complex. Future eruptions are likely to impact local streams and cause wildfires.

Several streams surround the MEVC, many of which drain the flanks of the volcanic complex. They include the Little Iskut River along the southeastern flank, Kakiddi Creek along the northeastern flank, the Klastline River along the northern flank and Mess Creek along the western flank. The valleys of these streams contain several species of trees, including white spruce, trembling aspen and lodgepole pine. Animal species such as birds, rodents, bears, sheep, goats, moose and caribou inhabit the area. Warm summers and cold, snowy winters characterize the climate at the MEVC; snow and ice remain on the highest volcanoes year-round.

Indigenous peoples have lived adjacent to the MEVC for thousands of years. Historically, the local Tahltan people used volcanic glass from the MEVC to make tools and weaponry. Intermittent geological work has been carried out at the volcanic complex since at least the 1950s, the most detailed studies having been conducted in the 1960s. A large provincial park, which can only be accessed by aircraft or by a network of horse trails, dominates the MEVC.

== Names and etymology ==
The Mount Edziza volcanic complex is sometimes referred to as the Mount Edziza–Spectrum Range complex or the Mount Edziza Plateau. Stratigraphically, it has also been referred to as the Mount Edziza Group or the Edziza Group. A number of explanations have been made regarding the origin of the name Edziza. A 1927 report by J. Davidson of the British Columbia Land Surveyors claims that Edziza means "sand" in the Tahltan language, referring to the deep volcanic ash deposits or pumice-like sand covering large portions of the Big Raven Plateau around Mount Edziza. According to David Stevenson of University of Victoria's Anthropology Department, "sand" or "dust" is instead translated as "kutlves" in the Tahltan language. An explanation listed in the BC Parks brochure is that Edziza means "cinders" in the Tahltan language. Another explanation proposed by Canadian volcanologist Jack Souther is that Edziza is a corruption of Edzerza, the name of a local Tahltan family.

== Geography and geomorphology ==
=== Structure ===
The geomorphology of the MEVC is in some ways similar to that of the Eyjafjallajökull volcano in Iceland. This includes its overall elongated structure, its flanking basaltic lava fields and its summit ice cap surrounded by silica-rich volcanic rocks. The elongated structure of the MEVC is about 65 km (40 mi) long and 20 km (12 mi) wide. It forms a broad, steep-sided, intermontane plateau that rises from a base elevation of 760 or 816 m (2,500 or 2,675 ft). Its sides tower 760 m (2,500 ft) above adjacent valleys that serve as drainageways for several streams. The edges of the plateau have been deeply incised by creeks that flow eastward and westward into Mess Creek, Kakiddi Creek and the Iskut River. A northerly-trending, elliptical, composite shield volcano consisting of multiple flat-lying lava flows forms the plateau.

=== Location ===
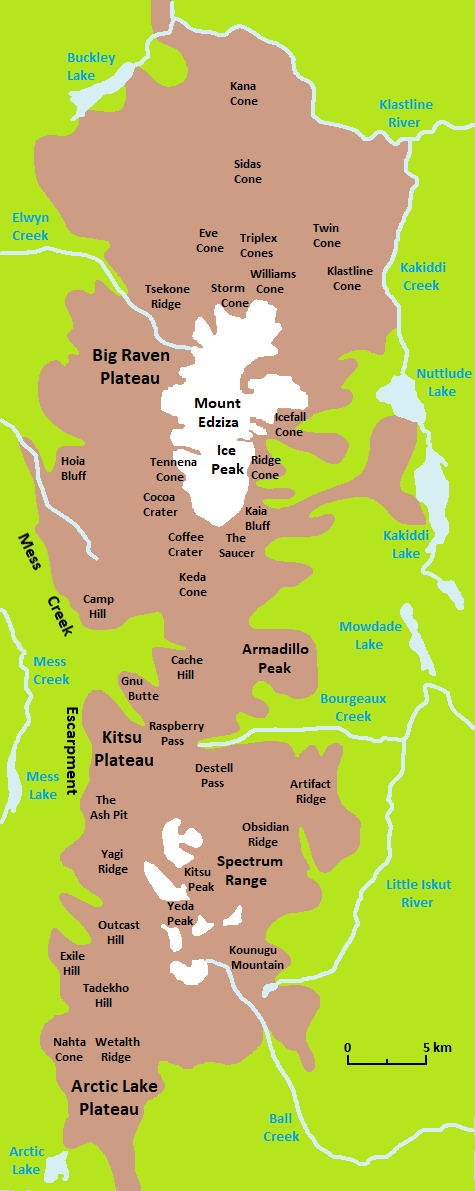
Map of the MEVC showing many of its features

The MEVC is surrounded on the east by the Skeena Mountains and the Klastline Plateau whereas to the west it is flanked by the Coast Mountains. It lies on the eastern edge of the Tahltan Highland, a southeast-trending upland area extending along the western side of the Stikine Plateau between the Boundary Ranges in the west and the head of the Iskut River in the east. The width of the Tahltan Highland varies from about 8 km (5.0 mi) in the north to about 48 km (30 mi) in the south where the Stikine River crosses the highland.

The MEVC is in the Southern Boreal Plateau Ecosection which consists of several upland summits as well as wide river valleys and deeply incised plateaus. It is one of seven ecosections composing the Boreal Mountains and Plateaus Ecoregion, a large ecological region of northwestern British Columbia encompassing high plateaus and rugged mountains with intervening lowlands. Boreal forests of black and white spruce occur in the lowlands and valley bottoms of this ecoregion whereas birch, spruce and willow form forests on the mid-slopes. Extensive alpine altai fescue covers the upper slopes but barren rock is abundant at higher elevations.

=== Landforms ===
Four central volcanoes dominate the MEVC, Mount Edziza being the highest with an elevation of 2,786 metres (9,140 feet). It is a large ice-covered stratovolcano rising well above the general level of the Tahltan Highland. Ice Peak is a composite stratovolcano 2,500 m (8,200 ft) in elevation that has been reduced to a steep-walled pyramidal peak with active cirques on all of its sides. The Spectrum Range has an elevation of 2,430 m (7,970 ft) and consists of a nearly circular, more than 10 km (6.2 mi) wide dome with a thickness of up to 650 m (2,130 ft). Armadillo Peak represents the eroded remains of a small caldera whose 2,194 m (7,198 ft) summit is capped by a 180 m (590 ft) thick sequence of ponded lava flows. Various stages of erosion have modified these central volcanoes; in some cases, only a few small remnants of their original surface remain. The degree of erosion becomes less pronounced on those that have more recently formed.

Several cinder cones dotting the plateau surface rise up to 460 m (1,500 ft) above the surrounding terrain, most of which occur in three lava fields. The Desolation Lava Field on the northern slope of Mount Edziza contains the Eve, Storm, Moraine, Williams, Sleet, Twin, Sidas and Triplex cones. Five named cones occur in the Snowshoe Lava Field on the southwestern flank of Ice Peak: Tennena Cone, Coffee Crater, Keda Cone, Cocoa Crater and The Saucer. The Ash Pit is the only named cinder cone in the Mess Lake Lava Field, which lies at the south-central end of the MEVC. Isolated cinder cones include Nahta Cone at the extreme southern end of the MEVC, Kana Cone on the extreme northern flank of the MEVC, two unnamed cones in Walkout Creek valley and the Icefall and Ridge cones on the eastern slope of Mount Edziza.

The MEVC contains three named subplateaus, the largest and northernmost of which is the Big Raven Plateau. Its dominant feature is Mount Edziza which rises from within the middle of the plateau. Two lava fields are present on the Big Raven Plateau; the Desolation Lava Field at the northern end of the plateau covers more than 150 km^{2} (58 mi^{2}) whereas the Snowshoe Lava Field covers about 40 km^{2} (15 mi^{2}) at the southern end of the plateau. At the northwestern end of the Spectrum Range is the Kitsu Plateau; its dominant feature is the even smaller Mess Lake Lava Field which covers 18 km^{2} (6.9 mi^{2}). The Arctic Lake Plateau is the southernmost of the three subplateaus; it consists of a nearly flat upland containing Wetalth Ridge, Nahta Cone and the Outcast, Tadekho, Source, Thaw and Exile hills.

In the north fork of Tenchen Creek is Cinder Cliff, a 210 m (690 ft) high barrier of volcanic rocks. The Koosick and Ornostay bluffs are just southwest of Mount Edziza near the head of Sezill Creek. Northwest and east of Coffee Crater are the Hoia and Kaia bluffs, respectively. Hoia Bluff is a prominent west-facing cliff whereas Kaia Bluff is a steep-sided hill. On the northwestern side of Raspberry Pass is an isolated, flat-topped hill with steep sides called Gnu Butte. The Mess Creek Escarpment is a long, often cliff-like feature forming the western edge of the MEVC. It runs along the eastern side of Mess Creek and exposes thick, flat-lying lava flows. Artifact Ridge is a crescent-shaped mountain ridge east of the Kitsu Plateau and just north of Artifact Creek. Just south of Artifact Ridge and Artifact Creek is Obsidian Ridge, a mountain ridge containing high-quality obsidian.

Destell Pass is a narrow rock cleft northwest of Artifact Ridge that provides access between the broad upland valleys of Artifact and Raspberry creeks. It is one of two named mountain passes in the MEVC, the other being Raspberry Pass between the heads of Bourgeaux and Raspberry creeks. Raspberry Pass is a broad east–west valley separating the Spectrum Range in the south from the Mount Edziza area in the north.

=== Lakes ===
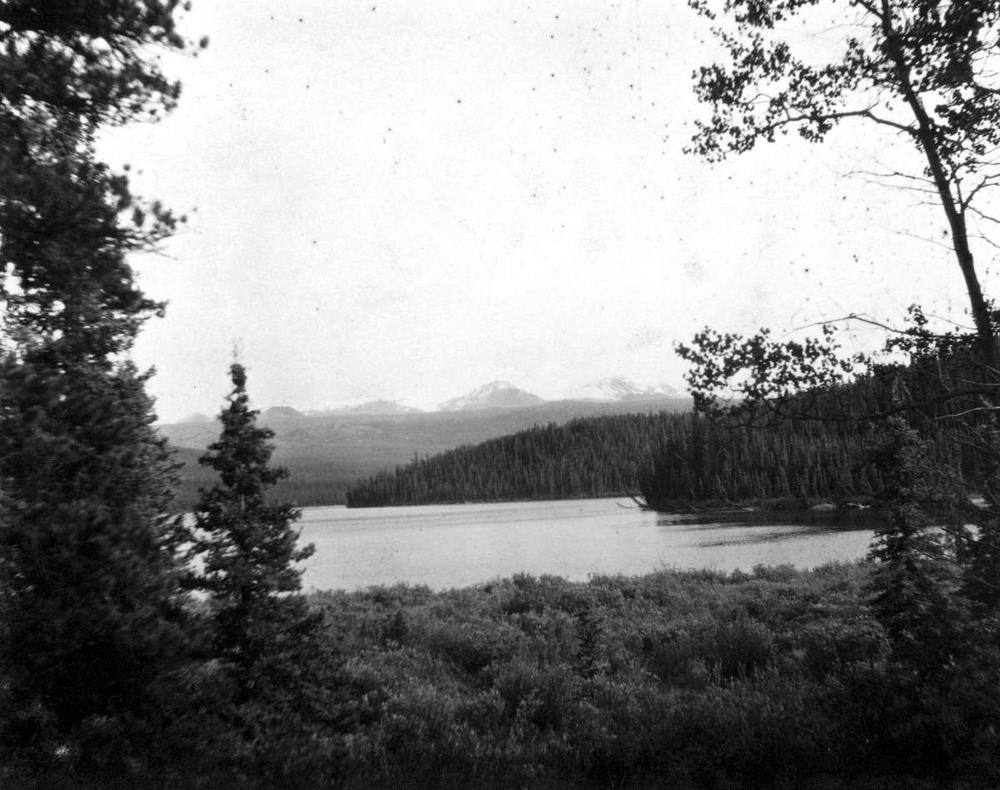
Buckley Lake with Mount Edziza in the background

The eastern side of the MEVC is flanked by the Mowdade, Kakiddi, Mowchilla and Nuttlude lakes in Kakiddi Valley; the last three lakes drain north into the Klastline River. Buckley Lake is the main lake bordering the northern side of the MEVC whereas Mess Lake is the main lake bordering the western side of the MEVC. Southeast of the MEVC is 180 Lake, so-named because it is large enough for the Cessna 180 Skywagon to safely operate. The southern end of the MEVC is flanked by Arctic Lake, which gets its name from the surrounding barren and treeless landscape.

Two small lakes are named on the southern portion of the MEVC. At the head of the Little Iskut River is Little Ball Lake, also called Kounugu Lake after the guardian of fresh water in Tahltan folklore. It lies immediately south of Kounugu Mountain in the Spectrum Range and east of Ball Creek. Little Arctic Lake lies northeast of Arctic Lake near the northeastern flank of Wetalth Ridge.

=== Drainage ===
The MEVC is drained on all sides by streams within the Stikine River watershed. To the west, Mess Creek flows north along the Mess Creek Escarpment inside a broad valley paralleling the MEVC. It then flows northwest into the Stikine River near the community of Telegraph Creek. Several short tributaries of Mess Creek drain the western half of the MEVC where they have cut steep-sided canyons into the volcanic plateau. This includes Crayke Creek which flows to the southwest, Elwyn Creek which flows to the west, Kitsu Creek which flows to the northwest, Raspberry Creek which flows to the northwest, Tadekho Creek which flows to the northwest, and Taweh Creek which flows to the northwest. Many of these Mess Creek tributaries also contain tributaries; the only named tributary of Elwyn Creek is Kadeya Creek, which flows northwest from Mount Edziza. Kitsu Creek contains one named tributary, Nagha Creek, which flows northwest from the Spectrum Range. Walkout Creek is the only named tributary of Raspberry Creek; it flows west in a canyon west of the Armadillo Highlands and also contains only one named tributary, Flyin Creek, which flows northwest from near the west side of Cache Hill. The only named tributary of Taweh Creek is Sezill Creek, which flows northwest in a canyon southwest of Mount Edziza.

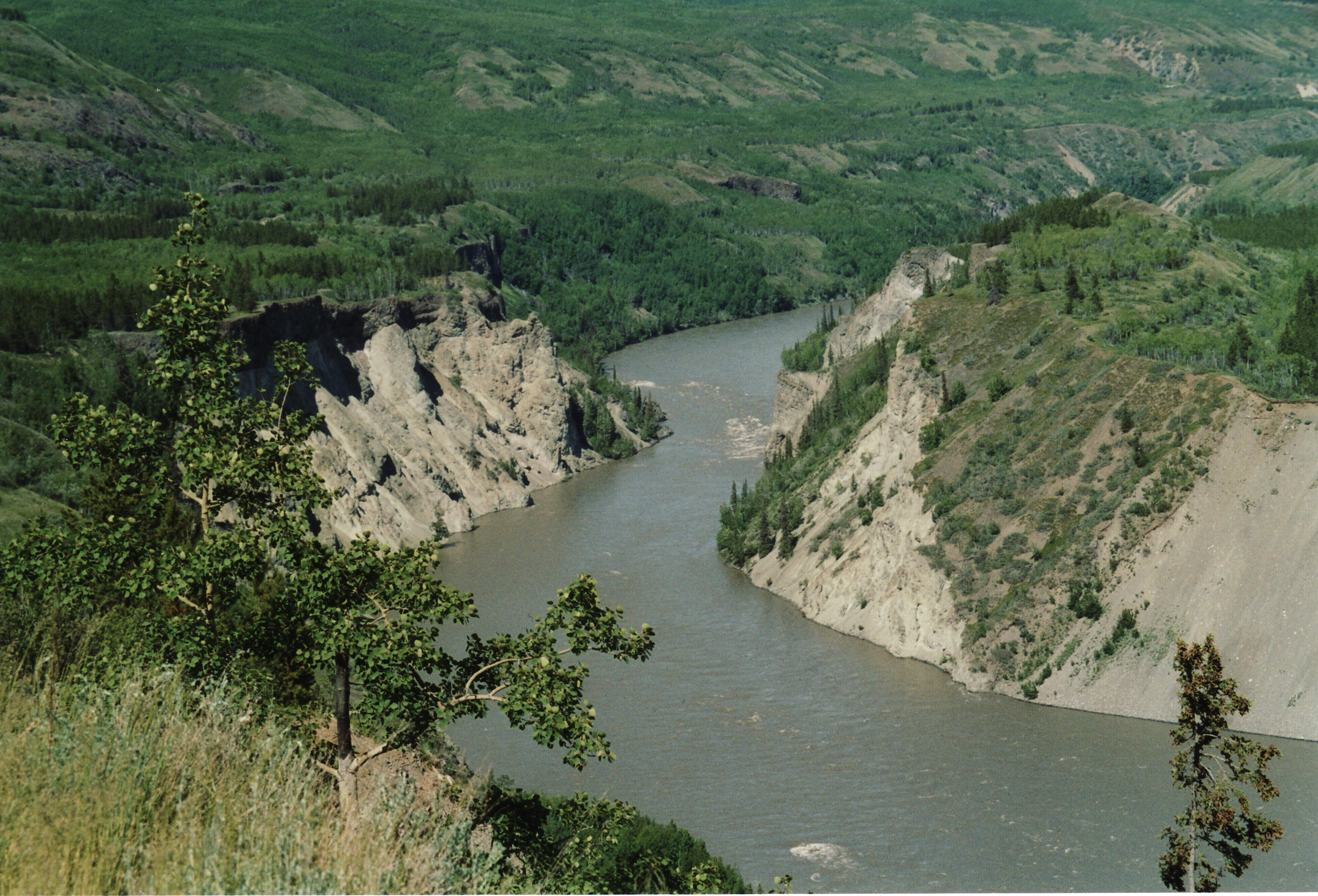
The Stikine River drains the MEVC via tributaries that flow adjacent to the volcanic complex.

To the east, the MEVC overlooks a drainage divide that lies in a broad hummocky lowland. Its upper eastern half is drained by tributaries of Kakiddi Creek. These include the Nido, Tenchen and Tennaya creeks which flow to the northeast from the eastern side of Mount Edziza, Tsecha Creek which flows to the northeast from near Williams Cone, and the Shaman and Sorcery creeks which flow to the east and north from near Kaia Bluff. Shaman Creek contains one named tributary, Chakima Creek, which flows to the east and north. The rapidly eroding headwalls and steep spurs on the eastern side of the MEVC have deposited glacial and landslide debris into these tributaries. Transportation of this debris into Kakiddi Valley has produced several large alluvial fans behind which the Kakiddi, Mowchilla, Mowdade and Nuttlude lakes have formed.

The lower eastern half and south end of the MEVC are drained by tributaries of the Iskut River. This includes Ball Creek which flows to the south from the southeastern side of the Spectrum Range, More Creek which flows to the southeast from the southern side of the Spectrum Range, and the Little Iskut River which flows to the southeast from the southeastern side of the Spectrum Range. The only named tributary of Ball Creek is Chachani Creek, which flows to the southeast from the eastern end of the Arctic Lake Plateau. Tributaries of the Little Iskut River include Stewbomb Creek, which flows eastwards from the eastern side of the Spectrum Range, and Bourgeaux Creek which flows to the east from Raspberry Pass. The only named tributary of Stewbomb Creek is Artifact Creek, which flows to the southeast between Artifact Ridge and Obsidian Ridge. Bourgeaux Creek contains one named tributary, Gerlib Creek, which flows southwards from between Tadeda Peak and Armadillo Peak. Several small, unnamed streams drain the youthful northern side of the MEVC; they flow north into the Klastline River and contain shallowly incised channels.

=== Climate ===
The surrounding area is characterized by warm summers and cold, snowy winters; Mount Edziza itself is covered by snow year-round. Temperatures are warmest in mid-summer during the day when they may hit the 30 degrees Celsius (86 degrees Fahrenheit) range. However, temperatures can drop below freezing during summer nights, making snow or freezing rain a possibility at any time of the year. The closest weather stations to the MEVC are located at Telegraph Creek and Dease Lake, which lie about 40 km (25 mi) to the northwest and 85 km (53 mi) to the northeast, respectively.

Meteorological data from the Telegraph Creek and Dease Lake weather stations suggest that the MEVC area has a temperature gradient of around −1.5 degrees Celsius (29.3 degrees Fahrenheit) per 1,000 m (3,300 ft) increase in elevation. The data also suggest that precipitation likely increases with altitude. At Mess Creek, the mean annual temperature is probably around −1 degree Celsius (30 degrees Fahrenheit) while the annual precipitation likely amounts to 400 millimetres (16 inches) of snow and rain. The mean annual temperature at an elevation of 1,390 m (4,560 ft) is likely about −1 to −5 degrees Celsius (30 to 23 degrees Fahrenheit) where annual precipitation amounts to approximately 400 to 500 millimetres (16 to 20 inches).

=== Animals and plants ===
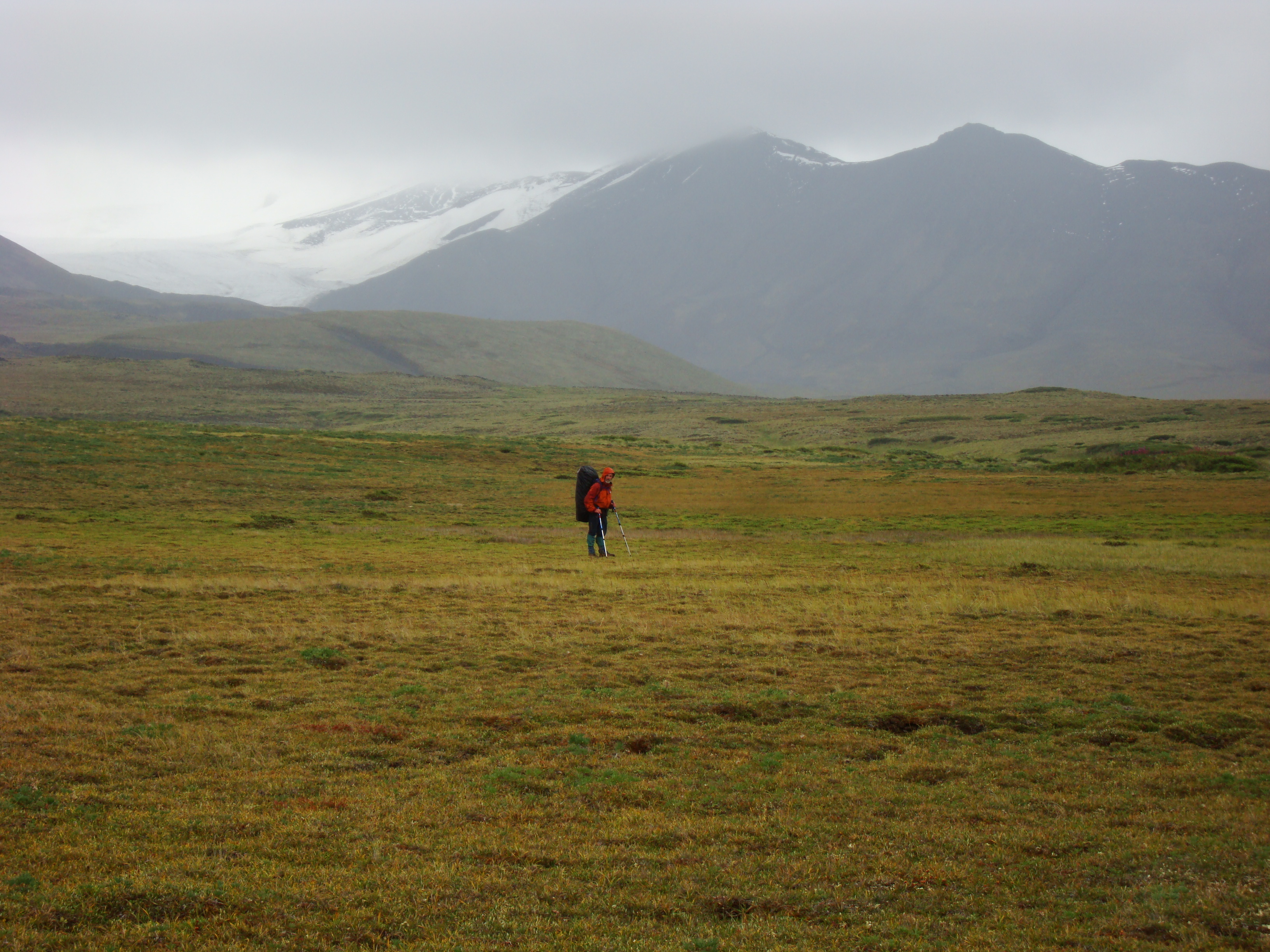
Alpine tundra of the MEVC

Arctic ground squirrels are abundant above the timberline where grizzly bears are occasionally seen. The alpine and subalpine zones between Mount Edziza and the western escarpment contain small herds of Osborn caribou. The western escarpment, the Spectrum Range and the eastern, western and southern flanks of Mount Edziza contain mountain goats and stone sheep. Other mammals in the area include moose, black bears and wolves. Several species of birds are also present in the area, including scaup, owls, goldeneye, grebes, gyrfalcons, white-winged scoters, ravens, grouse and ptarmigans.

The area between Buckley Lake and Telegraph Creek contains peat meadows, shrub fields and wet grasslands. It is characterized by long, severe winters with short growing seasons and deeply frozen soils. The Mess Creek, Kakiddi and Klastline valleys are intermixed with white spruce, trembling aspen and lodgepole pine, the latter two of which occur in drier areas. Balsam poplar grows on delta soils and near lakes and creeks. The MEVC plateau is characterized by alpine and subalpine vegetation zones.

=== Glaciation ===
The MEVC was covered by a regional ice sheet during the Pleistocene which receded and advanced periodically until about 11,000 years ago when deglaciation was essentially complete in a steadily warming climate. This warming trend ceased about 2,600 years ago, causing glaciers to advance from Mount Edziza, Ice Peak, the Spectrum Range and the Armadillo Highlands as part of the neoglaciation. As these glaciers advanced they built up to 18 m (59 ft) high terminal moraines on the plateau surface which compose the trim lines of the current mountain glaciers. The present trend towards a more moderate climate put an end to the neoglacial period in the 19th century, resulting in rapid glacial recession throughout the MEVC. This rapid glacial recession is apparent from the lack of vegetation on the barren, rocky ground between the glaciers and their trim lines which are up to 2 km (1.2 mi) apart.

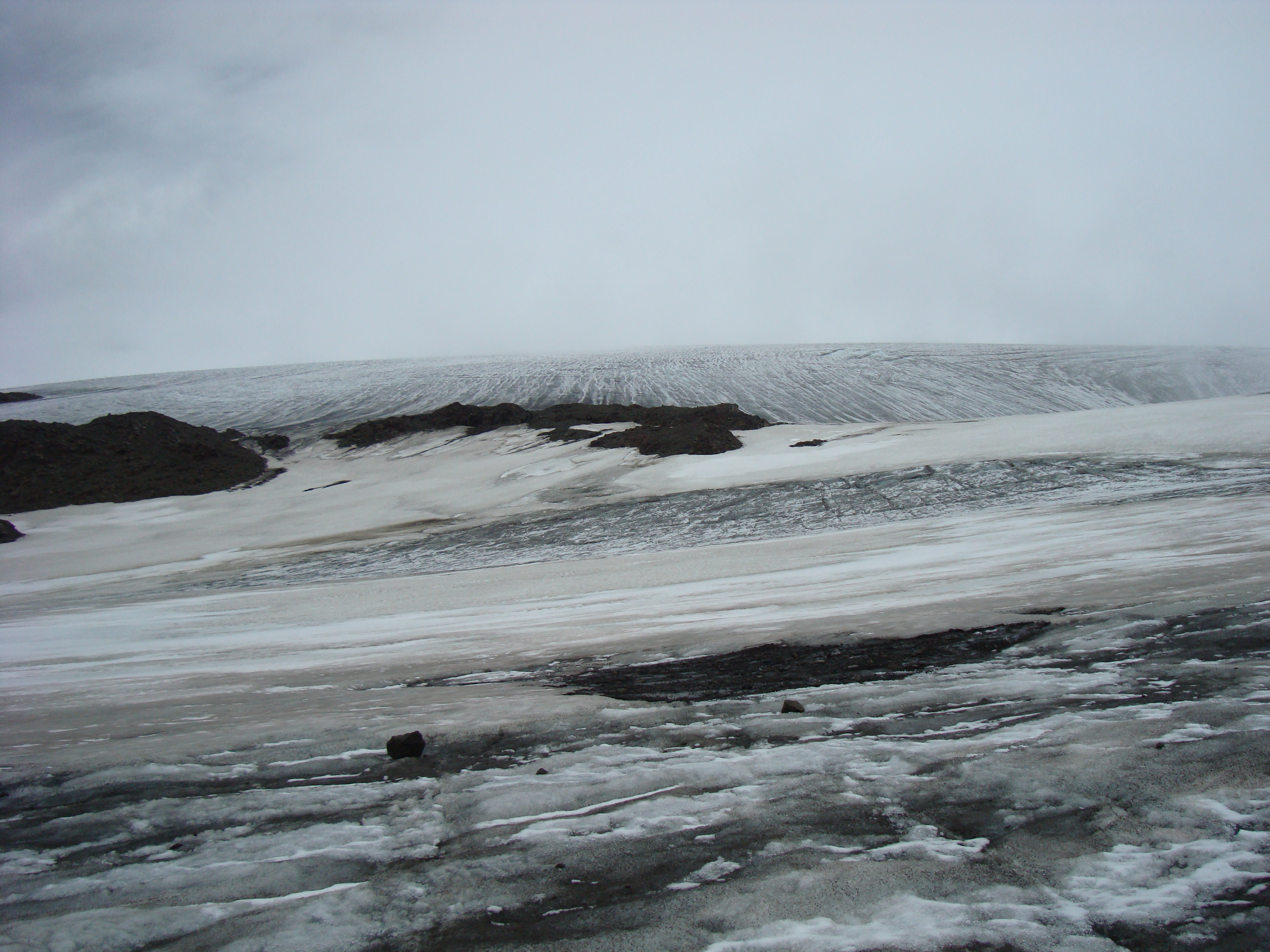
Glacier of the Mount Edziza ice cap

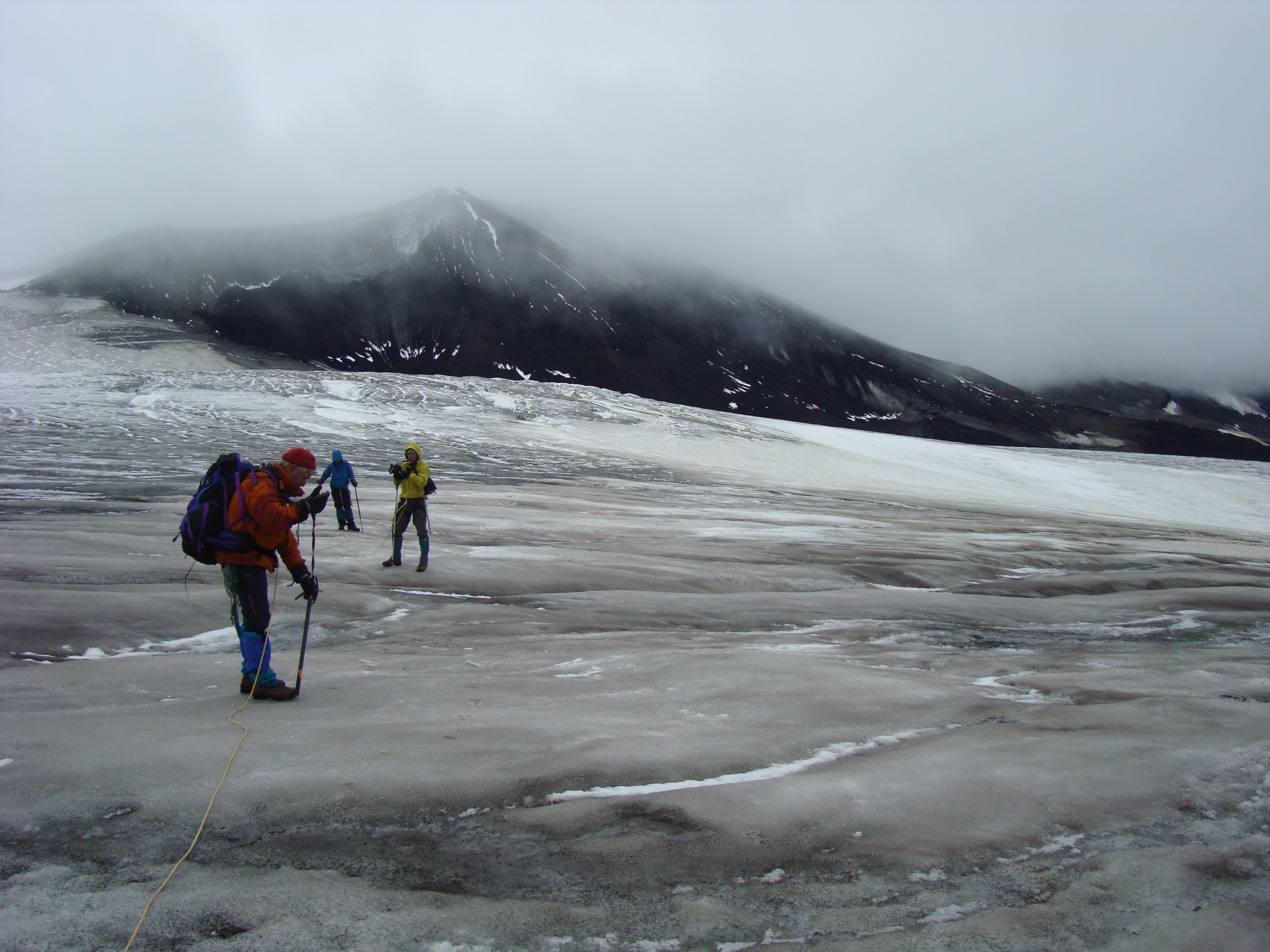
Mount Edziza glacier with Tennena Cone in the background

The MEVC has been extensively modified by local and regional glaciations as evidenced by the existence of drumlins and glacial striations, which record ice movement to the north-northwest across the western portion of the plateau. Evidence of ice stagnation is present in the form of outflow channels, eskers, kames, kettles and morainal ridges on the northern side of the MEVC adjacent to Buckley Lake. Deglaciation of unstable and oversteepened valley walls has caused several landslides in the geologic past, especially along the Mess Creek Escarpment. This instability is attributed to the low-yield strength of the highly fractured, poorly consolidated rocks forming the MEVC.

Most peaks greater than 2,130 m (6,990 ft) in elevation have glaciers. Small separate glaciers are largely restricted to the southern half of the MEVC where they occur in the Spectrum Range, on Armadillo Peak and elsewhere. In contrast, Mount Edziza and Ice Peak are obscured by a relatively large ice cap that covers an area of 70 km^{2} (27 mi^{2}). The western side of this ice cap is drained by many outlet glaciers that spread in broad lobes onto the Big Raven Plateau whereas the eastern side is drained by distributary glaciers that drape down steep slopes to form discontinuous icefalls.

Five officially named glaciers are situated at the northern and southern ends of the MEVC. Idiji Glacier lies southeast of Mount Edziza on the eastern side of the MEVC. At the head of Nagha Creek in the western portion of the Spectrum Range is Nagha Glacier. Tenchen Glacier is a debris-covered glacier on the eastern side of Mount Edziza at the head of Tenchen Creek. South of Mount Edziza lies Tencho Glacier, the largest glacier of the MEVC. Tennaya Glacier lies at the head of Tennaya Creek on the southeastern side of Mount Edziza. The informally named Yeda Glacier existed at the head of Ball Creek south of Yeda Peak in the Spectrum Range in 1988.

== Geology ==
=== Background ===
The MEVC is part of the Northern Cordilleran Volcanic Province (NCVP), a broad area of shield volcanoes, lava domes, cinder cones and stratovolcanoes extending from northwestern British Columbia northwards through Yukon into easternmost Alaska. The dominant rocks that make up these volcanoes are alkali basalts and hawaiites, but nephelinites, basanites and peralkaline (Note: Peralkaline rocks are magmatic rocks that have a higher ratio of sodium and potassium to aluminum.) phonolites, trachytes and comendites are locally abundant. These rocks were deposited by volcanic eruptions from 20 million years ago to as recently as a few hundred years ago. Volcanism in the Northern Cordilleran Volcanic Province is thought to be due to rifting of the North American Cordillera, driven by changes in relative plate motion between the North American and Pacific plates.

The MEVC is part of a subdivision of the NCVP called the Stikine Subprovince. This subprovince, confined to the Stikine region of northwestern British Columbia, includes three other volcanic complexes: Heart Peaks, Hoodoo Mountain and Level Mountain. The four complexes differ petrologically and/or volumetrically from the rest of the NCVP. Heart Peaks, Level Mountain and the MEVC are the largest NCVP centres by volume, the latter two having experienced volcanism for a much longer timespan than any other NCVP centre. Level Mountain, Hoodoo Mountain and the MEVC are the only NCVP centres that contain volcanic rocks of both mafic and intermediate to felsic (Note: Felsic pertains to magmatic rocks that are enriched with silicon, oxygen, aluminum, sodium and potassium.) composition. The highest of the four complexes is the MEVC at 2,786 m (9,140 ft), followed by Level Mountain at 2,164 m (7,100 ft), Heart Peaks at 2,012 m (6,601 ft) and Hoodoo Mountain at 1,850 m (6,070 ft).

=== Composition ===
The most voluminous rocks composing the MEVC are mafic (Note: Mafic pertains to magmatic rocks that are relatively rich in iron and magnesium, relative to silicium.) alkali basalts and hawaiites, which make up about 60% of the volcanic complex. MEVC hawaiites are thought to be the product of partial fractional crystallization (Note: Fractional crystallization is the process by which magma cools and separates into various minerals.) and the accumulation of feldspar inside rising columns of mantle-derived alkali basaltic magma. Volcanic rocks of intermediate composition such as benmoreite, trachybasalt, mugearite and tristanite are present in relatively small volumes. They are the result of alkali basaltic magma having undergone fractional crystallization in magma chambers on a longer timespan. Felsic peralkaline rocks such as trachyte, comendite and pantellerite form about 40% of the MEVC; they are the product of prolonged fractional crystallization of mantle-derived basaltic magma in magma chambers and mainly make up lava domes and central volcanoes.

=== Basement ===
Underlying the MEVC is the Stikinia terrane, a Paleozoic and Mesozoic suite of volcanic and sedimentary rocks that accreted (Note: Accretion is the process by which terranes are added to a continent, resulting in continental growth.) to the continental margin of North America during the Jurassic. Rocks of Paleozoic age such as limestone, bedded tuff and volcanic rocks of intermediate composition underlie the western and southern portions of the MEVC. Mesozoic rocks underlie most of the MEVC and include andesite, basaltic andesite, volcanic sandstone, siltstone, shale, greywacke, limestone and chert. The youngest basement rocks are those of the Sloko Group, which consists of Early Tertiary intermediate calc-alkaline volcanic rocks and related subvolcanic plutons. These rocks were tilted, cut by normal faults and heavily eroded before volcanism began at the MEVC in the Late Miocene, such that the volcanic complex was built on a mature, gently rolling Tertiary erosion surface.

=== Faulting ===
The MEVC lies on the eastern shoulder of Mess Creek valley, a long and narrow graben-like depression possibly linked to volcanism of the volcanic complex. The eastern edge of the valley is bounded by north-trending faults, one of which has been traced for more than 24 km (15 mi). This fault shows signs of having been active contemporaneously with volcanism of the MEVC; it has vertically displaced Holocene basalt flows by 15 to 20 m (50 to 70 ft) and older basalt flows by 91 to 122 m (299 to 400 ft), such that the western side of the fault has moved downward. The downthrowing of this fault during the Holocene may have been due to the draining of magma chambers following eruptions at the MEVC.

The existence of peralkaline rocks at the MEVC and the presence of normal faults along Mess Creek valley support the conclusion that the MEVC lies in an area of continental rifting. Many tufa terraces along the fault zone contain pressure ridges 10 to 40 centimetres (3.9 to 15.7 inches) high and 50 to 100 m (160 to 330 ft) long, suggesting that these faults are still active. This was confirmed by a local trapper in 1992 who noted that new pressure ridges appeared each year.

=== Subdivisions ===
The MEVC was originally subdivided into 15 geological formations, two of which are no longer used:

Current
Name	Lithology	Volcanology
Big Raven Formation	Alkali basalt, hawaiite, trachyte	Volcanic cones, lava flows, air-fall tephra
Kakiddi Formation	Trachyte	Lava flows, pyroclastic rocks
Klastline Formation	Alkali basalt	Volcanic cones, lava flows
Arctic Lake Formation	Alkali basalt	Volcanic cones, subglacial volcanoes, lava flows
Edziza Formation	Trachyte	Stratovolcano, lava domes, lava flows
Pillow Ridge Formation	Alkali basalt	Subglacial volcanoes
Ice Peak Formation	Alkali basalt, hawaiite, mugearite, benmoreite, trachyte	Volcanic cones, shield volcanoes, lava domes
Pyramid Formation	Trachyte, comendite, pantellerite	Lava domes, lava flows
Spectrum Formation	Trachyte, comendite, rhyolite	Lava dome
Nido Formation	Alkali basalt, hawaiite	Shield volcanoes, lava flows
Armadillo Formation	Alkali basalt, comendite, trachyte	Caldera, lava domes, lava flows
Little Iskut Formation	Trachybasalt	Shield volcano, lava flows
Raspberry Formation	Alkali basalt, hawaiite	Shield volcano, lava flows
Former
Name	Lithology	Notes
Sheep Track Formation	Trachyte	Reassigned as a member of the Big Raven Formation.
Kounugu Formation	Alkali basalt, hawaiite	Reassigned as a member of the Nido Formation.

=== Volcanism ===
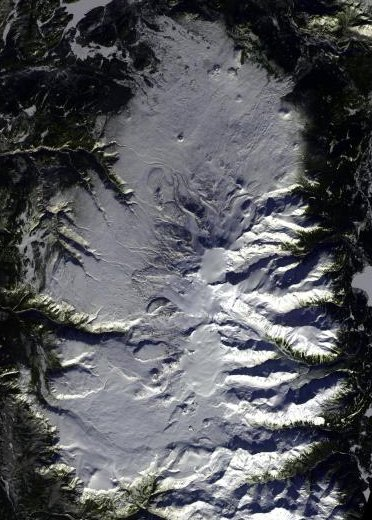
Satellite imagery of Mount Edziza and the surrounding snow-covered Big Raven Plateau

The MEVC is a highly active volcanic system with a nearly continuous record of activity dating from the Miocene. It covers 1,000 km^{2} (390 mi^{2}) and consists of 665 km^{3} (160 mi^{3}) of volcanic material, making it the second largest eruptive centre in the NCVP after Level Mountain. The MEVC is also the second most long-lived eruptive centre in the NCVP after Level Mountain, having started erupting at least 7.4 million years ago. The eruption sequence and style of the MEVC, along with its chemistry, mineralogy and isotopic composition, is similar to continental peralkaline volcanism at the Rainbow Range of central British Columbia, the Afar Depression of East Africa, and parts of the Great Basin of the western United States.

Five cycles of magmatic activity created the MEVC; one in the Miocene, one in the Plio-Pleistocene, two in the Pleistocene and one in the Holocene. Several eruptions of the latest magmatic cycle have not been quantitatively dated. Instead, a Holocene age is inferred because their eruptive products do not show evidence of having been glaciated by the Cordilleran Ice Sheet, which retreated from the area about 11,000 years ago. Therefore, many of these inferred Holocene eruptions may have occurred as early as the time of glacial retreat. An eruption recurrence interval of 379 years has been calculated for the MEVC by dividing 11,000 years by the number of demonstrable Holocene eruptions, of which there are at least 29. This would make the MEVC the most active eruptive centre in Canada throughout the Holocene; it is also one of the most widespread areas of recent volcanism in Canada.

Eruptions have occurred subaqueously, subglacially and subaerially throughout the long eruptive history of the MEVC. Interactions between ice and volcanism are well-documented at the MEVC, occurring in seven of the 13 geological formations compossing the volcanic complex. This includes the Pyramid, Ice Peak, Pillow Ridge, Edziza, Arctic Lake, Klastline and Big Raven formations, which have all formed within the last two million years. Volcano-ice interactions at these formations is represented by pillow lava, tuff breccia, hyaloclastite, glacial till interbedded with lava flows, and massive lava with well-developed slender columnar joints. The MEVC has been scoured by regional glaciations at least twice during its eruptive history, as well as several smaller advances of local alpine glaciers.

=== Geothermal activity ===
The MEVC is volcanically dormant but it still remains geothermally active. Four hot spring areas are found along the western flank of the MEVC at Mess Lake, Mess Creek, Elwyn Creek and Sezill Creek, the latter three of which have recorded water temperatures of 42.5 degrees Celsius (108.5 degrees Fahrenheit), 36 degrees Celsius (97 degrees Fahrenheit) and 46 degrees Celsius (115 degrees Fahrenheit), respectively. Discharge at the Sezill Creek, Elwyn Creek and Mess Lake hot springs may be linked to shallow hydrothermal systems driven by residual magmatic heat as they are adjacent to recently active eruptive centres. In contrast, the Mess Creek Hot Springs may be discharging from a deeply circulating hydraulic system along a major fault on the western side of Mess Creek valley. Estimated subsurface temperatures, as derived from geothermometers, are 177 degrees Celsius (351 degrees Fahrenheit) based on silica concentrations and 227 degrees Celsius (441 degrees Fahrenheit) based on sodium-potassium-calcium ratios. This makes the MEVC a potential high-temperature geothermal resource area but it does not warrant subsurface exploration due to its remote location.

The Mess Lake Hot Springs are situated near the southeastern corner of Mess Lake. They lie at an elevation of 760 m (2,490 ft) and have created massive deposits of tufa that cover more than 120 hectares (300 acres). These springs had a vigorous flow of warm water in 1965, but by 1992 they were discharging water below human body temperature. The Mess Creek Hot Springs 7 km (4.3 mi) south of Mess Lake are on the western side of Mess Creek where they attain an elevation of 760 m (2,490 ft). Along the banks of Elwyn Creek at an elevation of 1,440 m (4,720 ft) are the Elwyn Hot Springs which have created thick tufa deposits. The Taweh Hot Springs extend 0.5 km (0.31 mi) along Sezill Creek at an elevation of 1,310 m (4,300 ft) and emit thermal waters containing carbon dioxide; extensive tufa deposits occur at these springs.

=== Hazards and monitoring ===
Natural Resources Canada considers the MEVC a high threat volcanic complex because it has had the highest eruption rate in Canada throughout the Holocene. However, its extremely remote location makes it less hazardous than volcanoes in southwestern British Columbia. MEVC trachyte and rhyolite have silica-rich compositions that are comparable to those associated with the most powerful eruptions around the world; parts of northwestern Canada could be affected by an ash column if an explosive eruption were to happen at the MEVC. Ash columns can drift for thousands of kilometres downwind and often become increasingly spread out over a larger area with increasing distance from an erupting vent. The MEVC lies under a major air route from Vancouver, British Columbia to Whitehorse, Yukon, suggesting that the volcanic complex poses a potential threat to air traffic. Volcanic ash reduces visibility and can cause jet engine failure, as well as damage to other aircraft systems. Lava flows are also a potential hazard as they have formerly dammed the Klastline and Stikine rivers, the latter of which contains a major salmon fishery. Another potential hazard at the MEVC is the ignition of wildfires by eruptions as the surrounding area has vegetation. An eruption under the ice cap would possibly produce floods or lahars that could flow into the Stikine or Iskut rivers, potentially destroying salmon runs and threatening river bank villages.

Like other volcanic complexes in Canada, the MEVC is not monitored closely enough by the Geological Survey of Canada to ascertain its activity level. The Canadian National Seismograph Network has been established to monitor earthquakes throughout Canada, but it is too far away to provide an accurate indication of activity under the complex. It may sense an increase in seismic activity if the MEVC becomes highly restless, but this may only provide a warning for a large eruption; the system might detect activity only once the complex has started erupting. If the MEVC were to erupt, mechanisms exist to orchestrate relief efforts. The Interagency Volcanic Event Notification Plan was created to outline the notification procedure of some of the main agencies that would respond to an erupting volcano in Canada, an eruption close to the Canada–United States border or any eruption that would affect Canada.

== Human history ==
=== Indigenous peoples ===
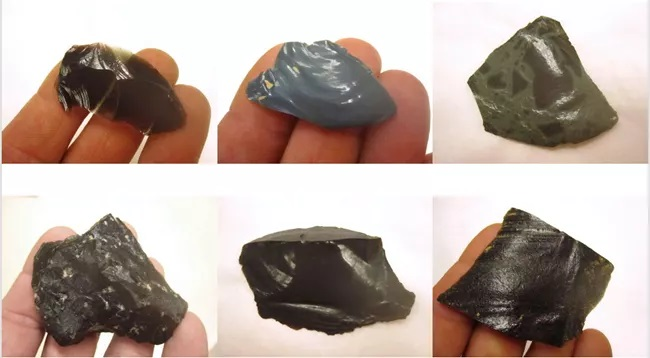
Obsidian from the Mount Edziza volcanic complex found in coastal areas of southeast Alaska

The MEVC lies within the traditional territory of the Tahltan people which covers an area of more than 93,500 km^{2} (36,100 mi^{2}). Historically, the MEVC was a significant source of obsidian for the Tahltan people. This volcanic glass was used in the manufacturing of projectile points and cutting blades which were widely traded throughout the Pacific Northwest. Obsidian from the MEVC has been recovered from archaeological sites in Alaska, Yukon, western Alberta and along the British Columbia Coast, making Edziza obsidian the most widely distributed obsidian in western North America. Edziza obsidian from the Hidden Falls archaeological site in Alaska has yielded a hydration date of 10,000 years; this suggests that the MEVC was being exploited as an obsidian source soon after ice sheets of the last glacial period retreated.

The MEVC continues to be an important cultural resource for the Tahltan people. In 2021, Chad Norman Day, president of the Tahltan Central Government, said "Mount Edziza and the surrounding area has always been sacred to the Tahltan Nation. The obsidian from this portion of our territory provided us with weaponry, tools and trading goods that ensured our Tahltan people could thrive for thousands of years."

=== Telegraphy ===
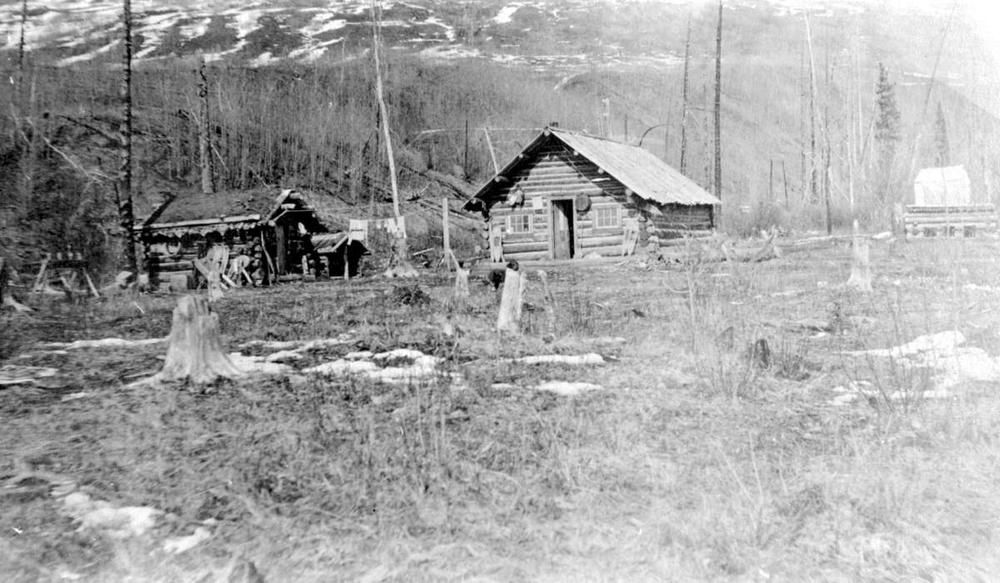
Raspberry Station along the Yukon Telegraph Line

Along the western side of the MEVC and through its central portion at Raspberry Pass are the remains of the Yukon Telegraph Line. This was a nearly 3,000 km (1,900 mi) long telegraphy system built by the Dominion Government Telegraph Service between 1897 and 1901 to send messages between Ashcroft, British Columbia in the south to Dawson City, Yukon in the north. A trail built to serve the line extended along much of its length and provided a route to the Yukon gold fields.

Log cabins housing two men were built every 32 km (20 mi) along the Yukon Telegraph Trail for maintenance. One of these maintenance cabins existed at Raspberry Creek in the central portion of the MEVC. The Yukon Telegraph Line and trail were maintained until 1936 when they were abandoned with the advent of radio communication. Remnants of this telegraphy system include collapsed cabins, telegraph wire and a few telegraph poles.

=== Geological studies ===
The MEVC is one of the best-studied volcanic centres in the NCVP. It was identified by the mapping program of Operation Stikine in 1956 along with Level Mountain, the Iskut-Unuk River Cones and many smaller volcanoes in the Canadian Cordillera. Their identification played a role in the closing of Canada's gap in the Ring of Fire because it allowed them to be added on the world volcanic map. The mapping program of Operation Stikine, masterminded by Jack Souther, was carried out over the Stikine River area using a Bell helicopter. Souther began detailed mapping of the MEVC in 1965 when he was given the job of working on the volcanic complex by the Geological Survey of Canada. Japanese volcanologist Hisashi Kuno visited the MEVC with Souther in 1966; Kuno Peak in the Spectrum Range was named in his honour.

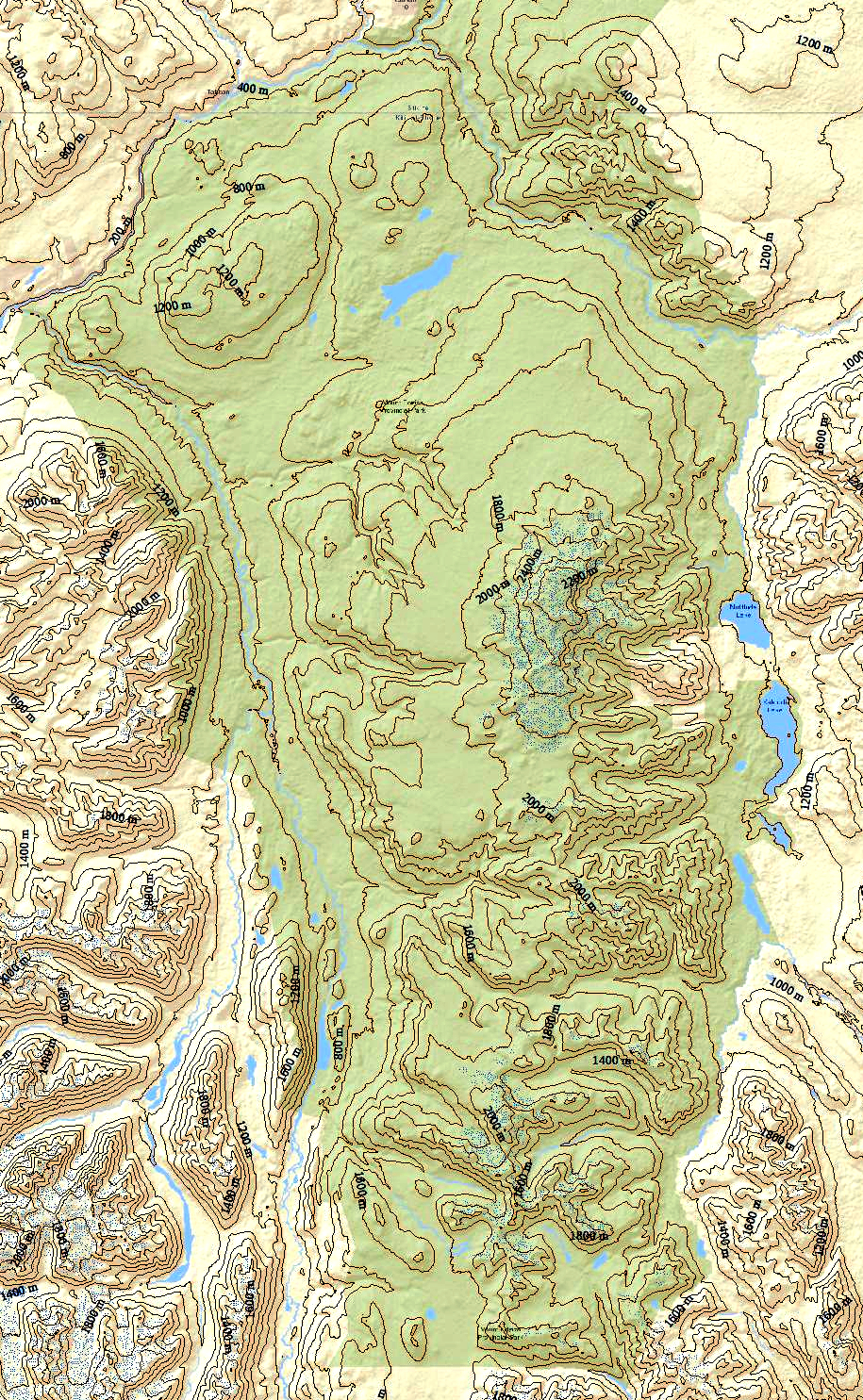
Topographic map with Mount Edziza Provincial Park in green

A three-month period of earthquake monitoring was conducted at the MEVC in 1968 after geologists of the Geological Survey of Canada suggested that there may still be magma movement under the volcanic complex. About 20 microearthquakes potentially associated with the MEVC were recorded by seismographs installed at Buckley Lake and Nuttlude Lake, but a seismological analysis suggested that they were of non-volcanic origin. The microearthquakes had magnitudes of around 0.5 which typically occur in many areas throughout the Canadian Cordillera.

By 1970, Souther and his assistant Maurice Lambert had established that episodic eruptions of alkali basalt and silicic peralkaline lavas had taken place at the MEVC over a timespan of at least 10 million years. They had also established that volcanism of the MEVC was accompanied by east–west extension and incipient rifting of Earth's crust. In 1974, Souther and Japanese volcanologist Kenzō Yagi conducted a study of aenigmatite crystals which occur in peralkaline rocks of the MEVC. Yagi Ridge in the Spectrum Range was named in honour of Kenzō Yagi who traversed this ridge with Souther during their geological studies. During his last year of serious field work in 1992, Souther published an extensive bulletin on his work entitled The Late Cenozoic Mount Edziza Volcanic Complex, British Columbia which highlighted the importance and size of the MEVC. The volcanic complex has since received very few geological studies.

A three-year period of field studies conducted at the MEVC around 2007 focused on using volcano-ice interactions to constrain paleo-environmental conditions. The project was a collaboration between Ben Edwards of Dickinson College, Ian Skilling of the University of Pittsburgh, Barry Cameron of the University of Wisconsin–Milwaukee, Ian Spooner of Acadia University, J. Osborn of the University of Calgary, Kirstie Simpson of the Geological Survey of Canada and Bill McIntosh of the New Mexico Institute of Mining and Technology. Five students conducted studies at the MEVC in 2007, namely Chira Endress of Dickinson College, Jeff Hungerford of the University of Pittsburgh, Courtney Haynes of Dickinson College, Alex Floyd of Dickinson College and Kristen LaMoreaux of the University of Pittsburgh.

=== Protected areas ===
Much of the MEVC was designated as a provincial park in 1972 to showcase its geological and geothermal features. A 101,171 ha (250,000 acres) recreation area surrounding the 132,000 ha (330,000 acres) park was also established in 1972. In 1989, Mount Edziza Provincial Park roughly doubled in size when 96,770 ha (239,100 acres) was annexed from the Mount Edziza Recreation Area. With this annexation, the recreation area was greatly reduced in size to around 4,000 ha (9,900 acres); it was eventually disestablished in 2003. Mount Edziza Provincial Park now covers an area of 266,180 ha (657,700 acres), making it one of the largest provincial parks in British Columbia.

In 2021, an approximately 3,528 ha (8,720 acres) conservation area called the Mount Edziza Conservancy was established northwest of Kakiddi Lake along the eastern border of Mount Edziza Provincial Park. It was established in collaboration with Skeena Resources, BC Parks, the Tahltan Central Government and the Nature Conservancy of Canada after Skeena Resources returned their mineral tenures on the Spectrum property. The name of this conservation area was changed to the Tenh Dẕetle Conservancy in 2022 to better reflect the culture, history and tradition of the Tahltan First Nation.

== Recreation ==
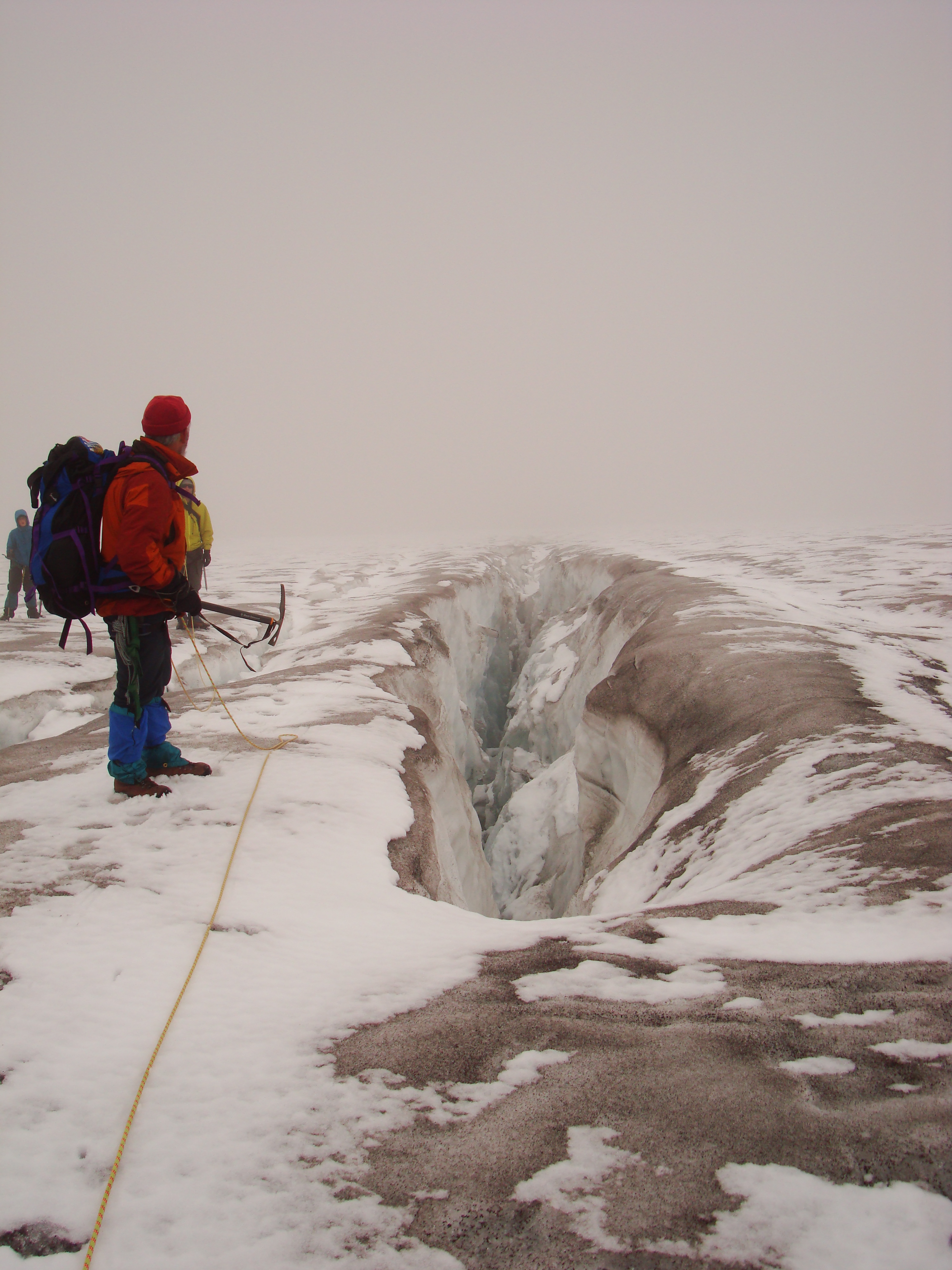
A backpacker next to a glacier crevasse on Mount Edziza

The MEVC offers many recreational activities, including mountain climbing, camping, fishing, hunting, horseback riding, wildlife viewing, photography, hiking and backpacking. Buckley Lake and Mowdade Lake on the northern and eastern sides of the MEVC contain campsites with fire rings, bear-proof metal food caches and backcountry-style toilets. It is advised by BC Parks to not gather wood for campfires within Mount Edziza Provincial Park to help maintain a healthy ecosystem community. The optimum time for backpacking is generally between July 1 and September 15 when weather conditions are the most suitable.

Kakiddi Lake, Mowchilla Lake, Mowdade Lake, Nuttlude Lake and Buckley Lake are well populated with rainbow trout and offer fishing at the MEVC. A limited entry hunting authorization is required for the hunting of mountain goats, mountain sheep and caribou within Mount Edziza Provincial Park. Horseback riding at the MEVC requires a letter of authorization. The many cinder cones dotting the MEVC have designated climbing routes to prevent scarring on their delicate surfaces from foot traffic.

A hiking trail dubbed the Buckley Lake to Mowdade Lake Route extends across the northern half of the MEVC. It traverses south from Buckley Lake along Buckley Creek and gradually climbs onto the MEVC plateau where Eve Cone, Sidas Cone and Tsekone Ridge are visible along the route. Most of the Buckley Lake to Mowdade Lake Route is marked by a series of rock cairns from Tsekone Ridge onwards.

The distance between Buckley Lake and Mowdade Lake is about 70 km (43 mi) but the hiking length between these two lakes varies depending on the route taken; it can take a minimum of 7 days to hike the Buckley Lake to Mowdade Lake Route. The weather can change extremely fast along this hiking trail.

== Accessibility ==
The MEVC lies in a remote location with no established road access. The closest roads are the Stewart–Cassiar Highway to the east and the Telegraph Creek Road to the northwest; both come within 40 km (25 mi) of the volcanic complex. Extending from these roads are horse trails that provide access to the MEVC. From Telegraph Creek, the Buckley Lake Trail extends about 15 km (9.3 mi) southeast along Mess Creek and Three Mile Lake. It then traverses about 15 km (9.3 mi) northeast along Dagaichess Creek and Stinking Lake to the northeastern end of Buckley Lake. Here, it meets with the Klastline River Trail and the Buckley Lake to Mowdade Lake Route.

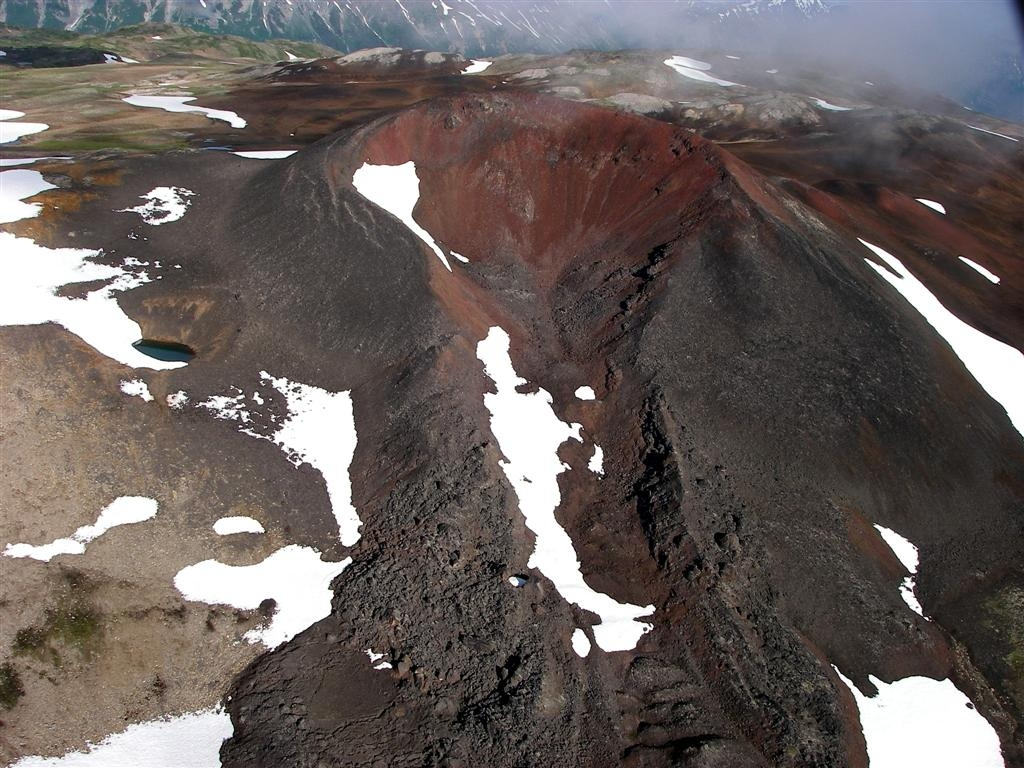
Nahta Cone from the east

To the northeast, the roughly 50 km (31 mi) long Klastline River Trail begins at the community of Iskut on the Stewart–Cassiar Highway; it extends northwest and west along the Klastline River for much of its length. The trail enters Mount Edziza Provincial Park at about 25 km (16 mi) where Kakiddi Creek drains into the Klastline River. After entering Mount Edziza Provincial Park, it traverses northwest along the Klastline River for about 10 km (6.2 mi) and then crosses the river north of the MEVC. From there, it traverses west for about 5 km (3.1 mi) to the northeastern end of Buckley Lake where it meets with the Buckley Lake Trail and Buckley Lake to Mowdade Lake Route.

From near the Eastman Creek Rest Area south of Kinaskan Lake on the Stewart–Cassiar Highway, the historic Yukon Telegraph Trail extends about 15 km (9.3 mi) west to the Little Iskut River. From there, it enters Mount Edziza Provincial Park and continues another 15 km (9.3 mi) west along Bourgeaux Creek into the central portion of the MEVC at Raspberry Pass. The Yukon Telegraph Trail then traverses about 10 km (6.2 mi) northwest along Raspberry Creek into the broad valley of Mess Creek where it continues another 30 km (19 mi) north along the western side of the MEVC. It conjoins with the Buckley Lake Trail near Matheson Creek. Only short segments of the Yukon Telegraph Trail are still passable, having been mostly overgrown since maintenance of the trail ended in 1936.

The MEVC can also be accessed via charter aircraft from Dease Lake and Tatogga Lake, the latter of which is near the community of Iskut. Private aircraft are prohibited from landing on the Kitsu Plateau lava flows. The Kakiddi, 180, Mess, Arctic, Nuttlude, Mowdade, Little Arctic, Little Ball, Mowchilla and Buckley lakes are large enough to be used by float-equipped aircraft. Landing on the latter four lakes with a private aircraft requires a letter of authorization from the BC Parks Stikine Senior Park Ranger. Alpine Lakes Air and BC Yukon Air are the only air charter companies permitted to provide access to this area via aircraft.

== See also ==
- List of Northern Cordilleran volcanoes
- List of volcanoes in Canada
- Volcanism of Western Canada
