= Little Ball Lake =

Lake in British Columbia, Canada

- Location within British Columbia
- Location: Mount Edziza Provincial Park, British Columbia
- Coordinates: 57°20′55″N 130°35′20″W
- Primary outflows: Little Iskut River
- Basin countries: Canada

Little Ball Lake is a small lake in Cassiar Land District of northwestern British Columbia, Canada. It lies at the head of the Little Iskut River just south of Kounugu Mountain at the southeastern end of the Spectrum Range in Mount Edziza Provincial Park. The lake contains one island and Ball Creek flows in its vicinity.

Little Ball Lake was referred to as Kounugu Lake by Canadian volcanologist Jack Souther who studied the Mount Edziza volcanic complex in detail for many years. Kounugu was the guardian of fresh water in Tahltan folklore "who slept throughout the day on top of the well that contained his treasure".

Little Ball Lake is one of several lakes that are large enough to be used by float-equipped aircraft to gain access to Mount Edziza Provincial Park. However, landing on the lake with a private aircraft requires a letter of authorization from the BC Parks Stikine Senior Park Ranger.

Little Ball Lake's mean annual discharge is estimated at 0.135 m^{3}/s (4.8 cu ft/s). Its watershed covers 3.79 km^{2} (1.46 sq mi) which is entirely within Mount Edziza Provincial Park. The watershed drains parts of the Mount Edziza volcanic complex. The watershed's land cover is classified as 43% barren, 25.4% herbaceous, 20.4% shrubland, 10.1% water, 0.7% snow/glacier and 0.5% conifer forest.

== See also ==
- List of lakes of British Columbia
