= Stewbomb Creek =

Tribuatary river in the country of Canada

- Mouth of Stewbomb Creek

Location
- Country: Canada
- Province: British Columbia
- District: Cassiar Land District

Physical characteristics
- Source: Yeda Peak
  - location: Spectrum Range
  - coordinates: 57°23′15″N 130°40′1″W
  - elevation: 1,720 m (5,640 ft)
- Mouth: Little Iskut River
  - coordinates: 57°24′39″N 130°29′42″W
  - elevation: 1,110 m (3,640 ft)
- Length: 14 km (8.7 mi)
- Basin size: 88.9 km^{2} (34.3 sq mi),
- Discharge
  - average: 3.48 m^{3}/s (123 cu ft/s)

Basin features
- Topo map: NTS 104G7 Mess Lake; NTS 104G8 Refuge Lake

Stewbomb Creek is a tributary of the Little Iskut River and part of the Stikine River watershed in northwest part of the province of British Columbia, Canada. It flows generally southeast for roughly 14 km (8.7 mi) to join the Little Iskut River, which flows into the Iskut River, the largest tributary of the Stikine River.

Stewbomb Creek's watershed covers 88.9 km^{2} (34.3 sq mi), and is entirely in Mount Edziza Provincial Park. The creek's mean annual discharge is estimated at 3.48 m^{3}/s (123 cu ft/s).

The mouth of Stewbomb Creek is located about 68 km (42 mi) southeast of Telegraph Creek, British Columbia, about 120 km (75 mi) south of Dease Lake, British Columbia, and about 250 km (160 mi) southeast of Juneau, Alaska. Stewbomb Creek's watershed's land cover is classified as 49.4% barren, 13.8% shrubland, 13.7% herbaceous, 11.9% snow/glacier, 10.7% conifer forest, and small amounts of other cover.

Stewbomb Creek is in Mount Edziza Provincial Park, which lies within the traditional territory of the Tahltan First Nation, of the Tahltan people.

== Geography ==
Stewbomb Creek originates on the north side of Yeda Peak of the Spectrum Range. The creek flows north, then east. After about 10 km (6.2 mi) it is joined by Artifact Creek. About 4 km (2.5 mi) after that Stewbomb Creek empties into the Little Iskut River at the eastern boundary of Mount Edziza Provincial Park. Obsidian Ridge lies between Stewbomb and Artifact Creeks.

== History ==
According to the 1992 Geological Survey of Canada memoir The Late Cenozoic Mount Edziza Volcanic Complex, British Columbia, Stewbomb Creek was so-named to commemorate the explosion of a pressure cooker full of stew. The incident happened in a tent while Canadian volcanologist Jack Souther and his team were camping on the creek during field mapping.

== See also ==
- List of rivers of British Columbia
