= Wetalth Ridge =

Isolated ridge in Canada

- Location within British Columbia
- Interactive map of Wetalth Ridge

Highest point
- Elevation: 1,886 m (6,188 ft)
- Prominence: 353 m (1,158 ft)
- Coordinates: 57°18′14″N 130°47′14″W

Geography
- Location: British Columbia, Canada
- District: Cassiar Land District
- Parent range: Tahltan Highland
- Topo map: NTS 104G7 Mess Lake

Geology
- Rock age: Pleistocene
- Mountain type: Subglacial mound
- Volcanic zone: Northern Cordilleran Volcanic Province
- Last eruption: Pleistocene

Wetalth Ridge is an isolated ridge in northern British Columbia, Canada, located 74 km (46 mi) southwest of Tatogga and south of Telegraph Creek. It lies on the southwest side of Little Arctic Lake at the southwest corner of Mount Edziza Provincial Park.

== History ==
Wetalth Ridge was named on January 2, 1980 by the Geological Survey of Canada to recall a small group of wandering and exploited outcasts from the Tahltans called "Wetalth" people.

== Geology ==
Wetalth Ridge is a volcanic feature associated with the Mount Edziza volcanic complex which in turn forms part of the Northern Cordilleran Volcanic Province. It is a subglacial mound that formed in the Pleistocene epoch when this area was buried beneath glacial ice during the last ice age.

== See also ==
- List of volcanoes in Canada
- List of Northern Cordilleran volcanoes
- Volcanism of Canada
- Volcanism of Western Canada
