= Tatogga =

- Locality
- Location of Tatogga in British Columbia
- Coordinates: 57°44′5″N 129°59′20″W
- Country: Canada
- Province: British Columbia
- Time zone: UTC−07:00 (PT)
- Highways: Highway 37

Tatogga is an unincorporated community in northwestern British Columbia, Canada. It is located situated along the Stewart-Cassiar Highway (Highway 37) on Tatogga Lake just south of Iskut. Tatogga means "small lake between two big lakes" in the Tahltan language.

== Climate ==
Climate data for Todagin Ranch, (Note: Todagin Ranch is located approximately 13 kilometres (8.1 mi) south-west of Tatogga.) elevation 899 m (2,949 ft), (1971–2000)
Month	Jan	Feb	Mar	Apr	May	Jun	Jul	Aug	Sep	Oct	Nov	Dec	Year
Record high °C (°F)	6.0 (42.8)	11.0 (51.8)	12.5 (54.5)	20.5 (68.9)	34.0 (93.2)	29.0 (84.2)	29.5 (85.1)	33.0 (91.4)	27.2 (81.0)	18.0 (64.4)	9.0 (48.2)	8.0 (46.4)	34.0 (93.2)
Mean daily maximum °C (°F)	−8.0 (17.6)	−3.4 (25.9)	2.1 (35.8)	7.3 (45.1)	12.6 (54.7)	17.0 (62.6)	18.8 (65.8)	18.3 (64.9)	13.0 (55.4)	5.6 (42.1)	−3.6 (25.5)	−7.8 (18.0)	6.0 (42.8)
Daily mean °C (°F)	−13.3 (8.1)	−9.9 (14.2)	−4.9 (23.2)	0.5 (32.9)	5.4 (41.7)	9.4 (48.9)	11.6 (52.9)	11.1 (52.0)	6.9 (44.4)	1.2 (34.2)	−8.4 (16.9)	−12.7 (9.1)	−0.3 (31.5)
Mean daily minimum °C (°F)	−18.6 (−1.5)	−16.3 (2.7)	−11.8 (10.8)	−6.2 (20.8)	−1.8 (28.8)	1.7 (35.1)	4.3 (39.7)	3.8 (38.8)	0.7 (33.3)	−3.2 (26.2)	−13.2 (8.2)	−17.6 (0.3)	−6.5 (20.3)
Record low °C (°F)	−46.1 (−51.0)	−45.0 (−49.0)	−39.4 (−38.9)	−24.0 (−11.2)	−9.0 (15.8)	−7.0 (19.4)	−3.3 (26.1)	−5.0 (23.0)	−10.0 (14.0)	−29.0 (−20.2)	−41.5 (−42.7)	−47.0 (−52.6)	−47.0 (−52.6)
Average precipitation mm (inches)	31.6 (1.24)	16.8 (0.66)	16.7 (0.66)	11.4 (0.45)	23.6 (0.93)	36.9 (1.45)	54.1 (2.13)	48.8 (1.92)	54.1 (2.13)	47.4 (1.87)	35.3 (1.39)	42.8 (1.69)	419.5 (16.52)
Average snowfall cm (inches)	30.8 (12.1)	15.6 (6.1)	16.0 (6.3)	7.9 (3.1)	2.8 (1.1)	0.0 (0.0)	0.0 (0.0)	0.0 (0.0)	1.1 (0.4)	14.7 (5.8)	30.6 (12.0)	42.0 (16.5)	161.5 (63.4)
Average precipitation days (≥ 0.2 mm)	8.9	5.8	5.2	3.8	11.5	11.9	16.0	14.8	15.7	13.6	9.7	9.8	126.7
Average snowy days (≥ 0.2 cm)	8.8	5.4	5.0	2.8	1.5	0.0	0.0	0.0	0.32	6.1	8.7	9.7	48.32
Source: Environment and Climate Change Canada
