= Obsidian Ridge =

Coordinates: 57°26′29″N 130°37′03″W

Obsidian Ridge is a volcanic mountain ridge in northwestern British Columbia, Canada, located on the south side of Artifact Creek at the southeast end of Mount Edziza Provincial Park. It was named on January 2, 1980 by the Geological Survey of Canada for its high quality obsidian. Because of its high obsidian content, it was a source for tool making by the local Tahltan people.

== See also ==
- Mount Edziza volcanic complex
- Volcanism of the Mount Edziza volcanic complex
