= Arctic Lake Plateau =

Plateau in northwestern British Columbia, Canada

- Plateau
- Location within British Columbia
- Interactive map of Arctic Lake Plateau
- Coordinates: 57°18′00″N 130°46′00″W
- Location: British Columbia, Canada
- Part of: Tahltan Highland

The Arctic Lake Plateau, also referred to as the Arctic Plateau, is a plateau in northwestern British Columbia, Canada. It is located northeast of Arctic Lake at the south end of Mount Edziza Provincial Park.

This Arctic Lake should not be confused with the other Arctic Lakes in British Columbia, which lie northeast of the city of Prince George in a pairing known as the Arctic and Pacific Lakes, which with their adjoining mountain ranges are at the northwestern extremity of the McGregor Plateau.

== See also ==
- Mount Edziza volcanic complex
