= Yeda Peak =

Mountain in British Columbia, Canada

- Location within British Columbia

Highest point
- Elevation: 2,263 m (7,425 ft)
- Prominence: 233 m (764 ft)
- Coordinates: 57°22′52.0″N 130°40′41.9″W

Geography
- Location: British Columbia, Canada
- District: Cassiar Land District
- Parent range: Spectrum Range
- Topo map: NTS 104G7 Mess Lake

Geology
- Volcanic zone: Northern Cordilleran Volcanic Province
- Last eruption: Pliocene

Yeda Peak is a volcanic peak of the Spectrum Range on the Tahltan Highland of northwestern British Columbia, Canada, located 57 km (35 mi) southwest of Tatogga and 5 km (3 mi) south of Kitsu Peak. It is believed Yeda Peak last erupted during the Pliocene period.

== See also ==
- List of volcanoes in Canada
- List of Northern Cordilleran volcanoes
- List of mountains of Canada
- Volcanism of Canada
- Volcanism of Western Canada
