= Mess Creek =

- Mouth of Mess Creek

Location
- Country: Canada
- Province: British Columbia
- District: Cassiar Land District

Physical characteristics
- Source: Unnamed lake
  - location: Boundary Ranges
  - coordinates: 57°07′42″N 130°56′12″W
  - elevation: 1,022 m (3,353 ft)
- Mouth: Stikine River
  - coordinates: 57°53′25″N 131°12′29″W
  - elevation: 170 m (560 ft)
- Length: 110 km (68 mi)
- Basin size: 2,330 km^{2} (900 sq mi)
- Discharge
  - average: 59.3 m^{3}/s (2,090 cu ft/s)

Basin features
- Tributaries
  - left: Schaft Creek, Tudadela Creek
  - right: Crayke Creek, Dagaichess Creek, Elwyn Creek, Kitsu Creek, Raspberry Creek, Tadekho Creek, Taweh Creek
- Topo map: NTS 104G15 Buckley Lake; NTS 104G14 Telegraph Creek; NTS 104G7 Mess Lake

Mess Creek, formerly known as Mestua, is a tributary of the Stikine River in northwestern British Columbia, Canada. It flows north and northwest for about 110 km (68 mi), through a lake and a gorge to join the Stikine River, which in turn flows southwest across the Canada–United States border into Alaska where it empties into various straits of the Inside Passage. The northern half of Mess Creek forms a western boundary of Mount Edziza Provincial Park which lies within the traditional territory of the Tahltan people.

Mess Creek's watershed covers 2,330 km^{2} (900 sq mi) and its estimated mean annual discharge is 59.3 m^{3}/s (2,090 cu ft/s). The mouth of Mess Creek is located about 3 km (1.9 mi) southwest of Telegraph Creek, about 73 km (45 mi) west of Iskut and about 94 km (58 mi) southwest of Dease Lake in Cassiar Land District. Mess Creek's watershed's land cover is classified as 38.7% conifer forest, 25% barren, 15.9% shrubland, 10% snow/glacier, 8.3% herbaceous and small amounts of other cover.

== Geography ==
Mess Creek originates from an unnamed lake behind an alluvial fan at 57°07′42″N 130°56′12″W. From its source the creek flows about 45 km (28 mi) north into Mess Lake and then continues northwest for another 63 km (39 mi) into the Stikine River. About midway through its course, Mess Creek is bounded on the east by the Mess Creek Escarpment. This is a long, often cliff-like feature forming the western edge of the Mount Edziza volcanic complex. The final 12 km (7.5 mi) of Mess Creek flows through a gorge.

Mess Creek contains seven named right tributaries. The first one is Tadekho Creek which flows northwest into Mess Creek just south of Mess Lake. Kitsu Creek is the second named right tributary which flows northwest and then north into Mess Creek. The third named right tributary is Raspberry Creek which flows northwest into Mess Creek. Taweh Creek, the fourth named right tributary, flows northwest into Mess Creek west of Mount Edziza. The fifth named right tributary, Crayke Creek, flows southwest into Mess Creek off Mount Edziza. Elwyn Creek is the sixth named right tributary which flows west into Mess Creek. The seventh named right tributary is Dagaichess Creek which flows southeast into Mess Creek just south of Telegraph Creek.

Only two left tributaries of Mess Creek are named. The first one is Schaft Creek which flows north into Mess Creek on the west side of Mount Edziza Provincial Park. The other named left tributary, Tudadela Creek, flows north into Mess Creek.

== Geology ==
Mess Creek flows through a long and narrow graben-like depression bounded by steeply-dipping faults that extend to the north. A more than 24 km-long (15 mi) fault along the eastern edge of this structure shows signs of having been active contemporaneously with volcanism of the Mount Edziza volcanic complex. It has vertically displaced Holocene basalt flows by 15 to 20 m (50 to 70 ft) and older basalt flows by 91 to 122 m (299 to 400 ft), such that the western side of the fault has been downthrown. The downthrowing of this fault during the Holocene may have been due to the draining of magma chambers following eruptions at the Mount Edziza volcanic complex.

Two groups of hot springs occur along Mess Creek. The Mess Lake Hot Springs near the southeastern corner of Mess Lake have deposited massive tufa over an area of more than 120 ha (300 acres). Discharge at these hot springs may be linked to shallow hydrothermal systems driven by residual magmatic heat as they are adjacent to The Ash Pit, a recently active eruptive centre of the Mount Edziza volcanic complex. The Mess Creek Hot Springs 7 km (4.3 mi) south of Mess Lake have a recorded temperature of 42.5 °C (108.5 °F) and may be discharging from a deeply circulating hydraulic system along a major fault on the western side of Mess Creek valley.

== History ==
The historic Yukon Telegraph Trail runs along the eastern side of Mess Creek. It was built to serve the nearly 3,000 km-long (1,900 mi) Yukon Telegraph Line which was constructed by the Dominion Government Telegraph Service between 1897 and 1901 to send messages from Ashcroft, British Columbia, in the south to Dawson City, Yukon, in the north.

== See also ==
- List of rivers of British Columbia
