= Iskut River =

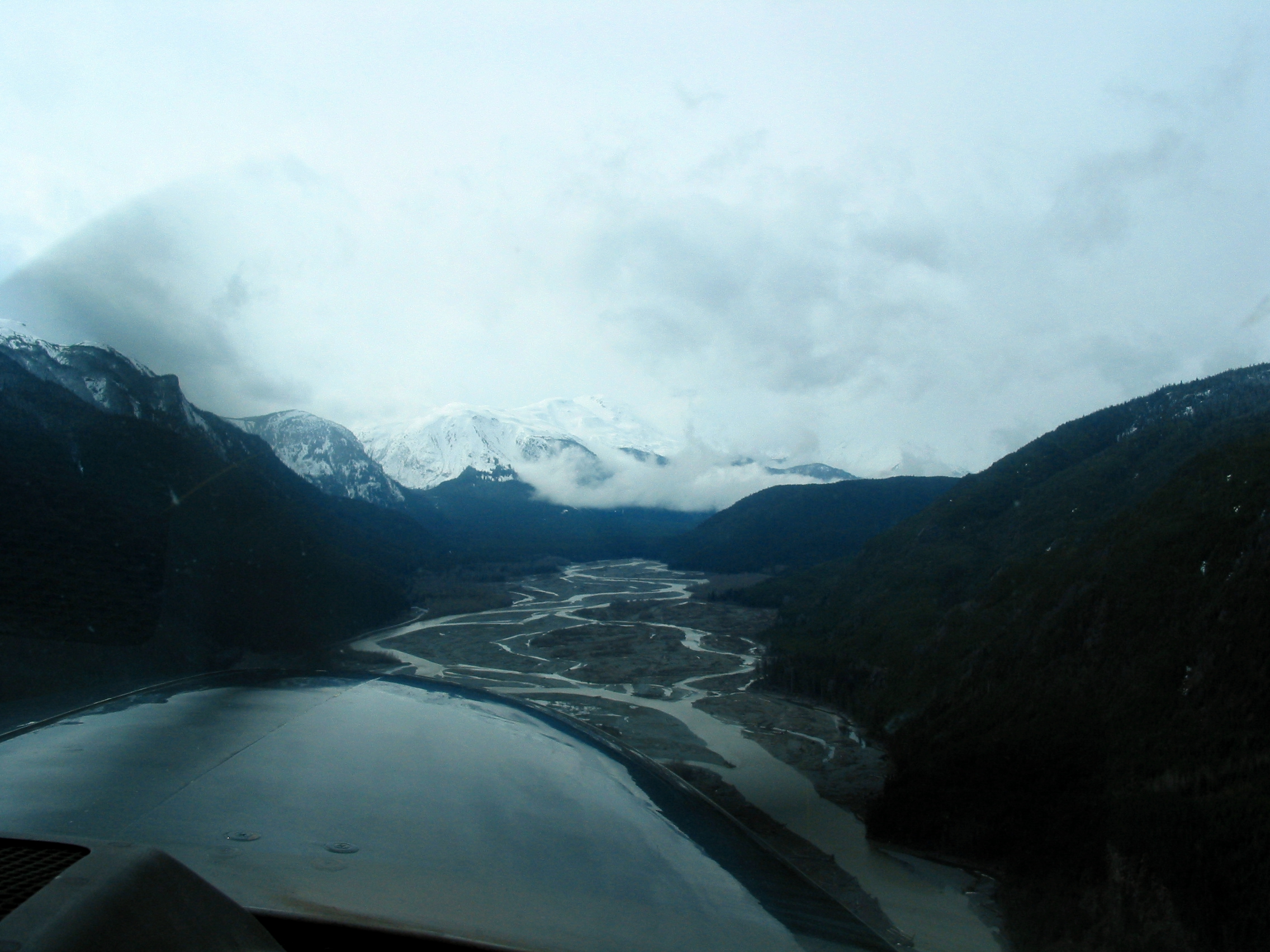
- Iskut River valley above Forrest Kerr Creek

- Mouth of Iskut River

Location
- Country: Canada
- Province: British Columbia
- District: Cassiar Land District

Physical characteristics
- Source: Kluachon Lake
  - location: Klastline Plateau
  - coordinates: 57°50′37″N 130°0′31″W
  - elevation: 846 m (2,776 ft)
- Mouth: Stikine River
  - location: Boundary Ranges
  - coordinates: 56°44′54″N 131°46′58″W
  - elevation: 14 m (46 ft)
- Length: 248 km (154 mi)
- Basin size: 9,544 km^{2} (3,685 sq mi),
- Discharge
  - average: 457 m^{3}/s (16,100 cu ft/s)

Basin features
- Tributaries
  - left: Todagin Creek, Burrage Creek, Ningunsaw River, Craig River, Inhini River
  - right: Little Iskut River, Forrest Kerr Creek, Verrett River, Twin River, Hoodoo River, Johnson River
- Waterbodies: Eddontenajon Lake, Kinaskan Lake, Natadesleen Lake, Tatogga Lake
- Waterfalls: Cascade Falls
- Topo map: NTS 104B Iskut River (South), 104G Telegraph Creek

The Iskut River, located in the northwest part of the province of British Columbia, is the largest tributary of the Stikine River, entering it about 11 km (6.8 mi) above its entry into Alaska.

From its source at Kluachon Lake the Iskut River flows south and west for about 248 km (154 mi) to the Stikine River near the border of British Columbia and Alaska. The upper Iskut flows south through a series of lakes: Kluachon Lake, Eddontenajon Lake, Tatogga Lake, Kinaskan Lake, Natadesleen Lake, and others. The middle Iskut encompasses the area between the Little Iskut River and Forrest Kerr Creek. Below the Ningunsaw River the Iskut flows southwest through a canyon and is regulated by the Forrest Kerr Hydroelectric Project, a run-of-river hydroelectric project. The lower Iskut flows west through an increasingly braided channel.

The upper Iskut is in the Klastline Plateau, a subregion of the Stikine Plateau. The middle Iskut forms the boundary between the Stikine Plateau and the Skeena Mountains. The lower Iskut flows through the Boundary Ranges of the Coast Mountains.

The Iskut River's watershed covers 9,544 km^{2} (3,685 sq mi), and its mean annual discharge is 457 m^{3}/s (16,100 cu ft/s). The river's watershed's land cover is classified as 34.6% conifer forest, 20.1% barren, 18.2% snow/glacier, 13.4% shrubland, 10.0% herbaceous, and small amounts of other cover. The mouth of the Iskut River is located about 48 km (30 mi) northeast of Wrangell, Alaska, about 140 km (87 mi) northwest of Stewart, British Columbia, and about 133 km (83 mi) south of Telegraph Creek, British Columbia. The Iskut watershed is highly glaciated and is characterized by landscapes shaped by geologically recent glaciers and the Laurentide Ice Sheet as well as volcanism.

The Iskut River watershed is in the asserted traditional territory of the Tahltan First Nation and Iskut First Nation, of the Tahltan people. The lower Iskut River is also in the traditional territory of the Tlingit, specifically the Shtax'héen Ḵwáan, commonly known as the Stikine River people.

The name of the Iskut River possibly comes from a Nisga'a word meaning "stinking", otherwise of unknown origin.

== Course ==
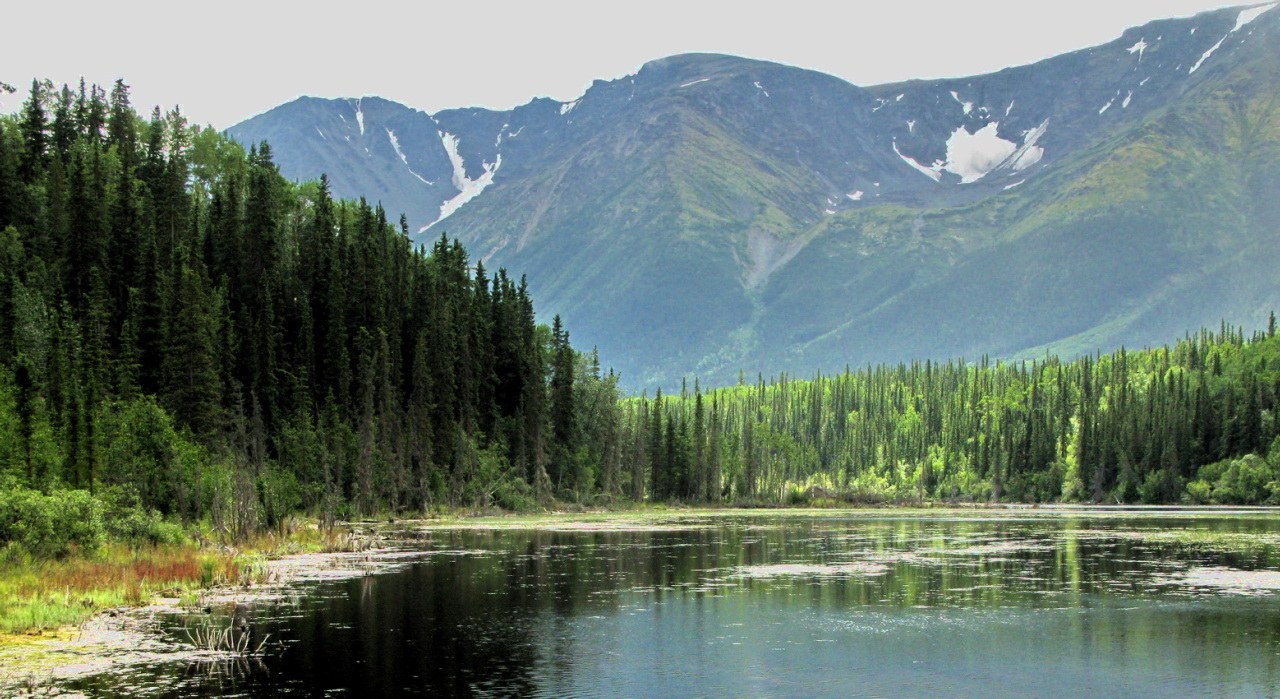
Kluachon Lake, source of the Iskut River

The upper Iskut River, defined as the portion between its source and Cascade Falls, is nearly surrounded by the Stikine River and its tributaries, including the Stikine River to the north, the Klappan River to the east, and the Klastline River to the west. Much of this region around the upper Iskut watershed is encompassed within protected areas such as Mount Edziza Provincial Park, Stikine River Provincial Park, Spatsizi Plateau Wilderness Provincial Park, and others, in a large contiguous set of protected areas known collectively as the Stikine Country Protected Areas. British Columbia Highway 37, also called the Stewart–Cassiar Highway, runs along the east side of the upper and part of the middle Iskut River.

The Iskut River originates at Kluachon Lake, near the source of the Klastline River, and about 40 km (25 mi) west-northwest of Mount Edziza. A number of small streams feed Kluachon Lake, such as Kluachon Creek. From Kluachon Lake the Iskut River flows south about 2 km (1.2 mi) to Eddontenajon Lake, joined along the way by Zetu Creek, flowing southwest from Zechtoo Mountain.

The settlement of Iskut, home of the Tahltan Iskut First Nation, is located on Zetu Creek, southeast of Kluachon Lake. The Iskut First Nation's main Indian reserve is "Iskut 6", located at the community of Iskut. The Iskut First Nation administers two other reserves, "Kluachon 1", located at the southern end of Kluachon Lake, and "Stikine River 7", near Telegraph Creek.

From Kluachon Lake the Iskut River flows south into Eddontenajon Lake, where it receives several tributaries such as Coyote Creek, which flows west from Ealue Lake. Eddontenajon Lake has an average depth of 33 m (108 ft) and a maximum depth of 67 m (220 ft). The community of Eddontenajon is located near the north end of Eddontenajon Lake, near Iskut. Just south of Eddontenajon Lake the Iskut River enters Tatogga Lake, into which several streams empty, including Jackson Creek, Kimball Creek, and Todagin Creek. Todagin Creek flows through Todagin South Slope Provincial Park, as well as the Todagin Wildlife Management Area.

South of Tatogga Lake the Iskut River enters Kinaskan Lake. Kinaskan Lake has an average depth of 57 m (187 ft) and a maximum depth of 120 m (390 ft). The Iskut exits the south end of the lake and flows into Kinaskan Lake Provincial Park, then enters Natadesleen Lake. After exiting Natadesleen Lake the Iskut River continues south. At the southern end of Kinaskan Lake Provincial Park the Iskut River tumbles down Cascade Falls, a staircase of Jurassic eroded sedimentary rocks, located about 500 m (1,600 ft) below Natadesleen Lake. Cascade Falls is an impassable upstream barrier to fish migration, blocking anadromous fish from reaching the upper Iskut watershed. Cascade Falls also marks the transition between the upper and middle Iskut River drainage basins.

Just downstream of Cascade Falls the Little Iskut River joins the Iskut River. Originating in Mount Edziza Provincial Park, the Little Iskut River is a major tributary with a watershed area of 453 km^{2} (175 sq mi), about 5% glacier-covered. Much of the lower Little Iskut River is braided. Continuing south the Iskut is joined by Three Mile Creek, then Eastman Creek. Burrage Creek, a significant tributary, joins the Iskut from the southeast, after which the Iskut begins to flow through a constraining canyon in which it is joined by Ball Creek and Durham Creek.

The Iskut flows by Iskut River Hot Springs Provincial Park. Extremely hot water, heated by magma of the Northern Cordilleran Volcanic Province, weeps out of a rocky embankment and into the Iskut River. Most of the springs are only a few metres from the river during low flows and are submerged during high flows. South of the hot springs the Iskut River is joined by More Creek, which originates in Mount Edziza Provincial Park, then Thomas Creek and Devil Creek.

Continuing south the Iskut flows along the west side of the Bob Quinn Plateau and the community of Bob Quinn Lake, on the shore of Bob Quinn Lake. Highway 37 passes through the community of Bob Quinn Lake, which is about halfway between Meziadin Junction and Dease Lake along the highway. From Bob Quinn Lake Highway 37 leaves the Iskut River and follows the Ningunsaw River and its tributary Beaverpond Creek, then crosses a pass into the Nass River watershed, where it follows the Nass tributary, Bell-Irving River.

Near Bob Quinn Lake the Iskut is joined by one of its largest tributaries, the Ningunsaw River, flowing from the southeast. The Ningunsaw River's watershed covers an area of 673 km^{2} (260 sq mi). The landscape is very mountainous with elevations up to 2,183 m (7,162 ft). About 12% of the watershed is covered by glaciers. The lower Ningunsaw is braided and has good salmonid spawning habitats, although anadromous fish are currently unable to reach the Ningunsaw. The Ningunsaw River originates in Ningunsaw Provincial Park, and flows along the edge of Ningunsaw River Ecological Reserve, which is within the river's watershed. The historic Yukon Telegraph Trail passes through Ningunsaw Provincial Park and Ecological Reserve, then runs up the Iskut River to the vicinity of the Little Iskut River, where it leaves the Iskut, passes through the Little Iskut River watershed and through Mount Edziza Provincial Park to Telegraph Creek on the Stikine River. After the Ningunsaw confluence the Iskut River turns southwest, flowing through a braided channel and receiving the waters of Estshi Creek. The braided section comes to an end as Volcano Creek joins from the east, then Forrest Kerr Creek joins from the north.

Between Forrest Kerr Creek and Snippaker Creek the Iskut River flows through the Lower Iskut Canyon, about 20 km (12 mi) long, which is carved into basaltic lava flows from Iskut Canyon Cone. McLymont Creek, flowing from the north, joins the Iskut in the canyon. Snippaker Creek, flowing from the south, joins at the end of the canyon. Three hydroelectric projects have been built in the area: the Forrest Kerr Hydroelectric Project, McLymont Creek Hydroelectric Project, and Volcano Creek Hydroelectric Project, all of which began operating in 2014. The largest is the Forrest Kerr Project, which diverts a portion of the Iskut River into a 3 km (1.9 mi) tunnel leading to an underground hydroelectric powerhouse.

The Lower Iskut Canyon is a barrier to fish migration, and the Forrest Kerr Project's diversion weir at the head of the canyon is impassable to fish migration. Thus anadromous fish are blocked from the middle and upper Iskut River watershed. There are ongoing studies to assess whether modifications to the river in the canyon and to the Forrest Kerr diversion weir could allow fish migration into the middle Iskut watershed.

The canyon marks the transition from the middle reach of the Iskut River to the lower reach, in which the Iskut flows in a highly braided channel almost directly west through the Coast Mountains. Below Snippaker Creek the Iskut is joined by the Verrett River, flowing from the north, Bronson Creek, from the south, Twin River, from the north, Craig River, from the south, Zippa Creek, from the south, Hoodoo River, from the north, Inhini River, from the south, Johnson River, from the north, and Caralin Creek, from the south. Forrest Kerr Creek, McLymont Creek, the Verrett, Twin, and Hoodoo Rivers all originate from glaciers radiating from the Andrei Icefield, which lies north of the lower Iskut River and east of the lower Stikine River. The upper Craig River flows through the Craig Headwaters Protected Area. The source of the Craig River is in Alaska.

A few kilometres below Caralin Creek the Iskut River empties into the Stikine River just north of the community of Stikine, and south of Fowler, Great Glacier Provincial Park, and Choquette Hot Springs Provincial Park.

== History ==
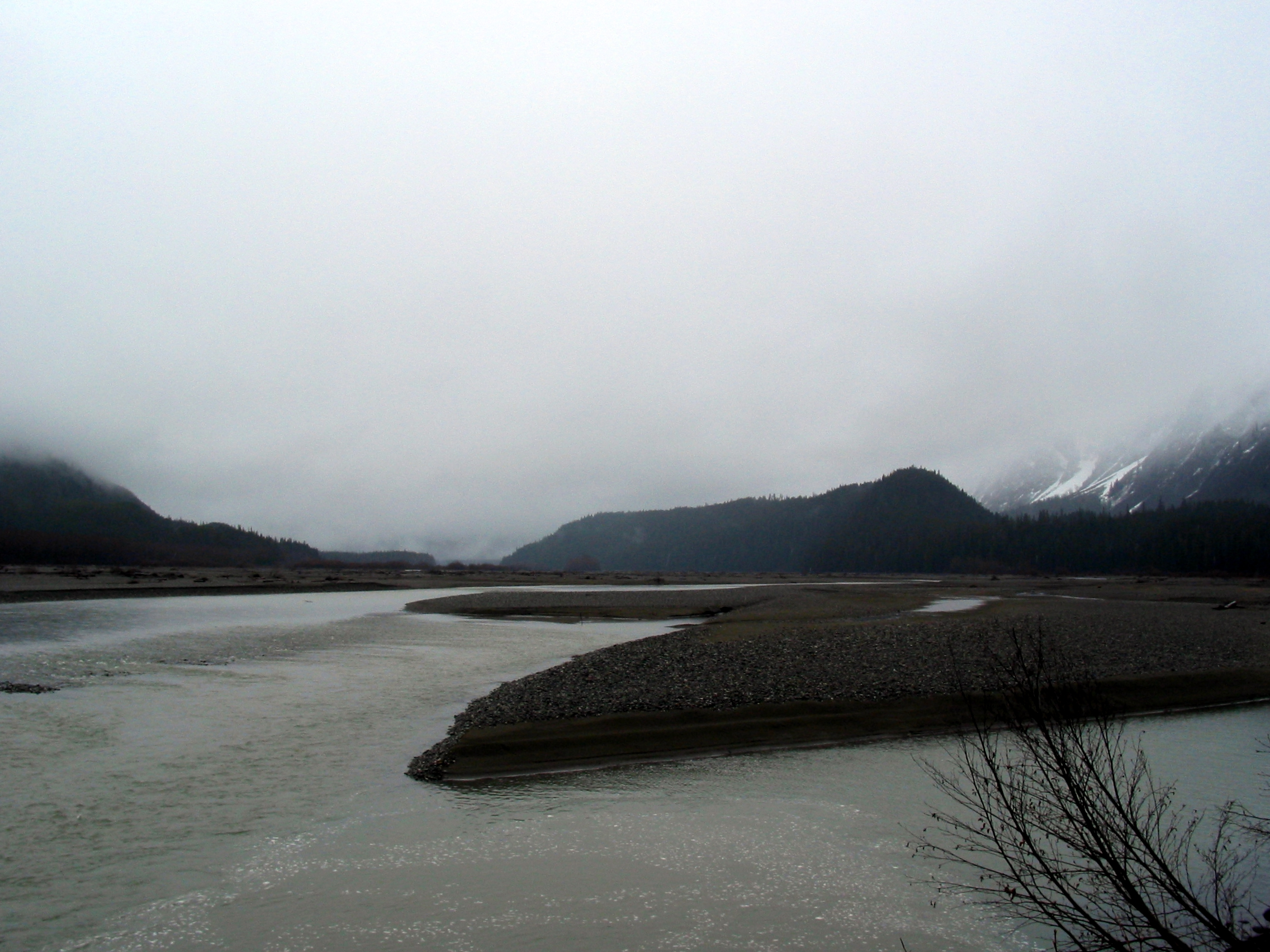
Lower Iskut River

Most of the Iskut River watershed has been part of the Tahltan peoples homeland since prehistoric times. The lower Iskut is part of a shared transitional zone between the interior plateau Tahltan and the coastal Tlingit people. In protohistoric times the Tlingit ascended the Stikine River and its tributaries, including the lower Iskut, in large canoes during the summer to dry salmon and berries. They also visited trading camps as far inland as Telegraph Creek and the Tahltan River. In the winter the Tahltan had exclusive use of the lower Iskut and Stikine for fishing, hunting, and trapping, as far downriver as the Stikine–Iskut confluence. The fishing village of Saksina was located on the lower Iskut River near the Stikine confluence. The Tahltan traded caribou and moose hides, furs, sinew, babiche, obsidian, snowshoes, and other items to the Tlingit in exchange for fish oils, dentalia and haliotis shells, knives, axes, wooden boxes, woven baskets, Chilkat blankets, and other ceremonial items.

Trade and intermarriage linked the Tahltan and Tlingit. Socially the Tahltan were divided into two exogamous moieties or clans, Tses'Kiya (raven) and Chiyone (wolf). These were further divided into three groups, sometimes also called clans. Around 1750 Tahltan–Tlingit intermarriage gave rise to a fourth group, the Nanyiee (wolf) family or band. Most of the Iskut River's watershed was inhabited by the Tahltan Tuckclarwaydee (also called "Naskoten") band of the Chiyone (wolf) clan or moiety. The Kartchottee (raven) band of the Tses'Kiya (raven) clan occupied much of the lower Stikine and Iskut Rivers.

During the maritime fur trade era of the late 18th and early 19th centuries Tlingit–Tahltan trade intensified as the Tlingit gained local monopolies on trade with Russian, British, and American trading ships. Tlingit Chief Shakes controlled trade up the Stikine and Iskut Rivers, which largely consisted of Western goods exchanged for furs. Non-indigenous people first visited the middle and upper Iskut River watershed in 1824. In 1825 the Hudson's Bay Company (HBC) and the Russian-American Company (RAC) claimed area for trapping fur-bearing mammals.

In 1838 Robert Campbell of the HBC made contact with the Tahltan from the interior, seeking to establish trading relations. But the Tahltan resented the disruption of established trading patterns and Chief Shakes had convinced the Tahltan that traders from the interior were enemies and should be killed. Campbell was forced to retreat from the region.

In the late 1830s the HBC and RAC clashed over control of the coastal fur trade in the Stikine River area. In 1839 an agreement was reached in which the HBC leased a section of the coast and gained access to the Stikine River trade. The HBC acquired an RAC outpost at present Wrangell, Alaska, and named it Fort Stikine. The Tlingit resisted the HBC's attempts to take over the Stikine River trade, forcing the HBC to suspend plans to occupy the interior.

During this period of intensified trade many aspects of the Tlingit's coastal culture spread into the interior. Diseases also spread from the coast into the interior, causing a drastic reduction in both Tlingit and Tahltan populations. Several smallpox epidemics devastated the Tahltan people, including one in 1836-38 and the 1862 Pacific Northwest smallpox epidemic.

In 1861 prospectors began to search for gold in the Stikine River basin. By 1878 most of the Iskut and Stikine River drainages had been explored by Westerners. In the early 20th century the region became a destination for recreational hunters. Hunting camps were established throughout the region. Local natives were employed as hunting guides. In the 1950s scientists began studying the area's significant wildlife ecosystems, eventually leading to the establishment of Spatsizi Plateau Wilderness Provincial Park in 1975. Many other protected areas have been established since then.

== Ecology ==
The Iskut River supports runs of anadromous salmonid fish species, including bull trout, Chinook salmon, chum salmon, coho salmon, Dolly Varden trout, pink salmon, sockeye salmon, and steelhead trout. Many other fish species are present in the Iskut watershed, including cutthroat trout, three-spined stickleback, and kokanee salmon.

Between Forrest Kerr Creek and Snippaker Creek the Iskut River flows through the Lower Iskut Canyon, about 20 km (12 mi) long, which is carved into basaltic lava flows from Iskut Canyon Cone. Below the canyon the braided portion of the Iskut River begins.

The Lower Iskut Canyon, between Snippaker Creek and Forrest Kerr Creek, is a barrier to fish migration, and the Forrest Kerr Hydroelectric Project at the head of the canyon is impassable to fish migration. Thus anadromous fish are blocked from the middle Iskut River watershed. There are ongoing studies to assess whether modifications to the river in the canyon and the Forrest Kerr diversion weir could allow fish migration into the middle Iskut watershed. Studies have shown that some sockeye and steelhead are keyed to the flow chemistry of the Forrest Kerr tailrace sufficiently to enter the power tunnel, which suggests that these fish originated above the canyon.

The Iskut River's watershed provides habitat for a large number of animal species. The upper Iskut region supports populations of wolverine, fisher, grizzly bear, Stone sheep, mountain goat, moose, woodland caribou, wolf, and hoary marmot, among many others. Among the large number of bird species found in the upper Iskut region are northern goshawk, great horned owl, yellow-bellied sapsucker, green-winged teal, blue-listed short-eared owl, and locally endangered Hudsonian godwit.

== Development and recreation ==
Since 2015 the Iskut River has been regulated by the Forrest Kerr Hydroelectric Project, a 195 MW run-of-river hydroelectric project, located at the head of the lower canyon just above the mouth of Forrest Kerr Creek. Developed by AltaGas, construction began in 2010 and was finished in June 2014 at a cost of CAD$725 million. Various contractors were involved in construction, including the Tahltan Nation Development Corporation. AltaGas signed a purchase agreement with BC Hydro to supply electricity to BC Hydro's power grid.

The project does not use a full dam and reservoir, rather a 7 m (23 ft) high weir diverts about 250 m^{3}/s (8,800 cu ft/s) of water from the Iskut into a 3.3 km (2.1 mi) power tunnel, leading to an underground power station containing turbines and generators. A tailrace tunnel returns the water to the Iskut River downstream of the powerhouse. Electricity generated by the project's substation is transmitted to BC Hydro's substation at Bob Quinn Lake via a transmission line built by AltaGas.

The Forrest Kerr Project is one of the largest run-of-river hydroelectric projects in North America. AltaGas built two other nearby run-of-river projects, the 66 MW McLymont Creek Hydro Project, and the 16 MW Volcano Creek Project, both of which began producing electricity in 2014.

The Forrest Kerr Project's diversion weir blocks fish migration. The canyon below the weir is a barrier to fish migration as well, so few fish are able to reach the diversion weir. Salmon feasibility studies have assessed the canyon, identifying obstacles that could be modified to allow fish passage, in which case the diversion weir could be modified with a fish passage structure.

The Tahltan Nation has approved and participated in the projects, and is a partial owner. Although the three projects are closely linked AltaGas has treated them as separate projects, thus avoiding the Comprehensive Environmental Assessment that would have been required, which has drawn some criticism from politicians such as Doug Donaldson.

== Tributaries ==
The main tributaries of the Iskut River, listed hierarchically in upriver order, are:

- Caralin Creek
- Johnson River
- Inhini River
- Hoodoo River
- Zippa Creek
- Craig River
  - Raven Creek
  - Sky Creek
  - Jekill River
    - Olatine Creek
  - Brunt Creek
  - Dick Creek
  - Simma Creek
  - Pounder Creek
- Twin River
- Bronson Creek
  - Monsoon Creek
- Verrett River
- Snippaker Creek
- McLymont Creek
- Forrest Kerr Creek
- Volcano Creek
- Estshi Creek
- Ningunsaw River
  - Bob Quinn Creek
  - Ogilvie Creek
  - Alger Creek
  - Liz Creek
  - Beaverpond Creek
- Devil Creek
- Thomas Creek
- More Creek
- Durham Creek
- Ball Creek
  - Chachani Creek
- Burrage Creek
  - Chismore Creek
- Eastman Creek
- Three Mile Creek
- Little Iskut River
  - Bourgeaux Creek
    - Gerlib Creek
  - Stewbomb Creek
    - Artifact Creek
- Todagin Creek
  - Tsatia Creek
- Kimball Creek
- Jackson Creek
- Coyote Creek
- Mabon Creek
- Zetu Creek
  - Summit Creek
- Kluachon Creek

== See also ==
- List of rivers of British Columbia
- Sacred Headwaters
- Iskut volcanic field
