= Walkout Creek =

- Mouth of Walkout Creek

Location
- Country: Canada
- Province: British Columbia
- District: Cassiar Land District

Physical characteristics
- Source: Near Tadeda Peak
  - location: Tahltan Highland
  - coordinates: 57°33′15″N 130°37′35″W
  - elevation: 1,730 m (5,680 ft)
- Mouth: Raspberry Creek
  - coordinates: 57°33′29″N 130°48′12″W
  - elevation: 860 m (2,820 ft)
- Length: 12 km (7.5 mi)
- Basin size: 80.9 km^{2} (31.2 sq mi)
- Discharge
  - average: 2.26 m^{3}/s (80 cu ft/s)

Basin features
- Tributaries
  - left: Flyin Creek
- Topo map: NTS 104G10 Mount Edziza

Walkout Creek is a tributary of Raspberry Creek, which in turn is a tributary of Mess Creek, part of the Stikine River watershed in northwest part of the province of British Columbia, Canada. It flows generally west for roughly 12 km (7.5 mi) to join Raspberry Creek about 5 km (3.1 mi) east-southeast of Raspberry Creek's confluence with Mess Creek. Walkout Creek's watershed covers 80.9 km^{2} (31.2 sq mi) and its mean annual discharge is estimated at 2.26 m^{3}/s (80 cu ft/s). The mouth of Walkout Creek is located about 44 km (27 mi) southeast of Telegraph Creek, about 38 km (24 mi) southwest of Iskut and about 108 km (67 mi) south-southwest of Dease Lake. Walkout Creek's watershed's land cover is classified as 34.2% barren, 25.1% shrubland, 21.5% herbaceous, 17.7% conifer forest, and small amounts of other cover.

Walkout Creek is in Mount Edziza Provincial Park which lies within the traditional territory of the Tahltan people.

== Geography ==
Walkout Creek originates at the eastern end of a valley south of Mount Edziza. From its source near Tadeda Peak, Walkout Creek flows about 6 km (3.7 mi) northwest through the valley to the southern edge of the high and relatively barren Big Raven Plateau. It then flows about 5 km (3.1 mi) southwest between the Mess Creek Escarpment to join Raspberry Creek.

Walkout Creek's only named tributary, Flyin Creek, is about 2.5 km (1.6 mi) east of Walkout Creek's confluence with Raspberry Creek. It is about 7 km (4.3 mi) long and flows northwest into Walkout Creek from near Cache Hill.

== Geology ==
Lying within the valley of Walkout Creek are the Walkout Creek centres. These are two small cinder cones in the middle of the Mount Edziza volcanic complex, which consists of a linear group of volcanoes on the Tahltan Highland. The largest cone is about 120 m (390 ft) high and was constructed on top of a slow moving landslide originating from the northern side of Walkout Creek valley. Both cones have been deeply dissected, the larger cone having been segmented into arcuate, step-like slices from continued movement of the landslide. The Walkout Creek centres and their associated lava flows are assigned to the Big Raven Formation, the youngest geological formation of the Mount Edziza volcanic complex.

== History ==
In 1954, a bush pilot from Atlin named Herman Peterson flew into the narrow valley of Walkout Creek under a low overcast. Mistaking it for Raspberry Pass, Peterson was unable to turn out of the valley and crashed into the head of Walkout Creek. Peterson survived the crash and walked his way back to Telegraph Creek. In 2004, Peterson died at the age of 90 and was a member of the Yukon Transportation Hall of Fame.

== See also ==
- List of rivers of British Columbia
