= Inhini River =

- Mouth of Inhini River

Location
- Country: Canada
- Province: British Columbia
- District: Cassiar Land District

Physical characteristics
- Source: Boundary Ranges
  - location: Coast Mountains
  - coordinates: 56°34′23″N 131°21′24″W
  - elevation: 1,270 m (4,170 ft)
- Mouth: Iskut River
  - location: Boundary Ranges
  - coordinates: 56°42′32″N 131°33′27″W
  - elevation: 25 m (82 ft)
- Length: 25 km (16 mi)
- Basin size: 135 km^{2} (52 sq mi),
- Discharge
  - average: 12.4 m^{3}/s (440 cu ft/s)

Basin features
- Topo map: NTS 104B12 Katete River

The Inhini River is a tributary of the Iskut River in the northwest part of the province of British Columbia, Canada, in Cassiar Land District. From its source in the glaciers of Simma Mountain and Mount Rastus, the Inhini River flows north for about 25 km (16 mi) to the Iskut River just east of the Iskut's confluence with the Stikine River.

The Inhini River's watershed covers 135 km^{2} (52 sq mi), and its mean annual discharge is an estimated 12.4 m^{3}/s (440 cu ft/s). The river's watershed's land cover is classified as 26.2% shrubland, 23.7% barren, 20.7% snow/glacier, 16.2% conifer forest, and small amounts of other cover.

The mouth of the Inhini River is located about 57 km (35 mi) east-northeast of Wrangell, Alaska, about 130 km (81 mi) northwest of Stewart, British Columbia, and about 135 km (84 mi) south of Telegraph Creek, British Columbia.

The Inhini River is in the traditional territory of the Tlingit, specifically the Shtax'héen Ḵwáan, commonly known as the Stikine River people. It is also in the asserted traditional territory of the Tahltan First Nation and Iskut First Nation, of the Tahltan people.

== Geography ==
The Inhini River originates in two forks near the border of Alaska. The longer eastern fork flows from the glacial meltwaters of Mount Rastus and Simma Mountain, close to the source of Simma Creek, a tributary of the Craig River. This fork flows for about 7 km (4.3 mi) before being joined by the west fork, which flows from the glacial meltwaters of Mount Fawcett, an Alaska–British Columbia boundary peak.

The mainstem Inhini River flows north between Inhini Mountain and Mount Whipple, then between Fizzle Mountain and Snowy Mountain, collecting a number of unnamed tributary streams. It becomes a braided river after entering the floodplain of the Iskut River. The Inhini River empties into a side channel of the highly braided Iskut River about 15 km (9.3 mi) east of the mouth of the Iskut, where it joins the Stikine River a few kilometres upriver of the Alaska boundary.

== See also ==
- List of rivers of British Columbia
