= Hoodoo River =

River in Canada

- Mouth of Hoodoo River

Location
- Country: Canada
- Province: British Columbia
- District: Cassiar Land District

Physical characteristics
- Source: Hoodoo Glacier
  - location: Boundary Ranges
  - coordinates: 56°47′3″N 131°21′31″W
  - elevation: 530 m (1,740 ft)
- Mouth: Iskut River
  - location: Boundary Ranges
  - coordinates: 56°42′18″N 131°20′20″W
  - elevation: 36 m (118 ft)
- Length: 10 km (6.2 mi)
- Basin size: 128 km^{2} (49 sq mi),
- Discharge
  - average: 8.82 m^{3}/s (311 cu ft/s)

Basin features
- Topo map: NTS 104B11 Craig River

The Hoodoo River is a tributary of the Iskut River in the northwest part of the province of British Columbia, Canada, located west of Hoodoo Mountain and the Twin River in Cassiar Land District. From its source in Hoodoo Glacier the Hoodoo River flows south for about 10 km (6.2 mi) to the Iskut River northwest of the mouth of the Craig River.

The Hoodoo River's watershed covers 128 km^{2} (49 sq mi), and its mean annual discharge is an estimated 8.82 m^{3}/s (311 cu ft/s). The river's watershed's land cover is classified as 49.4% snow/glacier, 22.7% barren, 10.6% conifer forest, 9.8% shrubland, and small amounts of other cover.

The mouth of the Hoodoo River is located about 68 km (42 mi) east-northeast of Wrangell, Alaska, about 120 km (75 mi) northwest of Stewart, British Columbia, and about 134 km (83 mi) south of Telegraph Creek, British Columbia.

The Hoodoo River is in the traditional territory of the Tlingit, specifically the Shtax'héen Ḵwáan, commonly known as the Stikine River people. It is also in the asserted traditional territory of the Tahltan First Nation and Iskut First Nation, of the Tahltan people.

== Geography ==
The Hoodoo River originates from the meltwaters of Hoodoo Glacier, a valley glacier that flows from the Andrei Icefield which dominates the mountains north of the Hoodoo River and from which numerous glaciers extend in all directions. This large glacial field is named after the son of Olav Mokievsky-Zubok, a glaciologist who carried out significant glaciological work in the Coast Mountains from the 1960s to the 1970s.

From Hoodoo Glacier the Hoodoo River flows south along the west side of Hoodoo Mountain and through glacial meltwater lakes, then through a coastal western hemlock forest. About 3 km (1.9 mi) north of the Iskut River the Hoodoo River is joined by its main tributary, an unnamed stream flowing southeast from the glaciers of Surprise Mountain. From this confluence of the two forks, the Hoodoo River continues south through an increasingly braided channel before emptying into the Iskut River.

== See also ==
- List of rivers of British Columbia
