= Flyin Creek =

Tribuatary river in the country of Canada

- Mouth of Flyin Creek

Location
- Country: Canada
- Province: British Columbia
- District: Cassiar Land District

Physical characteristics
- Source: Cache Hill
  - location: Tahltan Highland
  - coordinates: 57°3′27″N 130°40′6″W
  - elevation: 1,900 m (6,200 ft)
- Mouth: Walkout Creek
  - coordinates: 57°33′25″N 130°45′51″W
  - elevation: 985 m (3,232 ft)
- Length: 7.7 km (4.8 mi)
- Basin size: 16.3 km^{2} (6.3 sq mi),
- Discharge
  - average: 0.423 m^{3}/s (14.9 cu ft/s)

Basin features
- Topo map: NTS 104G10 Mount Edziza

Flyin Creek is a tributary of Walkout Creek and part of the Stikine River watershed in northwest part of the province of British Columbia, Canada. It flows generally northwest for roughly 7.7 km (4.8 mi) to join Walkout Creek, which flows into Raspberry Creek, then Mess Creek, which flows into the Stikine River about 3 km (1.9 mi) downriver from the community of Telegraph Creek. Flyin Creek's watershed covers 16.3 km^{2} (6.3 sq mi), and is entirely in Mount Edziza Provincial Park. The creek's mean annual discharge is estimated at 0.423 m^{3}/s (14.9 cu ft/s). The mouth of Flyin Creek is located about 45 km (28 mi) south of Telegraph Creek, British Columbia, about 110 km (68 mi) southeast of Dease Lake, British Columbia, and about 230 km (140 mi) southeast of Juneau, Alaska. Flyin Creek's watershed's land cover is classified as 40.3% barren, 24,2% shrubland, 19.7% conifer forest, 13.8% herbaceous, and small amounts of other cover.

Flyin Creek is in Mount Edziza Provincial Park, which lies within the traditional territory of the Tahltan First Nation, of the Tahltan people.

== Geography ==
Flyin Creek originates a few kilometres north of Raspberry Pass on the slopes of Cache Hill, about 20 km (12 mi) south of Mount Edziza.

The creek flows generally northwest through a steep valley. The upper valley is barren, the lower part is mostly conifer forest. After about 7.7 km (4.8 mi) Flyin Creek joins Walkout Creek, which flows about 2.3 km (1.4 mi) to Raspberry Creek, which in turn joins Mess Creek. Mess Creek flows north for over 100 km (62 mi) to empty into the Stikine River near the community of Telegraph Creek.

== History ==
The name Flyin Creek comes from local anecdote about an incident in 1954. A well-known bush pilot from Atlin, Herman Peterson, mistook the creek's drainage for Raspberry Pass and flew in under a low overcast. Unable to turn out of the narrow valley he crashed and made his way back to Telegraph Creek on foot.

== See also ==
- List of rivers of British Columbia
