= Ningunsaw River =

River in British Columbia

- Mouth of the Ningunsaw River

Location
- Country: Canada
- Province: British Columbia
- District: Cassiar Land District

Physical characteristics
- Source: Coast Mountains
  - location: Boundary Ranges
  - coordinates: 56°44′32″N 130°15′18″W
  - elevation: 1,450 m (4,760 ft)
- Mouth: Iskut River
  - coordinates: 56°56′22″N 130°20′52″W
  - elevation: 353 m (1,158 ft)
- Length: 50 km (31 mi)
- Basin size: 673 km^{2} (260 sq mi),
- Discharge
  - average: 24.2 m^{3}/s (850 cu ft/s)

Basin features
- Tributaries
  - right: Beaverpond Creek, Liz Creek, Alger Creek, Ogilve Creek, Bob Quinn Creek
- Topo map: NTS104B16 Bob Quinn Lake

The Ningunsaw River is a tributary of the Iskut River in the northern part of the province of British Columbia, Canada. The Iskut River is the largest tributary of the Stikine River. From its source in the Boundary Ranges the Ningunsaw River flows east, then north, then west, for roughly 50 km (31 mi) to join the Iskut River.

The Ningunsaw's watershed covers 673 km^{2} (260 sq mi). A significant part of the drainage basin near the river's mouth is within Ningunsaw Provincial Park and the Ningunsaw River Ecological Reserve. The Ningunsaw's source is in the Boundary Ranges, but part of its course divides the Boundary Ranges from the Skeena Mountains, part of British Columbia's Interior Mountains. Tributaries such as Alger Creek and Liz Creek flow from the Skeena Mountains.

The river's mean annual discharge is estimated at 24.2 m^{3}/s (850 cu ft/s), with most of the flow occurring between May and October. The mouth of the Ningunsaw River is located about 113 km (70 mi) northwest of Meziadin Junction, about 117 km (73 mi) south of the community of Telegraph Creek, about 285 km (177 mi) southeast of Juneau, Alaska, and about 585 km (364 mi) southeast of Prince George, British Columbia. The Ningunsaw River's watershed's land cover is classified as 42.5% conifer forest, 19.6% barren, 11.7% snow/glacier, 11.1% shrubland, and small amounts of other cover.

The Ningunsaw River's drainage basin lies within the asserted traditional territory of the Tahltan First Nations people.

The Ningunsaw's watershed lies in the transition zone between British Columbia's coastal and interior climate zones. It contains high quality habitat for grizzly bears, moose, and mountain goats.

Part of the historic Yukon Telegraph Trail runs through the Ningunsaw River's watershed.

== Geography ==
The Ningunsaw River originates in the Boundary Range, close to the source of the Unuk River and near the Bell-Irving River. Its tributaries flow from the high peaks near of both the Boundary Range and the Skeena Mountains. The Ningunsaw River Creek flows east, north, and west to join the Iskut River near Bob Quinn Lake.

Numerous tributary streams join the Ningunsaw River, mostly unnamed. The named tributaries in downriver order are Beaverpond Creek, Liz Creek, Alger Creek, Ogilve Creek, and Bob Quinn Creek.

Stewart–Cassiar Highway, British Columbia Highway 37, runs north along the Bell-Irving River tributaries Teigen Creek and Snowbank Creek, over Ningunsaw Pass, then along the Ningunsaw tributary Beaverpond Creek and the Ningunsaw River mainstem en route to the community of Bob Quinn Lake.

== History ==
The Ningunsaw River lies within the asserted traditional territory of the Tahltan First Nations people. The name comes from Nenh Yīge Tsa’, "Underground Beaver" or "Underground Rock".

The Yukon Telegraph, built 1898–1901, passes through the Ningunsaw's watershed and runs along part of the Ningunsaw River. The telegraph was abandoned in 1936. Today the Yukon Telegraph Trail is formally recognized by the Canadian Register of Historic Places as one of many historic sites in Canada.

== See also ==
- List of rivers of British Columbia
- Sacred Headwaters
