= Twin River =

- Mouth of Twin River

Location
- Country: Canada
- Province: British Columbia
- District: Cassiar Land District

Physical characteristics
- Source: Twin Glacier
  - location: Boundary Ranges
  - coordinates: 56°48′22″N 131°11′27″W
  - elevation: 590 m (1,940 ft)
- Mouth: Iskut River
  - location: Boundary Ranges
  - coordinates: 56°43′9″N 131°12′42″W
  - elevation: 54 m (177 ft)
- Length: 11 km (6.8 mi)
- Basin size: 203 km^{2} (78 sq mi),
- Discharge
  - average: 16.7 m^{3}/s (590 cu ft/s)

Basin features
- Topo map: NTS 104B11 Craig River

The Twin River is a tributary of the Iskut River in the northwest part of the province of British Columbia, Canada. From its source in Twin Glacier the Twin River flows south for about 11 km (6.8 mi), east of Hoodoo Mountain to the Iskut River north of the Craig River watershed. The Twin River's watershed covers 203 km^{2} (78 sq mi), and its mean annual discharge is an estimated 16.7 m^{3}/s (590 cu ft/s). The river's watershed's land cover is classified as 77.2% snow/glacier, 9.8% barren, 4.5% conifer forest, and small amounts of other cover.

The mouth of the Twin River is located about 77 km (48 mi) east-northeast of Wrangell, Alaska, about 114 km (71 mi) northwest of Stewart, British Columbia, and about 130 km (81 mi) south of Telegraph Creek, British Columbia.

The Twin River is in the traditional territory of the Tlingit, specifically the Shtax'héen Ḵwáan, commonly known as the Stikine River people. It is also in the asserted traditional territory of the Tahltan First Nation and Iskut First Nation, of the Tahltan people.

== Geography ==
The Twin River originates from the meltwaters of Twin Glacier, a valley glacier that flows from the Andrei Icefield which dominates the mountains north of Twin River and from which numerous glaciers extend in all directions. This large glacial field is named after the son of Olav Mokievsky-Zubok, a glaciologist who carried out significant glaciological work in the Coast Mountains from the 1960s to the 1970s.

From Twin Glacier the Twin River flows south through glacial meltwater lakes, then through a coastal western hemlock forest. About 3.5 km (2.2 mi) north of the Iskut River the Twin River is joined by its west fork tributary, flowing south from another lobe of Twin Glacier. This lobe surrounds the northwestern base of Hoodoo Mountain. About 6 km (3.7 mi) north the two lobes merge in the main body of Twin Glacier. Although the forks are similar in size and flow, Canadian NTS topographic maps and databases like BC Geographical Names identify the east fork as the Twin River while leaving the west fork unnamed. From the confluence of the two forks, the Twin River continues south through an increasingly braided channel before emptying into the Iskut River.

== See also ==
- List of rivers of British Columbia
