= Choquette River =

Tributary river in the country of Canada

Coordinates: 56°49′00″N 131°46′00″W

The Choquette River is a tributary of the Stikine River, flowing west into that river just north of its confluence with the Iskut. The river is named for Alexander "Buck" Choquette, discoverer of the strike which launched the Stikine Gold Rush and the first non-native settler in the region, who operated a store near here and also for a while the Hudson'a Bay Company post and border station at Stikine, then named Boundary. The Choquette Glacier, at the head of the river and its source, and Mount Choquette are nearby; Mount Johnny in the same region is named for one of Choquette's many sons.

== See also ==
- Choquette Hot Springs Provincial Park
- Great Glacier
