= Raspberry Creek (British Columbia) =

- Mouth of Raspberry Creek

Location
- Country: Canada
- Province: British Columbia
- District: Cassiar Land District

Physical characteristics
- Source: Raspberry Pass
  - location: Tahltan Highland
  - coordinates: 57°30′39″N 130°43′40″W
  - elevation: 1,409 m (4,623 ft)
- Mouth: Mess Creek
  - coordinates: 57°33′48″N 130°52′47″W
  - elevation: 652 m (2,139 ft)
- Length: 12 km (7.5 mi)
- Basin size: 129 km^{2} (50 sq mi)
- Discharge
  - average: 3.47 m^{3}/s (123 cu ft/s)

Basin features
- Tributaries
  - right: Walkout Creek
- Topo map: NTS 104G10 Mount Edziza

Raspberry Creek is a tributary of Mess Creek, which in turn is a tributary of the Stikine River in northwest part of the province of British Columbia, Canada. It flows generally northwest for at least 12 km (7.5 mi) to join Mess Creek about 6 km (3.7 mi) north of Mess Creek's confluence with Kitsu Creek. Raspberry Creek's watershed covers 129 km^{2} (50 sq mi) and its mean annual discharge is estimated at 3.472 m^{3}/s (122.6 cu ft/s). The mouth of Raspberry Creek is located about 40 km (25 mi) southeast of Telegraph Creek, about 61 km (38 mi) southwest of Iskut and about 110 km (68 mi) southwest of Dease Lake. Raspberry Creek's watershed's land cover is classified as 35.1% barren, 24.9% shrubland, 20.7% conifer forest, 16.8% herbaceous, and small amounts of other cover.

Raspberry Creek is in Mount Edziza Provincial Park which lies within the traditional territory of the Tahltan people.

== Geography ==
Raspberry Creek originates from Raspberry Pass, an east–west trending mountain pass cutting through the central portion of the Mount Edziza volcanic complex. From its source, Raspberry Creek flows north-northwest through a valley between Gnu Butte and the Kitsu Plateau. Raspberry Creek then flows northwest between the Mess Creek Escarpment where it receives Walkout Creek, its only named tributary. After receiving Walkout Creek, Raspberry Creek enters the broad valley of Mess Creek where it drains.

== History ==
The historic Yukon Telegraph Trail follows Raspberry Creek. It was built to serve the nearly 3,000-kilometre-long (1,900-mile) Yukon Telegraph Line which was constructed by the Dominion Government Telegraph Service between 1897 and 1901 to send messages from Ashcroft, British Columbia in the south to Dawson City, Yukon in the north. A former maintenance cabin at Raspberry Creek was one of many that were built every 32 kilometres (20 miles) along the Yukon Telegraph Trail.

== See also ==
- List of rivers of British Columbia
- Raspberry Formation
