= Gnu Butte =

Butte in British Columbia, Canada

- Location within British Columbia
- Interactive map of Gnu Butte

Highest point
- Elevation: 1,770 m (5,810 ft)
- Coordinates: 57°32′21″N 130°44′34″W

Geography
- Country: Canada
- Province: British Columbia
- District: Cassiar Land District
- Protected area: Mount Edziza Provincial Park
- Parent range: Tahltan Highland
- Topo map: NTS 104G10 Mount Edziza

Gnu Butte is a butte in Cassiar Land District of northwestern British Columbia, Canada. It is located southeast of Telegraph Creek on the northwestern side of Raspberry Pass. The western and southern sides of the butte are surrounded by Raspberry Creek while the eastern and northern sides of the butte are surrounded by Flyin Creek. Gnu Butte lies on the Tahltan Highland between Mess Lake and Mowdade Lake in Mount Edziza Provincial Park. It bears a resemblance to flat-topped hills in parts of Africa, hence its name.

The lower part of Gnu Butte consists of Raspberry Formation basalt flows of the Mount Edziza volcanic complex. They overlie gently dipping beds of sandstone and conglomerate of Early Tertiary age. The upper part of the butte consists of basalt, comendite and epiclastic deposits of the Armadillo Formation, another stratigraphic unit of the Mount Edziza volcanic complex. The epiclastic deposits consist of gravel and landslide debris derived from thick comenditic lava flows that form a ridge adjacent to Gnu Butte.

== See also ==
- Volcanism of the Mount Edziza volcanic complex
