= Kinaskan Lake Provincial Park =

Provincial park in British Columbia

- IUCN category II (national park)
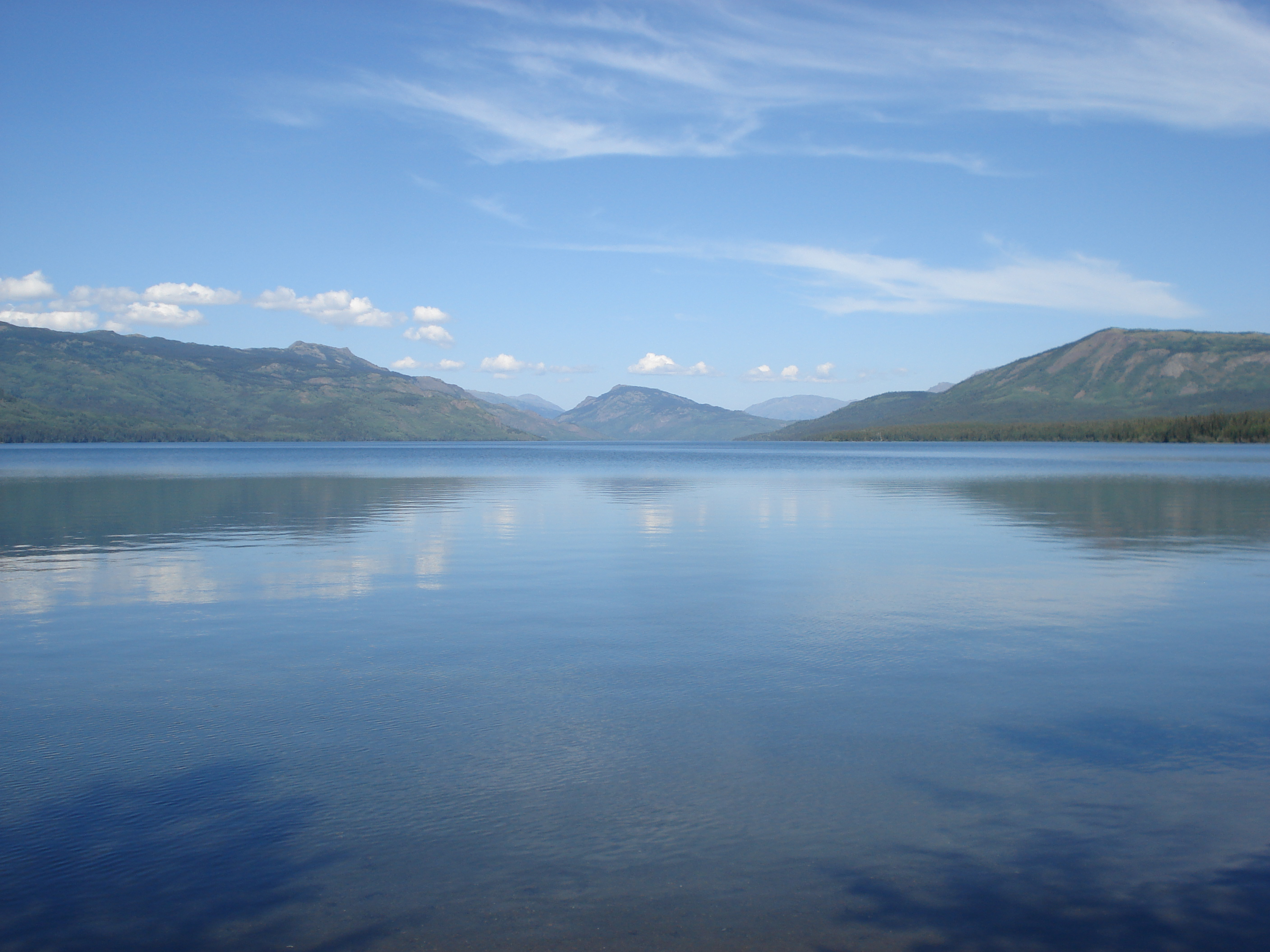
- Panoramic view

- Location within British Columbia
- Interactive map of Kinaskan Lake Provincial Park
- Location: British Columbia, Canada
- Nearest city: Telegraph Creek
- Coordinates: 57°30′14″N 130°14′04″W
- Area: 18 km^{2} (6.9 sq mi)
- Established: December 4, 1987
- Governing body: BC Parks

Kinaskan Lake Provincial Park is a provincial park in British Columbia, Canada, located at the south end of Kinaskan Lake along the Stewart-Cassiar Highway near Mowdade Lake and southeast of Mount Edziza. At the south end of the park, the Iskut River, of which the lake is an expansion, spills over 12.2-metre Cascade Falls. The park is approximately 800 ha. in size.

== See also ==
- List of British Columbia provincial parks
- List of lakes in British Columbia
