= Verrett River =

River in British Columbia, Canada

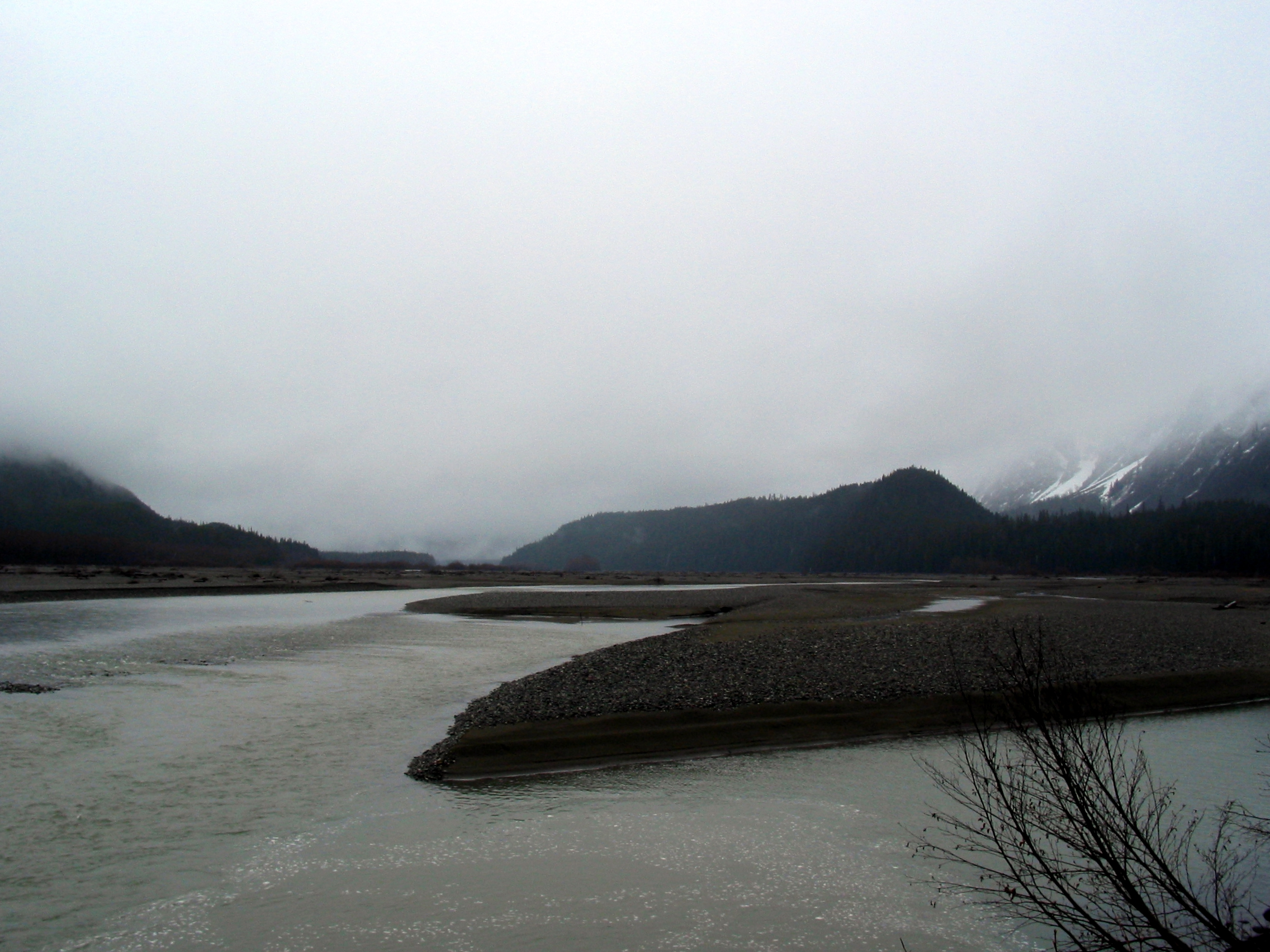
- The Iskut River near the mouth of the Verrett River

Location
- Country: Canada
- Province: British Columbia

Physical characteristics
- Source: Boundary Ranges
  - location: British Columbia, Canada
- Mouth: Iskut River
  - coordinates: 56°41′46″N 130°59′50″W
- Length: 11.8 km (7.3 mi)

The Verrett River is a tributary to the Iskut River and the Stikine River in British Columbia, Canada. It begins in the Boundary Ranges of the Coast Mountains roughly 40 kilometres (25 mi) from the Alaskan border and flows south until it meets the Iskut River, immediately east of Mount Verrett. It is remote, short, and hardly documented, and is found in an isolated part of the Cassiar Land District, east of Stikine.

== Course ==
The headwaters of the Verrett River are several unnamed glacier-fed lakes in the central Boundary Ranges immediately east of Alaska and north of the Iskut River. These drain into the Verrett River which then flows directly south for 11.8 kilometres (7.3 mi) into the Iskut River, which then enters the Stikine River and the Pacific Ocean.

== Ecology ==
=== Flora ===
The entire length of the river is found in the mountainous forests of northern British Columbia, which are home to many species of evergreen trees and ferns.

=== Fauna ===
The Verrett River is a part of a large ecosystem important to anadromous fish species. The lower reaches of the river near the mouth have been documented to have a fish presence, but the upper areas have too many natural barriers to be accessed by fish. This area, along with the larger Iskut River area, is also important to animal species such as grizzly bears, wolverines, woodland caribou, and wolves, among others.

== See also ==
- List of rivers of British Columbia
