= Craig River =

- Mouth of Craig River

Location
- Countries: Canada, United States
- Province or State: British Columbia, Alaska
- District: Cassiar Land District

Physical characteristics
- Source: Boundary Ranges
  - location: Tongass National Forest, Alaska
  - coordinates: 56°28′15″N 131°26′3″W
  - elevation: 640 m (2,100 ft)
- Mouth: Iskut River
  - location: Boundary Ranges, British Columbia
  - coordinates: 56°41′56″N 131°18′28″W
  - elevation: 40 m (130 ft)
- Length: 50 km (31 mi)
- Basin size: 737 km^{2} (285 sq mi),
- Discharge
  - average: 69.3 m^{3}/s (2,450 cu ft/s)

Basin features
- Topo map: NTS 104B11 Craig River

The Craig River is a transboundary river tributary of the Iskut River in Southeast Alaska, United States, and the northwest part of the province of British Columbia, Canada. Originating in Alaska, where it is sometimes called the South Fork Craig River, the Craig flows into British Columbia, generally in a northeast then northwest direction for about 50 km (31 mi) to join the Iskut River about 2 km (1.2 mi) east of the confluence of the Iskut and Hoodoo River. Its main tributary is the Jekill River.

The Craig River's watershed covers 737 km^{2} (285 sq mi), and its mean annual discharge is 69.3 m^{3}/s (2,450 cu ft/s). The river's watershed's land cover is classified as 30.4% snow/glacier, 30.3% conifer forest, 17.5% barren, 12.6% shrubland, and small amounts of other cover. The Alaska portion of the watershed is contained within Tongass National Forest. In British Columbia the Craig Headwaters Protected Area provides a corridor about 5 km (3.1 mi) wide around the Craig River from the Alaskan border to the Jekill River confluence.

The mouth of the Craig River is located about 70 km (43 mi) east-northeast of Wrangell, Alaska, about 118 km (73 mi) northwest of Stewart, British Columbia, and about 135 km (84 mi) south of Telegraph Creek, British Columbia.

The Craig River was named after the Canadian surveyor John Davidson Craig.

The Craig River is in the traditional territory of the Tlingit, specifically the Shtax'héen Ḵwáan, commonly known as the Stikine River people. It is also in the asserted traditional territory of the Tahltan First Nation.

== Name origin ==
The river was named for John Davidson Craig, BA, BSc, DLS, who was in charge of international boundary surveys in the vicinity of the Unuk River in 1905, the Whiting River in 1906, the Bradfield River in 1907, the Iskut River in 1908, and the Salmon River in 1920. J.D. Craig was appointed Boundary Commissioner for His Britannic Majesty, 7 May 1925. Historically the Craig River was sometimes called the South Fork of the Iskut River.

== Geography ==
The Craig River originates from glaciers in Alaska's Tongass National Forest, near the headwaters of the North Fork Bradfield River and the Katete River. It flows east, entering British Columbia between the boundary peaks of Mount Fawcett and Mount Pounder.

In British Columbia the Craig River, above its confluence with the Jekill River, flows through the Craig Headwaters Protected Area. Tributaries that join the Craig within the protected area include Pounder Creek, flowing north from Mount Pounder and Mount Alex, Simma Creek, Dick Creek, flowing southeast from Zippa Mountain, Mount Claude, Inhini Mountain, Simma Mountain, and Mount Dick, and Brunt Creek, flowing north from Brunt Mountain and Benno Mountain. At the east end of the Craig Headwaters Protected Area the Jekill River joins the Craig from the south. The Jekill originates in high glaciated mountains including Mount Alex, Mount Pounder, Mount Lewis Cass, Mount Zara, and Kalahin Mountain. The Jekill's main tributary is Olatine Creek, which flows north from Mount Zara and Olatine Mountain. After the Jekill confluence the Craig River turns north, flowing east of Seraphim Mountain. After a few kilometres the Craig turns northwest and west. It is joined by Sky Creek and Raven Creek, flowing north from Raven Mountain and Zippa Mountain, after which the Craig River empties into the Iskut River, just across the Iskut from the Hoodoo River and Hoodoo Mountain.

Many major, glaciated mountains over 1,500 m (4,900 ft) tall are found in the Craig River watershed and along its drainage divides. Among those over 2,000 m (6,600 ft) are Kalahin Mountain (2,380 m (7,810 ft)), Olatine Mountain (2,314 m (7,592 ft)), Jekill Peak (2,150 m (7,050 ft)), Mount Lewis Cass (2,078 m (6,818 ft)), and Mount Alex (2,074 m (6,804 ft)).

== Ecology ==
The Craig River's watershed supports low elevation coastal western hemlock forest ecosystems and areas providing ideal growing conditions for Sitka spruce, with trees reaching over 60 m (200 ft) in height.

The watershed provides excellent fish habitat for sockeye salmon and bull trout and is one of the main coho salmon spawning areas in the Stikine River drainage basin. Other salmonids inhabiting the watershed include Chinook salmon, pink salmon, chum salmon, Dolly Varden trout, steelhead trout, and possibly rainbow trout, cutthroat trout, and mountain whitefish, as well as cottid species such as coastrange sculpin, and prickly sculpin.

The coastal forest valley of the Craig River provides excellent grizzly bear habitat, and also supports populations of mountain goat and moose, as well as black bear, wolf, beaver, fisher, marten, wolverine, hoary marmot, and various species of rodents, bats, birds, and amphibians.

Two major inactive mine sites, the Snip Mine and the Johnny Mountain Mine, are located in the northeastern part of the Craig River watershed. Both are former gold mines.

== See also ==
- List of rivers of British Columbia
