= Annita McPhee =

Canadian tribal leader

Annita McPhee is the former three-term president of the Tahltan Nation in British Columbia, Canada. She was also named National Native Role Model by Governor-General Adrienne Clarkson in 2000 and won the Aboriginal Woman of Distinction Award.

== Education ==
McPhee attended the University of Victoria law school and Thompson Rivers University social work school. Her family placed a strong emphasis on education.

== Political career ==
McPhee was a key player in negotiating more than $2 billion in agreements for the Tahltan Nation over the Northwest Transmission Line, BC Hydro and AltaGas projects within their territory. She also helped negotiate self-determination and taxation revenue-sharing projects. She also helped secure and protect the Sacred Headwaters from coalbed methane extraction and to save the headwaters of 3 major salmon bearing rivers; the Stikine, Skeena, and the Nass.

On April 4, 2019, McPhee signed papers to seek the New Democratic Party candidacy in the Canadian federal riding of Skeena—Bulkley Valley.
