= Cascade Falls (Iskut River) =

- Interactive map of Cascade Falls
- Location: Kinaskan Lake Provincial Park, British Columbia, Canada
- Coordinates: 57°28′24″N 130°15′48″W
- Type: Tiered cascade
- Total height: 12.2 m (40 ft)

Cascade Falls is a waterfall on the Iskut River in the Stikine Country of northwestern British Columbia, Canada, to the southeast of Mount Edziza and near the Stewart-Cassiar Highway. About 12.2 m (40 ft) tall, it is located at the south end of Kinaskan Lake Provincial Park.

== See also ==
- List of waterfalls
- List of waterfalls in British Columbia
