= Tahltan Bear Dog =

Extinct North American dog breed

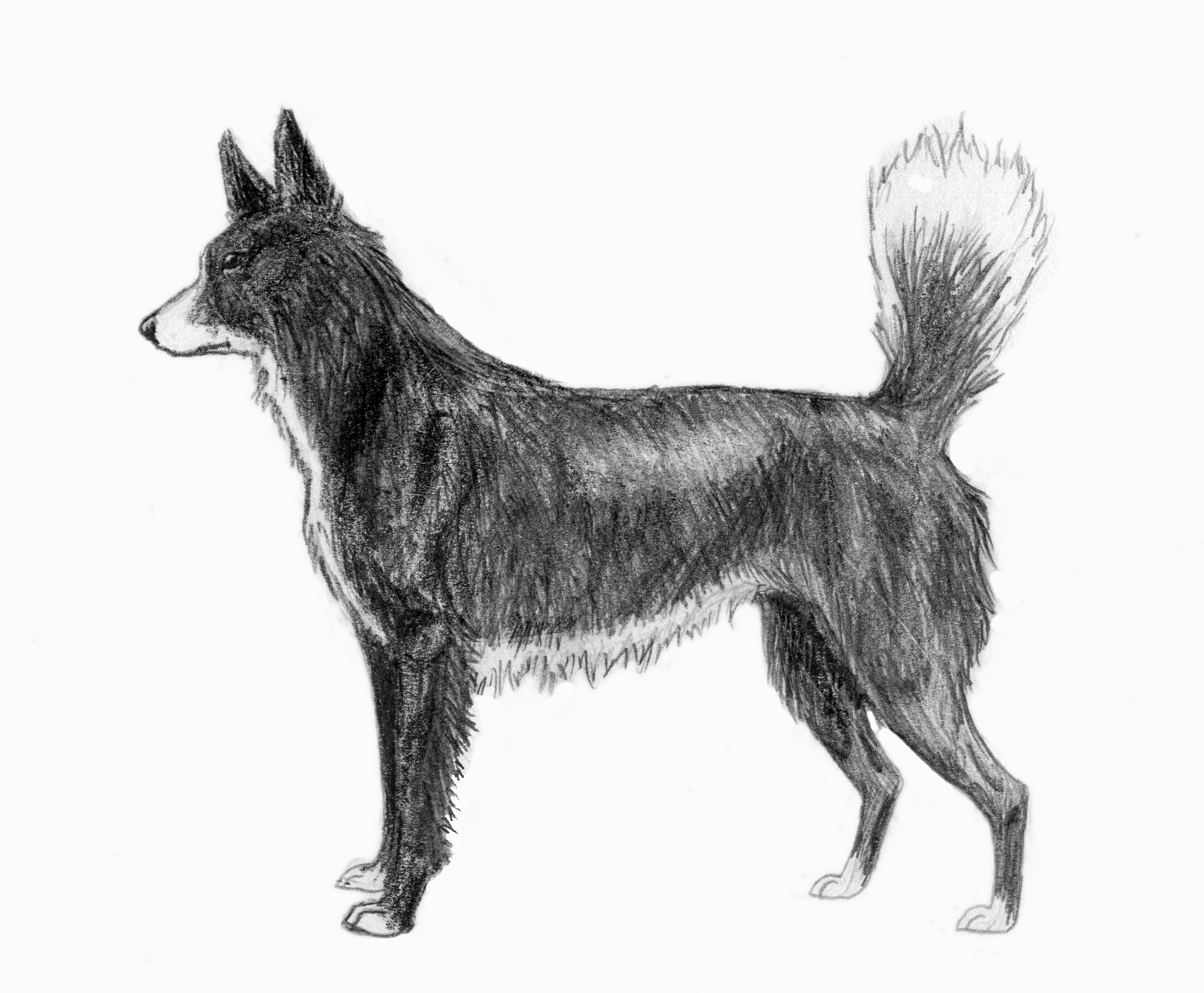
- An artist's representation of a female Tahltan Bear Dog
- Other names: Chien d'ours de Tahltan
- Common nicknames: Tahltan
- Origin: Northern Canada

The Tahltan Bear Dog was a breed of dog that came to Canada in early migrations and acclimatised to the environment.

== Appearance ==
The Tahltan was bred along and in-between the spitz and pariah races. It was conceived to be the ideal dog, athletic and agile so as to distract and harass big game.

As they were always bred solely for hunting value, their appearance could vary significantly between dogs.

=== Coat and colour ===
A Tahltan Bear Dog was primarily black and white. Weighing between 4.5 and 8 kg, it stood 14 to 17 inches high at the shoulder, with relatively large, erect pointed ears and a refined, pointed muzzle. The glossy coat was of average length, with guard hairs covering a thicker undercoat. Their paws were somewhat webbed and relatively large for the size of the dog.

Like others of their group, they had a peculiar yodel. Foxy in appearance, their main distinction among dogs is their novel tail. Short, bushy and carried erect, it has been described variously as a shaving brush or a whisk broom.

== History ==
Tahltan oral history records the presence of the Bear Dog among the Tahltan people since time immemorial, while its first documented observation was made by Samuel Black in 1824. Raised to hunt bears, the Tahltan Bear Dog was small of size but capable of hunting much larger animals. The morning of the hunt, two dogs were carried in a sack over the hunter's shoulder until fresh bear tracks were sighted. Upon release, the dogs moved lightly over the crust of snow while the bear was slowed by the deep drifts. Their fox-like staccato yaps harassed the bear into submission or confused it until the hunter could come close enough for a kill.

The Tahltan Bear Dog was friendly and gentle with smaller animals and with humans. They lived in the tent with the family, sharing bed and board.

Descended from pariah-type dogs that had come with prehistoric migrations, the Tahltan Dogs were centralized in the remote mountainous areas of northwestern British Columbia and the Southern Yukon. Their usual diet was small bits of birds, meat and fish, and they flourished in the bitter cold. However, as rifles and other hunting technology gained prominence among native populations, Tahltan Bear Dog numbers floundered. Attempts to repurpose the breed as pets were met with difficulty, as the dogs succumbed to distemper, heat prostration, and novel diseases when relocated to more temperate climates, likely due to dietary and environmental changes.

Purebred Tahtlan Bear Dogs are believed to have gone extinct sometime in the 1970s or 1980s, with the breed's last registration with the Canadian Kennel Club taking place in 1953.
