= Twin Glacier =

Glacier in British Columbia, Canada

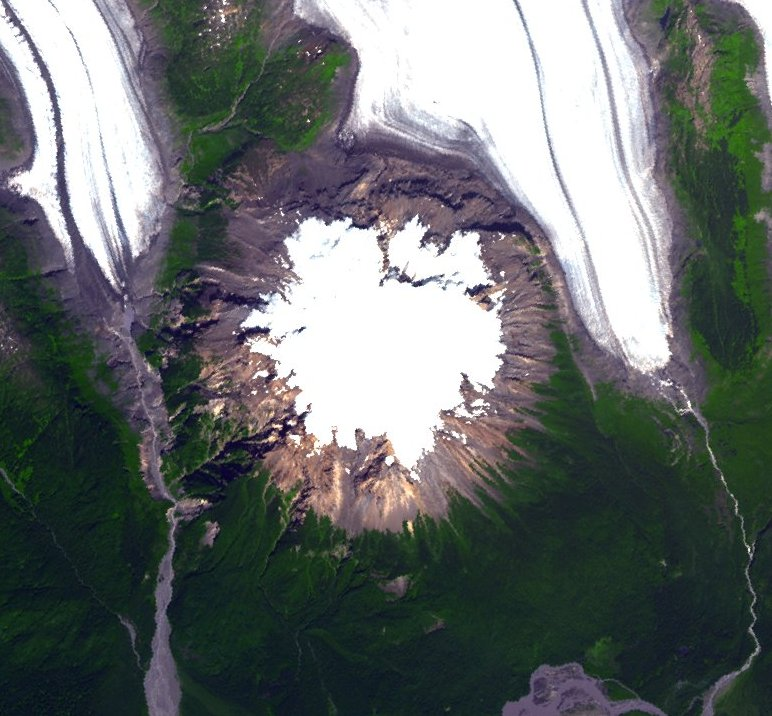
- Satellite image of Hoodoo Mountain with Twin Glacier in the upper-right corner

- Location within British Columbia
- Type: Alpine
- Location: British Columbia, Canada
- Coordinates: 56°48′29″N 131°11′29″W
- Status: Retreating

Twin Glacier is a glacier in northwestern British Columbia, Canada, located on the northern and eastern flanks of Hoodoo Mountain. It lies at the headwaters of the Twin River. The glacier originates from the Andrei Icefield.

== See also ==
- List of glaciers in Canada
- Hoodoo Glacier
