= Hoodoo Glacier =

Glacier in British Columbia, Canada

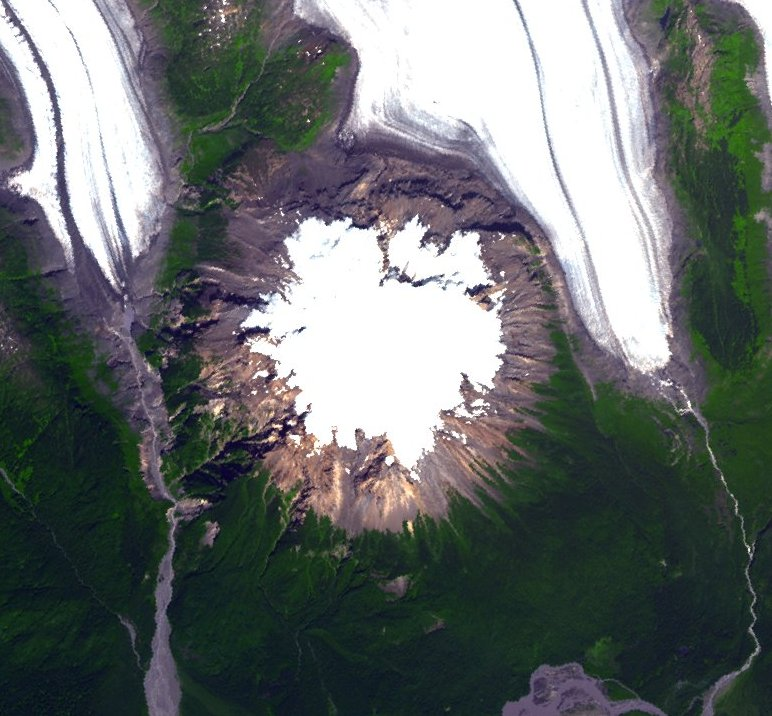
- Satellite image of Hoodoo Mountain with Hoodoo Glacier in the upper-left corner

- Location within British Columbia
- Type: Alpine
- Location: British Columbia, Canada
- Coordinates: 56°47′59″N 131°23′06″W
- Status: Retreating

Hoodoo Glacier is a glacier in northwestern British Columbia, Canada, located on the western flank of Hoodoo Mountain. It lies at the headwaters of the Hoodoo River. The glacier originates from the Andrei Icefield.

== See also ==
- List of glaciers in Canada
- Twin Glacier
