= Iskut River Hot Springs Provincial Park =

Provincial park of British Columbia

- IUCN category III (natural monument or feature)
- Location within British Columbia
- Interactive map of Iskut River Hot Springs Provincial Park
- Location: British Columbia, Canada
- Coordinates: 57.08376°N 130.3605°W
- Area: 4 ha (9.9 acres)
- Established: 2001
- Website: www.env.gov.bc.ca/bcparks/explore/parkpgs/iskut_rv_hs/

Iskut River Hot Springs Provincial Park is a 4-hectare (9.9-acre) provincial park in British Columbia, Canada, located on the western side of the Iskut River.

The extremely hot waters flowing out of the ground at Iskut River Hot Springs Provincial Park are heated by magma of the Northern Cordilleran Volcanic Province.

== See also ==
- Volcanism of Canada
- Volcanism of Western Canada
