= Andrei Icefield =

Icefield in British Columbia, Canada

- Location within British Columbia
- Interactive map of Andrei Icefield
- Location: British Columbia, Canada
- Coordinates: 56°53′34″N 131°13′52″W
- Terminus: Outflow glaciers

The Andrei Icefield is a large icefield in the Boundary Ranges of the Coast Mountains in northwestern British Columbia, Canada. It is located 130 km (81 mi) northwest of the community of Stewart in Cassiar Land District. The icefield is the source of many valley glaciers, including Hoodoo Glacier and Twin Glacier, which lie at the headwaters of Hoodoo River and Twin River, respectively. Between these two glaciers is Hoodoo Mountain, a flat-topped stratovolcano of the Northern Cordilleran Volcanic Province. Other glaciers originating from the Andrei Icefield include Andrei Glacier, Porcupine Glacier, Johnson Glacier and Choquette Glacier, the latter of which lies at the headwaters of Choquette River.

The western end of the Andrei Icefield contains several named mountains, including Mount Robertson, Pheno Mountain, Big Mountain, Mount Verrett, Surprise Mountain, Mount Turner, Mount McGrath, Mount Laura, Mount Choquette, Sugarloaf Mountain, Warm Spring Mountain, Middle Mountain, The Knob and Eagle Crag. Underlying the icefield are Triassic volcanic rocks comprising the Stikinia terrane. Uranium–lead dating has yielded crystallization ages of around 218 to 223 million years.

The Andrei Icefield is larger than the Columbia Icefield in the Canadian Rockies. It is named after the son of Olav Mokievsky-Zubok, a glaciologist who carried out significant glaciological work in the Coast Mountains from the 1960s to the 1970s.

== See also ==
- List of glaciers in Canada
