= Klastline Plateau =

Plateau in British Columbia, Canada

- Plateau
- Location within British Columbia
- Coordinates: 57°57′00″N 130°05′00″W
- Location: British Columbia, Canada
- Part of: Stikine Plateau

The Klastline Plateau is a plateau in the Stikine Region of the Northern Interior of British Columbia, Canada. A subplateau of the Stikine Plateau, it is located between the Stikine River (N), the upper Iskut River (S), Mess Creek (W) and the Klappan River (E). The Skeena Mountains are to the south, the Tahltan Highland to the west, the Spatsizi Plateau to the east, and the Tanzilla Plateau to the north, on the other side of the Stikine. The Spatsizi and Tanzilla Plateaus, and the Tahltan Highland, are also part of the Stikine Plateau.
