= Ningunsaw Provincial Park =

Provincial Park in British Columbia, Canada

- IUCN category II (national park)
- Location within British Columbia
- Interactive map of Ningunsaw Provincial Park
- Location: British Columbia, Canada
- Coordinates: 56.8389°N 130.0944°W
- Area: 15,000 ha (58 sq mi)
- Established: April 11, 2001
- Governing body: BC Parks
- Website: http://www.env.gov.bc.ca/bcparks/explore/parkpgs/ningunsaw/

Ningunsaw Provincial Park is a provincial park in British Columbia, Canada. It encompasses part of the Ningunsaw River drainage basin.
