= Craig Headwaters Protected Area =

Northwestern British Columbia along the Craig River

- IUCN category II (national park)
- Location within British Columbia
- Location: Kitimat-Stikine, British Columbia, Canada
- Coordinates: 56°33′22″N 131°13′42″W
- Area: 7,101 ha (27.42 sq mi)
- Designation: Protected Area
- Established: January 25, 2001
- Governing body: BC Parks

Craig Headwaters Protected Area is a protected area located in the Stikine Region of British Columbia, Canada. It was established on January 25, 2001 to protect the Craig River Valley from the Alaskan border to its confluence with the Iskut River.

== Ecology ==
The park protects a representative example of a Coastal Western Hemlock forest ecosystem. Giant specimens of Sitka spruce, up to 60 meters tall, are present. Uncommon plant communities are found near cool springs. The area also has some of the northernmost western red cedar in British Columbia.

== See also ==
- Lava Forks Provincial Park
