= Cache Hill =

Hill in British Columbia, Canada

Coordinates: 57°31′54″N 130°40′15″W

Cache Hill is a hill in Mount Edziza Provincial Park of Cassiar Land District in British Columbia, Canada. Is is located on the northern side of Raspberry Pass southeast of the community of Telegraph Creek. Once used as an airdrop for food and supplies by the Geological Survey of Canada, hence its name. Cache Hill is part of the Ice Peak Formation of the Mount Edziza volcanic complex and has been described as a cinder cone or a small composite cone.

== See also ==
- List of volcanoes in Canada
- List of Northern Cordilleran volcanoes
- Volcanism of Canada
- Volcanism of Western Canada
