= Tahltan Nation =

First Nations organization in Canada

The Tàłtàn Nation is a tribal council–type organization (but not a tribal council) combining the governments of two band governments of the Tahltan people in the Stikine Country of the Northern Interior of British Columbia, Canada. The two member governments are the Iskut First Nation and the Tahltan First Nation, which is also known as the Tahltan Indian Band. The Tahltan Nation is governed by the Tahltan Central Council, which is composed of representatives of 10 families from each band and has its offices at Dease Lake and Telegraph Creek.

== Declaration of the Tàłtàn Tribe ==
In 1910, Nanok, Chief of the Tàłtàns and eighty other members drafted the 1910 Declaration of the Tàłtàn Tribe. This document declares the rights, desires, and claims of the Tàłtàn peoples and is signed October 18, 1910.

== Organization ==
The British Columbia Government Aboriginal Relations and Reconciliation webpage describes the status of the Tahltan Nation as follows:

The overarching Tahltan Central Council (with offices at Dease Lake) is comprised of representatives of 10 families from each band. The TCC links the Tahltan bands and has represented them on issues of joint concern, specifically on asserted inherent rights and titles. Neither the Tahltan Indian Band nor the Iskut First Nation are affiliated with a tribal council and are recognized as separate, unaffiliated Indian bands by Indian and Northern Affairs Canada. However, the TCC is a registered society under the B.C. Society Act.

The Tahltan nation has two clans, Wolf and Crow.

The Tahltan nation also has managed to get mining operations off their lands thanks to The TCG president Chad Day. Such as the company that owns Jade Fever.

There are two active mines on the Tahltan territory, they are the Red Chris mine and the Brucejack mine.

== Past Leaders ==
- Annita McPhee, 3-term president Tahltan Central Government

Band chiefs

- Richard McLean, 2010–2016
- Terry Brow, 2016–2018
- Rick Mclean, 2018–2020
- Carmen Mcphee, 2020–2024

== See also ==
- Sacred Headwaters
- Skeena Watershed Conservation Coalition
- List of tribal councils in British Columbia
