= Great Glacier Provincial Park =

Provincial park in British Columbia, Canada

- IUCN category II (national park)
- Location within British Columbia
- Interactive map of Great Glacier Provincial Park
- Location: Kitimat-Stikine, British Columbia, Canada
- Nearest town: Wrangell, Alaska
- Coordinates: 56°50′00″N 131°50′00″W
- Area: 9,300 ha (36 sq mi)
- Established: January 25, 2001
- Governing body: BC Parks

Great Glacier Provincial Park is a provincial park in the Stikine Country region of British Columbia, Canada. It was established on January 25, 2001 to protect Great Glacier and the surrounding mountainous terrain. The park lies in the traditional territory of the Tahltan First Nation about 120 kilometres (75 mi) south of the Tahltan community of Telegraph Creek.

The park has a primitive campground with tent sites, tables, fire pits, an outhouse, a food locker, and rigging to hang food. The campground is accessible from the Stikine River immediately downriver from where the glacial outflow drainage enters the Stikine. There is a hiking trail leading from the campground to the glacial outwash lake.

== History ==
According to the legends of the Tahltan and Tlingit First Nations, Great Glacier once spanned the entire width of the Stikine River to meet the toe of Choquette Glacier on the eastern side of the valley. The glacier was also the site of the last major battle between the Tahltan and Tlingit First Nations many generations ago.

== Geography ==
Great Glacier Park is located in the Boundary Ranges of British Columbia between the lower Stikine River and the Canada–United States border with Alaska. Immediately across the river from Great Glacier Park is Choquette Hot Springs Provincial Park, which protects a collection of hot springs and associated wetlands.

== See also ==
- Stikine, British Columbia

Great Glacier, as seen from across the lake in Great Glacier Provincial Park in British Columbia, Canada, with tops of floating icebergs are visible in the foreground.
