= Bob Quinn Lake =

- Locality
- Location of Bob Quinn Lake in British Columbia
- Coordinates: 56°58′20″N 130°14′50″W
- Country: Canada
- Province: British Columbia
- Time zone: UTC−07:00 (PT)
- Highways: Highway 37

Bob Quinn Lake is an unincorporated community in northwestern British Columbia, Canada. Previously owned and operated by the Mitchell family who sold and moved to Carstairs. It is located along the Stewart-Cassiar Highway (Highway 37) along Bob Quinn Lake, about 292 kilometres (181 mi) north of Kitwanga and 192 kilometres (119 mi) south of Dease Lake. Both the locality and the lake are named after Robert Quinn, an area old timer and one-time lineman on the Yukon Telegraph Line.

== Climate ==
Climate data for Bob Quinn Lake, elevation 610 m (2,000 ft), (1971–2000)
Month	Jan	Feb	Mar	Apr	May	Jun	Jul	Aug	Sep	Oct	Nov	Dec	Year
Record high °C (°F)	8.5 (47.3)	10.5 (50.9)	16.0 (60.8)	23.0 (73.4)	30.0 (86.0)	31.0 (87.8)	32.0 (89.6)	32.5 (90.5)	25.0 (77.0)	19.5 (67.1)	8.5 (47.3)	5.0 (41.0)	32.5 (90.5)
Mean daily maximum °C (°F)	−5.2 (22.6)	−2.1 (28.2)	4.7 (40.5)	9.9 (49.8)	14.8 (58.6)	18.5 (65.3)	20.4 (68.7)	19.7 (67.5)	14.4 (57.9)	7.4 (45.3)	−0.9 (30.4)	−5.8 (21.6)	8.0 (46.4)
Daily mean °C (°F)	−8.5 (16.7)	−6.4 (20.5)	−0.3 (31.5)	3.9 (39.0)	8.2 (46.8)	11.9 (53.4)	14.1 (57.4)	13.4 (56.1)	9.3 (48.7)	3.9 (39.0)	−3.7 (25.3)	−8.8 (16.2)	3.1 (37.6)
Mean daily minimum °C (°F)	−11.7 (10.9)	−10.7 (12.7)	−5.3 (22.5)	−2.2 (28.0)	1.5 (34.7)	5.3 (41.5)	7.8 (46.0)	7.1 (44.8)	4.2 (39.6)	0.4 (32.7)	−6.4 (20.5)	−11.8 (10.8)	−1.8 (28.7)
Record low °C (°F)	−36.0 (−32.8)	−35.5 (−31.9)	−28.5 (−19.3)	−14.0 (6.8)	−5.5 (22.1)	−3.0 (26.6)	0.0 (32.0)	−1.0 (30.2)	−5.5 (22.1)	−23.0 (−9.4)	−34.5 (−30.1)	−37.0 (−34.6)	−37.0 (−34.6)
Average precipitation mm (inches)	59.8 (2.35)	41.4 (1.63)	27.1 (1.07)	25.4 (1.00)	28.7 (1.13)	33.6 (1.32)	56.7 (2.23)	49.7 (1.96)	86.4 (3.40)	101.8 (4.01)	62.1 (2.44)	69.0 (2.72)	641.7 (25.26)
Average snowfall cm (inches)	40.8 (16.1)	28.1 (11.1)	13.6 (5.4)	7.0 (2.8)	0.5 (0.2)	0.1 (0.0)	0.0 (0.0)	0.0 (0.0)	0.4 (0.2)	7.8 (3.1)	27.9 (11.0)	52.3 (20.6)	178.5 (70.5)
Average precipitation days (≥ 0.2 mm)	16.3	13.1	13.1	11.9	13.3	14.7	15.5	14.9	18.4	19.8	17.4	16.6	185
Average snowy days (≥ 0.2 cm)	13.8	10.4	8.6	5.0	0.44	0.06	0.0	0.0	0.13	3.1	12.2	14.6	68.33
Source: Environment and Climate Change Canada
