= Iskut =

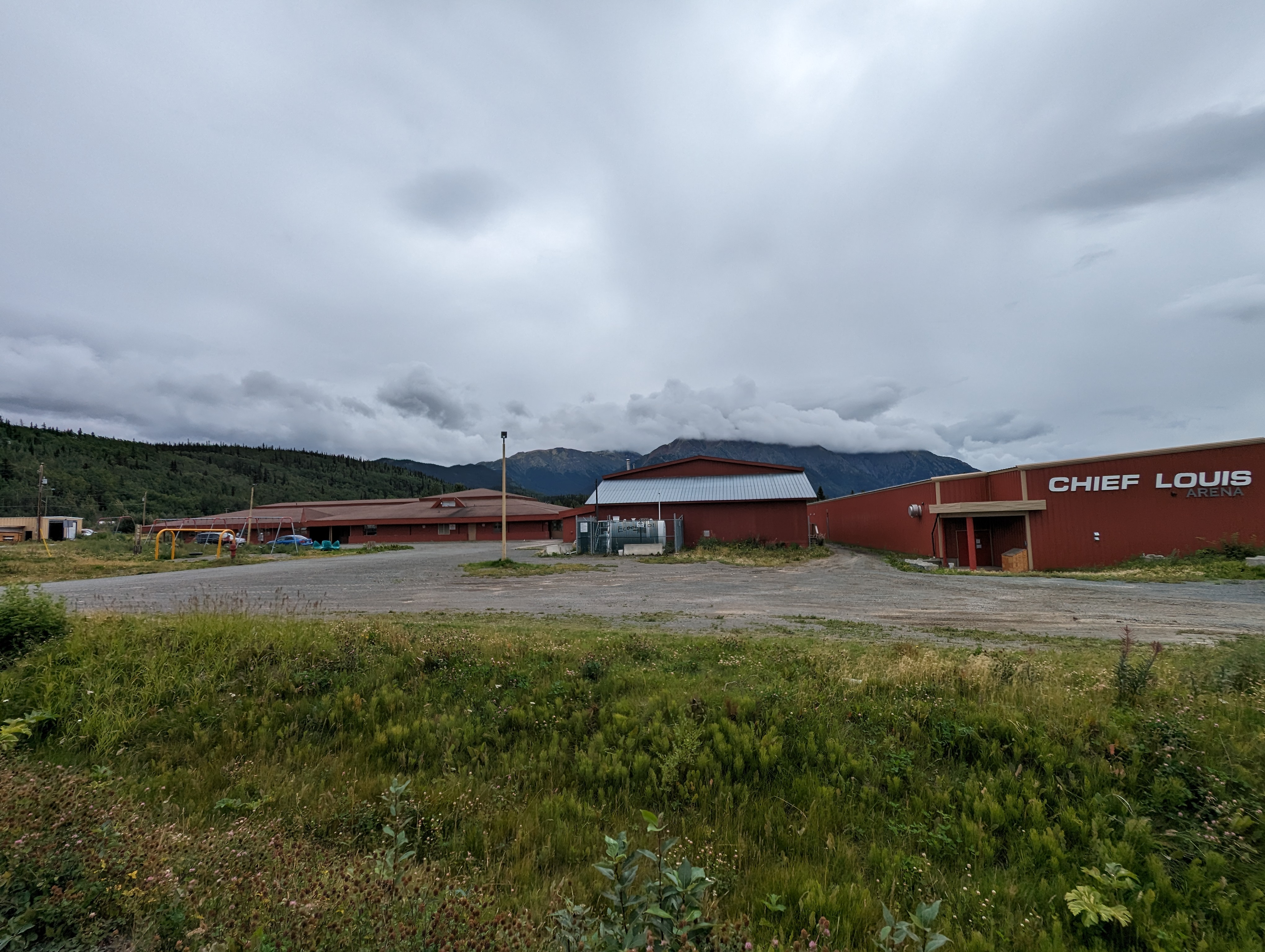

- Location of Iskut in British Columbia
- Coordinates: 57°50′15″N 129°59′20″W
- Country: Canada
- Province: British Columbia
- Regional district: Kitimat–Stikine

Area
  - Total: 0.58 km^{2} (0.22 sq mi)

Population (2021)
  - Total: 275
  - Density: 507.3/km^{2} (1,314/sq mi)
- Time zone: UTC−07:00 (PT)
- Area codes: 250, 778

Iskut is a small, mostly Indigenous community in the Stikine Country of northwestern British Columbia. It is located on Highway 37, at the north end of Eddontenajon Lake just south of Dease Lake and the crossing of the Stikine River.

== Community ==
Iskut is the home of Iskut First Nation, a group of the Tahltan people, which also includes the communities of Dease Lake and Telegraph Creek. Two bands comprise the Tahltan Nation, the Iskut First Nation and the Tahltan First Nation or Tahltan Indian Band. Iskut Indian Reserve No. 6 and Kluachon Lake Indian Reserve No. 1 are the two formal Indian reserves in the vicinity.

Klappan Independent Day School, the Iskut First Nation Band Office and the Iskut Valley Health Services building are the primary public service amenities. Shopping and gas can be purchased at Kluachon Center.

== Location ==
Iskut is located at the 407 km mark on Highway 37 and is approximately 6–7 hours from both Terrace and Smithers and within 9 hours drive from Whitehorse, Yukon.

== Recreation ==
Recreational activities in the area include fishing at any of the lakes of the Iskut Chain Lakes, which include, moving south to north, Nadatadasleen Lake, Kinaskan Lake, Tattoga Lake, Eddontenajon Lake and Kluachon Lake. Snowmobiling and ATVing are very popular activities for locals of the area.

== Resource Development ==
The opening of Highway 37 through the Iskut area has supported new resource development. Ongoing mining and energy projects include the Red Chris copper and gold mine, and the Volcano Creek hydroelectric project.

=== Coal-bed methane conflict ===
Iskut is well known for the protracted disagreement over the use of the area for resource extraction. The rapid expansion of mining throughout the area has given rise to much controversy over the level of consultation given to local First Nations' people. Of particular public interest has been Royal Dutch Shell's plans for coalbed methane extraction on the Klappan Plateau, the Tahltan people's traditional hunting and trapping territory.

Klappan has been named the Sacred Headwaters because it forms the headwaters of several significant salmon rivers, including the Skeena, Spatsizi and Stikine rivers. The Spatsizi Plateau region has occasionally called the "Serengeti of the North" due to the diversity and number of different species that call the area home. The controversy over Sacred Headwaters is also further complicated by the different levels of Tahltan government.

The Tahltan Central Council (TCC) speaks for the entire Tahltan First Nation but between the three significant communities, some people feel that TCC does not fairly represent the feelings of all communities equally. At the forefront of the battle over the Sacred Headwaters is a group of Iskut First Nation members called the "Klabona Keepers".

== See also ==
- Todagin Wildlife Management Area
