= Choquette Hot Springs Provincial Park =

Provincial park and thermal springs in British Columbia, Canada

- IUCN category III (natural monument or feature)
- Location within British Columbia
- Interactive map of Choquette Hot Springs Provincial Park
- Location: Kitimat-Stikine, British Columbia, Canada
- Nearest town: Wrangell, Alaska
- Coordinates: 56°49′58″N 131°45′25″W
- Area: 52 ha (130 acres)
- Established: January 25, 2001
- Governing body: BC Parks

Choquette Hot Springs Provincial Park is a provincial park located in the Stikine Country region of British Columbia, Canada. It was established on January 25, 2001, to protect Stikine River Hot Springs, the largest hot springs on the Canadian side of the lower Stikine River.

The park lies in the traditional territory of the Tahltan First Nation about 120 kilometres (75 mi) south of the Tahltan community of Telegraph Creek.

== Geography ==
The park is located on the eastern banks of the Stikine River, just north of the river's confluence with the Choquette River. Despite the park's name, the official name of the hot springs is Stikine River Hot Springs.

== Geology ==
The Stikine River Hot Springs are a collection of over 15 individual hot springs that emerge out from the granitic rocks at the base of the valley wall, or from mud just beyond the valley floor. Many of these hot springs are within a tidally-influenced area and are underwater at high tides. At least four hot springs remain above the high tide and beaver pond flooding.

These hot springs range in temperature from 50 to 60 °C (122 to 140 °F). The water is odourless and tasteless, with a low mineral content.

== Activities ==
Choquette Hot Springs Park features no facilities but allows backcountry or "walk-in" camping. The park is accessible by boat on the Stikine River, or by helicopter. The hot springs are difficult to access due to extensive mud areas and the absence of any developed pools.

== See also ==
- Stikine, British Columbia
- Craig Headwaters Protected Area
