= Skeena Watershed Conservation Coalition =

The Skeena Watershed Conservation Coalition is a non-governmental organization based in British Columbia which opposes Royal Dutch Shell's Klappan Coalbed Methane Project It was founded in 2004.

== Mission Statement ==
"To cultivate a sustainable future from a sustainable environment rooted in our culture and a thriving wild salmon ecosystem in the Skeena watershed."

"Our Ancestors are the land. We are our ancestors. What we do to the land we do to ourselves. Let us love and protect." - Roy Henry Vickers, previous SWCC Board Member

== SWCC's Position ==
- Support sustainable economic development, provided that environmental protection is ensured.
- Oppose development projects that threaten culture, livelihoods, and the environment.
- Oppose industrial projects such as LNG (liquefied natural gas) that may harm the habitat of wild salmon.
- Pay attention to the real impact of government investments on the local economy.

== Government Funds Received (Available on the official government website) ==
- 2011, allocated $8,000
- 2016, allocated $15,300
- 2021, allocated $160,842
- 2021, allocated $136,821
- 2024, allocated $166,700

== Achievements in promoting local environmental justice ==
=== 2016- ===
- SWCC has successfully established connections with the government and participated in environmental negotiations.
- The organization has been invited to help set environmental protection goals, such as aquatic habitat conservation and cultural heritage management.
- SWCC continues to collaborate with coastal Indigenous communities.
- It organizes educational activities, workshops, legal conferences, and field visits.
- The organization emphasizes and applies visual arts and communication strategies in environmental protection movements.

=== 2017- ===
- The BC provincial government reached an agreement with the Tahltan First Nation to designate 76,500 hectares of land as an "Industrial Development-Free Zone," known as the Klabona Plan.
- The cancellation of Pacific Northwest Liquefied Natural Gas was a major environmental victory for SWCC, successfully preventing a potential threat to the Skeena River estuary.
- Organized the 20th anniversary commemoration of the Delgamuukw/Gisday’wa case, highlighting its lasting impact on Indigenous communities.

=== 2020- ===
- We are focused on sustainable economic development, food security and sustainable agriculture, and through these projects we are ahead of the challenges of the 2020 pandemic.

=== 2021- ===
- Launched the Peace & Unity movement, which established a vital support network to amplify Indigenous voices and hold elected officials accountable for their actions.
  - The core themes of the conference included:
    - Strengthening community relationships and fostering alliances to collectively address the climate crisis.
    - Upholding and promoting Indigenous sovereignty.
    - Addressing police violence related to large-scale industrial projects.
- The Community Economic Development (CED) 2021 program has made important progress, establishing strategic planning and practical operational foundations on several fronts.
- The plan is to declare the Gwininitxw Area an Indigenous Protected Area, to be officially recognised under Gitxsan law, and to invite community members and local politicians to witness.

=== 2022- ===
- In 2022, SWCC advanced the CED framework with decolonization at its core, integrating Gitxsan Indigenous knowledge to create sustainable local economic models.
- The Peace & Unity movement has become a trusted brand, emphasizing community connections and shared values.
- Organized the 25th anniversary commemoration of the Delgamuukw/Gisday’wa case, highlighting its lasting impact on Indigenous communities.
- Gidimt’en launched a territorial monitoring program to track cultural resources and establish an ecological database.
- The documentary The Klabona Keepers tells the story of the Klabona guardians on Tahltan territory and has received high recognition at multiple film festivals.

=== 2023- ===
- Fabulous Female Funders Trip
  - Funders can directly observe and learn, strengthening relationships with Wilp and Clan communities.
  - Facilitate long-term funding partnerships to enhance support for Indigenous-led projects.
  - Provide knowledge sharing and capacity building to help funders better understand Indigenous governance and environmental protection needs.
  - Through citizen environmental monitoring, expose Coastal GasLink pipeline's environmental violations and drive policy change and community education.
  - In the future, SWCC will continue to expand the citizen environmental monitoring system and strengthen collaboration with the government, communities, and funders to promote the sustainable development of the Skeena watershed.
- Bioremediation Intensive
  - Fungal remediation technology centered on Turkey Tail Mushroom is used to treat contaminated soil and water sources.
- Policy breakthrough: Delete the clause "Environmental protection without unduly reducing the supply of wood."
- The Field School project has helped the SWCC discover a richer cultural heritage than the government and PRGT consultants and has driven deeper archaeological research. SWCC plans to continue training in 2024 to ensure that cultural heritage is protected!
- Wet’suwet’en Advocacy, Environmental Stewardship, and Government Accountability
  - Raised demands for government and corporate accountability at the RBC AGM (Royal Bank of Canada Annual General Meeting).
  - Submitted a report to the United Nations on Canada and British Columbia’s violations of Indigenous rights.
  - Successfully persuaded some investors to divest, weakening financial support for the Coastal GasLink (CGL) project.
  - Dini ze’ Woos and Dini ze’ Na’Moks Represent Wet’suwet’en on the International Stage
    - 15 September – Delivered a petition at MoMA in New York.
    - 17 September – Gave a speech at the 70,000-person climate rally.
    - 18 September – Submitted demands directly to KKR, a major investor in Coastal GasLink (CGL).
