= Stikine, British Columbia =

Stikine
- Location of Stikine in British Columbia
- Coordinates: 56°42′00″N 131°48′00″W
- Country: Canada
- Province: British Columbia
- Area codes: 250, 778

Stikine, also known formerly as Boundary, is an unincorporated locality and former customs post on the Stikine River, located on the Canadian side of the British Columbia-Alaska boundary on the Stikine River's west (right) bank. The customs post was seasonal and operated in the summer months only. The name Boundary was in use from 1930 to 1964, with designation "Customs Post" changed in 1955 to "locality".

== See also ==
- Stikine Country
- Stikine Gold Rush
- Stikine Region
- Fort Stikine
- Choquette Hot Springs Provincial Park
- Great Glacier Provincial Park
- Boundary Falls, British Columbia (also known as Boundary)
