= Iskut First Nation =

First Nation in British Columbia, Canada

Iskut First Nation is a band government of the Tahltan people. Their main reserve is Iskut IR No.6, located at Iskut, British Columbia; Iskut is in the same vicinity, while the band's third reserve, Stikine River IR No. 7 is located one mile west of, and on the opposite side of the Stikine River from, the community of Telegraph Creek. The Iskut First Nation is one of two member bands of the Tahltan Nation, the other member band being the Tahltan First Nation, also known as the Tahltan Indian Band.

== Reserves ==
Reserves under the band's administration are:

- Iskut IR No.6
- Kluachon IR No.1
- Stikine River IR No.7

== See also ==
- Tahltan First Nation
- Sacred Headwaters
