= Tahltan =

First Nations people native to northern British Columbia, Canada

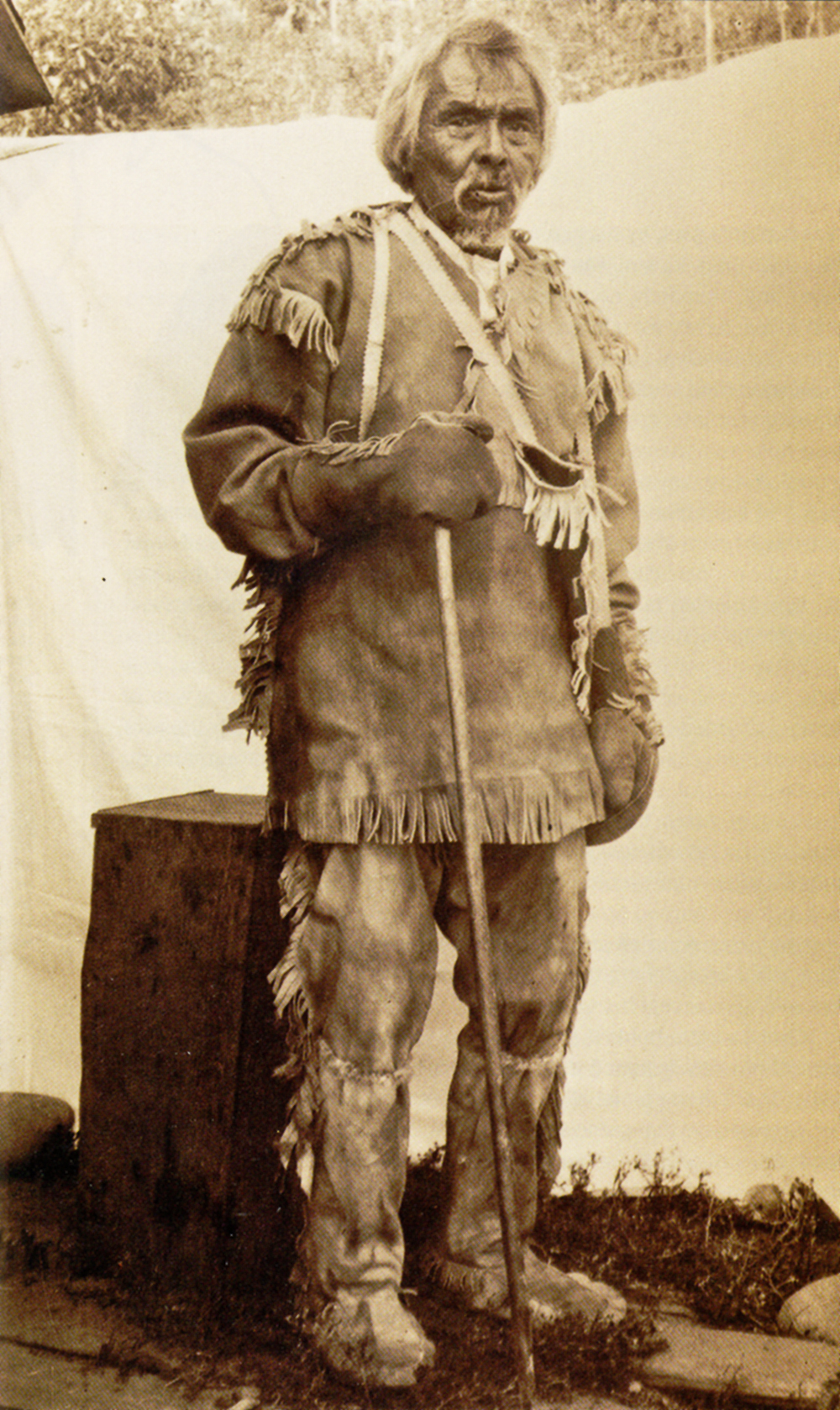
- James Teit, Tahltan medicine man, c. 1932

Regions with significant populations
- Canada (British Columbia)

Languages
- English, Tahltan

Religion
- Christianity, Animism

Related ethnic groups
- Kaska, Tagish

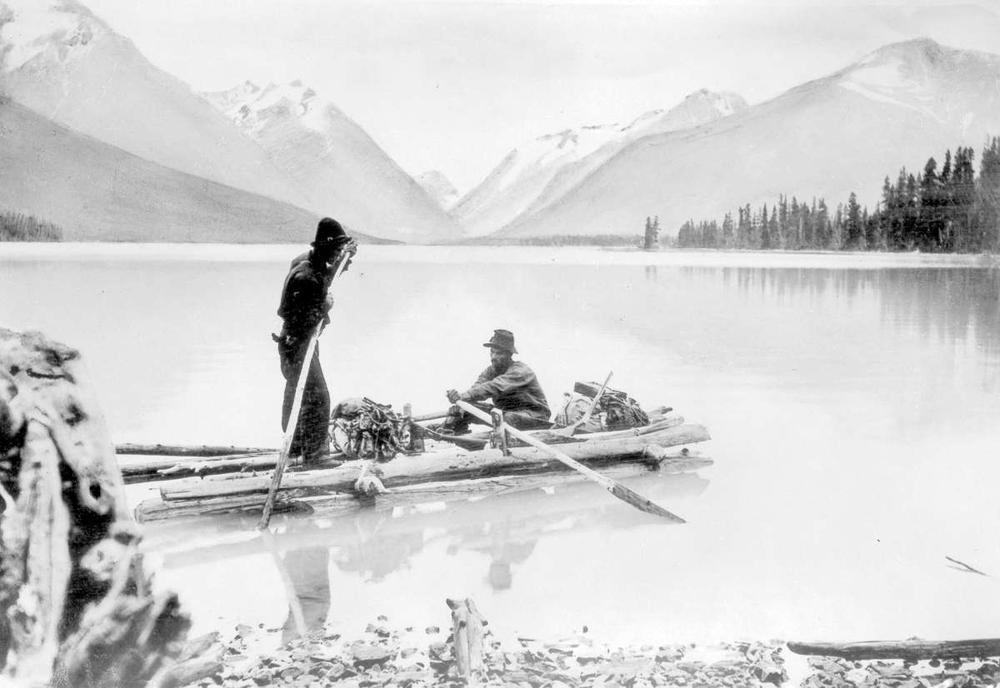
Tahltan men on boat to go hunt (early 20th century)

The Tahltan or Nahani are a First Nations people of the Athabaskan-speaking ethnolinguistic group who live in northern British Columbia, Canada, around Telegraph Creek, Dease Lake, and Iskut. The Tahltan constitute the fourth division of the Nahane (People of the West).

== Culture ==
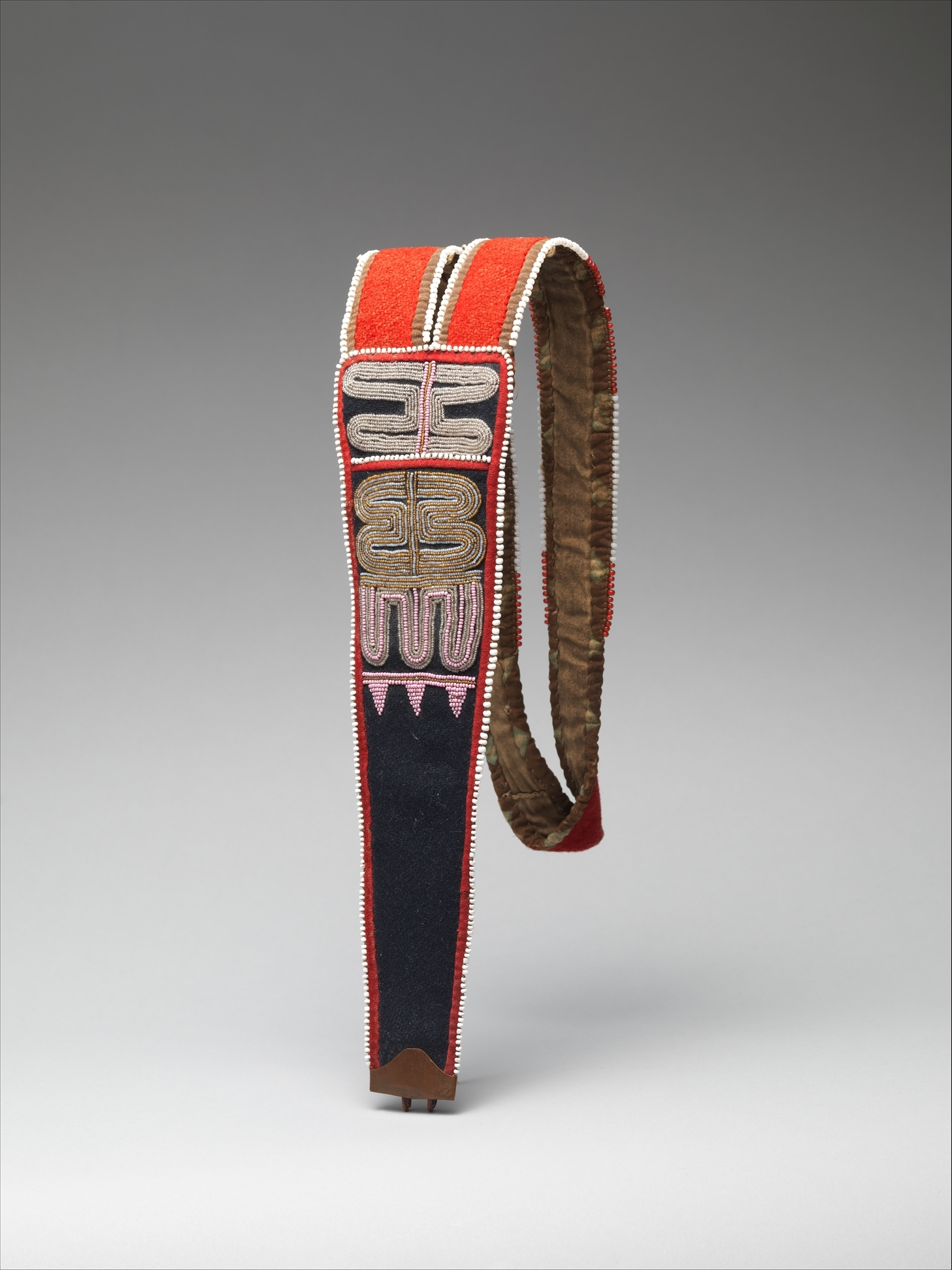
Unknown Tahltan artist, Beaded knife sheath, collection of the Metropolitan Museum of Art, gift of Ralph T. Coe.

The Tahltan cultural practices and lifeways varied widely as they were often widely separated and would have to endure varying conditions depending on their locality. In Tahltan culture it was believed that some of their ancestors had knowledge that others did not from times before a great flood. Some of these ancestors used that knowledge for the good of the people, while others used it for evil and to the disadvantage of others. Raven is considered to be the protagonist hero against these evil ancestors.

=== Social organization ===
Tahltan social organization is founded on matriarchy and intermarriage between two main clan designations. The two main clans of Tahltan people are Tses' Kiya (pronounced Tses-kee-ya) (Crow) and Chiyone (pronounced Chee-oanah) (Wolf). These two clans are further subdivided into four parties:

1. Kartchottee (Raven)—This family originated in the Interior toward the headwaters of the Taku River. This is the most numerous family of the tribe, also represented by the frog.
2. Nanyiee (Wolf)—Also represented by the brown bear, the killer-whale, and the shark. This family originated near the headwaters of Taku River, moved towards the ocean and settling among the Stikine Tlingit; and then ascended the Stikine River and became a family of the Tahltan.
3. Talarkoteen (Wolf)—Originating near Peace River in the Interior, these peoples followed Liard River to Dease Lake and then crossed to the Tuya.
4. Tuckclarwaydee (Wolf)—Also represented by the brown bear, the eagle, and the killer-whale. This family is credited as being the founders of the Tahltan tribe, originating in the interior near the headwaters of Nags river.

=== Government ===
Contemporary Tahltan society constitutes itself as the Tahltan Nation, which comprises the membership and governments of the Tahltan First Nation and Iskut First Nation.

== History ==
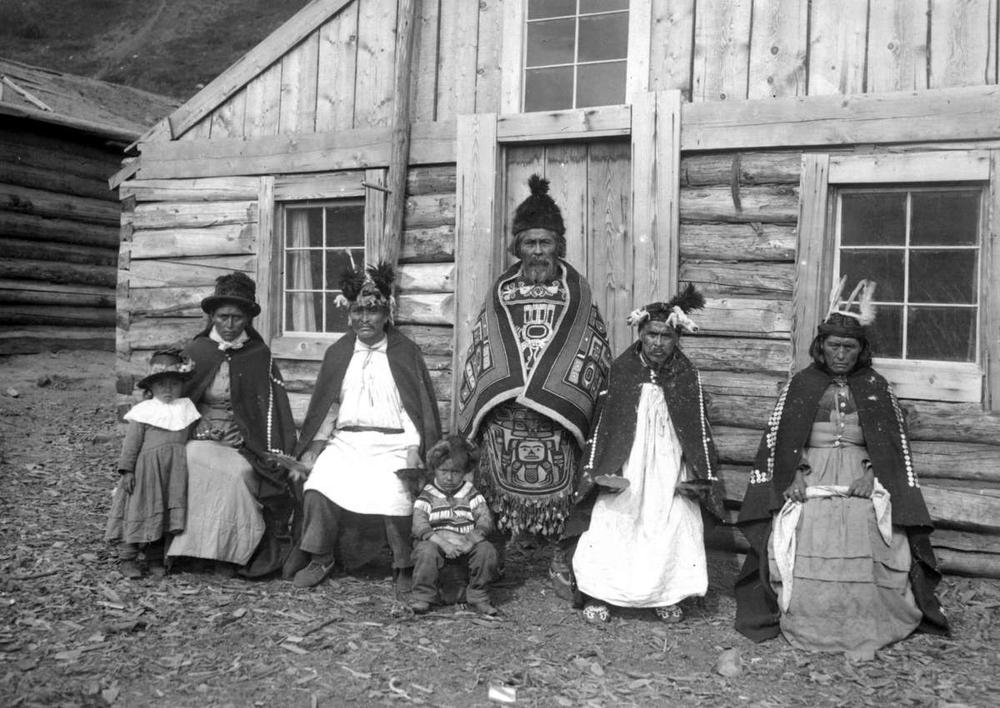
Tahltan dancers and shaman (early 20th century)

Ten thousand years ago, the Tahltan people used obsidian from Mount Edziza to make tools and weapons for trading material. This is the main source of obsidian found in northwestern British Columbia.

=== Coal-bed methane conflict ===
Coal-bed methane extraction had already been the subject of protests in the Bulkley Valley against a project planned near Telkwa, British Columbia. In a unanimous 2003 resolution, the Union of B.C. Municipalities asked for a moratorium on coal-bed methane mining in the province.

Since 2005, the Klabona Keepers, a group of Tahltan elders, have watched the road leading through Tahltan territory towards the Sacred headwaters (Klappan Valley) in opposition to development there, specifically a coalbed methane mining project planned by Royal Dutch Shell. The Sacred Headwaters (Klappan Valley) is home to the headwaters of the Nass, Skeena and Stikine Rivers. Not only do these rivers provide a home to important salmon stocks, Tahltan oral history holds that these headwaters are the place where the earth was first created and where Talhtan culture began.

In 2004, Shell was awarded the oil and gas rights to the Klappan Valley, one of British Columbia's largest coal deposits with an estimated 230 km^{3} (8 trillion cu ft) of methane. That year, Shell drilled three exploratory wells at the headwaters, but in 2005 four Shell employees who arrived at the band office in Iskut were turned away by a group of elders and no drilling occurred that summer. Non-violent blockades in 2005 and 2006 delayed development efforts and led to the arrests of 13 protesters. Talhtan territory was the site of half of all the mining exploration in British Columbia during 2006. Protests in Smithers have been as large as 600 people. David Suzuki and Wade Davis have both criticized plans for coal-bed methane mining in the headwaters and, in June 2007, 14 different environmental groups sent a joint letter to Shell opposing the project.

Representatives from Shell assert a determination to reach consensus in the community and note that the elected Tahltan Central Council (TCC) agreed to the exploration. Chief Jerry Asp was forced to resign in 2005 after protests from Tahltan members accusing him of a conflict of interest because of his involvement with two pro-development organizations.

On December 18, 2012, the B.C. government announced that Shell would be withdrawing its plans to explore and drill for coalbed methane gas in the Tahltan Territory. According to the Skeena Watershed Conservation Coalition, Shell has launched a lawsuit against Talhtan elders for loss of revenue. The Klabona Keepers have filed a counter-suit for failure to consult. Employment opportunities have come from natural resources development in recent years. Because of various concerns over the lands, the parties involved balance development and environmental aspects.

Talk of an Alaska-Canada railroad traversing Tahltan lands recurs every so often with feasibility studies being done.

== Language ==
Tahltan is a poorly documented Northern Athabaskan language. Some linguists consider Tahltan to be a language with three divergent but mutually intelligible dialects. Other linguists consider these to be separate languages. The number of speakers are below.

- Kaska: approximately 400 speakers (Poser 2003)
- Tahltan: approximately 35 speakers (Poser 2003)
- Tagish: no fluent speakers as of 2008

== See also ==
- Tahltan, British Columbia
- Tahltan Bear Dog
- Raven Tales#Tahltan

== Notes and references ==
=== References ===
- Hodge, Frederick Webb, Compiler. The Handbook of American Indians North of Mexico. Bureau of American Ethnology, Government Printing Office, 1906. As cited in Access Genealogy: Indian Tribal Records. Retrieved 4 December 2008.
- Emmons, George Thornton (1911). The Tahltan Indians. Philadelphia: The University Museum.
