= Barren vegetation =

Area of land where plant growth may be limited

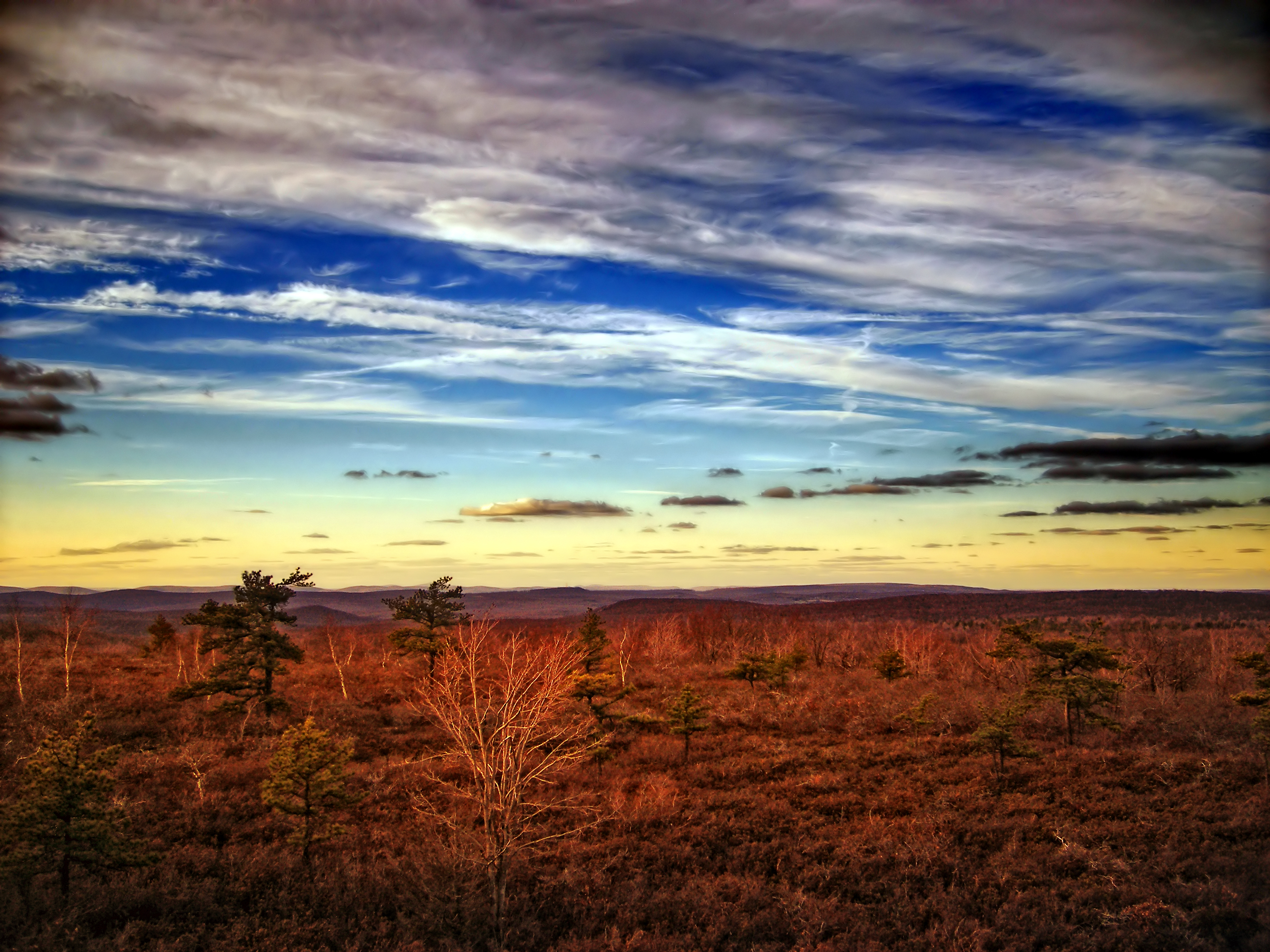
Barren vegetation in Luzerne County, Pennsylvania, U.S. April 2008.

Barren vegetation describes an area of land where plant growth may be sparse, stunted, and/or contain limited biodiversity. Environmental conditions such as toxic or infertile soil, high winds, coastal salt-spray, and climatic conditions are often key factors in poor plant growth and development. Barren vegetation can be categorized depending on the climate, geology, and geographic location of a specific area.

Pine barrens, coastal barrens, and serpentine barrens are some of the more distinct ecoregions for barren vegetation and are the most commonly researched by scientists. Often referred to as "heathlands", barrens can be excellent environments for unique biological diversity and taxonomic compositions.

== Serpentine Barrens ==
=== Biological diversity ===
Serpentine barren habitats include grasslands, chaparral, and woodlands as well as some areas that are very sparsely vegetated. Areas of sparse vegetation are often characterized by annual and perennial herbaceous plant species. The flora of the serpentines is recognized globally for its high level of biological diversity which includes over 1600 taxa of plants occurring in serpentine areas of the eastern U.S., with as many as 2000 taxa considered to be endemic to serpentine rich soils.

=== Geology ===
Serpentine barrens are distinct due to the serpentine-rich soil produced by the hydration weathering and metamorphic transformation of ultramafic igneous bedrock. Serpentine barrens are often characterized as high-stress environments with low water and nutrient availability. These areas are often depleted in basic nutrients such as nitrogen and phosphorus. The soil is often shallow and can be toxic due to high heavy metal concentrations such as nickel, cobalt and chromium. As a result of the harsh conditions and unique edaphic properties presented by serpentine barrens these environments support stress-tolerant plant communities characterized by distinct and locally defined plant species.

== Pine barrens ==
The Pine Barrens comprise 550,000 hectares of a heavily forested area of coastal plain and are home to at least 850 species of plant life, including many which are endangered or threatened.

The Pine Barrens are primarily formed on unconsolidated, acidic, medium-to-coarse grained sands and gravel. The mature soils are considered to be true podzols and are siliceous and highly permeable. The low moisture holding capacity and nutrient status of the soil create low vegetation growth rates throughout much of the Pine Barrens.

== Coastal barrens ==
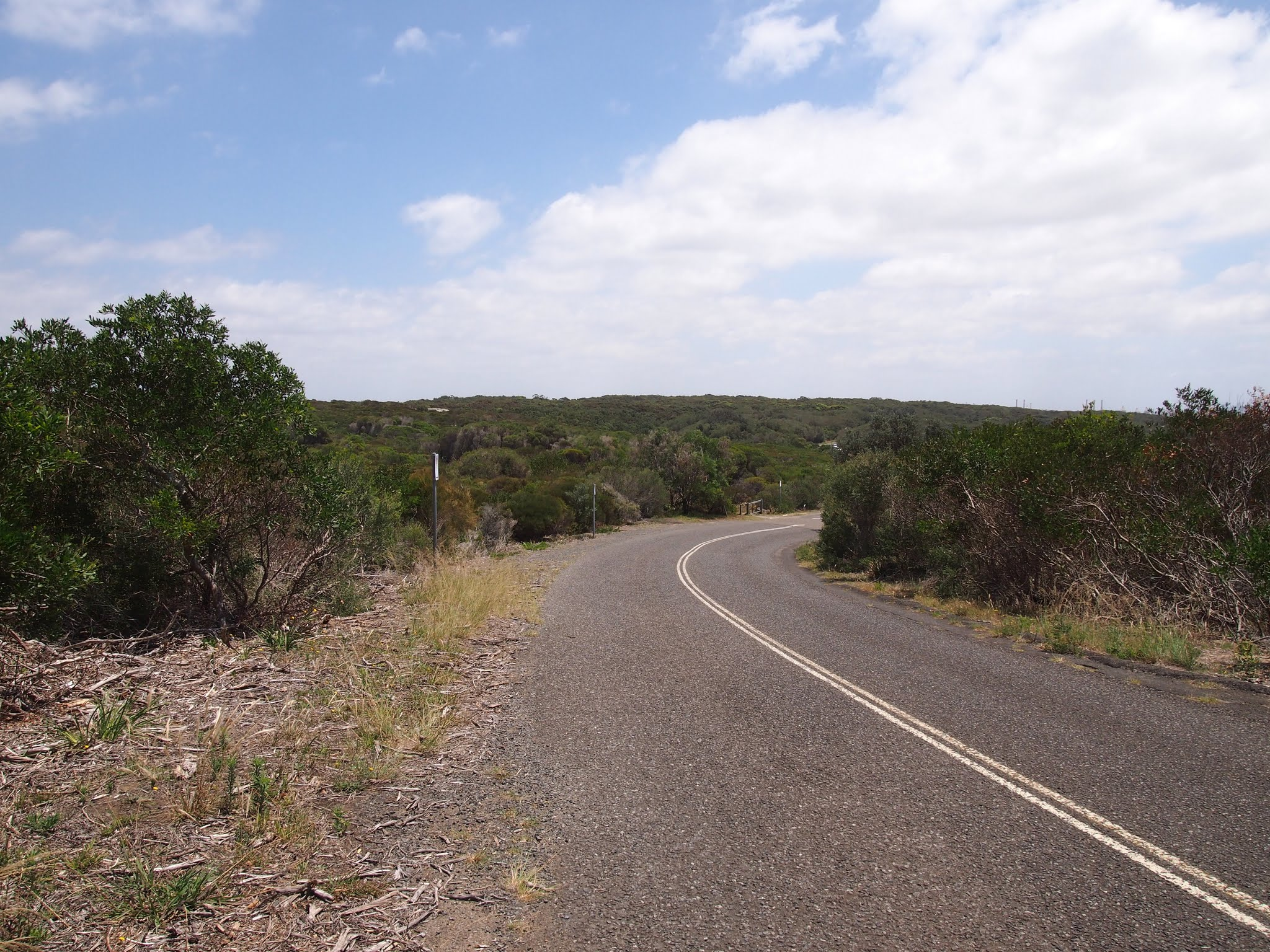
A heathland in Botany Bay National Park, Sydney, Australia

Coastal Barrens are characterized by short vegetation, sparse tree cover, exposed bedrock, and bog pockets. Often, coastal barrens exhibit stressful climatic conditions and are subject to consistently windy conditions and salt-spray.

Coastal Barrens typically host low growing shrub communities with sparse tree cover and are often dominated by ericaceous species such as the black huckleberry (Gaylussacia baccata) and low bush blueberry (Vaccinium angustifolium). The coastal barrens of Atlantic Canada host a variety of taxonomic species such as macro lichens, mosses, and vascular plants. Studies have recorded 173 different species in various coastal barren regions of the province of Nova Scotia. This number included 105 vascular plants, 41 macro lichens, and 27 moss species with six provincially rare vascular species that were found predominantly in nearshore areas that contained high levels of substrate salt and nutrients, variable substrate depth, and short vegetation.

In Sydney, Australia, the coastal area is mostly dominated by mallee or stunted forms of eucalyptus trees, and scrubby vegetation such as Allocasuarina distyla, Angophora hispida, Banksia ericifolia and Grevillea oleoides, among other species, typically in an exposed coastal sandstone plateau with infertile, shallow, fairly damp soils. Unique to New South Wales, such vegetation is found from Gosford to Royal National Park, with southern outliers at Barren Grounds and Jervis Bay.

== Climate zones ==
Although barren lands are generally located in areas associated with arid, semi-arid, polar and tundra climates, they can also be extensively found in milder, temperate, and/or humid climates as well, such as:

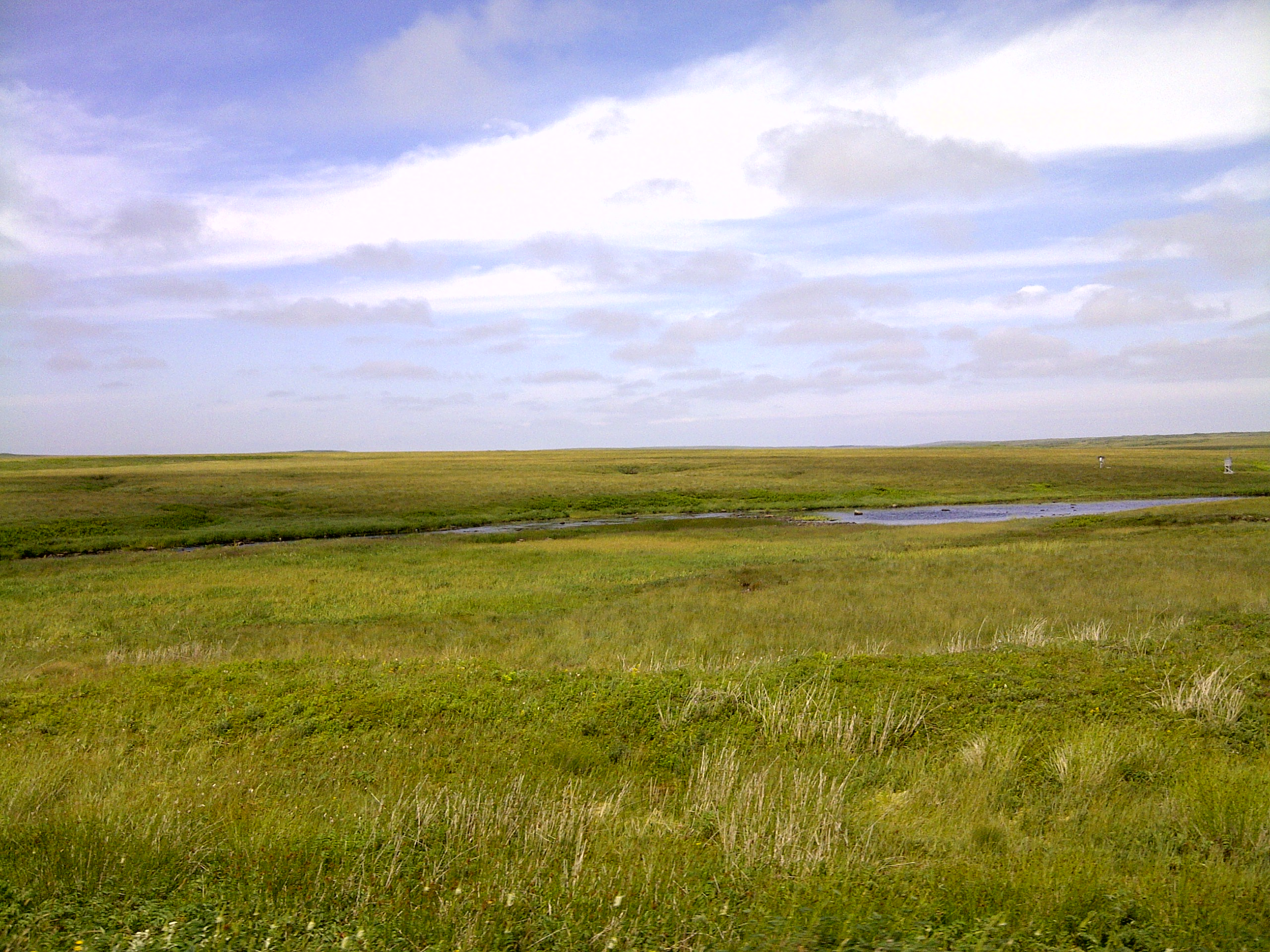
Avalon Peninsula, Newfoundland, Canada, August 2012

- The Buck Creek Serpentine Barrens in North Carolina received around 1770 mm of precipitation in the last ten years.
- The Nottingham Serpentine Barren are very humid and has an average temperature of 11 degrees Celsius. Here, the average precipitation averages at 1200 mm and is spread out evenly throughout the year.
- Another region of barren vegetation is located in the Appalachian Mountains. In the low elevation of the northern part of this mountain chain, the annual precipitation is a little lower than on the southern Appalachians high peaks. In this location, precipitation falls mostly as rain rather than snow; and also precipitation occurs mostly in the summer
- The ecoregion known as the Pine Barrens are found to spread across much of the northeastern United States, primarily in the state of New Jersey.
- Along the Atlantic coast of Nova Scotia and northeastern United States, there are patches of unforested coastal barrens spread throughout areas that contain exposed bedrock and/or little soil cover within a forested landscape. More extensive barrens can be found in much of Newfoundland and Labrador and further north in mainland Canada.
- In 1819, during the early European colonization of Australia, Sydney's landform was described by English explorer William Wentworth as "extremely barren, being a poor hungry sand, thickly studded with rocks". Moreover, Adelaide Plains, a region with a Mediterranean climate, was described as "barren" by early settlers.
- Calcareous glades are sometimes described as barrens. They occur on dolomite and limestone in humid climates.

== Anthropogenic relationships ==
Anthropogenic interactions have been used over the years to help change and drive vegetation in the eastern US. Meaning that the actions of human-beings will play a role in what type of vegetation will grow in some locations. This is including things like fires and fire suppression, grazing, logging, and agriculture clearing. Research has been done and anecdotal evidence has been shown to suggest vegetation structures and composition in the eastern serpentine barrens may have also been influenced by local disturbance regimes associated with these events as well as mining

Savannahs and barrens are ecosystems that are rare in North America. This is due in part to human impacts, such as agriculture, urbanization, and altering the natural fire regimes. Over the past 50 years, the area of savannah-like openings and pine woodland has been continuously reduced over the years, a tendency opposite to that of hardwood forests. These changes in vegetation structures along with the composition are caused by, in part to anthropogenic changes in the fire regime. Following the burning of vegetation there is a release of inorganic nutrients into the ecosystem caused by the combustion of the plants biomass and therefore, releasing the nutrients. This release of nutrients, after the occurrence, is thought to be a reason for an increase in plant productivity.

== Global distribution and geography ==
Regions on the Earth’s surface where soils are dominating the ecosystems with little to no plant cover are often referred to as “Barren”. These places are areas like deserts, Polar Regions, areas of high elevation, and zones of glacier retreat. For barren zones that are situated in mountain ranges, they are often called the "Subnival Zone", and are found at elevations between the upper limit of the vegetation zone and the lower limit of the ice-covered zone. Subnival zones in places like the Rockies, Andes, and Himalayas have increased greatly in the past few years due to the retreat of high elevation glaciers and the ice caps.

One area for study is The Nottingham Serpentine Barrens, which covers 200 ha in southern Chester Country, Pennsylvania on the Pennsylvania-Maryland border. The typical serpentine barren is either a prairie or savannah grassland. The soils here in this location are a section of the Neshaminy-Chrome-Conowingo association. These soils are deep and are derived from the serpentine bedrock. This series of soils are well-drained and also moderately sloping. With this, these specific locations have been under heavy erosion forces and have a depth to its parent bedrock within a distance of 15–75 cm. Here, there is also low permeability which makes it difficult for plants to have availability to water and therefore hard to collect moisture.

Mean elevation and elevation range limits both vegetation zones and individual species should be defined with increasing latitude. For example, in the southern Appalachians, high-elevation outcrops, composition gradients are a function of elevation, potential solar radiation, a geographic gradient that corresponds to broad geological differences (mafic rocks to the northwest vs. felsic rocks in the southwest direction), and surficial geomorphology (bedrock surfaces that are less fractured in the southeast).

== See also ==
- Alvar
- Sclerophyll
