= Telegraph Creek =

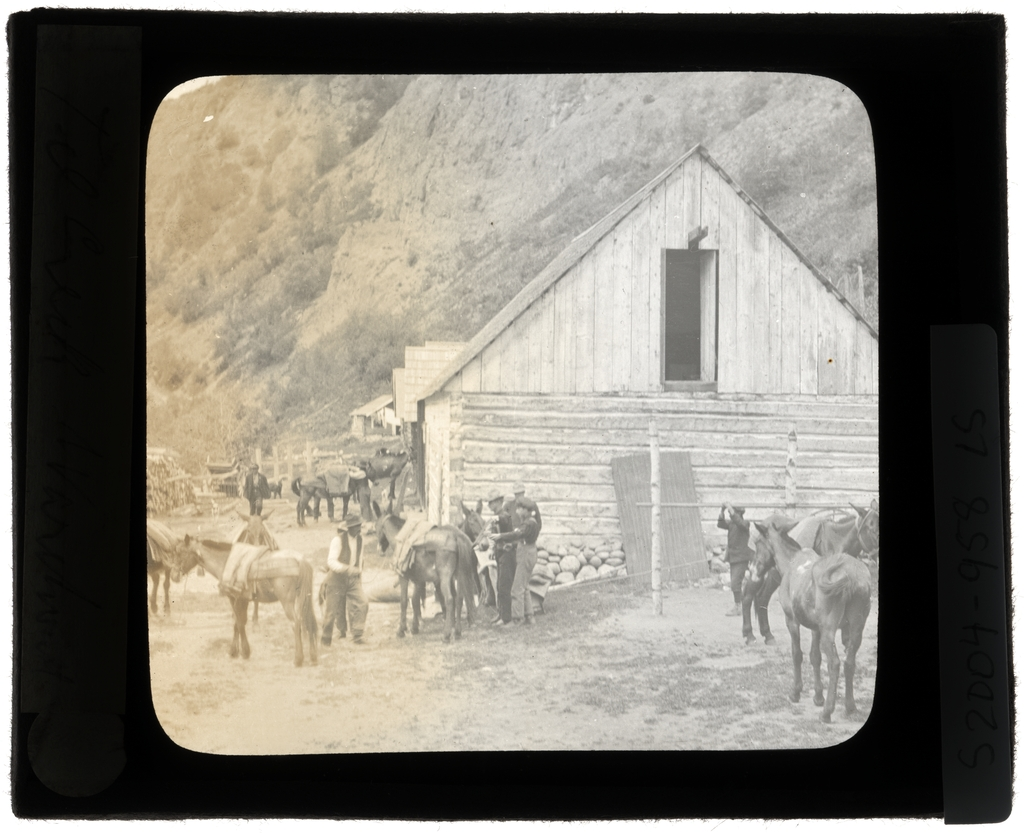

- Location within British Columbia
- Coordinates: 57°54′N 131°10′W
- Country: Canada
- Province: British Columbia
- Regional district: Kitimat–Stikine

Area
  - Total: 1.46 km^{2} (0.56 sq mi)

Population (2016)
  - Total: 53
  - Density: 36/km^{2} (94/sq mi)
- Time zone: UTC−07:00 (PT)

Telegraph Creek is a small community located off Highway 37 in northern British Columbia at the confluence of the Stikine River and Telegraph Creek. The only permanent settlement on the Stikine River, it is home to approximately 250 members of Tahltan First Nation and non-native residents. The town offers basic services, including Anglican and Catholic churches, a general store, a post office, a clinic with several nurses on-call around the clock, two Royal Canadian Mounted Police officers, and a K-9 school. Steep river banks and rocky gorges form the terraced nature of the geography.

The community includes Telegraph Creek Indian Reserve No. 6, Telegraph Creek Indian Reserve No. 6A, and Guhthe Tah Indian Reserve No. 12 which are under the governance of the Tahltan First Nation of Telegraph Creek. Stikine Indian Reserve No. 7, which is one mile west (downstream) and on the opposite side of the Stikine River, is under the governance of the Iskut First Nation of the settlement of Iskut, which is on the river of the same name. The two bands together comprise the Tahltan Nation.

Tahltan (or Nahanni) refers to a Northern Athabaskan people that live around Telegraph Creek, Dease Lake and Iskut.

== History ==
The Stikine region is the traditional home of the Tahltan people, who have lived there for generations. The modern history of the Telegraph Creek and Dease Lake area dates back to the 1860s and 1870s with the Stikine and Cassiar Gold Rushes. Telegraph Creek witnessed the discovery of gold by prospectors on the Stikine River in the 1860s and was the head of navigation. In 1866, the construction of the Russian-American Telegraph line to the Yukon gave Telegraph Creek its name.

As early as 10,000 years ago, the Tahltan people used obsidian from the Mount Edziza volcanic complex to make tools and weapons for trading material. This is the main source of obsidian found in northwestern British Columbia.

In 1874, Nellie Cashman, nicknamed "the Angel of Cassiar", opened a boarding house for miners in Telegraph Creek during the Cassiar gold rush.

Author Edward Hoagland wrote extensively about Telegraph Creek in his 1969 book Notes from the Century Before: A Journal from British Columbia in which he reveals the presence of a high level of ghost activities.

== Recreation ==
Telegraph and its surrounding areas are known for their hiking, riverboating, camping, hunting and fishing. There are organized tours lasting from half a day to several days.

The area surrounding Telegraph Creek holds five British Columbia Provincial parks:

- Stikine River Provincial Park and Mount Edziza Provincial Park (both located near Telegraph Creek)
- Great Glacier Provincial Park (100 km (62 mi) to the southwest)
- Choquette Hot Springs Provincial Park (southwest of Telegraph Creek)
- Border Lake Provincial Park (180 km (110 mi) to the south)

== Access ==
The road between Dease Lake, BC and Telegraph Creek is beautiful but rough, with 113 km (70 mi) of gravel, steep gradients (up to 20%), narrow passages along canyon walls with no guardrails, and sharp-angled switchbacks. Only the first 4.7 km (2.9 mi) stretch is paved.

Telegraph Creek Road (also called Hwy. 51) should be driven with caution and awareness; it is suitable for most vehicles but is not recommended for large RVs and travel trailers. One source indicates that "the road is prone to washouts and rock slides". At times when the road is closed, the government of BC provides warnings on its www.DriveBC.ca Web site.

The community can also be reached by water, via the Stikine River from Alaska and by air.

== Notable people from Telegraph Creek ==
- Dempsey Bob, carver
- Dale Campbell, carver

== See also ==
- Telegraph Creek Airport
- Telegraph Creek Water Aerodrome
- Iskut, British Columbia
- Glenora, British Columbia
