= Mount White-Fraser =

Mountain in British Columbia, Canada

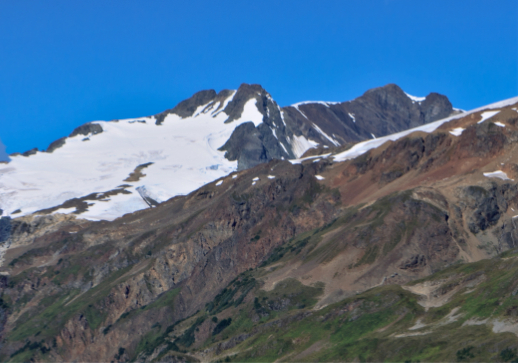
- Mount White-Fraser, east aspect

Highest point
- Elevation: 2,331 m (7,648 ft)
- Prominence: 526 m (1,726 ft)
- Listing: Mountains of British Columbia
- Coordinates: 56°11′00″N 130°12′30″W

Geography
- Location within British Columbia Location within Canada
- Interactive map of Mount White-Fraser
- Location: British Columbia, Canada
- District: Cassiar Land District
- Parent range: Boundary Ranges; Coast Mountains
- Topo map: NTS 104B1 LeDuc Glacier

Mount White-Fraser is a 2,331 metres (7,648 ft) glaciated mountain located in the Boundary Ranges of British Columbia, Canada. It is situated 31 kilometres (19 mi) north-northwest of Stewart, and 10 km (6 mi) northwest of Mount Bayard. Precipitation runoff from the peak and meltwater from the surrounding Salmon Glacier drains into the Salmon River. The mountain was named by the International Boundary Survey for one of its own members, George White-Fraser (1872-1920), who also served with the Canadian Infantry in France during World War I. The mountain's name was officially adopted March 31, 1924. Weather permitting, the mountain can be seen from the gravel Granduc Mine Road near Hyder, Alaska, which is seasonally open in summer.

== Climate ==
Based on the Köppen climate classification, Mount White-Fraser is located in the marine west coast climate zone of western North America. Most weather fronts originate in the Pacific Ocean, and travel east toward the Coast Mountains where they are forced upward by the range (Orographic lift), causing them to drop their moisture in the form of rain or snowfall. As a result, the Coast Mountains experience high precipitation, especially during the winter months in the form of snowfall. Temperatures can drop below −20 °C with wind chill factors below −30 °C.

== Gallery ==
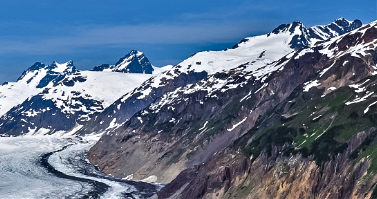
Mount White-Fraser in upper right

== See also ==
- Geography of British Columbia
