= Mount Bayard =

Mountain in Canada and the United States

- Boundary Peak 15
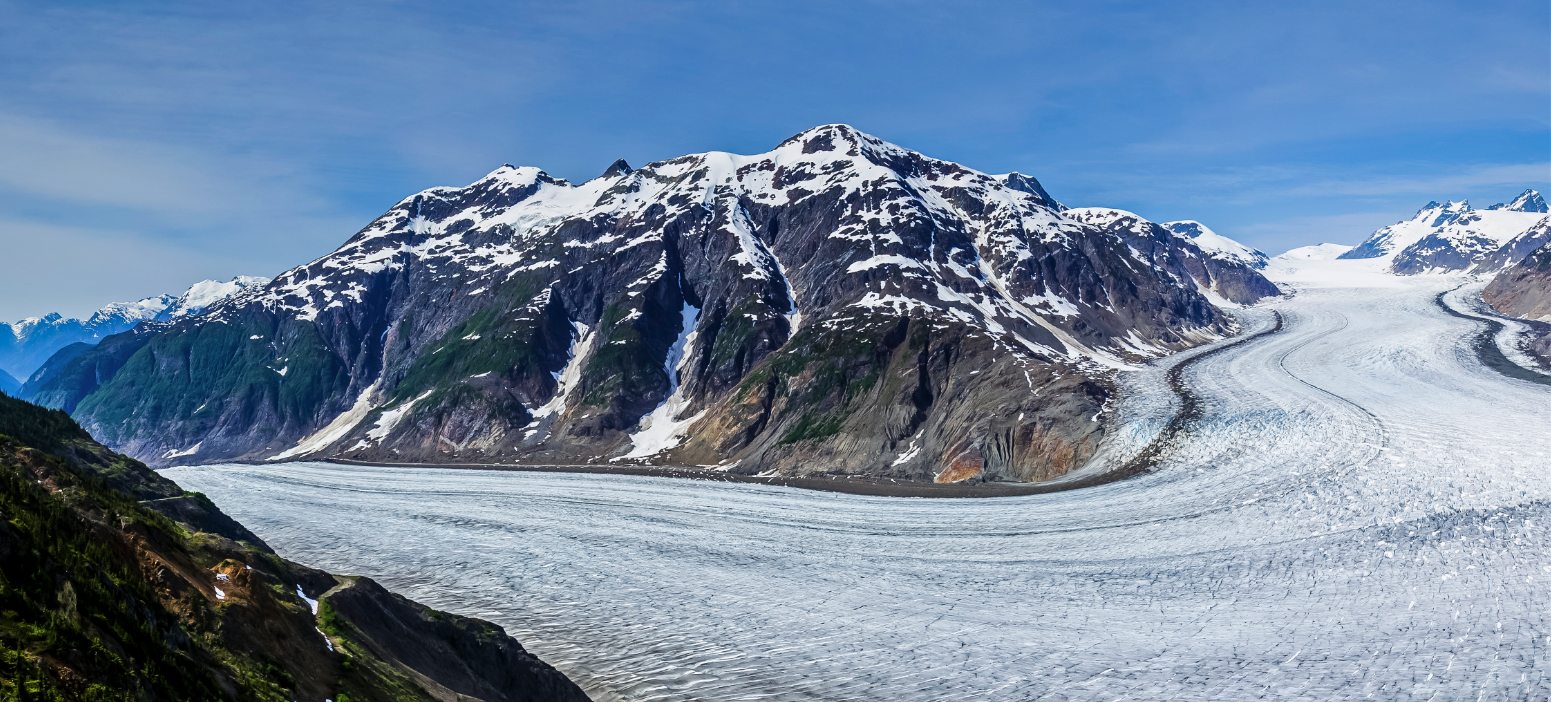
- Mount Bayard and Salmon Glacier

Highest point
- Elevation: 1,999 m (6,558 ft)
- Prominence: 189 m (620 ft)
- Parent peak: Mount Lindeborg (2109 m)
- Listing: Mountains of British Columbia Mountains of Alaska
- Coordinates: 56°07′22″N 130°06′13″W

Geography
- Location within British Columbia Location within Alaska
- Interactive map of Mount Bayard
- Location: British Columbia, Canada
- Parent range: Boundary Ranges; Coast Mountains
- Topo map: NTS 104B1 LeDuc Glacier

Mount Bayard is a 1,999-metre (6,558 ft) glaciated mountain located in the Boundary Ranges on the international boundary line of Alaska and British Columbia. It is situated 22 kilometres (14 mi) north-northwest of Stewart, 10 km (6 mi) southeast of Mount White-Fraser, and 3.4 km (2 mi) east of Mount Lindeborg, which is its nearest higher peak. Precipitation runoff from the peak and meltwater from the Boundary and Salmon Glaciers that surround the peak drains into the Salmon River. Weather permitting, the mountain can be seen from the gravel Granduc Mine Road at Hyder, Alaska.

== History ==
Mount Lindeborg was the name adopted for this feature in 1921, however by 1924 it was renamed Mount Bayard in lieu of Lindeborg. The Mount Lindeborg name was transferred to the peak 3.4 km (2 mi) immediately west. Mount Bayard was named by the International Boundary Commission for Thomas F. Bayard (1828–1898), a diplomat and United States Senator. The mountain's toponym was officially adopted July 31, 1927, by the Geographical Names Board of Canada. The mountain is also known as Boundary Peak 15.

== Climate ==
Based on the Köppen climate classification, Mount Bayard is located in the marine west coast climate zone of western North America. Most weather fronts originate in the Pacific Ocean, and travel east toward the Coast Mountains where they are forced upward by the range (Orographic lift), causing them to drop their moisture in the form of rain or snowfall. As a result, the Coast Mountains experience high precipitation, especially during the winter months in the form of snowfall. Temperatures can drop below −20 °C with wind chill factors below −30 °C.

== Gallery ==
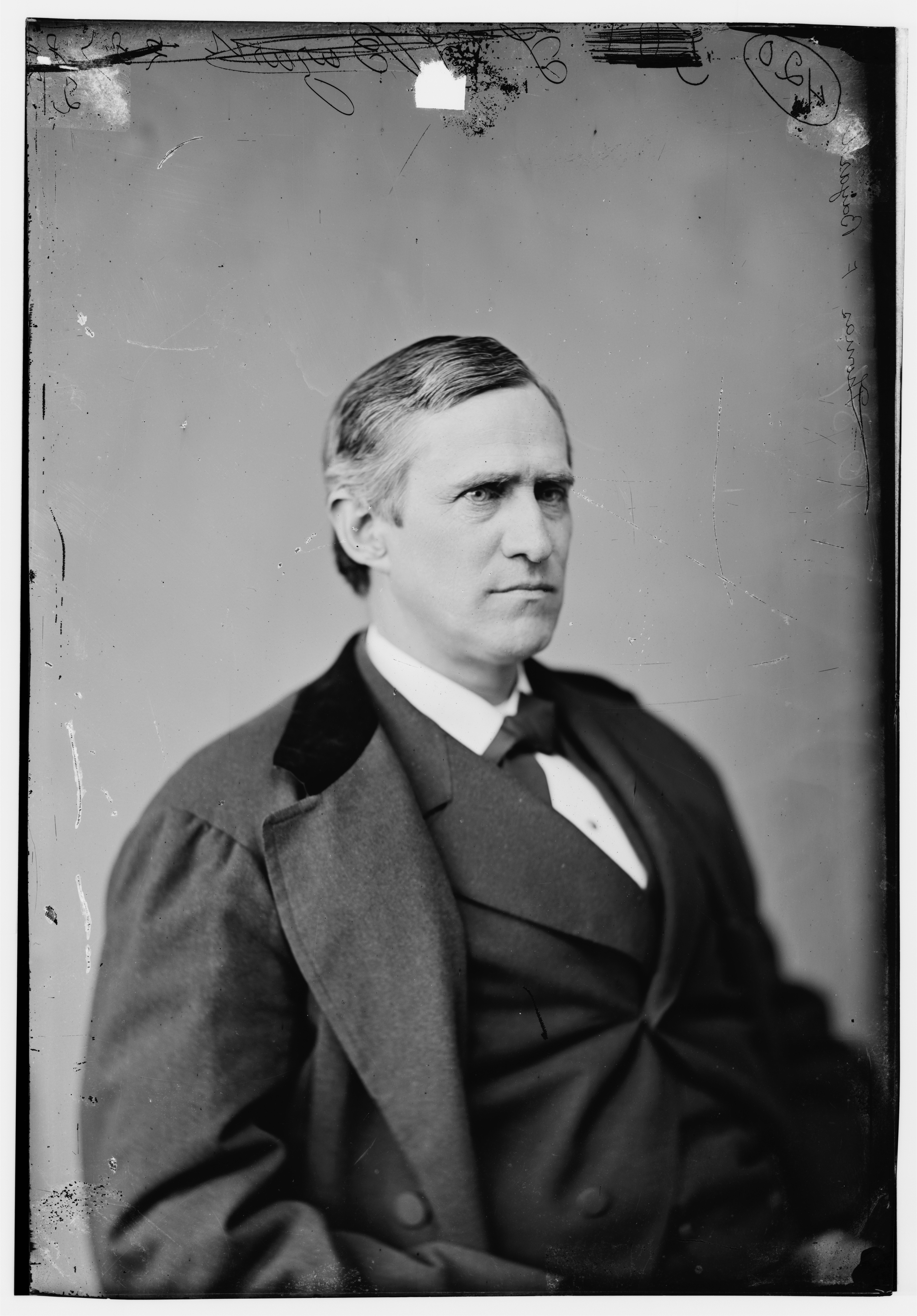
Thomas F. Bayard

== See also ==
- List of Boundary Peaks of the Alaska–British Columbia/Yukon border
- Geography of British Columbia
- Geography of Alaska
