= British Columbia Highway 37A =

Highway in British Columbia

Highway 37A
- Stewart Highway; Glacier Highway

Route information
- Maintained by the Ministry of Transportation and Infrastructure
- Length: 65 km (40 mi)
- Existed: 1984–present

Major junctions
- East end: Highway 37 at Meziadin Junction
- West end: U.S. border to Hyder, AK near Stewart

Location
- Country: Canada
- Province: British Columbia

Highway system
- British Columbia provincial highways
← Highway 37	→ Highway 39

British Columbia Highway 37A, which is known as the Stewart Highway and also as the Glacier Highway, is a 65 km (40 mi) long spur of Highway 37 west from Meziadin Junction to the border towns of Stewart and Hyder, Alaska, where it connects with Alaska's Salmon River Road. It was first built in the early 1960s to facilitate the movement of asbestos from the town of Cassiar. The Highway 37A designation was assigned in 1984.

The Salmon River Road continues from the border as an unsigned highway in Alaska, and heads north-westerly through Hyder and the Tongass National Forest. It crosses the border again at the abandoned town site of Premier, British Columbia, where it continues on as Granduc Road to the Salmon Glacier summit viewpoint ending at the Granduc Mine.

The road is extremely vulnerable to avalanches through Bear Pass. As such, the Ministry of Transportation and Infrastructure runs an anti-avalanche program through the pass.

== Major intersections ==
The entire route is in Kitimat-Stikine Regional District.

Location	km	mi	Destinations	Notes
Stewart	0.00	0.00	International Street – Hyder	Continuation into Alaska
Stewart	0.00	0.00	Canada – United States border at Hyder-Stewart border crossing	
Meziadin Junction	65.11	40.46	Highway 37 (Stewart–Cassiar Highway) – Terrace, Prince George	Eastern terminus; road continues as Highway 37
1.000 mi = 1.609 km; 1.000 km = 0.621 mi
