= Bell II, British Columbia =

Bell II
- Locality
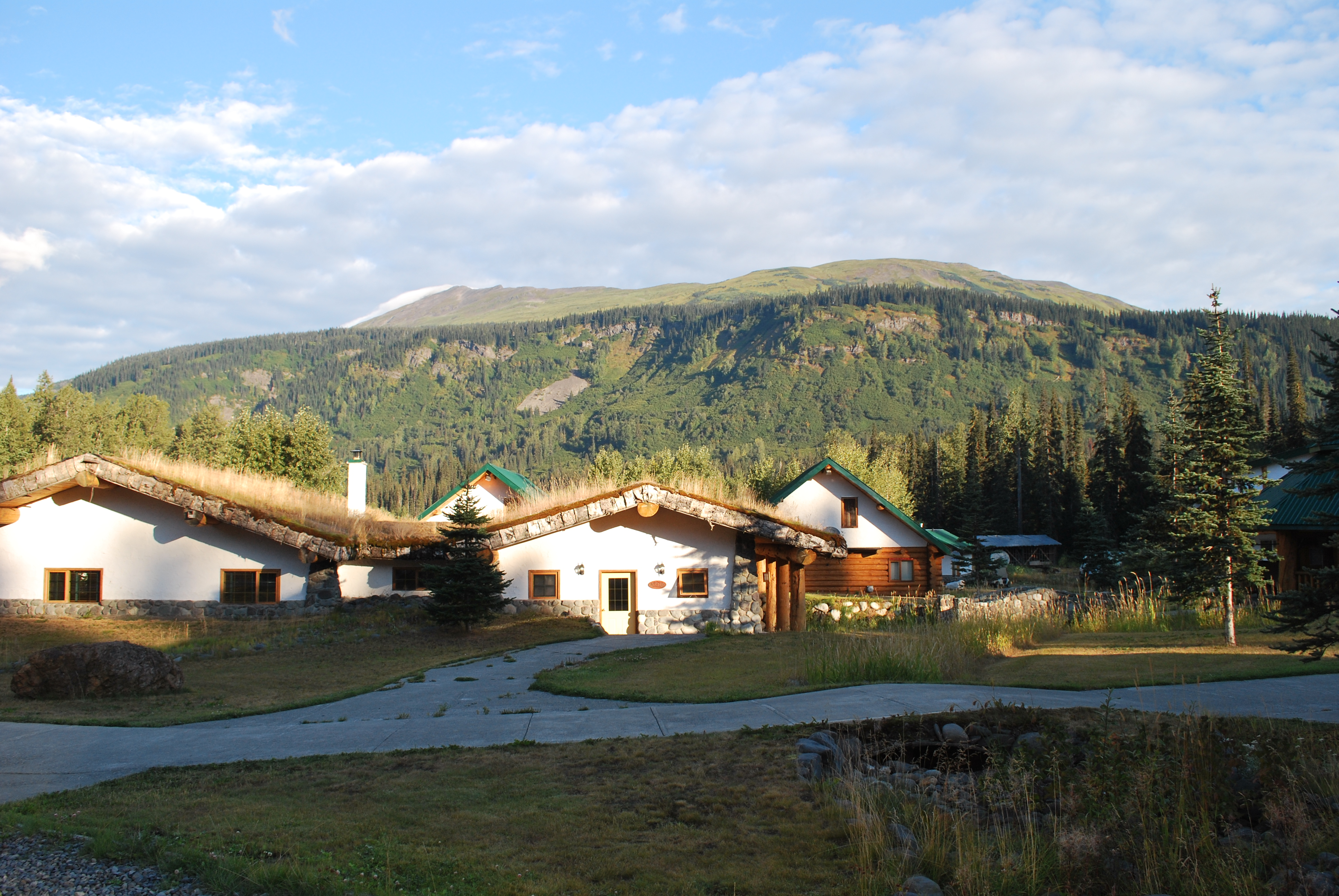
- Bell 2 Lodge

- Location of Bell II in British Columbia
- Coordinates: 56°44′39″N 129°47′46″W
- Country: Canada
- Province: British Columbia
- Regional district: Kitimat–Stikine
- Land district: Cassiar Land District
- Elevation: 580 m (1,900 ft)
- Time zone: UTC−07:00 (Pacific Time)
- Area code: 250 / 778 / 236
- Highways: Highway 37

Bell II (/bɛl tu/) is an unincorporated locality in the Skeena Mountains of northwestern British Columbia, Canada. It lies on the Stewart–Cassiar Highway (Highway 37) at the highway's second crossing of the Bell-Irving River, from which it takes its name, about 249 kilometres (155 mi) north of Kitwanga and 241 kilometres (150 mi) south of Dease Lake. The locality is centred on Bell 2 Lodge, a year-round highway service stop and resort that provides fuel, food and lodging to travellers and is the principal winter base of Last Frontier Heliskiing.

== History ==
The Bell-Irving River area lies within overlapping territories asserted by several Indigenous nations. Environmental assessment studies for the nearby KSM mining project identified the area around the highway as falling within territories asserted by the Tahltan Nation and the Skii km Lax Ha, and recorded that Skii km Lax Ha members hunt around Bell II and along the Bell-Irving River and trap along the Highway 37 corridor. The same studies documented traditional travel and resource use in the wider region by the Tahltan, Gitxsan, Gitanyow and Skii km Lax Ha.

Long before a road existed, Ningunsaw Pass connected the Bell II area with Bob Quinn Lake to the north and was used by surveyors and other travellers. The Yukon Telegraph Trail also passed through the area, and remnants of its wire survive close to the highway near Bell II. The Stewart–Cassiar Highway was completed in 1972. When the first business opened at the site, the highway was still a gravel road for its entire length from Kitwanga to the Yukon border.

Bell II began in 1979 when Ernie Kreese (Note: The lodge's published history spells the founder's surname "Kreese". A 2011 Terrace Standard article, drawing on a local historian who worked at Bell II around 1980 while he was building it, spells it "Kriese".) built Bell 2 Crossing as a basic gas station and garage for travellers heading to the Yukon and Alaska, just south of the second crossing of the Bell-Irving River, with a small restaurant and cabins later added to the facility. Ownership passed in the mid-1980s to Pete and Kathy Kossey. In 1990, Bell II (not Bell 2 or Bell Two) was adopted as an official place due to it being a well-established local name. The BC Geographical Names Office recorded its population at that time as about 20 in winter and 50 in summer.

In 1996, the founding partners of Last Frontier Heliskiing, George Rosset, Franz Fux, Mike Watling and Geoff Straight explored the Skeena Mountains surrounding Bell II to evaluate the potential for a new heliskiing destination. Their interest had been prompted by mountain guide Herb Bleuer's accounts of the area's skiing. The same year, the company ran an exploratory eight-week heliskiing season from the lodge using a single helicopter. In 1998, they purchased the property, renamed it Bell 2 Lodge and between 1998 and 2003 completely rebuilt and expanded the facility, with additional upgrades in 2013. (Note: Last Frontier's own published accounts vary slightly from these dates, giving 1978 for the original construction, 1997 for the purchase, and 1997 to 2003 for the reconstruction.) In 2014, Rosset and Fux sold their stakes in Last Frontier Heliskiing and Bell 2 Lodge, and Watling succeeded Rosset as managing partner of both.

On April 11, 2023, an avalanche near Bell 2 Lodge caught five people on a Last Frontier heliskiing tour, killing one and injuring three. The BC Coroners Service investigated the death.

== Geography ==
Bell II is in the valley of the Bell-Irving River, a tributary of the Nass River, between the Skeena Mountains and the Coast Mountains. The BC Geographical Names Office places the locality on the south side of the river, in the Cassiar Land District. The lodge sits at an elevation of about 1,900 feet (580 m). It is about 360 kilometres (220 mi) by road north of Smithers.

== Biogeography ==
Bell II lies in the Interior Cedar-Hemlock zone, very wet cold subzone or ICHvc. The area's dominant tree is Subalpine Fir. White Spruce is common. Hemlock is inconspicuous on the alluvial land around the lodge, but is common in upland forests nearby. Cedar is not native to the area. The most prominent deciduous tree is Black Cottonwood. Shrubs include Thimbleberry, Goatsbeard, and Devil's Club. Large animals such as moose, black bear, grizzly bear and wolf are common.

== Economy ==
Bell 2 Lodge operates year-round. It has log chalet accommodation, a restaurant, a coffee shop, a campground, a gas station selling gasoline, diesel and propane, and a helipad with aircraft refuelling. It is the only fuel stop on Highway 37 between Meziadin Junction and Tatogga Lake. In summer its customers include passing tourists, mining industry clients and contractors. The property is not connected to the electrical grid and has no cellular service. As of 2016, the lodge generated all of its own electricity, ran its own water filtration and sewage systems, and relied on satellite links for communications. Construction materials, supplies and staff are brought in from centres such as Smithers and Terrace.

In winter, the lodge is the larger of Last Frontier Heliskiing's two bases; the other is the Ripley Creek Inn in Stewart. Bell 2 Lodge accommodates up to 36 heliskiing guests a week, and helicopters depart from pads at the lodge. Last Frontier describes its tenure, which it gives as more than 10,100 square kilometres (3,900 sq mi), as the largest single heliskiing area in the world.

In summer and autumn, the lodge serves highway travellers and other visitors. Fly-fishing outfitters use it as a base for guided steelhead fishing on the upper Bell-Irving River.

== Transportation ==
The Stewart–Cassiar Highway is one of two highway routes connecting British Columbia with the Yukon and Alaska. Bell 2 Lodge is at about kilometre 249 of the highway, measured from its junction with Highway 16 near Kitwanga. The bridge carrying the highway across the Bell-Irving River is at kilometre 249.3, a few hundred metres north of the lodge, and has an open steel-grate deck. The highway's first crossing of the river, Bell Irving River Bridge No. 1, is about 30 kilometres (19 mi) north of Meziadin Junction. Built in 1967, the 111-metre (364 ft) bridge was rehabilitated under a $7.85 million contract awarded in 2022.

North of Bell II, the highway crosses Ningunsaw Pass, which connects the Bell II area with Bob Quinn Lake. The provincial Ministry of Transportation and Infrastructure installed an automated avalanche detection system at the pass in 2021, the second in the province, using radar and high-definition cameras to monitor avalanche activity. The ministry periodically closes the highway between the Bell II bridge and Bob Quinn for avalanche control.

== Resource development ==
BC Hydro's Northwest Transmission Line, a 344-kilometre (214 mi), 287-kilovolt line running north from the Skeena Substation near Terrace to a substation near Bob Quinn Lake, was energized in 2014. The line follows Highway 37 through the Bell-Irving valley and over Ningunsaw Pass.

Two mine access roads leave the highway south of Bell II. The access road to the Brucejack gold mine, which was completed in 2017, starts at about kilometre 215 of Highway 37 and crosses the Bell-Irving River roughly 30 kilometres (19 mi) south-southeast of Bell II. About 20 kilometres (12 mi) southwest of Bell 2 Lodge, the Treaty Creek Access Road leaves the highway and crosses the Bell-Irving River toward the planned processing and tailings area of Seabridge Gold's KSM copper-gold project. The 17-kilometre (11 mi) road and its bridge over the Bell-Irving were complete by January 2024. BC Hydro's Treaty Creek Terminal, a switching station beside Highway 37 near the road's junction that connects the project to the Northwest Transmission Line, was energized on August 27, 2026.
