= Tsetsaut =

Wetaŀ

Total population
- extinct (since 1927, 30 (2019)) 30 (2019) (including those of ancestral descent)

Languages
- Tsetsaut (formerly)

The Tsetsaut (Nisga'a language: Jits'aawit; in the Tsetsaut language: Wetaŀ or Wetaɬ) were an Athabaskan-speaking group whose territory was around the head of the Portland Canal, straddling what is now the boundary between the US state of Alaska and the Canadian province of British Columbia. The name T'set'sa'ut, meaning "those of the Interior", was used by the Nisga'a and Gitxsan in reference to their origin as migrants into the region from somewhere farther inland; their use of the term is not to the Tsetsaut alone but also can refer to the Tahltan and the Sekani.

Other than Nisga'a stories about them, little is known about the Tsetsaut other than fragments of their language collected from two Tsetsaut slaves of the Nisga'a interviewed by Franz Boas in 1894.

== Demise ==
In 1830 their numbers were estimated to be up to 500, at which point they were living in the Behm Canal, where they had been friendly with the Sanya kwaan of the Tlingit and Lakweip at which point they moved to the Portland Canal. Decimated by attacks and disease, the surviving Tsetsaut, estimated at 12 in 1895, came under the protection of the Nisga'a Eagle clan chief, Sim'oogit "Sganisim Sim'oogit" (Sim'oogit means "chief"). Since the death of the remaining Tsetsaut, that chiefly lineage is now in possession of the Tsetsaut legacy in native law.

According to Teit, Tsetsaut territory "...lay in a strip from near Bradfield Canal and the Iskut across the streams flowing into Behm Canal perhaps to about the head of Boca de Quadra. They occupied all of the upper part of Portland Canal around the BC town of Stewart, and Salmon and Bear Rivers. They may have come down the canal as far as Maple Bay. They occupied all the White River and Meziadin Lake basins and one of their original headquarters, especially for salmon fishing, was at Meziadin Lake. They stretched across the head of the Skeena River above the Kuldo River over to Bear and Sustut lakes "
