= Last Frontier Heliskiing =

Backcountry heliskiing destination in Canada

- Location: Northern British Columbia
- Nearest city: Smithers
- Skiable area: 10,100 km^{2} (3,900 sq mi)
- Trails: 800
- Snowfall: 25 metres per year (82 ft/a)
- Website: Last Frontier Heliskiing

Last Frontier Heliskiing is a backcountry heliskiing destination located in the Skeena Mountains and Coast Mountains of Northern British Columbia. Founded in 1996, Last Frontier Heliskiing operates out of two locations: Bell 2 Lodge on the Stewart-Cassiar Highway in Bell II, and the Ripley Creek Inn, in Stewart. Last Frontier Heliskiing is a heliskiing operator within the province of British Columbia (List of heli-skiing operators in B.C.) with access to 10,100 square kilometres (3,900 sq mi) of skiable terrain.

== Company history ==
Ernie Kreese built the original building foundations of the Bell 2 Crossing in 1979 as a basic gas station and garage. Bell 2 Lodge is located at the second bridge crossing over the Bell-Irving River on the Stewart-Cassiar Highway, one of the two main highways linking British Columbia and Alaska. Later, a small restaurant and multiple cabins were added to the facility. In 1994, the founding partners of Last Frontier Heliskiing, George Rosset, Franz Fux, Mike Watling and Geoff Straight discovered Bell 2. They set on to explore the Skeena mountains surrounding Bell 2 to evaluate the potential for a new heliskiing destination. Satisfied with their find, they decided in 1996 to put the location to trial with an 8 weeks initial heliskiing program out of Bell 2 Lodge, using a single A-star helicopter. The film crew of Teton Gravity Research took this opportunity to explore this yet unmediated mountainous part of the world, which they initially captured in their movie 'Re-Session'. What once was a rustic and remote gas station became a heliski village since the purchase of Bell 2 lodge in 1996. Renovations between 1998 and 2003 occurred and lead to a full rebuilt and modernization of the lodge facilities.

Following the success of Bell 2 Lodge, The lead guides from Last Frontier Heliskiing George Feitzinger and Andre Ike explored the south of the tenure with the aim of establishing a whole new heliskiing zone deep into the coast mountains. Their findings lead to the establishment of a new heliskiing destination in 2005, the Ripley Creek Inn, located in Stewart.

== The Lodges ==
Bell 2 Lodge is located 340 kilometres (210 mi) northwest of Terrace in the locality of Bell II; the resort is situated along the Stewart-Cassiar Highway at the second crossing of the Bell-Irving River. The Ripley Creek Inn is located 310 kilometres (190 mi) northwest of Terrace in the town of Stewart, 3 km (2 mi) away from Hyder, Alaska.

== Mountain Safety ==
Last Frontier Heliskiing is a member of HeliCat Canada, an association seeking operating standards with regards to safety, risk management and sustainability within the heli and catskiing industry. All the guides at Last Frontier Heliskiing are ACMG or UIAGM certified mountain guides. Since 2008, Last Frontier Heliskiing has established mandatory for all guests and guides to wear an ABS Airbag pack in the mountains for avalanche safety reasons. The skiing guests and guides are all equipped with Avalanche transceivers, Avalanche airbags, shovels, and probes.

== Wildlife Preservation & Scientific Contributions ==
Since 2007, Last Frontier Heliskiing has taken active participation in scientific studies lead on the behavior of wild Mountain goats in order to analyze the impact and potential harm of helicopter operations happening within the goats’ natural habitat. General guidelines with regards to restricted and sensitive zones have been established as a response to these studies, in order to avoid causing any disturbances on endangered wildlife species with heliskiing activities.

== Professional Athletes ==
Last Frontier Heliskiing has hosted many well-known skiing and snowboarding professionals over the years.

=== Athletes ===
- Callum Pettit (2009)
- Cody Townsend (2012)
- Craig Kelly (1998)
- Christopher Rubens (2012)
- Dana Flahr (2009)
- Erik Jackson (2013)
- Jake Blauvelt (2012, 2013)
- Josh Daiek (2015)
- Kazuhiro Kokubo
- Kye Petersen (2009)
- Lynsey Dyer (2015)
- Mark McMorris (2015)
- Mikkel Bang (2015)
- Nicolas Muller (2015)
- Seth Morrison (2009, 2010, 2012)
- Tanner Hall (2002, 2009)
