= Northwest Transmission Line =

Electric power transmission line in British Columbia, Canada

The Northwest Transmission Line (NTL) is a 344-kilometre (214 mi), 287-kilovolt electric power transmission line in northwestern British Columbia, Canada, owned by BC Hydro. It runs north from BC Hydro's Skeena Substation near Terrace to a substation near Bob Quinn Lake, following the Stewart–Cassiar Highway (Highway 37) for much of its length. Built between 2012 and 2014, the line went into service on July 15, 2014, extending the provincial grid into a region where much of the electricity had been generated with diesel. Its final cost of about CA$746 million was nearly double the $404 million estimate announced in 2009.

The line was built to carry power from new run-of-river hydroelectric plants on the Iskut River into the grid and to supply electricity to proposed mines in the region. A 93-kilometre (58 mi) extension completed in December 2014 carries power north from Bob Quinn Lake to the Red Chris mine and the community of Iskut. A planned third phase of BC Hydro's North Coast Transmission Line would add a new 355-kilometre (221 mi) line from Terrace to Bob Quinn Lake.

== Route ==
The line begins at the Skeena Substation near Terrace, which is Kilometre 0 of the route and lies on the traditional territory of the Kitselas First Nation. From there it parallels an existing BC Hydro line along the Nisga'a Highway into the Nass River valley, then runs along the opposite side of the highway and continues north past the existing Meziadin Substation. It then follows Highway 37 north through the valley of the Bell-Irving River and over Ningunsaw Pass to a substation built for the project near Bob Quinn Lake. The design had to accommodate major crossings of the Skeena and Bell-Irving rivers and a narrow section of Nisga'a Memorial Lava Bed Provincial Park.

Beyond Bob Quinn Lake, the 287 kV Iskut extension continues 93 kilometres (58 mi) north to a BC Hydro substation at Tatogga Lake. From there, a 16-kilometre (9.9 mi) 287 kV line connects the Red Chris mine, and a 16-kilometre (9.9 mi) distribution line supplies Iskut. Imperial Metals described the combined corridor from Terrace to Tatogga Lake as 437 kilometres (272 mi) long.

== Design ==
The line has about 1,100 transmission structures. Roughly 1,000 of these are guyed-Y towers; the remaining 100 or so are self-supporting lattice steel towers or tubular steel monopoles, with the tower type chosen according to terrain, accessibility and environmental sensitivity. Spans between towers range from 95 to 1,090 metres (312 to 3,576 ft), with the longest spans used to cross major waterways without encroaching on wetlands and watercourses. Helicopters were used to erect towers along most of the route. The line uses about 2,100 kilometres (1,300 mi) of conductor.

== History ==
=== Planning and approval ===
Local and regional governments in northwestern British Columbia lobbied for construction of the line, which the mining industry saw as key to developing the region's mineral deposits. NovaGold Resources and Teck Resources, the owners of the proposed Galore Creek copper-gold mine, had originally been slated to contribute $158 million toward the line before they suspended development of that project.

In September 2009, Prime Minister Stephen Harper announced that the project would be eligible for up to $130 million from the federal Green Infrastructure Fund. Provincial energy minister Blair Lekstrom then committed the province to building the line, at an estimated cost of $404 million. In May 2010, BC Hydro, the British Columbia Transmission Corporation and a subsidiary of AltaGas signed agreements under which AltaGas would contribute $180 million toward the line and sell power from its Forrest Kerr hydroelectric project to BC Hydro. The estimated ratepayer contribution was $94 million, which was expected to be offset by payments from future generation projects and mines.

The provincial Environmental Assessment Office concluded that the project was not likely to have significant adverse effects. In February 2011, the province granted BC Hydro an environmental assessment certificate carrying 71 commitments, including fish habitat and wetland compensation plans to be developed in consultation with First Nations, the Nisga'a Nation and Fisheries and Oceans Canada. Federal environmental approval followed on May 6, 2011. BC Hydro chose the team of Valard Construction and Burns & McDonnell to design and build the line, with Golder Associates and Hatch selected for environmental and construction management services.

=== Construction and cost growth ===
Construction began in January 2012. Right-of-way clearing and access road construction were carried out under contract by the Nisga'a Nation and five First Nations. Valard and Burns & McDonnell built the line under a design-procure-construct contract, and Nanaimo-based F&M Installations built the substations. The project created about 840 person-years of employment.

Cost estimates rose steadily during construction. By April 2013, the estimate had reached $617 million, up from an early planning estimate of between $395 million and $404 million. Later in 2013, BC Hydro said the cost would top $700 million. BC Hydro vice-president Bruce Barrett attributed the increase to two factors. The first was competition with other industries in the region for workers, which meant labour and equipment had to be brought in from across the province. The second was that forest clearing and road building had significantly exceeded initial estimates. BC Hydro gave the final cost as $746 million. (Note: The Globe and Mail later reported the final cost as $736 million.) According to The Globe and Mail, BC Hydro said the project came in on budget, but it later paid its contractor a $100 million settlement after a protracted dispute.

=== Commissioning and Iskut extension ===
The line officially went into service on July 15, 2014. Its first customer was AltaGas, which fed power into the line from the Forrest Kerr project. BC Hydro marked the line's official completion with a ceremony at the Skeena Substation on August 13, 2014.

The Iskut extension was built by Highway 37 Power Corporation, a subsidiary of Imperial Metals, in partnership with the Tahltan Nation Development Corporation. The province exempted BC Hydro's purchase of the extension, its substations and the Iskut distribution line from review by the British Columbia Utilities Commission. By December 2014, power from the grid was energizing the Red Chris mine's substation and main processing equipment. On December 19, 2014, BC Hydro bought the extension from Imperial for $52 million. Iskut was connected to the grid the same month, seven months ahead of schedule, reducing the community's reliance on diesel generation. Red Chris produced its first copper concentrate in February 2015.

== Funding and criticism ==
The federal government contributed $130 million, and AltaGas, the line's anchor tenant, contributed $180 million. BC Hydro said the balance would be recovered through a new tariff applying to future users of the line.

The project's economics drew criticism. In 2013, The Tyee reported that BC Hydro had chosen to build a much larger line than needed to serve Red Chris or Iskut, because it had planned from the outset for the line to extend deeper into the northwest. The publication also quoted Marvin Shaffer, who argued that the industrial electricity rates paid by mines were far below BC Hydro's cost of developing new generation, which could impose large costs on ratepayers. In 2014, the operators of a wilderness lodge along the route told CBC News that they could not afford to connect to the line, and argued that major industrial users were being treated more favourably. BC Hydro said it was not feasible to tap directly into a high-voltage line and that it had to avoid subsidizing equipment costs for individual customers.

== Indigenous relations ==
The line crosses the traditional territories of several First Nations. The Kitselas First Nation, on whose territory the Skeena Substation stands, signed an impact benefit agreement with BC Hydro in 2010. In spring 2011, the Nisga'a Nation's legislature approved an impact benefit agreement. Members of the Tahltan Nation, through whose territory the line runs for roughly 70 kilometres (43 mi), voted 82 percent in favour of the project.

The Gitanyow and Lax Kw'alaams First Nations opposed BC Hydro's approach to negotiations at the time, and vowed to block the project until it changed. In April 2011, the Gitanyow said they would not support the line because BC Hydro was not addressing issues such as land management and habitat. They signed an impact benefit agreement with BC Hydro later that year; the Metlakatla First Nation also signed one.

== Connected facilities ==
AltaGas built three run-of-river hydroelectric plants on the Iskut River, in Tahltan territory, that deliver power to the line: Forrest Kerr (195 MW), which began operating in October 2014; Volcano Creek (16 MW), in December 2014; and McLymont Creek (66 MW), which began delivering power in October 2015. The plants connect to the Bob Quinn Substation through a line of about 40 kilometres (25 mi) built by AltaGas.

On the load side, the line supplies the Red Chris mine and Iskut through the Iskut extension. Seabridge Gold's proposed KSM copper-gold project will connect at BC Hydro's Treaty Creek Terminal, a switching station on the line beside Highway 37 south of Bell II, which was energized on August 27, 2026.

== North Coast Transmission Line ==
By the mid-2020s, BC Hydro said that potential electricity demand in the northwest, driven by new liquefied natural gas terminals and mining, exceeded the capacity of the existing transmission infrastructure. Its planned North Coast Transmission Line, a new line from Prince George to Terrace, was referred to the federal Major Projects Office on November 13, 2025. Construction of the first phase began on September 3, 2026. A third phase is planned to extend 355 kilometres (221 mi) northwest from Terrace to Bob Quinn Lake. In 2026, the federal government also committed about $44.2 million from its First and Last Mile Fund to BC Hydro's Northwest Transmission Line System Upgrades project. The government described this project as complementing the North Coast line by enhancing existing transmission infrastructure that will form part of that project's expansion.

== See also ==
- BC Hydro
- Stewart–Cassiar Highway
