= Meziadin Junction =

- Locality
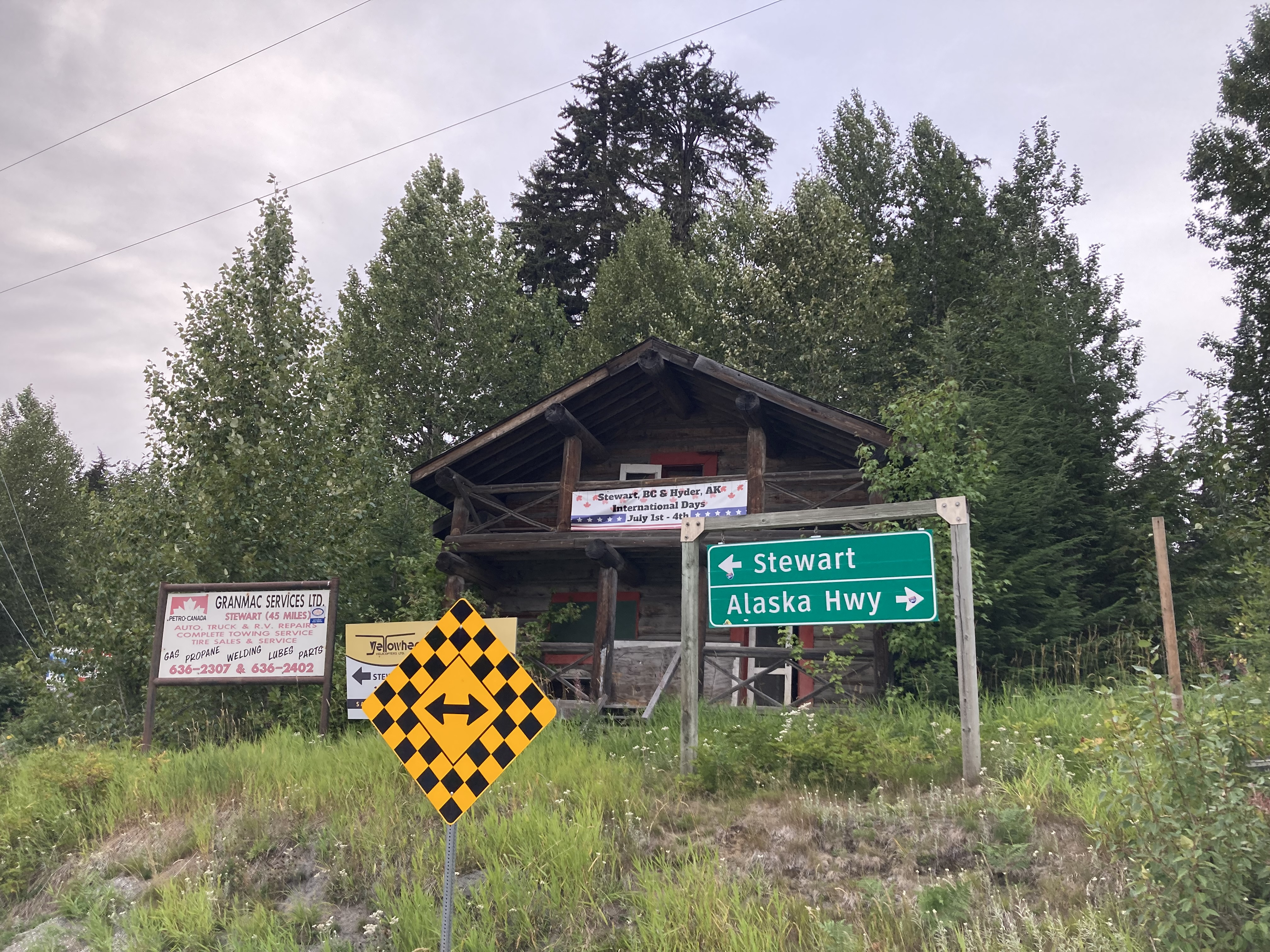
- Junction of BC 37 and 37a

- Location of Meziadin Junction in British Columbia
- Coordinates: 56°06′05″N 129°18′00″W
- Country: Canada
- Province: British Columbia
- Time zone: UTC−07:00 (PT)
- Area code: 250 / 778 / 236
- Highways: Highway 37; Highway 37A
- Website: http://meziadin.com

Meziadin Junction (/mɪˈziːədɪn/) is a work camp in northwest British Columbia, Canada, near the border with Alaska, United States. It is about 14 kilometres (9 mi) north of the Nass River crossing and 156 kilometres (97 mi) north of Kitwanga on Highway 37. The highway splits in its journey north from Terrace to Dease Lake, with one branch (Highway 37A) heading west over Bear Pass to Stewart and terminating at Hyder, Alaska. Meziadin Lake and its provincial park are nearby. The name "Meziadin" derives from the now-extinct Tsetsaut First Nations language.
