= Insomnia (2002 film) =

2002 film by Christopher Nolan

- Theatrical release poster
- Directed by: Christopher Nolan
- Screenplay by: Hillary Seitz
- Based on: Insomnia by: Nikolaj Frobenius; Erik Skjoldbjærg
- Produced by: Paul Junger Witt; Edward L. McDonnell; Broderick Johnson; Andrew A. Kosove
- Starring: Al Pacino; Robin Williams; Hilary Swank; Maura Tierney; Martin Donovan; Nicky Katt; Paul Dooley
- Cinematography: Wally Pfister
- Edited by: Dody Dorn
- Music by: David Julyan
- Production companies: Alcon Entertainment; Witt/Thomas Productions; Section Eight Productions
- Distributed by: Warner Bros. Pictures
- Release dates: May 3, 2002 (Tribeca); May 24, 2002 (United States)
- Running time: 118 minutes
- Country: United States
- Language: English
- Budget: $46 million
- Box office: $113.8 million

Insomnia is a 2002 American neo-noir psychological thriller film directed by Christopher Nolan from a screenplay by Hillary Seitz. It is a remake of the 1997 Norwegian film of the same name. The film stars Al Pacino, Robin Williams, and Hilary Swank, with Maura Tierney, Martin Donovan, Nicky Katt, and Paul Dooley in supporting roles. It follows two Los Angeles homicide detectives investigating a murder in Nightmute, Alaska. After the killer witnesses an accidental shooting committed by one of the detectives, they create a plan for both parties to mutually avoid prosecution.

Insomnia premiered at the Tribeca Festival on May 3, 2002, and was theatrically released in the United States and Canada on May 24, 2002 by Warner Bros. Pictures. It grossed $113.8 million worldwide against a production budget of $46 million. The film received positive reviews, with praise for Pacino's and Williams's performances. At the 29th Saturn Awards, Williams was nominated for Best Supporting Actor, and Seitz was nominated for Best Writing.

== Plot ==
In Nightmute, Alaska, teenager Kay Connell is found beaten to death, her body scrubbed of forensic evidence and dumped naked in a landfill. At the request of the local chief, LAPD detectives Will Dormer and Hap Eckhart are sent to assist with the investigation. Ellie Burr, a young local detective who idolizes Dormer, is assigned as their guide. They question Kay's abusive boyfriend Randy Stetz, who admits he discovered Kay had a secret admirer but could not force her to reveal his identity. In private, Eckhart admits he is being pressured by an Internal Affairs investigation and will testify against Dormer in exchange for immunity.

Kay's backpack is discovered at a shack near the coast and Dormer uses it to set a trap, but this backfires and the suspect flees into a heavy fog, shooting an officer in the leg. Giving pursuit, Dormer spots an unidentifiable figure and fires at them with his backup weapon after his sidearm jams. Grabbing a .38 caliber pistol the suspect dropped, Dormer rushes to the figure and discovers he has shot and killed Eckhart. The police assign blame to the suspect and Dormer does not dissuade them, knowing Internal Affairs will never believe the shooting was an accident due to Eckhart's pending testimony.

Burr is assigned to the shooting investigation and finds the .38 bullet that pierced the officer's leg. That night, Dormer fires the .38 into an animal carcass, then retrieves and cleans the bullet. At the morgue, the pathologist gives him the 9 mm caliber bullet from Eckhart's body, which she doesn't recognize as very few people in the area own pistols. Dormer replaces it with the .38 bullet. When Burr believes the case is closed, however, Dormer's conscience refuses to let him sign off and he tells her to do another review, which causes her to notice inconsistencies in his statement.

Dormer becomes plagued by insomnia, brought on by his guilt and further exacerbated by the perpetual daylight. He begins receiving phone calls from the killer, who witnessed Dormer shoot his partner. Questioning her estranged best friend, Dormer learns Kay was a fan of local crime writer Walter Finch, and realizes he was her secret admirer based on the alias she gave him. Dormer goes to Finch's apartment in a nearby village and breaks in, hiding the .38 in a heating vent. Returning home, Finch realizes someone is inside and escapes after a chase.

Finch contacts Dormer again and arranges a public meeting on a ferry. Finch wants help shifting suspicion to Randy, offering to stay silent about the Eckhart shooting in return. Attempting to dissuade him from this, Dormer tells Finch he can't hide his relationship with Kay and gives advice on handling the inevitable police questioning. As Finch leaves the ferry, he reveals he has recorded the conversation.

In another phone call, Finch admits he flew into a blind rage after Kay laughed at his romantic advances, stressing that her death was "an accident." Having lied that he lost the gun, Dormer suggests Kay's dress would be sufficient evidence to implicate Randy. The next day, Finch is questioned and mentions that Kay described Randy's abuse to him in her letters. Finch then claims Randy threatened Kay with a gun, and Dormer realizes his trap has again failed. Randy is arrested when the .38 is found in his house. Finch asks Burr to come to his lake house the next day to collect Kay's letters.

Returning to the cabin, Burr discovers a 9mm shell casing. She reads her police academy thesis about one of Dormer's cases and realizes he carries a 9mm as a backup weapon. After trashing his room in an attempt to block the sunlight coming through the window, Dormer confides in the hotel clerk about the Internal Affairs investigation: he fabricated evidence against a pedophile he was certain had murdered one of his victims, and the conviction (among many others) would have been overturned had Eckhart testified. When he tries to justify this to himself, the clerk asks him if it's something he's willing to live with.

Dormer breaks into Finch's apartment again and discovers Kay's letters. Realizing Burr is being lured into a trap, he rushes to Finch's lake house, where Finch reveals he has Kay's dress before knocking Burr unconscious. Dormer arrives and confronts Finch, but is disorientated from lack of sleep and overpowered before Burr revives and drives Finch off. She tells Dormer she knows he shot Eckhart, and he admits he is no longer certain it was an accident. Finch retrieves a shotgun from his boathouse and begins shooting; Burr returns fire while Dormer outflanks Finch. In a struggle Dormer wrestles the shotgun away, but Finch draws Burr's gun and they shoot each other, resulting in both of them being respectively wounded and killed. Attempting to comfort the mortally wounded Dormer, Burr moves to throw away the shell casing that proves his guilt. Dormer stops her, telling her not to lose her way as he did, before dying.

== Cast ==
- Al Pacino as Will Dormer
- Robin Williams as Walter Finch
- Hilary Swank as Ellie Burr
- Maura Tierney as Rachel Clement
- Martin Donovan as Hap Eckhart
- Nicky Katt as Fred Duggar
- Paul Dooley as Chief Nyback
- Jonathan Jackson as Randy Stetz
- Larry Holden as Farrell
- Katharine Isabelle as Tanya Francke
- Crystal Lowe as Kay Connell
- Jay Brazeau as Francis
- Kerry Sandomirsky as Trish Eckhart
- Lorne Cardinal as Rich
- Paula Shaw as the coroner

== Production ==
Jonathan Demme was originally attached to direct the film and considered Harrison Ford for the role of Will Dormer. According to Christopher Nolan, he became aware of the original Norwegian film even before the release of his directorial debut Following, and sought to remake it after watching it twice.

=== Casting ===
Insomnia has Robin Williams playing a villain, deviating from the comedic roles for which he was earlier known. Regarding his decision to cast Williams, Nolan said, "I think [audiences] will come away feeling like they have seen a 'new' Robin Williams. Seeing Robin Williams doing something they would have never imagined that he would or could do."

Nolan on Williams's acting:

What I thought of Robin, was, well he is an extraordinary guy to work with and he really gave what I consider to be a flawless performance. I wound up watching the film hundreds of times as we cut it, and I never hit that point with the performance where you start to see the acting. Most performances, at a point, bits start to peel off and away, but with Robin's he was very much in that character. Not that he's a very dark person to work with – he's very lively and friendly and amusing to work with. He really found something within himself. I think it's a very underrated bit of work on his part.

In 2026, Nicolas Cage told The New York Times that he was offered a role in the film but he declined; he did not say which part he was offered.

=== Filming ===
Insomnia was filmed over a three-month period from April to June 2001. The opening aerial scene was filmed over the Columbia Glacier near Valdez, Alaska, and the float plane approach was over the Portland Canal near Hyder, Alaska, and Stewart, British Columbia. The town of Nightmute, Alaska, was primarily filmed in and around Squamish, British Columbia, including the hotel/lodge, police station, high school and cemetery. The scene in which Dormer shoots his partner on the rocky beach in the fog was filmed at Clementine Creek in Indian Arm, outside of Vancouver. The village of Umkumuit, where Finch's apartment is located and where the log-chase scene occurs, was filmed on Vancouver Island in Port Alberni. The waterfall road scene in which Dormer is on his way to Finch's lake house and spins his car 180 degrees was shot in front of Bridal Veil Falls on the Richardson Highway near Valdez, Alaska.

The final scene, on the fictional Lake Kgun at Finch's lake house, was filmed on the northwest end of Strohn Lake in Bear Glacier Provincial Park, outside of Stewart, British Columbia. For this final scene, the film crew constructed Finch's lake house and dock from scratch, and disassembled and removed it after filming was completed in June 2001.

== Reception ==
=== Critical response ===
On review aggregator Rotten Tomatoes, the film holds an approval rating of 92%, based on 203 reviews, with an average rating of 7.80/10. The site's critical consensus reads: "Driven by Al Pacino and Robin Williams's performances, Insomnia is a smart and riveting psychological drama." On Metacritic, the film holds a weighted average score of 78 out of 100, based on 37 critics, indicating "generally favorable" reviews. Audiences polled by CinemaScore gave the film an average grade of "B" on a scale of A+ to F.

Roger Ebert of the Chicago Sun-Times said, "Unlike most remakes, the Nolan Insomnia is not a pale retread, but a re-examination of the material, like a new production of a good play."

Erik Skjoldbjærg, the director of the original film, said of Nolan's reinterpretation:

It was quite close, stylistically, to the original. I felt lucky that it's such a well crafted, smart film and that it had a really good director handling it, because as a remake I think it did really well, and it doesn't hurt any original if a remake is well done. So I felt I was lucky that Christopher Nolan took it upon himself to do it.

Taste of Cinema complimented Nolan for being able to "capture the excitement of the original while still setting it apart as a notable film itself".

IndieWire included Insomnia in their "10 Remakes of Classics by Great Auteurs" list, writing, "Nolan shifts the moral ground from the snowballing moral corruption of the original to shades of guilt and accountability and Pacino's increasingly bleary and hallucinatory perspective becomes an evocative metaphor for his struggle."

Later, Nolan singled out Insomnia as his most underrated film:

I'm very proud of the film. I think, of all my films, it's probably the most underrated. [...] The reality is it's one of my most personal films in terms of what it was to make it. It was a very vivid time in my life. It was my first studio film, I was on location, it was the first time I'd worked with huge movie stars. [...] That's not really for me to say, but every now and again I meet a filmmaker and that's actually the film that they're interested in or want to talk about. Yeah, very proud of the film.

=== Accolades ===
Award	Date of ceremony	Category	Recipient(s)	Result	Ref.
Edgar Awards	May 1, 2003	Best Motion Picture Screenplay	Hillary Seitz	Nominated	
Empire Awards	February 5, 2003	Best Actress	Hilary Swank	Nominated	
Golden Trailer Awards	March 13, 2003	Best Horror / Thriller	Insomnia	Nominated	
London Film Critics' Circle Award	February 12, 2003	British Director of the Year	Christopher Nolan	Won	
London Film Critics' Circle Award	February 12, 2003	Actor of the Year	Al Pacino	Nominated	
Satellite Awards	January 12, 2003	Best Editing	Dody Dorn	Nominated	
Saturn Awards	May 18, 2003	Best Supporting Actor	Robin Williams	Nominated	
Saturn Awards	May 18, 2003	Best Writing	Hillary Seitz	Nominated	

== Novelization ==
A novelization by Robert T. Westbrook was published by Onyx in May 2002.

== Bibliography ==
- Kirsch, Konrad (2024). From ›Doodlebug‹ to ›Oppenheimer‹. An Analysis of Christopher Nolan's Film Work. Stuttgart / London: Edition Axel Menges. ISBN 978-3-86905-037-9.
