= Mount Rainey =

Mountain in British Columbia, Canada

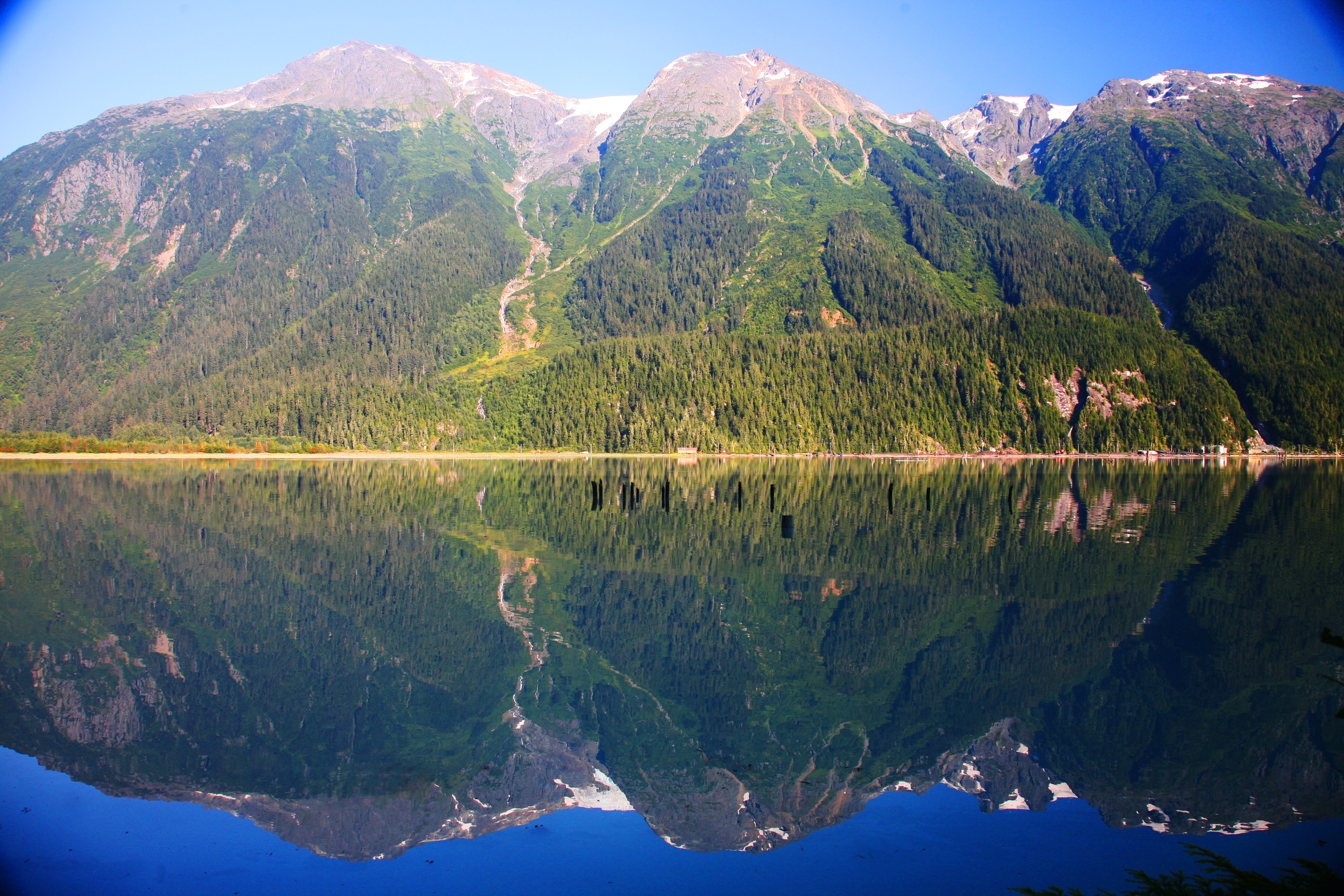
- West aspect, reflected in Portland Canal

Highest point
- Elevation: 1,983 m (6,506 ft)
- Prominence: 263 m (863 ft)
- Parent peak: Mount Magee (2025 m)
- Isolation: 2.23 km (1.39 mi)
- Coordinates: 55°54′35″N 129°56′13″W

Naming
- Etymology: Bob Rainey

Geography
- Location within British Columbia Location within Canada
- Interactive map of Mount Rainey
- Location: British Columbia, Canada
- District: Cassiar Land District
- Parent range: Coast Mountains; Boundary Ranges
- Topo map: NTS 103P13 Stewart

Mount Rainey is a 1,983-metre (6,506-foot) summit located in the Coast Mountains of British Columbia, Canada. It is situated 5 kilometres (3.1 miles) southeast of Stewart, British Columbia, and 5 kilometres (3.1 miles) east of Hyder, Alaska. The nearest higher neighbor is Mount Magee, 2.26 km (1.40 mi) to the east-northeast. This mountain's toponym was officially adopted 4 May 1926 on Geological Survey sheet 193A, and confirmed by the Geographical Names Board of Canada in 1953 to remember Robert "Bob" Rainey, the first locator on this mountain who was killed on his mineral claim near Stewart. Precipitation runoff from the mountain drains into the Portland Canal. Topographic relief is significant as the summit rises 1,983 metres (6,506 feet) above tidewater of the fjord in 4 kilometres (2.5 miles).

== Climate ==
Based on the Köppen climate classification, Mount Rainey is located in a subarctic climate zone of western North America. Most weather fronts originate in the Pacific Ocean, and travel east toward the Coast Mountains where they are forced upward by the range (Orographic lift), causing them to drop their moisture in the form of rain or snowfall. As a result, the Coast Mountains experience high precipitation, especially during the winter months in the form of snowfall. Temperatures can drop below −20 °C with wind chill factors below −30 °C.

== Gallery ==
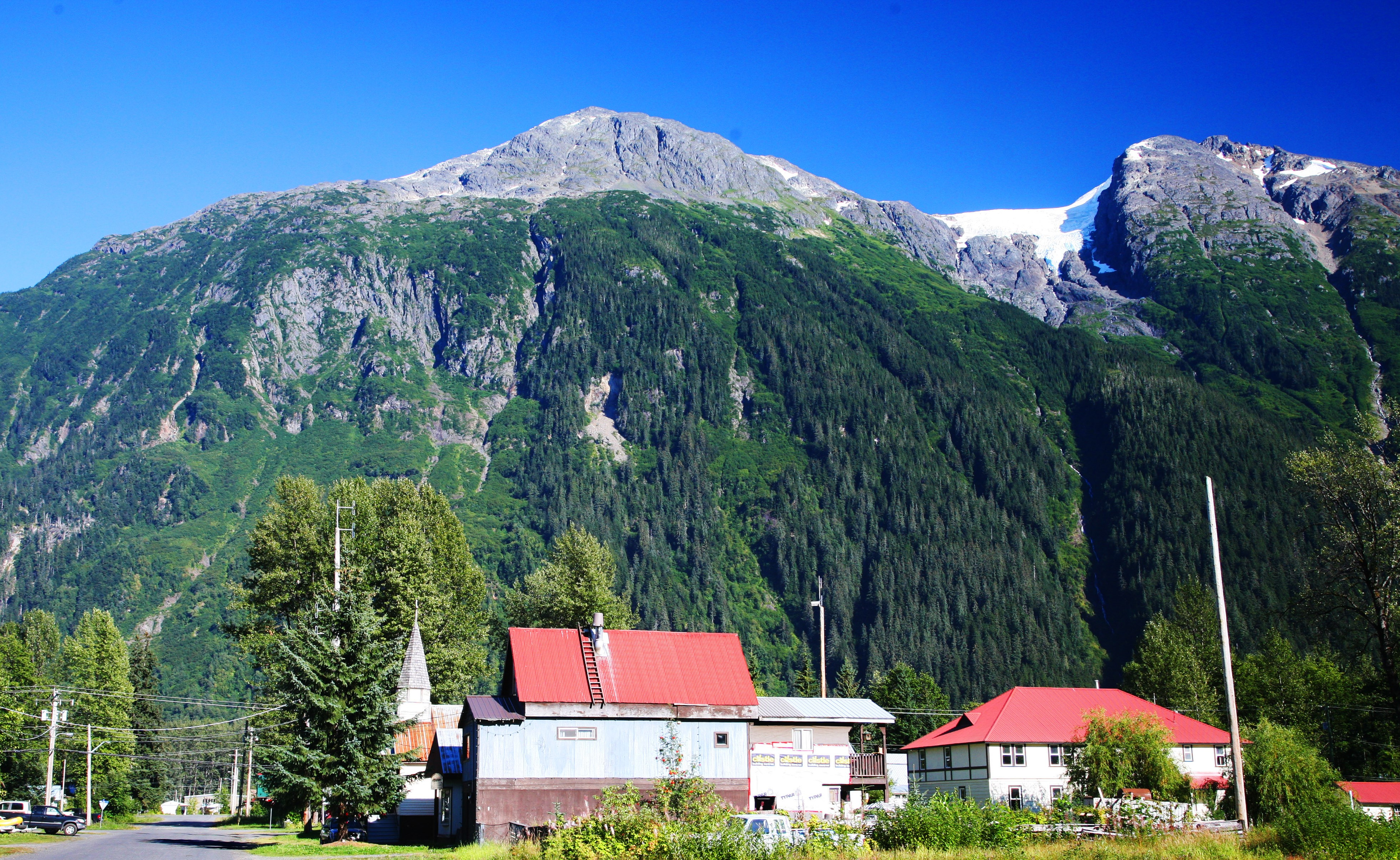
Mt. Rainey from Stewart, BC, Canada. Summit in upper right corner.

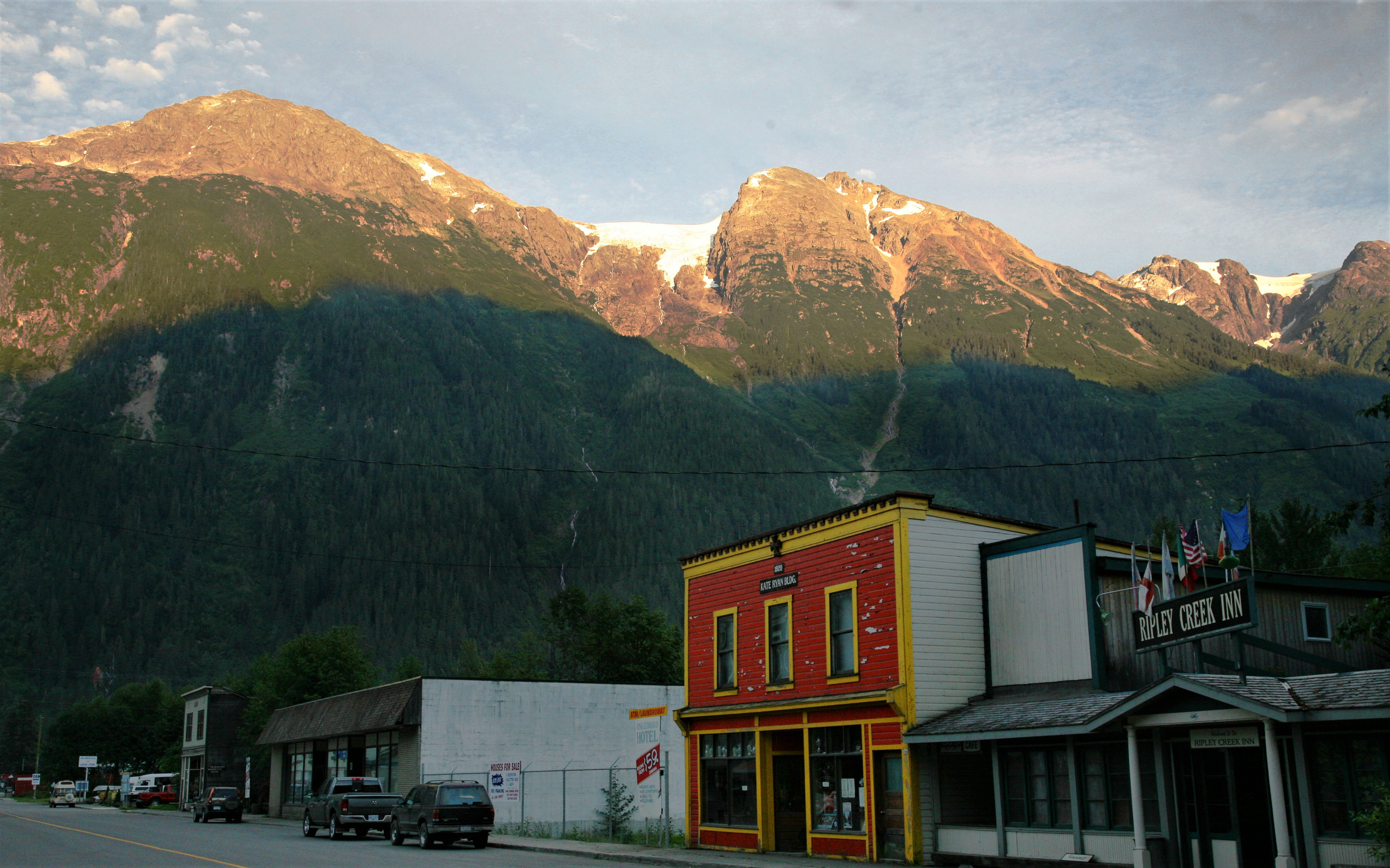
Mt. Rainey seen from Stewart

== See also ==
- Otter Mountain
