= Bear Glacier Provincial Park =

Provincial park in British Columbia, Canada

- IUCN category II (national park)
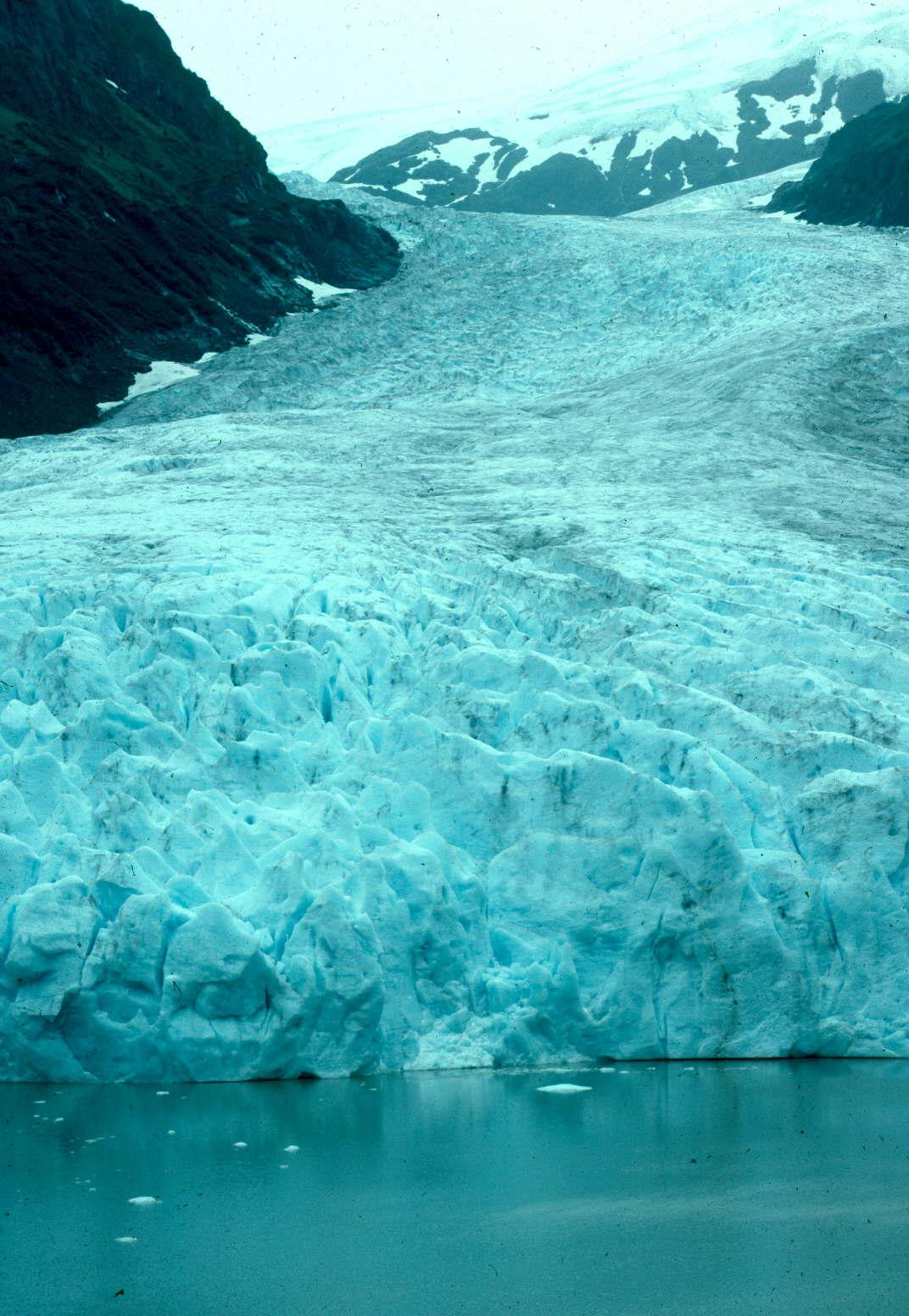
- View looking up the glacier in 1985

- Location within British Columbia
- Interactive map of Bear Glacier Provincial Park
- Location: Cassiar Land District, British Columbia, Canada
- Nearest city: Smithers, BC
- Coordinates: 56°05′59″N 129°40′17″W
- Area: 542 ha (1,340 acres)
- Established: May 11, 2000
- Governing body: BC Parks

Bear Glacier Provincial Park is a provincial park in British Columbia, Canada. The park is 542 ha (1,340 acres) in size and was established, effective May 11, 2000, by the Nisga'a Treaty, Appendix G-3.

The toe of Bear Glacier is visible from British Columbia Highway 37A roughly halfway between the Meziadin Junction and Stewart.

The glacier was part of the closing scene in the film "Insomnia" with Al Pacino.
