= Meziadin Lake Provincial Park =

Provincial park in British Columbia

- IUCN category II (national park)
- Location within British Columbia
- Interactive map of Meziadin Lake Provincial Park
- Location: British Columbia, Canada
- Nearest city: Smithers
- Coordinates: 56°05′14″N 129°18′07″W
- Area: 3.35 km^{2} (1.29 sq mi)
- Established: December 4, 1987
- Governing body: BC Parks

Meziadin Lake Provincial Park /mɪˈziːədɪn/ is a provincial park in British Columbia, Canada. It sits 40 miles (64 km) east of Stewart, British Columbia.
