= Tsetsaut language =

Extinct Athabaskan language

Tsetsaut
- Tsʼetsaʼut
- Wetaŀ, Wetaɬ, Wetał
- Pronunciation: [wetaɬ]
- Native to: Canada, United States
- Region: Northern British Columbia, Alaska
- Ethnicity: Tsetsaut
- Extinct: 1927
- Language family: Na-Dené: Athabaskan; Northern Athabaskan; Tsetsaut

Official status
- Official language in: Alaska

Language codes
- ISO 639-3: txc
- Glottolog: tset1236
- Tsetsaut is classified as Extinct by the UNESCO Atlas of the World's Languages in Danger.

The Tsetsaut language is an extinct Athabaskan language formerly spoken by the now-extinct Tsetsaut in the Behm and Portland Canal area of Southeast Alaska and northwestern British Columbia. Virtually everything known of the language comes from the limited material recorded by Franz Boas in 1894 from two Tsetsaut slaves of the Nisga'a, which is enough to establish that Tsetsaut formed its own branch of Athabaskan. It is not known precisely when the language became extinct, but it was around the 1930s. One speaker was still alive in 1927. The Nisga'a name for the Tsetsaut people is "Jits'aawit".

The Tsetsaut referred to themselves as the Wetaŀ. The English name Tsetsaut is an anglicization of [tsʼətsʼaut], "those of the interior", used by the Gitxsan and Nisga'a to refer to the Athabaskan-speaking people to the north and east of them, including not only the Tsetsaut but some Tahltan and Sekani.

== Vocabulary ==
The examples by Merritt Ruhlen:

- ɬoʔ fish
- xɔ grizzly bear
- xadzinε male deer
- qax rabbit
- goʔ snake
- ts’alε frog
- ts’esdja mosquito
- tsrāmaʔ wasp
- at’ɔ nest
- εkyagɔ ankle
- aɬʼɔqʼ liver
- dlε dance
- kwuɬʼ dirt
- na mother
- täʼ father
- isča grandchild
- axa hair
- aɬa(ʔ) hand
- txa kick
- mmē lake
- xutsʼedeʼ left

== Bibliography ==
- "Ts'ets'aut, an Athapascan Language from Portland Canal, British Columbia". International Journal of American Linguistics. 3 (1): 1–35. July 1924. doi:10.1086/463746. ISSN 0020-7071.
- Collison, W. H. (1915) In the Wake of the War Canoe: A Stirring Record of Forty Years' Successful Labour, Peril and Adventure amongst the Savage Indian Tribes of the Pacific Coast, and the Piratical Head-Hunting Haida of the Queen Charlotte Islands, British Columbia. Toronto: Musson Book Company. Reprinted by Sono Nis Press, Victoria, B.C. (ed. by Charles Lillard), 1981.
- Dangeli, Reginald (1999) "Tsetsaut History: The Forgotten Tribe of Southern Southeast Alaska." In: Alaska Native Writers, Storytellers & Orators: The Expanded Edition, ed. by Ronald Spatz, Jeane Breinig, and Patricia H. Partnow, pp. 48–54. Anchorage: University of Alaska.
