= Salmon Glacier =

Glacier in Canada

- View of the Salmon Glacier from the viewpoint. Mount Bayard to left, Mount White-Fraser partially visible to right.
- Interactive map of Salmon Glacier
- Type: Valley glacier
- Location: Boundary Ranges; British Columbia
- Coordinates: 56°07′N 130°04′W

The Salmon Glacier is a glacier located ~25 km (16 mi) north of Stewart, British Columbia, and Hyder, Alaska, just on the Canadian side of the border. The glacier, one of hundreds in the Boundary Ranges, is notable for its major potential as a natural hazard. Summit Lake is located at the northern end of the glacier and every year around mid-July the lake breaks an ice-dam and then flows under the Salmon Glacier into the Salmon River. This causes the river to rise approximately 4–5 ft (1.2–1.5 m) for several days.

The glacier can be accessed by road from Hyder, Alaska, from early July to late September.

The glacier's name was officially adopted January 20, 1955, by the Geographical Names Board of Canada.

== Climate ==
Based on the Köppen climate classification, Salmon Glacier is located in the marine west coast climate zone of western North America. Most weather fronts originate in the Pacific Ocean, and travel east toward the Coast Mountains where they are forced upward by the range (Orographic lift), causing them to drop their moisture in the form of rain or snowfall. As a result, the Coast Mountains experience high precipitation, especially during the winter months in the form of snowfall. Temperatures can drop below −20 °C (−4 °F) with wind chill factors below −30 °C (−22 °F).

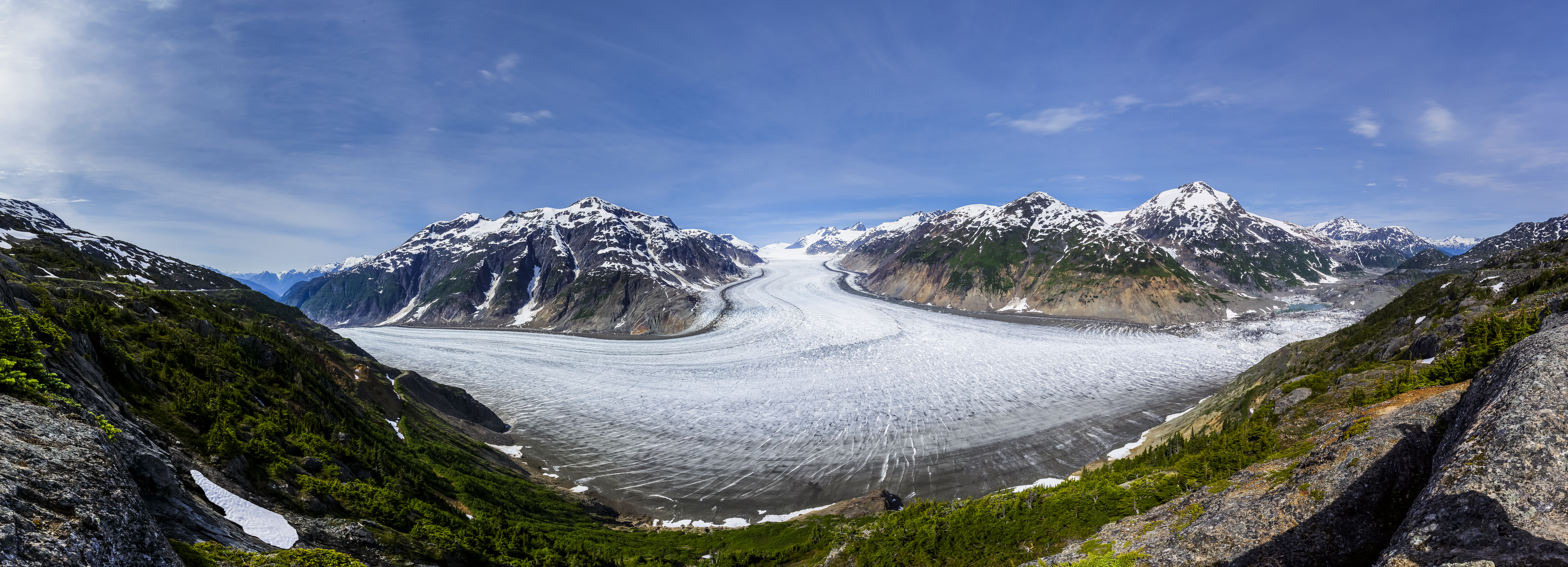
Panoramic view of Salmon Glacier

Climate data for Premier, British Columbia
Month	Jan	Feb	Mar	Apr	May	Jun	Jul	Aug	Sep	Oct	Nov	Dec	Year
Record high °F (°C)	50 (10)	55 (13)	60 (16)	69 (21)	80 (27)	85 (29)	90 (32)	88 (31)	83 (28)	70 (21)	56 (13)	45 (7)	90 (32)
Mean daily maximum °F (°C)	29 (−2)	33 (1)	38 (3)	47 (8)	56 (13)	63 (17)	65 (18)	66 (19)	58 (14)	45 (7)	35 (2)	29 (−2)	47 (8)
Mean daily minimum °F (°C)	20 (−7)	22 (−6)	26 (−3)	32 (0)	39 (4)	45 (7)	49 (9)	49 (9)	44 (7)	35 (2)	27 (−3)	22 (−6)	34 (1)
Record low °F (°C)	−22 (−30)	−20 (−29)	−2 (−19)	10 (−12)	28 (−2)	34 (1)	28 (−2)	35 (2)	28 (−2)	12 (−11)	4 (−16)	−14 (−26)	−22 (−30)
Average precipitation inches (mm)	11.67 (296)	7.77 (197)	7.01 (178)	4.60 (117)	2.73 (69)	2.63 (67)	3.01 (76)	4.00 (102)	6.79 (172)	12.48 (317)	11.54 (293)	11.77 (299)	86 (2,183)
Average snowfall inches (cm)	98.4 (250)	65.7 (167)	53.0 (135)	18.1 (46)	0.3 (0.76)	0 (0)	0 (0)	0 (0)	0 (0)	11.2 (28)	67.8 (172)	101.1 (257)	415.6 (1,055.76)
Source: NOAA

== See also ==
- List of glaciers
- Hyder, Alaska
- Stewart, British Columbia
