= Stewart–Cassiar Highway =

Highway in British Columbia

Highway 37
- Stewart–Cassiar Highway; Stikine Highway; Dease Lake Highway
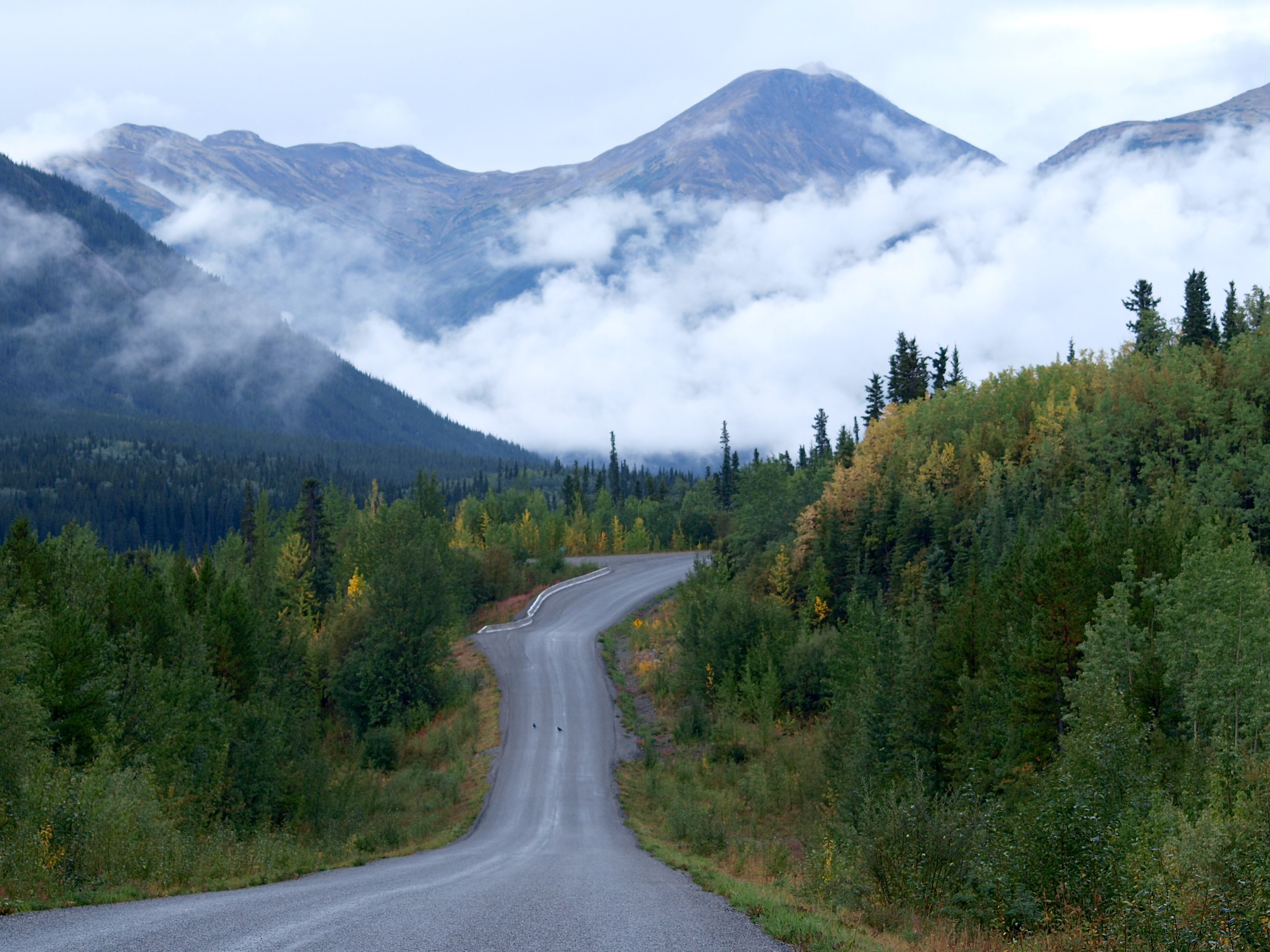
- Highway 37 near Good Hope Lake

Route information
- Length: 874.76 km (543.55 mi)
- Existed: 1975–present

Major junctions
- South end: Haisla Boulevard / Nalabila Boulevard / Kitimaat Village Road in Kitimat
- Highway 16 (TCH) in Terrace and Kitwanga; Highway 37A at Meziadin Junction
- North end: Hwy 1 near Upper Liard

Location
- Country: Canada

Highway system
- British Columbia provincial highways
- Territorial highways in Yukon; Miscellaneous
← Highway 35	BC	→ Highway 37A
← Hwy 11	YT	→ Hwy 1

The Stewart–Cassiar Highway, also known as the Dease Lake Highway and the Stikine Highway, as well as the Kitimat Highway from Kitimat to Terrace, is the northwestern-most highway in the Canadian province of British Columbia. A scenic route through some of the province's most isolated areas, the highway first gained designation as British Columbia Highway 37 in the year 1975. At that time, its southern terminus was at the community of New Hazelton on the BC Highway 16 (the Yellowhead Highway). In 1972, with the completion of a new bridge over the Nass River, the highway's Yellowhead junction was relocated to a point on Highway 16 just south of the site of Kitwanga. Highway 37 was then extended south to Kitimat in 1986 superseding what was then designated Highway 25. At the north end, the highway briefly stretches into the Yukon, becoming Yukon Highway 37.

== Route details ==
Highway 37 starts its 874 km (543 mi) journey in the south at Kitimat and 59 km (37 mi) north it reaches Terrace, where it merges onto the Yellowhead Highway. The Yellowhead coincides with Highway 37 east for 91 km (57 mi) to Kitwanga Junction, where the Yellowhead diverges east.

North of the Yellowhead's Kitwanga junction, Highway 37 travels 76 km (47 mi) to Cranberry Junction, and then another 80 km (50 mi) north to Meziadin Junction, where Highway 37A begins and heads west via Bear River Pass to Stewart and Hyder, Alaska. Highway 37 travels north through the Skeena Mountains for 333 km (207 mi) to the Continental Divide communities of Eddontenajon, Iskut and Dease Lake, which straddles the Stikine and Dease River basins. Another 116 km (72 mi) north and Highway 37 reaches Jade City, where a junction to the former asbestos-mining community of Cassiar is located. North of Jade City, Highway 37 travels another 120 km (75 mi) to its crossing of the 60th parallel into the Yukon Territory, becoming Yukon Highway 37 and terminating at a junction with the Alaska Highway near Upper Liard just 3.4 km (2.1 mi) later. According to the British Columbia Ministry of Transportation, "Most of the route is hard surface (either pavement or sealcoat) with approximately 1 km (0.6 mi) of gravel."

== History ==
The Highway 37 of today is the result of highway extension projects began in 1959.

Originally, a roadway extended south from the Alaska Highway to serve the Cassiar mining district, eventually reaching Dease Lake and joining a road to Telegraph Creek (sometimes referred to as Highway 51, but not signed as such). To the south, logging roads extended north almost as far as Meziadin Junction.

By 1968, the route of what is now 37A extended past Meziadin Junction north. This was done to allow for asbestos from Cassiar to be shipped to market via sea from Stewart. By the middle of 1972, only a few miles remained to be built between Meziadin Junction and Iskut. Four bicyclists, whose journey from Alaska to Montana was chronicled in a May 1973 National Geographic article, braved the muddy gap.

Once this route was completed, travellers only had to contend with limited hours for using the logging roads south of Meziadin Junction, roads which were upgraded during the 1970s. The completion of a new bridge over the Skeena River at Kitwanga in Mid-November 1975 gave better access to the Yellowhead Highway. Work continued through the mid-to-late 70s to upgrade the stretch of highway.

The Highway 37 corridor is slated for infrastructure enhancements as resource extraction activities increase in the Northwest region of British Columbia. The Northwest Transmission Line was constructed by BC Hydro and runs from Terrace, British Columbia to Bob Quinn Lake, largely paralleling the highway.

== Major intersections ==
Province/Territory	Regional District	Location	km	mi	Destinations	Notes
British Columbia	Kitimat-Stikine	Kitimat	0.00	0.00	Haisla Boulevard / Nalabila Boulevard / Kitimaat Village Road – Kitamaat Village	Highway 37 southern terminus
British Columbia	Kitimat-Stikine		24.92	15.48	Crosses Kitimat River	
British Columbia	Kitimat-Stikine	Terrace	57.70	35.85	Highway 16 (TCH/YH) west – Prince Rupert	South end of Highway 16 concurrency
British Columbia	Kitimat-Stikine	Kitwanga	148.30	92.15	Highway 16 (TCH/YH) east – Prince George	North end of Highway 16 concurrency; Stewart–Cassiar Highway southern terminus
British Columbia	Kitimat-Stikine	Kitwanga	148.50	92.27	Kitwanga Bridge crosses Skeena River	
British Columbia	Kitimat-Stikine	Cranberry Junction	223.85	139.09	Nass Forest Service Road – Gitlaxt'aamiks, Nass Camp, Nisga'a Lava Bed Park	
British Columbia	Kitimat-Stikine	Meziadin Junction	304.57	189.25	Highway 37A west – Stewart, Hyder	
British Columbia	Kitimat-Stikine		336.81	209.28	Crosses the Bell-Irving River	
British Columbia	Kitimat-Stikine	Bell II	400.20	248.67	Crosses the Bell-Irving River	
British Columbia	Kitimat-Stikine		588.22	365.50	Crosses the Stikine River	
British Columbia	Kitimat-Stikine	Dease Lake	639.34	397.27	Boulder Street (Unofficial Highway 51 west) – Telegraph Creek	To Highway 910:3601
British Columbia	Stikine Region (Unorganized)	No major junctions				
			871.37 0.00	541.44 0.00	British Columbia–Yukon border Highway 37 northern terminus; Hwy 37 southern terminus	
Yukon	Unorganized		3.39	2.11	Hwy 1 (Alaska Highway) – Whitehorse, Watson Lake	Highway 37 and Stewart–Cassiar Highway northern terminus
1.000 mi = 1.609 km; 1.000 km = 0.621 mi: Concurrency terminus; Route transition
