= Granduc Mine =

Copper mine in British Columbia, Canada

Coordinates: 56°14′35″N 130°04′45″W

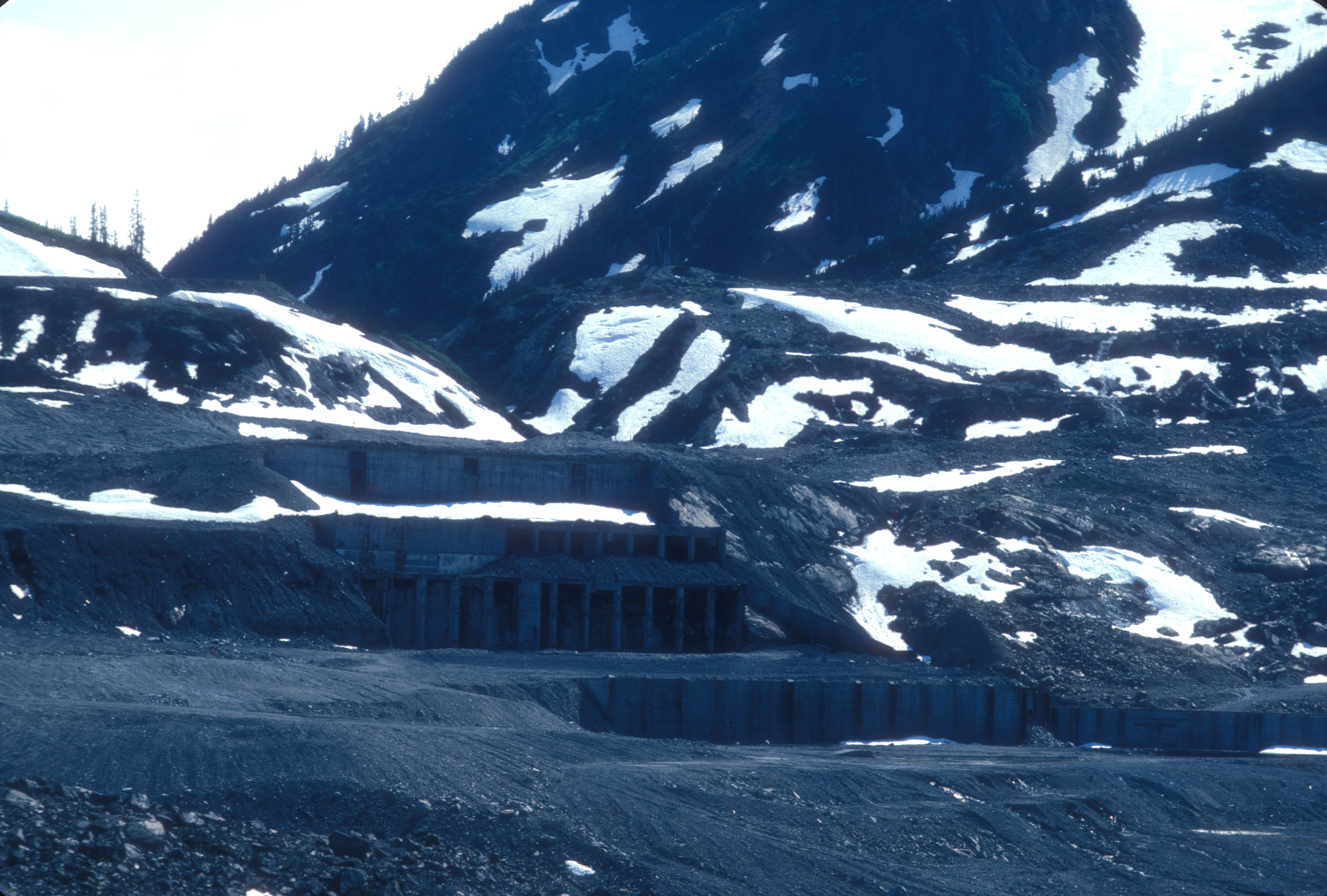
Granduc Copper Mine

Overlooking the Salmon Glacier, the Granduc Mine is a large copper mine which is situated on a rock ridge between a glacier and a cliff, some 22 miles (35 km) north of Stewart, BC at the north end of Summit Lake. It was an active mine from 1964 to 1984, having closed due to low copper prices.

== Location ==
The mine and its camp are inside the District Municipality of Stewart, connected by an access road connected to Hyder, Alaska and is situated on the Portland inlet. The mine site at Granduc has 17 km of access tunnel and a 54 km haulage road, which saw upgrades that began in June 2011.

== Exploration ==
First discovered in 1931, the property saw limited exploration in 1991 and again 1993 after its dormancy until 2005 when new exploration reopened interest in the property. Site construction and ground rehabilitation, began in 2014 with active production expected for 2016.

The site is divided into a Main Zone and a North Zone. Previous mining was only performed on the Main Zone.

Inventory in 1986 was reported as 9.89 million Metric tonnes grading 1.79 per cent copper, while recent results indicate resources stand at 10.4 million tonnes grading 1.25 per cent copper. Inferred resources of 36.6 million tonnes grading 1.26% copper are estimated.

== Tragedy ==
A large avalanche killed 28 men on February 18, 1965 when a snow slide hit the mine camp.

== See also ==
- List of ghost towns in British Columbia
- Hyder, Alaska
- Stewart, British Columbia
- Portland Canal
