= Salmon River (Portland Canal) =

Braided stream that flows through Hyder, Alaska, and empties into the Portland Canal

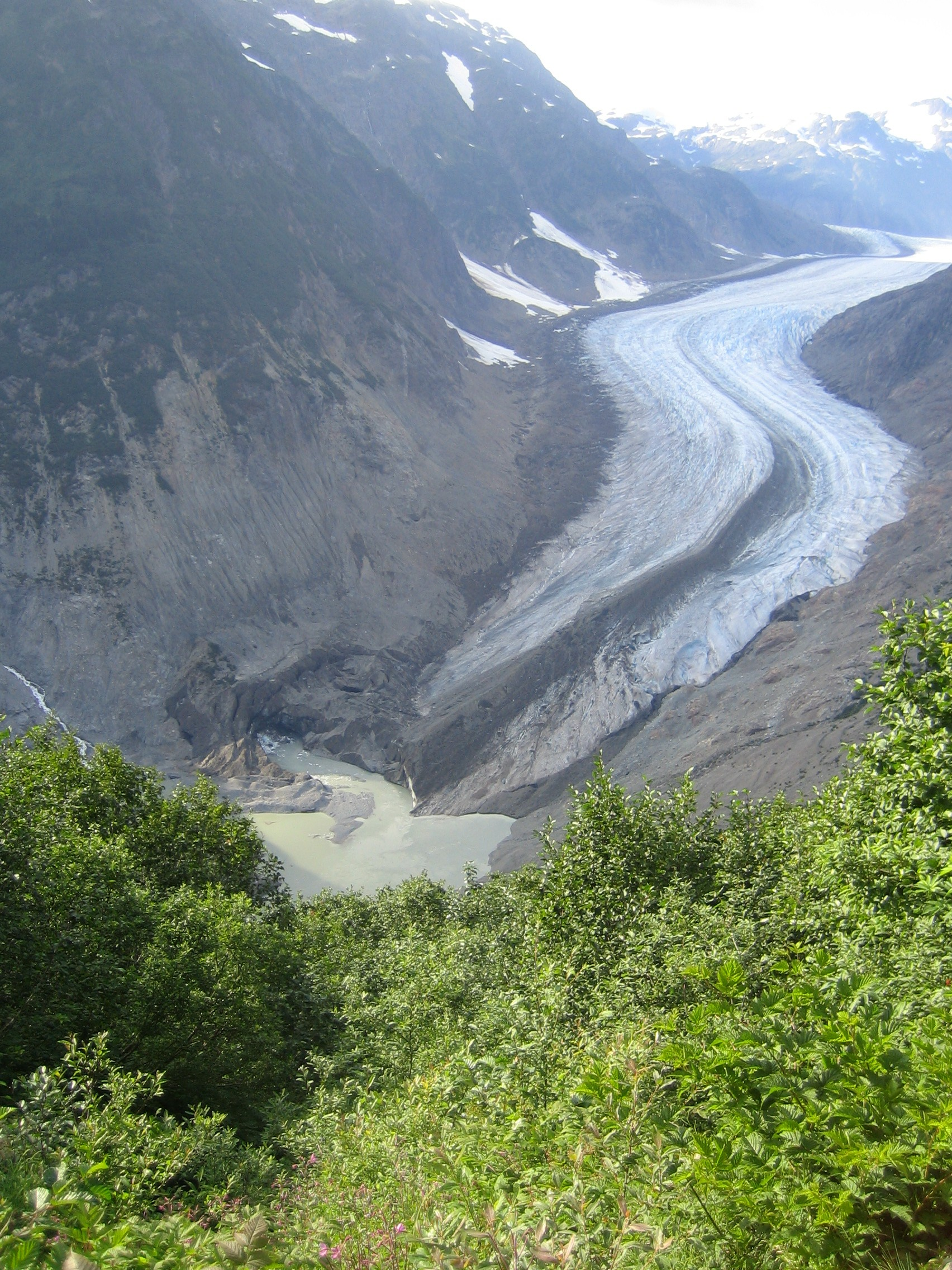
Toe of the Salmon Glacier where melt waters feed the Salmon River

The Salmon River is a braided stream that flows through Hyder, Alaska, and empties into the Portland Canal. It is fed by meltwater from the Salmon Glacier, which is located within British Columbia approximately 13 miles north of its confluence into the Canal and is road-accessible from the town of Stewart, British Columbia. The river crosses the Canada–United States border at 56°02′00″N 130°02′00″W.

== See also ==
- List of rivers of Alaska
- List of rivers of British Columbia
- Premier, British Columbia
