= Stewart, British Columbia =

Stewart
- District municipality
- District of Stewart
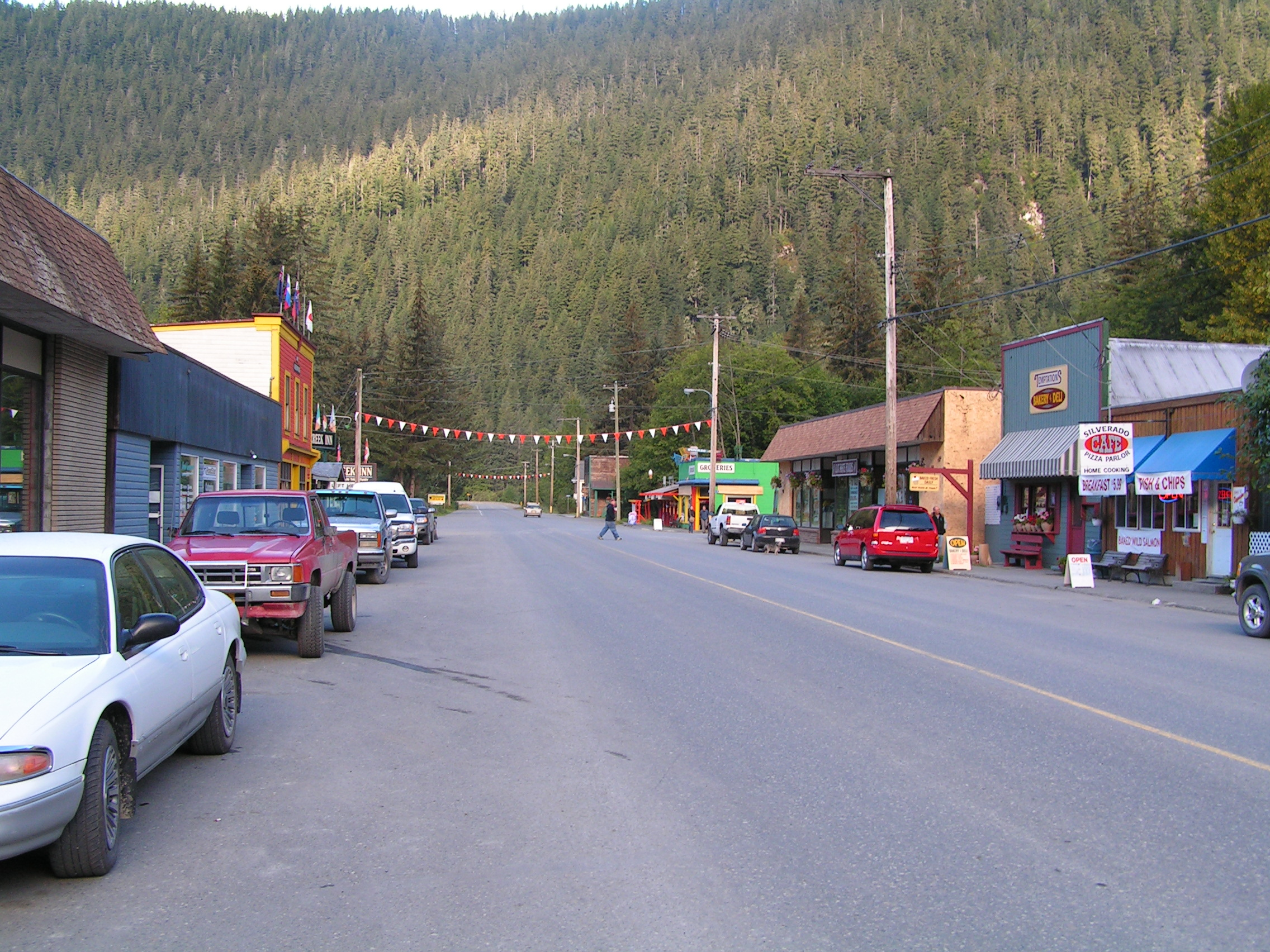

- Location within British Columbia
- Coordinates: 55°56′09″N 129°59′27″W
- Country: Canada
- Province: British Columbia
- Regional district: Kitimat–Stikine
- Incorporated (village): 16 May 1930
- Reincorporated (district): 27 June 1968

Government
  - Mayor: Roman Alexander

Area
  - Total: 552.08 km^{2} (213.16 sq mi)
- Elevation: 0 m (0 ft)

Population (2021)
  - Total: 517
  - Density: 0.936/km^{2} (2.43/sq mi)
- Time zone: UTC−07:00 (PT)
- Postal Code 0098: V0T 1W0
- Area codes: 250, 778, 236
- Highways: Highway 37A
- Website: districtofstewart.com

Stewart is a district municipality at the head of the Portland Canal in northwestern British Columbia, Canada, near the Alaskan panhandle. In 2021, it had a population of 517.

Founded as a mining town in the early 1900s, Stewart grew to about 10,000 people during a railway and mining boom in 1910–11 and shrank to 17 during the First World War. It is Canada's most northerly ice-free port and ships mineral concentrate from mines in northwestern British Columbia. The town is connected to the provincial highway network by Highway 37A and lies about 3 kilometres (2 mi) from Hyder, Alaska.

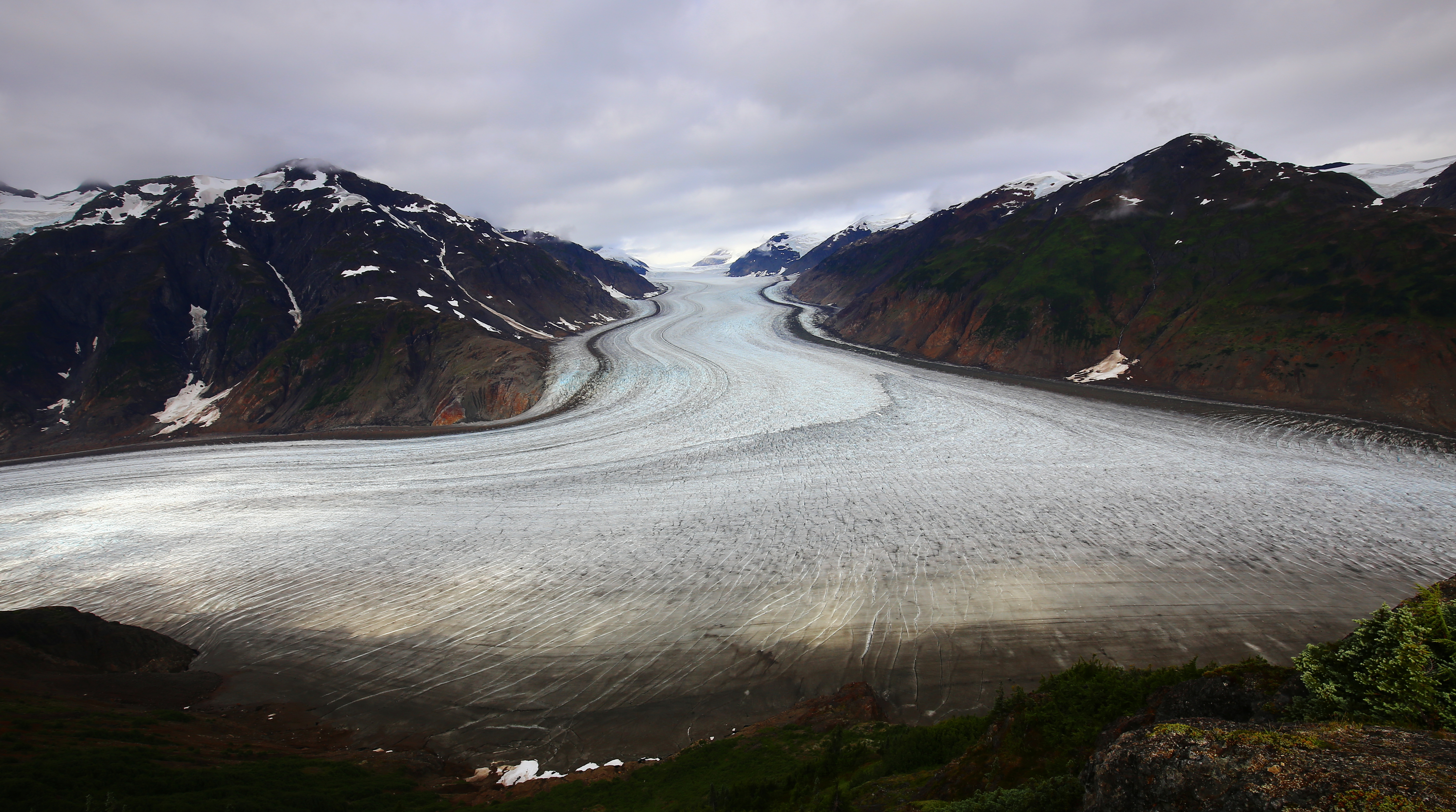
Salmon Glacier in British Columbia, a popular tourist destination.

== History ==
=== Indigenous peoples ===
The Nisga'a, who lived around the Nass River, called the head of Portland Canal Skam-A-Kounst, meaning "safe house" or "strong house", probably because it served them as a retreat from the harassment of the Haida and Tlingit from the outer coast. The name is now written Sgamagunt and refers to the whole Bear River valley; the Ayuukhl Nisga'a Department of the Nisga'a Tribal Council derives it from words meaning the entire valley regarded as the head or source of the inlet. The Nisga'a name for the Portland Canal as a whole is K'alii Xk'alaan, and the inlet was a common fishing and food-gathering place for them. They travelled in the area seasonally to pick berries and hunt birds.

The upper canal had also been occupied by the Tsetsaut people, known in Nisga'a as Jits'aawit, an Athapaskan people who became decimated by war and disease. The Stewart Historical Society's account is that the people it calls the Skam-a-kounst were driven out of the Stewart area by Haida or Nisga'a between 1856 and 1867. The Nisga'a account recorded by the BC Geographical Names Office is that the remaining Jits'aawit were taken under the protection of a Nisga'a Eagle chief, Sim'oogit Sganisim Sim'oogit (Mountain Chief), and that authority over the area passed to the Nisga'a in the late 1800s. A reserve on the east side of the mouth of the Bear River, Scamakounst Indian Reserve No. 19, was extinguished and converted to fee-simple land under the Nisga'a Final Agreement, which took effect on 11 May 2000.

=== Exploration and settlement ===
The Portland Canal was first explored and named in July 1793 by Captain George Vancouver in honour of William Cavendish-Bentinck, 3rd Duke of Portland (1738–1808), Home Secretary from 1794 to 1801. Vancouver met two friendly native people at the current site of Stewart. The area around the Portland Canal was again explored in 1896 by Captain D.D. Gaillard of the United States Army Corps of Engineers (after whom the Gaillard Cut in the Panama Canal was later named). Gaillard had been assigned to survey the canal while the Alaska boundary was still under negotiation. He reached its head on 2 September 1896 and built four stone storehouses along the canal, among them Storehouse No. 4 at Eagle Point in present-day Hyder. In 1903 the boundary between Canada and Alaska was placed along the middle of the canal.

Two years after Gaillard's visit, the first prospectors and settlers arrived. In 1898, during the Klondike Gold Rush, a Seattle promoter named Burgess claimed to have found placer gold at the head of the Nass River and brought 67 men up the Portland Canal on the chartered steamer Discovery. No gold was found and most of the party left. Among those who turned back was D. J. Rainey, who returned to the head of the canal, built a cabin there in 1899, pre-empted the surrounding land and staked lode claims. A creek and a mountain in the area carry the Rainey name; the BC Geographical Names Office records Mount Rainey as named for Robert "Bob" Rainey, the first to locate a claim on the mountain.

The Stewart brothers arrived in 1902. In 1905, Robert Musket Stewart (1868–1954), the first postmaster, named the town Stewart. The brothers, John W. and Robert M. Stewart of Victoria, held interests in many of the area's mines. The Stewart post office opened on 1 May 1905, and in 1906 the brothers established the Stewart Land Company, which laid out the townsite.

=== Mining and the railway boom ===
Gold and silver mining dominated the early economy. Rainey's progress drew other prospectors, and 46 mining companies were soon active in the district.

The town's first boom followed a plan to build a railway inland from tidewater. The charter of the Portland Canal Short Line Railway was bought in 1910 by William Mackenzie and Donald Mann of the Canadian Northern Railway. Construction began that July, and by August 1911 the line ran 21 kilometres (13 mi) from a wharf on the tidal flats up the Bear River valley to the Red Cliff mine. Renamed the Canadian North Eastern Railway in 1911, it was promoted as the Pacific end of a line that would continue east through the Peace River country. Land prices rose sharply and the population reached about 10,000. The mines along the route did not develop as expected, the financing for an extension fell away, and regular trains stopped running in 1915; the rails were lifted for scrap in 1940–41. During the First World War the population fell to 17.

Nearby Hyder, Alaska, boomed with the discovery of rich silver veins in the upper Salmon River basin in 1917 and 1918. Hyder became an access and supply point for the mines, while Stewart served as the port for Canadian mining activity, which was centred on the town of Premier, which was accessed by a 14 miles (23 km) road from Hyder. The Premier mine attracted the backing of the Guggenheim brothers in 1919 and paid $22 million in dividends between 1921 and 1948. It produced about two million ounces of gold over 35 years. The success of the Premier revived the town, which was incorporated as a village on 16 May 1930.

Other mines in the area were the Jumbo, BC Silver, Red Cliff, and Porter-Idaho. The Big Missouri mine, in the same district, produced gold until 1942. More large camps were south of Stewart at Anyox and Maple Bay. At Anyox, on Observatory Inlet about 65 kilometres (40 mi) south of Stewart, the Granby company operated a copper mine and smelter from 1913 to 1935.

=== Later mining ===
The Granduc copper mine, about 40 kilometres (25 mi) northwest of Stewart, was developed in the 1960s, with ore moved through a 17-kilometre (11 mi) tunnel under the Coast Mountains, and closed in 1984. On 18 February 1965 an avalanche struck the mine's work camp and killed 26 men. CBC News has described it as the second-deadliest avalanche in Canadian history. A memorial to the victims stands in Stewart. Stewart was reincorporated as a district municipality on 27 June 1968.

The Scottie Gold mine operated north of Stewart from 1981 to 1985. Westmin Resources worked the Premier property as an open-pit gold and silver mine until low metal prices closed it in 1996. Ascot Resources later acquired the Premier and Big Missouri properties and poured gold from a refurbished Premier mill in April 2024, but suspended operations that September because underground development had not kept pace with the mill. The mine was placed on care and maintenance in mid-2025, and in February 2026 the company's new management said it intended to restart it.

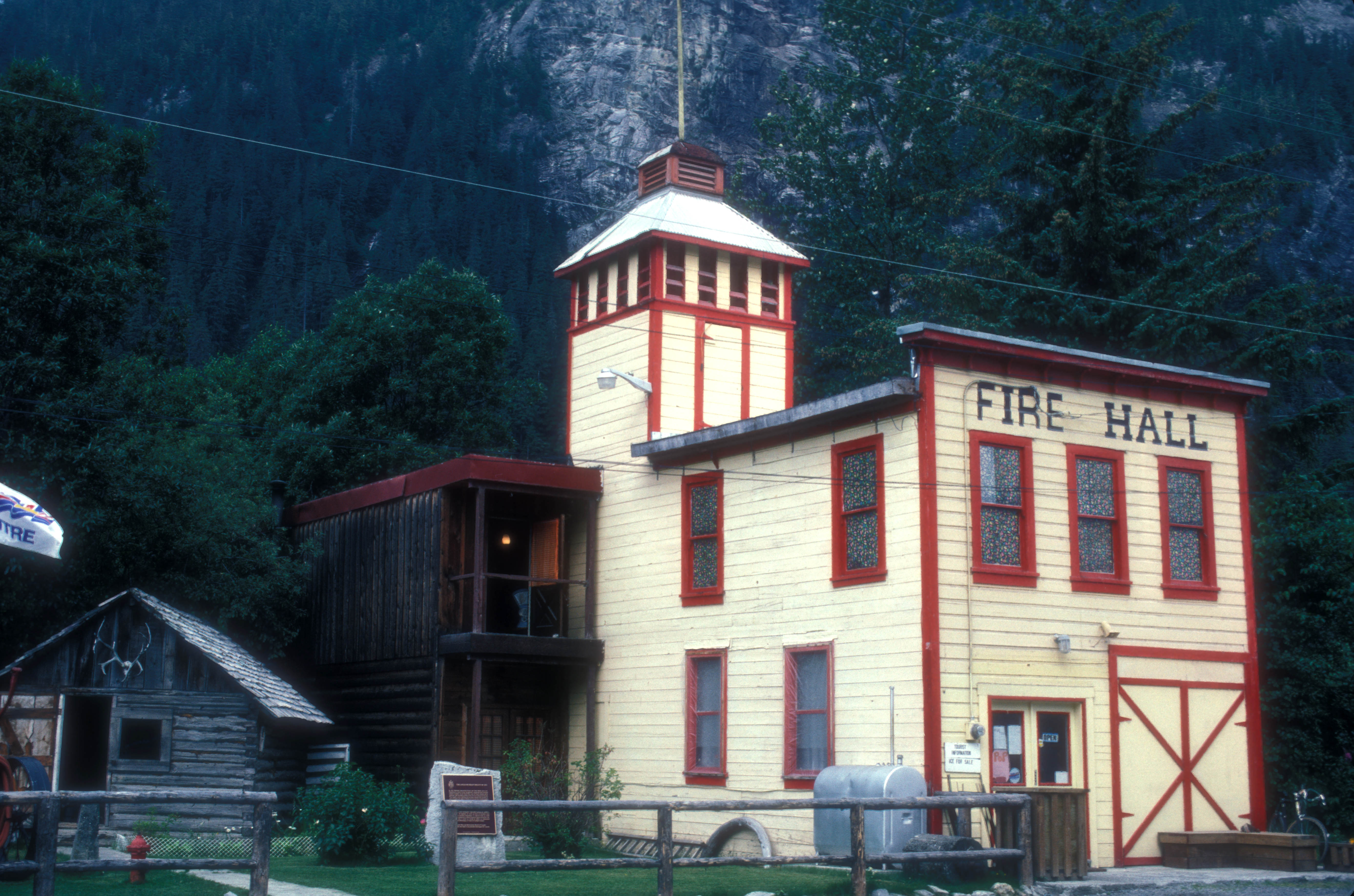
Fire hall in Stewart

== Economy ==
Stewart's economy has expanded and contracted with mineral markets since the 1920s, with logging and tourism providing support after the mine closures of the 1980s. The town is a gateway to the Golden Triangle, a mineral-rich region of northwestern British Columbia.

Stewart Bulk Terminals handles about 260,000 tonnes of copper and gold concentrate a year, roughly half its rated capacity, including concentrate from Newmont's Red Chris and Brucejack mines. In August 2025 the Nisga'a Nation, the Tahltan Nation Development Limited Partnership and Arrow Transportation Systems announced an agreement to buy the terminal as equal partners through Portland Canal Holdings Limited Partnership.

Stewart World Port, a wharf two kilometres south of the town, opened in September 2015 at a cost of $70 million. In 2019 it received $13.1 million from the federal National Trade Corridors Fund to increase its capacity for bulk exports.

== In film ==
Location filming for Bear Island took place at Stewart over seven weeks from November 1978. The exterior shots from John Carpenter's science fiction classic The Thing were filmed north of Stewart, near the Salmon Glacier, by a crew of about one hundred. Disney's Eight Below, starring Paul Walker and Jason Biggs, was partially filmed here. Leaving Normal (1992) was filmed in Stewart and Hyder, and Insomnia (2002) at Bear Glacier. The Stewart museum displays props from Bear Island and The Thing.

== Demographics ==
In the 2021 Census of Population conducted by Statistics Canada, Stewart had a population of 517 living in 256 of its 337 total private dwellings, a change of 28.9% from its 2016 population of 401. With a land area of 551.57 km^{2} (212.96 sq mi), it had a population density of 0.9/km^{2} (2.4/sq mi) in 2021.

== Transportation ==
Stewart is accessible by highway from the British Columbia highway system, via Highway 37A, by boat through the Portland Canal, or by air through Stewart Airport. Highway 37A passes Bear Glacier Provincial Park between Stewart and Meziadin Junction, where it meets Highway 37. From Hyder, a road continues up the Salmon River valley and back into British Columbia to the Premier and Granduc mine sites.

== Location ==
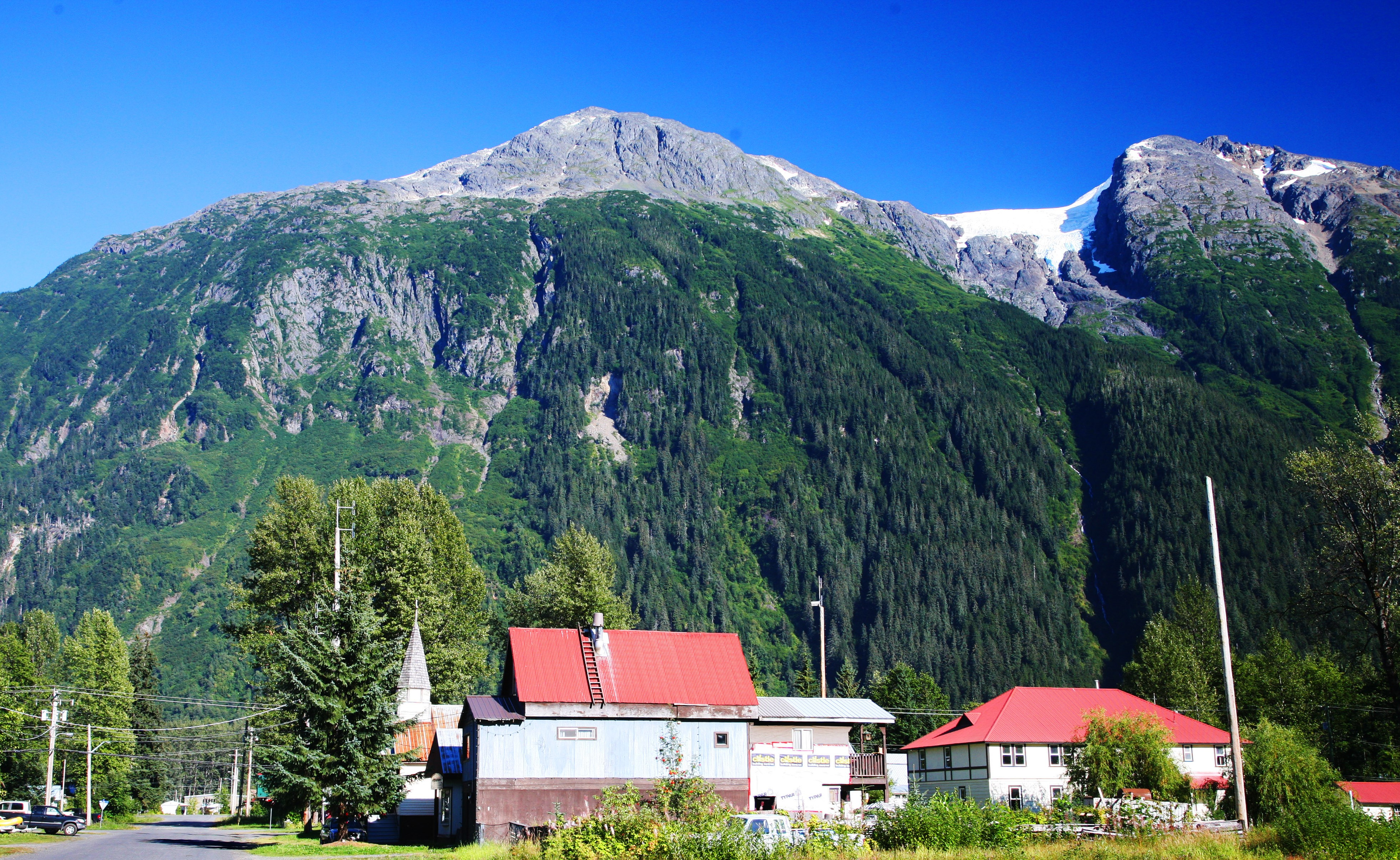
Mt. Rainey is southeast of Stewart

West of Stewart is Hyder, Alaska, which is only 3 kilometres (2 mi) from the town. Northwest of Stewart, and accessible only by way of Hyder, is Premier, British Columbia, notable for being in Canada, but accessible only through a portion of the United States that is accessible only from Canada.

East of the town is Meziadin Junction, which is 61 kilometres (38 mi) from the town. Also east is Kitwanga, British Columbia, which is located 218 kilometres (135 mi) from the town, and Dease Lake, British Columbia, which is located 392 kilometres (244 mi) north of Stewart. It is the northernmost point on Canada's Pacific coast.

== Climate ==
Stewart has a humid continental climate (Dfb), with about 1,866.8 mm (73.5 in) per year of precipitation, much of it as snow, and an average yearly temperature of 6.1 °C (43.0 °F), according to Environment Canada. Stewart is Canada's most northerly ice-free port. Due to its proximity to the ocean, the climate retains strong maritime influences, with winters being far milder than locations farther inland. With an average of 985 hours of annual sunshine, Stewart is one of the cloudiest places in the world.

Climate data for Stewart Airport Climate ID: 1067742; coordinates 55°56′10″N 129°59′06″W; elevation: 7.3 m (24 ft); 1981–2010 normals, extremes 1910–present
Month	Jan	Feb	Mar	Apr	May	Jun	Jul	Aug	Sep	Oct	Nov	Dec	Year
Record high humidex	9.4	10.4	15.2	25.3	30.1	38.9	39.0	37.5	28.3	21.2	10.5	9.9	39.0
Record high °C (°F)	13.3 (55.9)	11.7 (53.1)	17.1 (62.8)	25.5 (77.9)	31.7 (89.1)	35.0 (95.0)	33.4 (92.1)	32.7 (90.9)	30.6 (87.1)	20.6 (69.1)	14.4 (57.9)	11.2 (52.2)	35.0 (95.0)
Mean daily maximum °C (°F)	−0.5 (31.1)	2.3 (36.1)	5.8 (42.4)	11.0 (51.8)	15.8 (60.4)	18.9 (66.0)	19.8 (67.6)	18.8 (65.8)	14.7 (58.5)	8.9 (48.0)	2.7 (36.9)	0.1 (32.2)	9.9 (49.8)
Daily mean °C (°F)	−3.0 (26.6)	−1.1 (30.0)	1.9 (35.4)	6.1 (43.0)	10.7 (51.3)	13.9 (57.0)	15.1 (59.2)	14.3 (57.7)	11.1 (52.0)	6.3 (43.3)	0.6 (33.1)	−2.1 (28.2)	6.1 (43.0)
Mean daily minimum °C (°F)	−5.5 (22.1)	−4.5 (23.9)	−2.0 (28.4)	1.1 (34.0)	5.5 (41.9)	8.9 (48.0)	10.4 (50.7)	9.8 (49.6)	7.4 (45.3)	3.6 (38.5)	−1.7 (28.9)	−4.3 (24.3)	2.4 (36.3)
Record low °C (°F)	−30.0 (−22.0)	−28.3 (−18.9)	−23.3 (−9.9)	−13.9 (7.0)	−4.4 (24.1)	−2.8 (27.0)	0.0 (32.0)	−5.0 (23.0)	−3.9 (25.0)	−12.8 (9.0)	−24.8 (−12.6)	−26.1 (−15.0)	−30.0 (−22.0)
Record low wind chill	−30.1	−29.2	−25.7	−12.2	−1.3	0.0	0.0	0.0	−2.7	−13.0	−36.7	−32.5	−36.7
Average precipitation mm (inches)	238.0 (9.37)	137.0 (5.39)	121.8 (4.80)	89.1 (3.51)	72.3 (2.85)	65.6 (2.58)	73.0 (2.87)	122.4 (4.82)	217.3 (8.56)	278.0 (10.94)	230.1 (9.06)	222.2 (8.75)	1,866.8 (73.50)
Average rainfall mm (inches)	88.1 (3.47)	57.6 (2.27)	85.6 (3.37)	73.4 (2.89)	71.8 (2.83)	65.6 (2.58)	73.0 (2.87)	122.4 (4.82)	217.3 (8.56)	268.3 (10.56)	123.9 (4.88)	91.9 (3.62)	1,338.9 (52.71)
Average snowfall cm (inches)	162.8 (64.1)	85.6 (33.7)	38.8 (15.3)	15.8 (6.2)	0.5 (0.2)	0.0 (0.0)	0.0 (0.0)	0.1 (0.0)	0.0 (0.0)	9.7 (3.8)	112.7 (44.4)	144.3 (56.8)	570.2 (224.5)
Average precipitation days (≥ 0.2 mm)	20.0	15.1	18.2	16.6	16.1	15.4	16.4	17.4	20.2	23.3	21.4	20.5	220.5
Average rainy days (≥ 0.2 mm)	11.4	10.3	15.8	16.4	16.1	15.4	16.4	17.4	20.2	23.2	16.1	12.0	190.6
Average snowy days (≥ 0.2 cm)	14.3	9.2	7.2	2.5	0.08	0.0	0.0	0.04	0.0	1.7	10.8	14.7	60.6
Average relative humidity (%)	86.0	79.6	70.1	57.4	52.8	58.3	65.3	70.4	77.3	80.8	87.7	89.5	72.9
Mean monthly sunshine hours	25.7	40.0	73.5	119.8	157.7	145.0	138.1	126.5	85.2	39.9	19.7	14.4	985.4
Percentage possible sunshine	10.8	14.9	20.1	28.2	31.2	27.7	26.3	27.1	22.2	12.3	7.9	6.5	19.6
Source: Environment Canada wind chill

== See also ==
- Alaska boundary dispute
- Granduc Mine
- Hyder, Alaska
- List of francophone communities in British Columbia
