= List of mountains in Ethiopia =

This is a list of notable mountains in Ethiopia

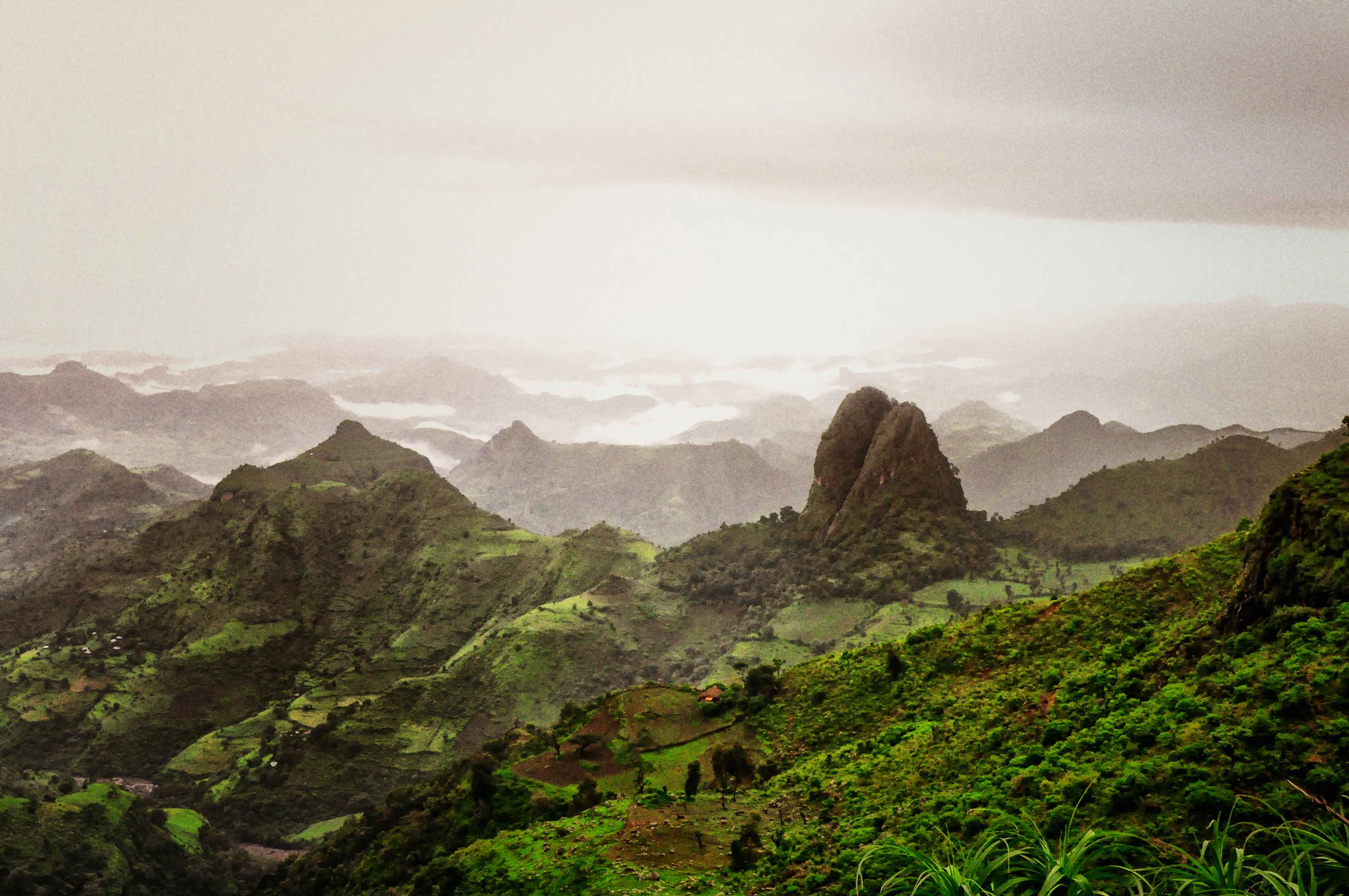
Simien Mountains Landscape, Ethiopia

== List ==
Mountain	Elevation	Prominence	Region	Range	Location
Ras Dashen (Note: Highest mountain in Ethiopia)	4,550 metres (14,930 ft)	3,997 metres (13,114 ft)	Amhara	Simien Mountains	13°14'12"N, 38°22'21"E
Mount Tullu Demtu	4,385 metres (14,386 ft)	2,512 metres (8,241 ft)	Oromia	Bale Mountains	
Mount Biuat	4,437 metres (14,557 ft)	800 metres (2,600 ft)	Amhara	Simien Mountains	13°14'38.0"N, 38°13'4.1"E
Mount Abuna Yosef	4,260 metres (13,980 ft)	1,909 metres (6,263 ft)	Amhara	Ethiopian Highlands	12°8'27"N, 39°10'54"E
Mount Abba Yared	4,409 metres (14,465 ft)	200 metres (660 ft)			
Mount Guna	4,120 metres (13,520 ft)	1,510 metres (4,950 ft)	Amhara		11°42'38.9"N, 38°14'12.1"E
Mount Chilalo	4,071 metres (13,356 ft)	610 metres (2,000 ft)	Oromia		7°55'N, 39°16'E
Mount Gugu	3,623 metres (11,886 ft)		Oromia		8°12'N, 39°58'E
Mount Choqa	4,100 metres (13,500 ft)	2,225 metres (7,300 ft)	Amhara		10°42'48"N, 37°50'54"E
Amba Alagi	3,438 metres (11,280 ft)		Tigray		12°59'N, 39°33'E
Mount Abuye Meda	4,012 metres (13,163 ft)		Amhara		
Mount Zuqualla	3,010 metres (9,880 ft)	1,150 metres (3,770 ft)	Oromia		8°33'N, 38°52'E
Mount Fentale	2,007 metres (6,585 ft)		Afar		8°58'0"N, 39°56'0"E
Mount Gara Muleta	3,346 metres (10,978 ft)	9 metres (30 ft)			9.253594°N 41.732174°E
Mount Entoto	3,200 metres (10,500 ft)		Oromia	Entoto Mountains	9°6'56"N, 38°46'20"E
Mount Yerer	3,099 metres (10,167 ft)	629 metres (2,064 ft)			
Mount Wochecha	3,391 metres (11,125 ft)	778 metres (2,552 ft)			
Mousa Ali	2,021 metres (6,631 ft)	1,607 metres (5,272 ft)			12°28'15"N, 42°24'18"E
Mount Damota	2,750 metres (9,020 ft)				6°54'12.9"N, 37°46'45.8"E
Abul Kasim (mountain)	2,573 metres (8,442 ft)	1,324 metres (4,344 ft)			7°31'N, 40°29'E
Ale Bagu	1,031 metres (3,383 ft)	1,031 metres (3,383 ft)			13°30'23"N, 40°37'54"E
Amba Aradam	2,756 metres (9,042 ft)				13°20'0"N, 39°31'0"E
Mount Asimba	3,176 metres (10,420 ft)	708 metres (2,323 ft)			
Mount Hazalo	2,145 metres (7,037 ft)				10°4'56"N, 40°42'6"E
Mount Batu	4,037 metres (13,245 ft)				6°50'0"N, 39°49'0"E
Borale Ale	668 metres (2,192 ft)				13°43'30"N, 40°36'0"E
Borawli	812 metres (2,664 ft)				13°18'14"N, 40°59'11"E
Debre Damo	2,216 metres (7,270 ft)				
Mount Dendi	3,260 metres (10,700 ft)				8°50'34"N, 38°0'41"E
Amba Ferit	4,270 metres (14,010 ft)	1,919 metres (6,296 ft)			13°14'38.0"N, 38°13'4.1"E
Mount Furi	2,839 metres (9,314 ft)				
Gada Ale	287 metres (942 ft)				13°58'30"N, 40°24'30"E
Mount Goroch'an	3,142 metres (10,308 ft)	749 metres (2,457 ft)			
Amba Geshen					11°29'55"N, 39°19'6"E
Mount Gurage	3,900 metres (12,800 ft)				8°16'59.99"N, 38°22'59.88"E
Mount Hai	4,137 metres (13,573 ft)				
Hayli Gubbi	493 metres (1,617 ft)				13°30'0"N, 40°43'12"E
Mount Chilalo	4,071 metres (13,356 ft)	610 metres (2,000 ft)			7°55'N, 39°16'E
Kulibi	2,130 metres (6,990 ft)				
Kundudo	2,965 metres (9,728 ft)				9°26'0"N, 42°20'0"E
Mount Maigudo	3,359 metres (11,020 ft)	1,589 metres (5,213 ft)			7°28'N, 37°12'E
Mount Megezez	3,457 metres (11,342 ft)				
Mount Meseraia	4,419 metres (14,498 ft)				
Mount Smith	2,560 metres (8,400 ft)	1,684 metres (5,525 ft)			6°14'3.12"N, 36°17'57.12"E
Mount Suluta	2,796 metres (9,173 ft)	69 metres (226 ft)			
Tat Ali	655 metres (2,149 ft)				
Wehni					12°8'54"N, 37°45'59"E
Mount Welel	3,301 metres (10,830 ft)	1,720 metres (5,640 ft)			8°52'39"N, 34°48'42"E
Mount Wenchi	3,450 metres (11,320 ft)				8°48'N, 37°54'E

== See also ==
- Amba (geology)
- List of volcanoes in Ethiopia
- List of highest mountain peaks of Africa, with data on the 47 highest mountains of Ethiopia
