= Exile Hill =

Hill in British Columbia, Canada

- Exile Peak
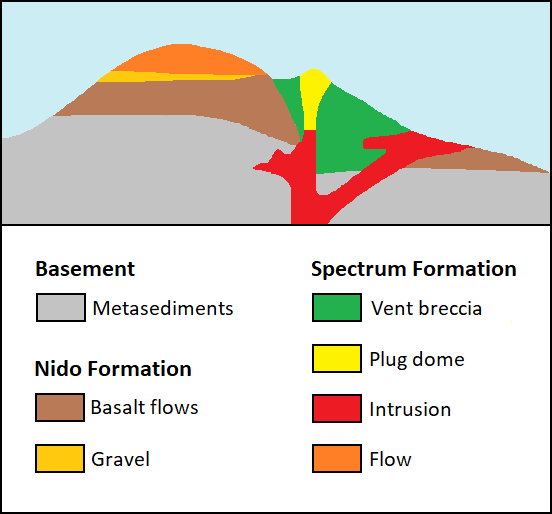
- Geological cross section of Exile Hill

Highest point
- Elevation: 1,890 m (6,200 ft)
- Coordinates: 57°22′41″N 130°49′29″W

Geography
- Location within British Columbia
- Location in Mount Edziza Provincial Park
- Country: Canada
- Province: British Columbia
- District: Cassiar Land District
- Protected area: Mount Edziza Provincial Park
- Parent range: Tahltan Highland
- Topo map: NTS 104G7 Mess Lake

Geology
- Formed by: Volcanism
- Mountain type(s): Cinder cone, plug dome
- Rock type(s): Basalt, trachyte
- Last eruption: Pliocene age

Exile Hill, sometimes referred to as Exile Peak, is an isolated hill in Cassiar Land District of northwestern British Columbia, Canada. It has an elevation of 1,890 metres (6,200 feet) and is part of the Arctic Lake Plateau or the neighbouring Spectrum Range, which are within the limits of the Tahltan Highland. Exile Hill is about 60 kilometres (37 miles) southeast of the community of Telegraph Creek in Mount Edziza Provincial Park. Access to Exile Hill is via aircraft, which are permitted to land on Mess Lake and Little Arctic Lake to the northwest and southeast, respectively.

Exile Hill is part of the Mount Edziza volcanic complex, which consists of diverse landforms such as shield volcanoes, stratovolcanoes, lava domes and cinder cones. The volcanic rocks composing the hill are of Pliocene age and are subdivided into two geological formations that were deposited during the second magmatic cycle of the Mount Edziza volcanic complex. Basalt composes the Nido Formation whereas the younger Spectrum Formation consists of trachyte. Nearby volcanic features include Outcast Hill, Tadekho Hill, Kuno Peak, Nahta Cone and Wetalth Ridge.

== Name and etymology ==
The name of the hill became official on January 2, 1980, and was adopted on the National Topographic System map 104G/15 after being submitted to the BC Geographical Names office by the Geological Survey of Canada. Exile is a reference to the Wetalth, a group of seven people previously living in the area who were outcast or exiled from the Tahltans. Nahta Cone, Outcast Hill and Wetalth Ridge are extensions of the Wetalth theme. Canadian volcanologist Jack Souther labelled Exile Hill as Exile Peak on a geological map in his 1992 report, The Late Cenozoic Mount Edziza Volcanic Complex, British Columbia.

== Geography ==
Exile Hill is located about 60 km (37 mi) southeast of the community of Telegraph Creek in Cassiar Land District of northwestern British Columbia, Canada. It has an elevation of 1,890 m (6,200 ft) and is part of the Arctic Lake Plateau or the neighbouring Spectrum Range, which are at the southern end of the Mount Edziza volcanic complex. The volcanic complex consists of a group of overlapping shield volcanoes, stratovolcanoes, lava domes and cinder cones that have formed over the last 7.5 million years. Exile Hill rises above the southeastern side of Mess Creek valley and is topographically higher than its surroundings. The terrain east of Exile Hill is relatively flat, but elsewhere it is surrounded by vegetated valleys. Tadekho Creek and Nahta Creek flow through valleys north and south of Exile Hill, respectively, and are tributaries of Mess Creek.

Exile Hill is surrounded by a number of other landforms within the Mount Edziza volcanic complex. Outcast Hill, about 5 km (3.1 mi) to the northeast, is a cinder cone on an interfluve between Tadekho Creek to the south and an unnamed tributary of Tadekho Creek to the north. About 5 km (3.1 mi) southeast of Exile Hill is Tadekho Hill, a nearly circular volcanic cone about 5 km (3.1 mi) northwest of Little Arctic Lake. Kuno Peak, about 10 km (6.2 mi) to the east, is a glaciated mountain peak at the western end of a ridge extending from the southwestern end of the Spectrum Range. About 10 km (6.2 mi) south and southeast of Exile Hill are Nahta Cone and Wetalth Ridge, respectively, which are on the opposite side of Nahta Creek valley.

Exile Hill lies in Mount Edziza Provincial Park which, with an area of 2,661.8 km^{2} (1,027.7 mi^{2}), is one of the largest provincial parks in British Columbia. It was established in 1972 to preserve the volcanic landscape extending from Mount Edziza in the north to the Spectrum Range in the south. Mount Edziza Provincial Park is in the Tahltan Highland, a southeast-trending upland area extending along the western side of the Stikine Plateau.

== Geology ==
=== Background ===
As a part of the Mount Edziza volcanic complex, Exile Hill lies within a broad area of volcanoes called the Northern Cordilleran Volcanic Province, which extends from northwestern British Columbia northwards through Yukon into easternmost Alaska. The dominant rocks that make up these volcanoes are alkali basalts and hawaiites, but nephelinites, basanites and peralkaline (Note: Peralkaline rocks are magmatic rocks that have a higher ratio of sodium and potassium to aluminum.) phonolites, trachytes and comendites are locally abundant. These rocks were deposited by volcanic eruptions from 20 million years ago to as recently as a few hundred years ago. Volcanism in the Northern Cordilleran Volcanic Province is thought to be due to rifting of the North American Cordillera, driven by changes in relative plate motion between the North American and Pacific plates.

=== Stratigraphy ===
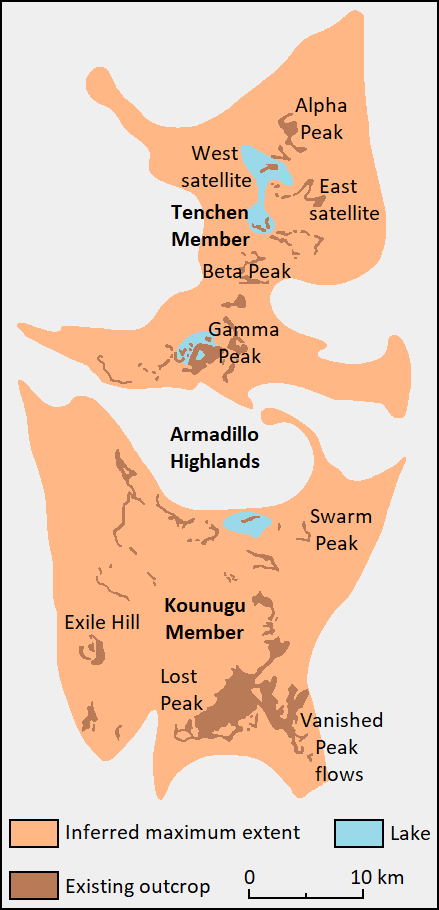
Paleogeological map of the Nido Formation showing the location of Exile Hill at the end of Nido time

Exile Hill consists of Pliocene volcanic rocks that compose two geological formations, both of which were deposited by volcanic eruptions during the second magmatic cycle of the Mount Edziza volcanic complex. The oldest geological formation, the 4.4-million-year-old Nido Formation, is subdivided into two geological members; the Kounugu Member is the main geological member at Exile Hill. Alkali basalt, hawaiite and picrite are the main rocks composing the Kounugu Member, which erupted from at least four separate eruptive centres: Swarm Peak, Vanished Peak, Lost Peak and Exile Hill. The youngest geological formation, the 3.1-million-year-old Spectrum Formation, consists mostly of comendite, pantellerite and pantelleritic trachyte that erupted from the Spectrum Dome and much smaller satellitic centres such as Exile Hill. Exile Hill is the only eruptive centre of the Mount Edziza volcanic complex known to have been active during both the Nido and Spectrum eruptive periods, but the amount of lava erupted from it remains unknown.

==== Nido Formation ====
The formation of Exile Hill began with the eruption of a small cinder cone on the extreme western edge of the surrounding plateau. This cone was almost completely inundated by younger lava flows from the south and east, but thick deposits of bombs and agglutinated spatter exposed on the southeastern flank of Exile Hill are probably remnants of this early cone. A series of basaltic lava flows up to 180 m (590 ft) thick, believed to have originated from a vent adjacent to Exile Hill, are exposed in isolated buttes and in cliffs along the upper Mess Creek valley.

Basaltic lava flows of Exile Hill are geomorphologically and compositionally more diverse than those from the Swarm Peak and Vanished Peak eruptive centres. The lowermost basaltic lava flow forming the base of Exile Hill is more than 30 m (98 ft) thick whereas the uppermost rubbly basaltic lava flows are only a few metres in thickness. Characterizing the lowermost basaltic lava flows are long, curving columns that occur in sheath-like clusters. In contrast, the upper basaltic lava flows contain random, blocky columnar jointing or stout, spheroidally weathered columns.

Exile Hill basalt is overlain by a thick layer of gravel that consists mainly of pebbles and cobblestones. The pebbles and cobblestones consist of rhyolite and obsidian, which probably originated from the Spectrum Dome to the east. Jack Souther mapped the gravel as part of the Nido Formation in 1992.

==== Spectrum Formation ====
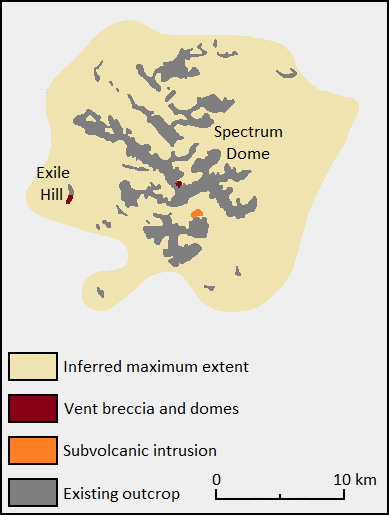
Paleogeological map of the Spectrum Formation showing the location of Exile Hill at the end of the Spectrum eruptive period

The western side of Exile Hill contains a small plug dome of Spectrum Formation trachyte about 100 m (330 ft) high that was formed during at least three separate lava eruptions. This 213 m (699 ft) wide dome contains prominent vertical flow layering and is surrounded by breccia that protrudes through the Nido Formation basalt. The breccia was deposited by an explosive eruption and consists of immensely altered, rusty trachyte clasts (Note: Clasts are grains or fragments of rock broken off other rocks by physical weathering.) in a yellowish-brown groundmass of much smaller breccia particles. Yeda Peak about 8 km (5.0 mi) east of Exile Hill was the site of a similar but much larger eruption near the end of the Spectrum eruptive period.

A roughly 100 m (330 ft) thick series of trachyte lava flows caps the summit of Exile Hill and overlies the thick layer of gravel capping the Nido Formation basalt. The trachyte is fine grained, pantelleritic in composition and contains 1–2 mm (0.039–0.079 in) wide phenocrysts of feldspar. Interlayering these lava flows are beds of pyroclastic material containing bombs, spatter and light-coloured trachyte blocks that have been fused together.

Exposed on the southwestern side of Exile Hill is a small porous green trachyte intrusion underlying the breccia. It is irregular in mass and contains subhorizontal flow layering, suggesting that this subvolcanic intrusion most likely formed when trachytic magma moved laterally from the dome conduit and crystallized into the surrounding Nido Formation basalt.

=== Basement ===
Exile Hill is underlain by metasedimentary rocks of the Stikinia terrane, a Paleozoic and Mesozoic suite of volcanic and sedimentary rocks that accreted (Note: Accretion is the process by which terranes are added to a continent, resulting in continental growth.) to the continental margin of North America during the Jurassic. Most of these rocks around the base of Exile Hill are covered with felsenmeer, till, glacial outwash, fluvial outwash or solifluction deposits. The northwestern side of Exile Hill contains active talus cones whereas the southwestern and northeastern sides of the hill contain landslide deposits which extend onto the basement rocks.

== Accessibility ==
Alpine Lakes Air and BC Yukon Air are the only air charter companies permitted to provide access to this area via aircraft. Private aircraft are also permitted to land in the area, but a letter of authorization from the BC Parks Stikine Senior Park Ranger is required to land on Mess Lake and Little Arctic Lake, which are the closest lakes of significant size to Exile Hill. These two lakes are about 10 and 7 km (6.2 and 4.3 mi) northwest and southeast of Exile Hill, respectively.

== See also ==
- List of Northern Cordilleran volcanoes
- List of volcanoes in Canada
- List of cinder cones
- List of lava domes
