= Kuno Peak =

Mountain in British Columbia, Canada

- Location within British Columbia
- Interactive map of Kuno Peak

Highest point
- Elevation: 2,183 m (7,162 ft)
- Coordinates: 57°22′31″N 130°44′26″W

Geography
- Country: Canada
- Province: British Columbia
- District: Cassiar Land District
- Parent range: Spectrum Range
- Topo map: NTS 104G7 Mess Lake

Geology
- Rock age: Pliocene age
- Last eruption: Unknown

Kuno Peak is a mountain peak in the Spectrum Range at the southern end of the Mount Edziza volcanic complex in northwestern British Columbia, Canada. It is south of Yagi Ridge, west of Yeda Peak, southeast of Outcast Hill, east of Exile Hill, northeast of Tadekho Hill and north of Little Arctic Lake, the latter four of which are on the northern end of the Arctic Lake Plateau. It has an elevation of 2,183 metres (7,162 feet) and lies at the southwestern end of the Spectrum Range. Tadekho Creek originates from the southern flank of the ridge connecting Kuno Peak with Yeda Peak.

Kuno Peak is at the south end of Mount Edziza Provincial Park which is southeast of the community of Telegraph Creek. It is named after Hisashi Kuno, a Japanese volcanologist and teacher who visited the area with Canadian volcanologist Jack Souther in 1966. The name of the peak became official on January 2, 1980, after being submitted to the BC Geographical Names office by the Geological Survey of Canada.

== Geology ==
Kuno Peak is formed mainly of Pliocene volcanic rocks of the Spectrum Formation which consists of comendite, pantellerite and pantelleritic trachyte. These rocks are in the form of lava flows as well as minor breccia and ash flow deposits. The Spectrum Formation is the eroded remains of a large lava dome that forms the current pyramidal peaks and ridges of the Spectrum Range. The southwestern flank of Kuno Peak contains the remains of a Big Raven Formation cinder cone that was subsequently destroyed by landsliding on the peak. This basaltic Holocene cinder cone was the source of a lava flow but it was later buried under debris from the landsliding.

== See also ==
- Volcanism of the Mount Edziza volcanic complex
