= Tadekho =

Tadekho can refer to:

- Tadekho Creek, a stream in British Columbia, Canada
- Tadekho Hill, a hill in British Columbia, Canada
