= Mount Hazalo =

Mountain in Ethiopia

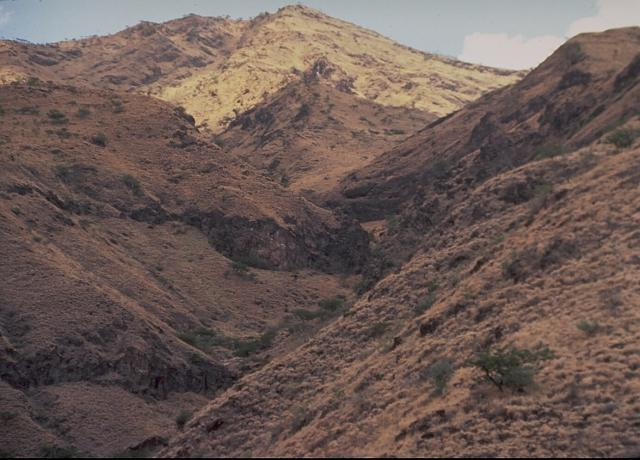
- Mount Ayalu

Highest point
- Elevation: 2,145 m (7,037 ft)
- Listing: Mountains of Ethiopia
- Coordinates: 10°04′55″N 40°42′07″E

Geography
- Location within Ethiopia
- Location: Afar Region Ethiopia

Geology
- Mountain type: Stratovolcano
- Volcanic zone: East African Rift

Mount Hazalo, also known as Azalo, or Ayelu is an isolated, rhyolitic stratovolcano in eastern Ethiopia. Located in the Afar Region, near the South of the towns of Āfdem and Gewane, and has an altitude of 2,145 metres (7,037 ft).

The district is today inhabited by the Afar people however in the past also by the Doba, Warjih and Harari people. The Battle of Hazalo took place between the Adal Sultanate and Oromo of Gada Michelle in the 16th century.

The Afar people have a tradition that, they travelled to this mountain where they settled for a number of years. Here they prospered until their wealth led them to hold weddings and feasts during Ramadan; for this Allah is said to have sent a famine and plagues on them. After this, the people moved to Ifat during its earlier period.

Wilfred Thesiger describes his ascent of Mount Ayalu in 1933. He notes that this mountain was the object of an annual pilgrimage by members of the Afar people, who travelled from as far away as Daoe in order to climb to the summit where they would pray for good health and success in war. They would also make a pilgrimage to Ayalu in other times of the year to pray for relief in times of famine and after a defeat in war. When David Buxton visited the site a little more than 10 years later, he was unable to learn if sacrifices were still made there.

The volcano is one of the largest in Ethiopia and is located, along with its close neighbor Adwa, in a major right step of the linear chain of volcanoes and fissures along the middle of the East African Rift. Due to the location of the volcano little is known about its past and present behavior. However, an earthquake and InSAR study conducted by Derek Keir and colleagues shows that a magma intrusion around 5 km (3 mi) deep and 8 km (5 mi) long emanated away from the volcano and intruded near the eastern side of neighboring Adwa in May 2000.

== See also ==
- List of volcanoes in Ethiopia
- List of stratovolcanoes
