= Azas Plateau =

Volcanic field in Russia

- East Tuva Plateau, Khamsara-Biykhem Plateau, Northeast Tuva Plateau
- Location within Russia

Highest point
- Coordinates: 52°25′59″N 98°18′11″E

Geology
- Rock age: Pliocene-Holocene
- Mountain type: Volcanic field
- Volcanic belt: Baikal Rift Zone

Azas Plateau is a volcanic field in Russia. It is also known as East Tuva Plateau, Khamsara-Biykhem Plateau and Northeast Tuva Plateau. It covers a surface area of 2,000 square kilometres (770 sq mi) west of Lake Baikal. Volcanic activity in the area also occurred at the Oka Plateau and the Jom-Bolok volcanic field.

The field is formed by a late Pliocene lava plateau. Several volcanoes formed under the influence of ice and are constructed by lava flows and hyaloclastite, these are so-called tuyas which form by eruptions of volcanoes into ice. Ice meltwater floods may have accompanied this activity. The youngest dated volcanic centre was active 48,000 ± 20,000 years ago, but some lava flows may be even younger.

== Geography ==
The field is located in southern Siberia, between the East Sayan Mountains and the Todzha basin. There it covers a surface area of 2,000 square kilometres (770 sq mi) west of Lake Baikal, at an altitude of 2,000 metres (6,600 ft). Volcanic landforms include cones, lava fields, tuyas, and other volcanic structures including scoria cones, volcanic dykes, volcanic necks and volcanic vents. Other landforms are cirques and U-shaped valleys left by previous glaciations. The Bii Khem river, a tributary of the Yenisei River, crosses the field. The field lies within the Tuva Republic of Russia in a remote area where access is difficult. The volcanoes were first described between 1850 and 1900.

== Geological context ==
It is part of the Tuva volcanic province of the Baikal Rift Zone, which is linked to a hotspot that has raised the terrain as high as 3,000 metres (9,800 ft). Activity in the rift zone started in the Oligocene and reached its maximum during the Miocene. Together with the Oka Plateau, the Azas Plateau forms the East Sayan province of the Baikal Rift Zone. Activity in the Azas Plateau has been influenced by a tectonic graben in the area. The Azas Plateau is the largest lava field in the Tuva volcanic province. The Jom-Bolok volcanic field may be related to the Azas Plateau.

== Geomorphology ==
A large lava field with thicknesses of c. 250 metres (820 ft) formed during the Late Pliocene, when the largest eruptions took place. These flows reached a thickness of approximately 250 metres (820 ft). Nine volcanoes bearing evidence of having formed beneath ice are found in the southeastern part of the field. Volcanoes on the plateau are about 400–600 metres (1,300–2,000 ft) high and have the form of tables. Ash cones formed on the individual edifices. The lava flows on the table-shaped volcanoes also display rounded hollows. Many volcanoes appear to be part of a lineament. Volcanism may be influenced by strike-slip faults associated with the Jom-Bolok fault.

Individual volcanoes in the Azas Plateau volcanic field include the Derbi-Taiga tuya (52°22′15″N 98°14′8″E), which is formed by several layers of hyaloclastite and lava flows and displays a prominent "winged" topography. The hyaloclastite layers were formerly considered to be tuffs and reach thicknesses of 8 metres (26 ft). Pillow lavas also exist. A system of ancient valleys formed by floods are found near to Derbi-Taiga. Ulug-Arginskii (52°23′18″N 98°23′7″E) is a cone that formed exposed in the air. The cone is accompanied by a maar with a lake to the south, and a lava flow from the cone reached 10 kilometres (6.2 mi) in length. Shivit-Taiga with a length of over 10 kilometres (6.2 mi) and a height of 500 metres (1,600 ft) is among the biggest volcanoes in the world that formed beneath ice, but Derby-Taiga may be even larger depending on how the size is measured. Shivit-Taiga covers a surface of 100 square kilometres (39 sq mi) and is 500 metres (1,600 ft) high. This edifice is a stratovolcano and it features two craters with diameters of 250 metres (820 ft) and 100 metres (330 ft). Lava lakes formed in two craters on the volcano. Shivit-Taiga too is accompanied by a topography that indicates that ancient floods passed there. Kokhemskii is 2,648 metres (8,688 ft) and was affected by glacial erosion. Sorug-Chushku-Uzu 1 kilometre (0.62 mi) north of Shivit-Taiga is 2,525 metres (8,284 ft) high.

Some volcanoes have been affected by landsliding, gully formation and glaciation after their formation. Likewise, the field has been affected by erosion, forming deep valleys with glacier deposits.

== Effects of glaciation ==
The Azas Plateau was affected by an ice sheet which formed on the East Sayan mountains during the Pleistocene. When volcanoes erupt into ice, the ice melts and volcanic structures named tuyas can form in meltwater lakes. Runny lavas can form such edifices, which tend to have steep slopes, only when trapped within ice. During tuya activity, the subaqueous activity forms hyaloclastite and when the activity occurs in the air lava flows are formed, including lava deltas. Some of the tuyas in the Azas Plateau may have formed through complex eruptive processes. Based on the tuyas of the Tuvan field, it has been determined that ice thicknesses in the area exceeded 700 metres (2,300 ft) and that at least three different ice ages occurred in the field. The tuyas in the Azas plateau have been compared to volcanic edifices in the Valles Marineris on Mars. Non-tuya volcanic ice interaction landforms are also found, such as Albine-Bondok, Charash-Dag and Sagan which are subglacial mounds. Glaciation was already in progress under marine isotope stage 5 (127,000 - 71,000 years ago) and by the stage 4 (71,000 - 57,000 years ago) it was continuous over the Azas Plateau. Glacier retreat was underway by the isotope stage 3 (57,000 - 24,000 years ago), when some volcanoes formed in the air.

== Composition ==
Volcanism is overall basaltic, volcanic rocks erupted by the Azas Plateau include basalt and trachybasalt. Other volcanoes in the Baikal Rift Zone have erupted the same rocks. These rocks are alkaline and their texture is aphyric. Minerals contained in the rocks include augite, clinopyroxene, olivine, plagioclase, titanium-containing magnetite and nepheline in the more alkaline rocks. The total volume of volcanic rocks is about 600 cubic kilometres (140 cu mi). Hematite is present in the rocks and gives many tuyas a red colour. Based on geochemistry, the magma formed at depths of 80 kilometres (50 mi). Volcaniclastic rocks were originally considered to be tuffs. Cumulates and xenoliths from the mantle have been found at some volcanoes.

== Chronology ==
Volcanic activity in the Azas Plateau commenced during the Late Pliocene. Activity continued into the Holocene. Before volcanism of the Azas Plateau started, volcanism occurred in the Oka plateau. The Azas trough formed in the Miocene-Pliocene.

The first volcanic activity beginning 2 million years ago formed voluminous lava flows from fissure vents. Later the activity focused on deep-seated lineaments. Volcanic activity between 1.65 - 1.75 mya occurred beneath ice in the ancient valleys of the Bii Khem river. In the middle-late Pleistocene volcanism occurred in the southeastern parts of the field. Some dates obtained on edifices in the Azas Plateau are 725,000 ± 50,000 - 760,000 ± 50,000 years for Derbi-Taiga, 600,000 - 560,000 years for Kadyr-Sugskii, 600,000 - 290,000 for some volcanoes surrounding Derbi-Taiga, 350,000 - 290,000 for Yurdawa between Derbi-Taiga and Shivit-Taiga, 225,000 ± 50,000 for Ploskii, 150,000 ± 50,000 for Kokhemskii, 130,000 ± 40,000 - 110,000 ± 000 for Shivit-Taiga, 75,000 ± 40,000 for Priozernyi, 60,000 ± 40,000 for Sorug-Chushku-Uzu and 48,000 ± 20,000 for Ulug-Arginskii. Some lava flows in the Bii-Khem valley are even younger than the Ulug-Arginskii volcano. It is possible that when eruptions in the Azas Plateau occurred beneath ice, they caused floods of glacial meltwater called Jokulhlaup; corresponding landforms have been found at Derbi-Taiga and Shivit-Taiga volcanoes.
