= Jom-Bolok volcanic field =

Volcanic field in Russia

Jom-Bolok
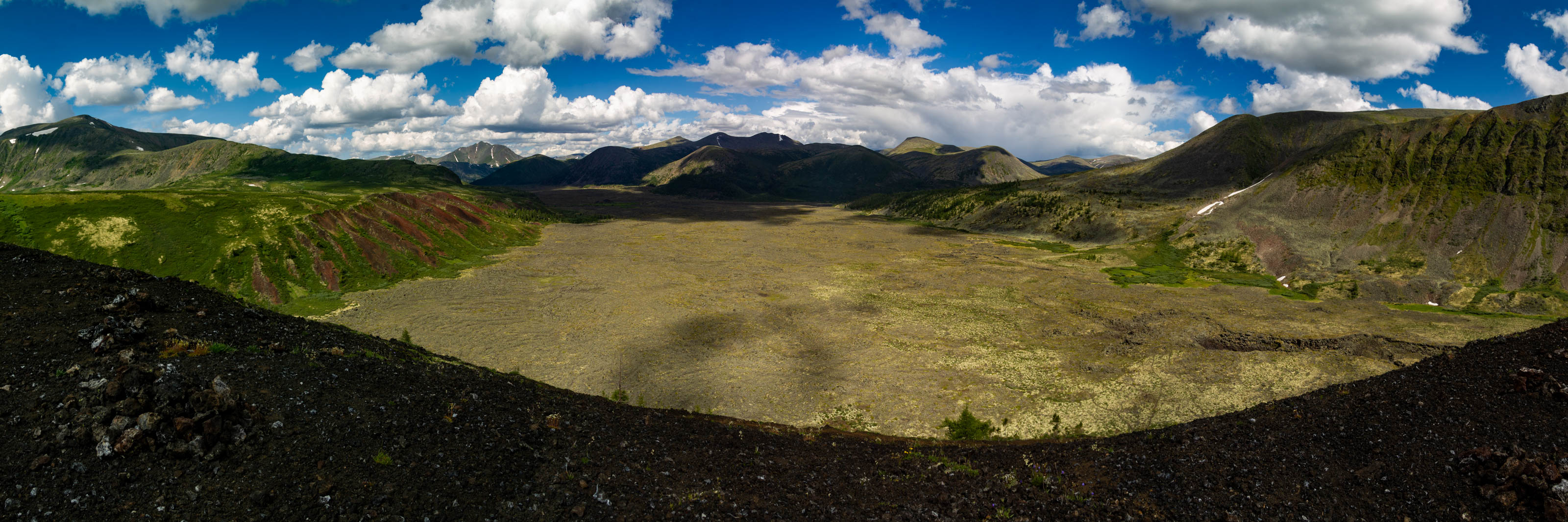

Highest point
- Coordinates: 52°42′0″N 98°58′48″E

Geography
- Location within Russia

Geology
- Rock age: Pleistocene-Holocene
- Last eruption: 682–779 CE

Jom-Bolok, also known as Volcano Valley and East Sayan Volcanic Field, is a volcanic field in Russia, 200 kilometres (120 mi) west of Lake Baikal. It is part of the Baikal rift zone which is also responsible for volcanism elsewhere around Lake Baikal. The volcanic activity has generated long lava flows and cinder cones. One of the lava flows is 70 kilometres (43 mi) long and has a volume of 7.9 cubic kilometres (1.9 cu mi).

Volcanic activity in the field commenced during the late Pleistocene in an area that had been previously influenced by glaciers and with even earlier volcanic and tectonic activity. Magma probably formed during deglaciation was erupted during the early Holocene, generating the long lava flow. A much more recent eruption in the southern part of the field may be referenced in Mongolian chronicles.

== Geologic context ==
The Jom-Bolok volcanic field lies in the over 3,100 metres (10,200 ft) high East Sayan Mountains and is far removed from the major plate boundaries around Asia. It may be under the influence of the subducting Pacific Plate regardless, as well as of the India-Asia collision, but more likely volcanism there is a consequence of a mantle plume and there are seismic velocity anomalies in the mantle under Jom-Bolok. Other volcanic fields within 1,000 kilometres (620 mi) of Jom-Bolok are the Hangai, Khamar-Daban, Oka, Tuva and Vitim fields. These volcanic fields extend into Mongolia.

Like the Udokan plateau, Jom-Bolok is a volcanic field part of the Baikal rift which has been volcanically active during the Holocene. Volcanism there may be the consequence either of passive rifting or mantle plume activity and has been ongoing since the Mesozoic. The basement of this area was heavily folded and altered during the Tertiary, which was also affected by river incision and earlier eruptive activity. During the late Pleistocene, 300–400 metres (980–1,310 ft) thick glaciers formed in the Jom-Bolok valley and other adjacent valleys.

== Geology ==
The field contains scoria cones, lava flows and small cinder cones. Pyroclastic cones in the field include Atkinson, Kropotkin (2,077 metres (6,814 ft) and 52°42′0″N 98°59′0″E), Medvedev, Ostanets Group ("remnants" in Russian), Peretolchin (2,050 metres (6,730 ft) and 52°43′0″N 98°58′0″E), Pertolichina (2,050 metres (6,730 ft) and 52°43′0″N 98°58′0″E), Pogranichniy ("border" in Russian, being located between two other flows), Stariy ("old" in Russian, 2,030 metres (6,660 ft) and 52°36′0″N 98°54′0″E), Treshina ("fissure" in Russian) and Troynoy ("triplet" in Russian, three 10 metres (33 ft) high domes). Most of these cones are located within the Hee-Gol valley rather than the Jom-Bolok valley itself. These cones are constructed on top of three different faults.

An alkali basalt lava flow erupted during the Holocene has a volume of 7.9 cubic kilometres (1.9 cu mi) and reached a length of 70 kilometres (43 mi) along Jom-Bolok river, reaching the Oka river in a large fan and damming it. This volume is comparable to the volume of lavas emitted during the 1973 Tolbachik eruption, albeit smaller than the Eldgja and Laki eruptions. This volume is unusual for a volcanic field of this size. This large eruptive volume may be linked to the effects of the ending ice age; the melting of the glaciers and resulting unloading of the crust would have resulted in a pre-existing subcrustal pond of magma to drain in a high volume eruption. The extreme length of the flow was likely also helped by the formation of lava tubes within the flow. The northern lava flow during its formation displayed some excellent thermal insulation, and it propagated by a process named sheet inflation where lava flows form thin sheets that subsequently grow to larger flows with a solid crust.

The Kropotkin and Peretolchin cones are the largest ones and grew to heights of 100 metres (330 ft) above lava flows, Atkinson cone later formed on Peretolchin's side but is heavily degraded. The Atkinson cone was probably formed during at least two separate stages, as did the Stariy cone which was destroyed during the early phase of activity and subsequently grew a secondary cone.

A shorter, 6 kilometres (3.7 mi) long lava flow forms the southern lava field, within the upper Kadyr-Os and Khi-Gol valleys. This field with a volume of 0.2 cubic kilometres (0.048 cu mi) is comparable to some large Hawaiian lava flows such as the 1950 Mauna Loa lava flow. The Medvedev mound is associated with its own lava flow and peculiar lava features named "stony-flowers". This flow has a much smaller volume of 0.00007 cubic kilometres (1.7×10^{−5} cu mi), covering a surface of 0.03 square kilometres (0.012 sq mi). The youngest lavas were erupted in the upper Khi-Gol valley from the Oka-Jombolok convergence where it assumes an aa morphology. That they don't appear in the intervening region may be because it was channeled through older lava tubes beneath the older lava flows. Lava flows from Jom-Bolok formed a lava dam that generated Lake Khara-Nur about 6,400 years ago.

All the lavas at Jom-Bolok are hawaiites and comparable to the close but older Oka and Tuva field lavas; the total volume of volcanic rocks is about 16 cubic kilometres (3.8 cu mi). Other fields around the Baikal rift have also hawaiites but are also associated with other volcanic rocks.

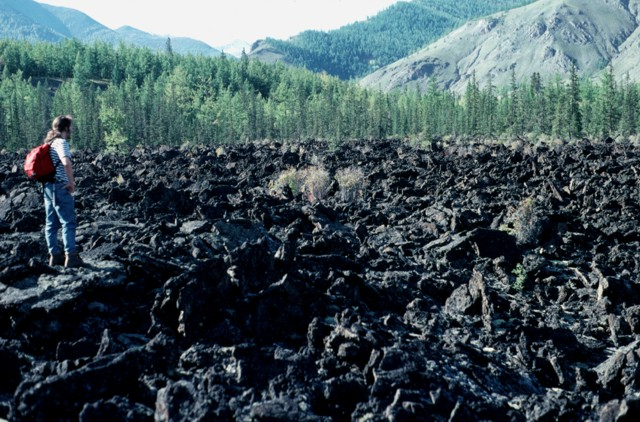
A lava flow

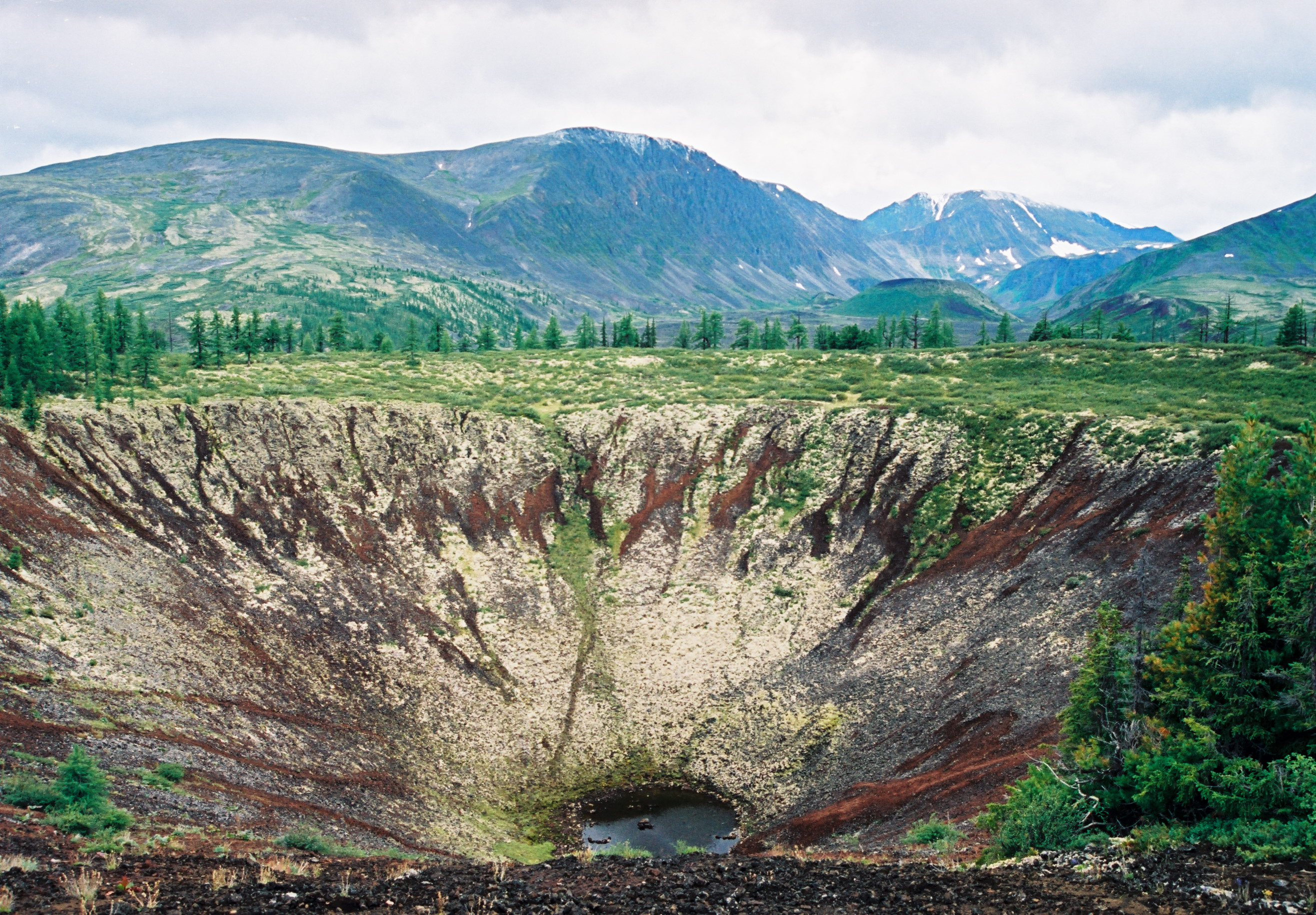
Peretolchin

== Climate, vegetation and basement rocks ==
The climate is dominated by the westerlies from the Atlantic Ocean and by the Siberian High, with a mean annual temperature of −4 °C (25 °F) and a continental climate, with annual precipitation in the region being about 430 millimetres per year (17 in/year); during marine isotope stages 5 and 4 glaciation was widespread. The vegetation is classified as "bald vegetation", which is a montane vegetation type; here it is characterized by birch, larch, Siberian fir willow. The volcanoes rise from Paleozoic intrusive rocks and various Pleistocene to Holocene sediments occur in the region; at higher elevation there is permafrost. The "Tannuola complex" is a Paleozoic rock assembly that forms the mountains around the volcanic field. Sediment cores taken in lakes of the area have been used to reconstruct the history of vegetation and climate during the Holocene.

== Eruption history ==
Volcanic activity in the field started 13,000 ka ago and took place in several separate phases, which have been grouped into one period lasting from 14,300 to 6,300 years ago and another beginning 1,600 years ago and possibly lasting to the present day. The last eruption occurred during the Holocene and has been dated at 5,180 BCE ± 140. Another date attributed to that cone is 7,130 BP ± 140. Stariy cone probably formed during early-postglacial time given the presence of glacial deposits beneath the cone's ash. This is also the age that has been attributed to the large northern lava flow; the crustal magma pond forming the flow may have formed during lithospheric unloading at the time of the Bolling-Allerod when glaciers in the East Sayan Mountains melted. The age of the Medvedev cone and flow are unknown. The eruptions at Jom-Bolok are the most voluminous Holocene eruptions of Central Asia; their volume has been estimated to be 16 cubic kilometres (3.8 cu mi).

The youngest lavas are even more recent in age, 682–779 CE. One hypothesis formulated in 2015 assumes that the Irkut-Oka plateau may be the Ergune-Kun locality referenced in Mongolian chronicles. According to Mongolian chronicles 400 years before the birth of Genghis Khan the Mongols left Ergune-Kun under the lead of a Borte Chino, in coincidence with an event involving fire. The hypothesis suggests that the leaving of the Mongols coincides with the most recent eruption of Jom-Bolok which was witnessed by the Mongols and included in their chronicles.

The field probably formed in two stages, the long lava flow formed in the first stage in the Hee-Gol valley directly followed by the Atkinson, Ostanets, Peretolchin and Pogranichniy cones. The southern lava flow was preceded by the Stariy cone forming activity, at the end of the southern flow activity the Kropotkin and Treshina cones formed. Another theory believes the Stariy and Treshina cones formed first in the whole field. The most recent model states that Staryi and Treshchina erupted in the first phase, their lavas being buried beneath more recent eruption products. Atkinson, Ostanets and Peretolchin shortly afterwards then filled the valley with lava. Kropotkin erupted in the third phase and Pogranichnyi in the fourth, both being accompanied by activity at additional vents and the latter taking place about 900 years ago.

Volcanic activity such as at Jom-Bolok can cause the injection of SO_{2} into the atmosphere. When such gas reaches the stratosphere it can cause temperature anomalies named volcanic winters. In the case of the northern field of Jom-Bolok, the total amount of SO_{2} reaching the upper troposphere would be about 50–60 megatonnes (49,000,000–59,000,000 long tons; 55,000,000–66,000,000 short tons) if one assumes a similar eruption in style to the Laki eruptions, which however took place at latitudes with a lower stratosphere. Local lakes show no evidence of tephra influence.

== Sources ==
- Arzhannikov, S.G.; Ivanov, A.V.; Arzhannikova, A.V.; Demonterova, E.I.; Jolivet, M.; Buyantuev, V.A.; Oskolkov, V.A.; Voronin, V.I. (August 2016). "The most recent (682–792 CE) volcanic eruption in the Jombolok lava field, East Sayan, Central Asia triggered exodus of Mongolian pre-Chinggis Khaan tribes (778–786 CE)" (PDF). Journal of Asian Earth Sciences. 125: 87–99. Bibcode:2016JAESc.125...87A. doi:10.1016/j.jseaes.2016.05.017. S2CID 130023892.
- Arzhannikov, S.G.; Ivanov, A.V.; Arzhannikova, A.V.; Demonterova, E.I.; Jolivet, M.; Voronin, V.I.; Buyantuev, V.A.; Oskolkov, V.A. (January 2017). "Age of the Jombolok lava field (East Sayan): evidence from dendrochronology and radiocarbon dating". Russian Geology and Geophysics. 58 (1): 20–36. Bibcode:2017RuGG...58...20A. doi:10.1016/j.rgg.2016.07.001. ISSN 1068-7971.
- Bezrukova, Elena V.; Shchetnikov, Alexander A.; Kulagina, Natalia V.; Amosova, Alena A. (October 2021). "Lateglacial and Holocene vegetation and environmental change in the Jom-Bolok volcanic region, East Sayan Mountains, South Siberia, Russia". Boreas. 50 (4): 935–947. Bibcode:2021Borea..50..935B. doi:10.1111/bor.12518. S2CID 233693197.
- Ivanov, Alexei V.; Arzhannikov, Sergei G.; Demonterova, Elena I.; Arzhannikova, Anastasia V.; Orlova, Lyubov A. (28 April 2011). "Jom-Bolok Holocene volcanic field in the East Sayan Mts., Siberia, Russia: structure, style of eruptions, magma compositions, and radiocarbon dating". Bulletin of Volcanology. 73 (9): 1279–1294. Bibcode:2011BVol...73.1279I. doi:10.1007/s00445-011-0485-9. S2CID 129870314.
- Shchetnikov, Alexander A.; Bezrukova, Elena V.; Krivonogov, Sergey K. (April 2019). "Late Glacial to Holocene volcanism of Jom-Bolok Valley (East Sayan Mountains, Siberia) recorded by microtephra layers of the Lake Kaskadnoe-1 sediments". Journal of Asian Earth Sciences. 173: 291–303. Bibcode:2019JAESc.173..291S. doi:10.1016/j.jseaes.2019.01.025. S2CID 134449935.
- Shchetnikov, Alexander; Bezrukova, Elena V. (1 November 2019). "Lakes of the Jom-Bolok Volcanoes Valley in the East Sayan Mts., Baikal region". Journal of Geographical Sciences. 29 (11): 1823–1840. doi:10.1007/s11442-019-1681-3. ISSN 1861-9568.
