= Afdera (volcano) =

Stratovolcano in Ethiopia

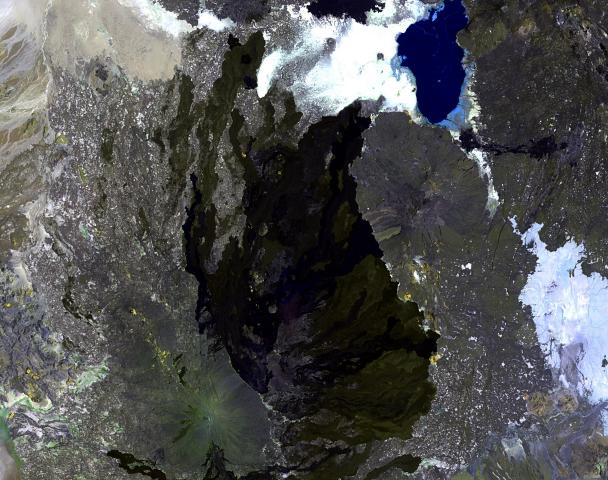
- The elongated massif extending down the center of the image is Alayta shield volcano, which covers an area of 2700 sq km in the western Danakil depression. A series of very recent craters is aligned along the NNW-trending axis of the basaltic-to-trachytic shield. The Alayta lava field, covered by very fresh lava flows, was erupted from N-S-trending fissures along the east side of the shield volcano and laps up against the western flank of Afderà volcano, immediately south of Lake Guilietti (Lake Afrera) at the upper right-center.

Highest point
- Elevation: 1,295 m (4,249 ft)
- Listing: Volcanoes of Ethiopia
- Coordinates: 13°05′17″N 40°51′11″E

Geography
- Location within Ethiopia
- Country: Ethiopia

Geology
- Mountain type: Stratovolcano
- Last eruption: Uncertain

Afdera is an isolated stratovolcano in northeastern Ethiopia, located at the intersection of three fault systems between the Erta Ale, Tat Ali, and Alayta mountain ranges.

There have been reports of the volcano erupting in 1907 and 1915 but morphological evidence cannot substantiate these claims. The reported eruptions were probably from the Mount Alayta volcano to the west.

== See also ==
- List of stratovolcanoes
