= Melka Kunture =

Paleolithic site in the upper Awash Valley, Ethiopia

Melka Kunture and Balchit: Archaeological and Palaeontological Sites in the Highland Area of Ethiopia
UNESCO World Heritage Site
- Location within Ethiopia
- Location: Oromia, Ethiopia
- Criteria: iii, iv, v
- Reference: 13rev
- Inscription: 2024 (46th Session)
- Coordinates: 8.7051°N 38.5991°E

Melka Kunture (Amharic: መልካ ቁንጥሬ) is a Paleolithic site in the upper Awash Valley, Ethiopia. It is located 50 kilometers south of Addis Ababa by road, across the Awash River from the village of Melka Awash. Three waterfalls lie downstream of the bridge across the Awash here, which provides access south to Butajira. The site became a World Heritage Site in 2024.

The Basin surface area is around 3,000 km^{2} and it is delimited by Pliocene volcanoes. The main volcanic centers are Wachacha and Furi in the North, Boti and Agoiabi in the South. Its eastern limit is marked by the main graben of the Ethiopian Rift belonging to the large East African Rift system.

The Melka Kunture area is made up of valleys whose inner terraces resisted erosion. The visible thickness of these deposits is around 30 m, but the cumulative thickness of the various levels is about 100 m. A recent structural, tephrostratigraphic and lithostratigraphic approach provides new insights into the evolution of the environmental background for hominin activities in this area. The valley of the Awash River has been a focus of hominin occupation since 4 to 5 Ma. The Awash regularly reestablished its course after each important volcanic episode and each time established a new basal level of erosion. The water flow of this river and its tributaries provided the sedimentary context of reworked volcanic materials that buried and preserved the archaeological sites within the Melka Kunture Formation.

== History of research ==
The site, discovered by Gerard Dekker in 1963, was surveyed by Gérard Bailloud in 1964, and then systematically explored by a French mission directed by Jean Chavaillon (1965–1982 / 1993–1995). Since 1999, an Italian mission directed by Marcello Piperno for the Italian Ministry of Foreign Affairs and the University of Rome "La Sapienza" has worked at the site in agreement with the Authority for Research and Conservation of Cultural Heritage of the Ethiopian Ministry of Culture and Tourism and the Oromia Culture and Tourism Bureau.

== Archaeological sequences ==
Archaeologists have uncovered over 30 occupation sites at Melka Kunture. The finds are dated by volcanic depositions left by eruptions of Mount Zuqualla, northeast of Melka Kunture. Palaeoenvironmental analysis indicates the site was a mixed upland habitat.

It has been suggested that Oldowan and early Acheulean archaeological remains from Melka Kunture date back to as early as 2.0 Ma, although this has since been shown to be untenable by detailed chronostratigraphic analysis.

The sequence begins with the Oldowan site of Karre, about 1.7 million years old, which can be correlated to level B of Gombore I, on the right bank of the Awash. A probably contemporaneous Oldowan site is documented at Garba IV. The magneto-stratigraphic sequence of Jaramillo lies between Tuff A, which overlies the Oldowan sites, and Tuff B, which is dated between 1.0 and 0.84 million years ago. Some important sites, such as Garba XII and Simbiro III, datable to a transitional phase from the late Oldowan to the Early Acheulean (Garba XII) or to an archaic phase of the Acheulean (Simbiro), also lie within this chronological span.

A later phase of the African Acheulean is well represented by several sites in the area of Gombore II (dated to about 0.8 mya). The latest Acheulean site is Garba I, dated to ca. 0.5 mya, while the end of this long sequence is represented, at Melka Kunture, by the site of Garba III, approximately dated to 0.2 mya, which can be regarded as a transitional site towards the Middle Stone Age. Some of the above-listed levels yielded hominid remains: a humerus fragment of H. cf. erectus at Gombore I; a hemimandible of a H. cf. erectus child at Garba IV; two H. erectus skull fragments at Gombore II; and three archaic H. sapiens skull fragments at Garba III.

The East African Later Stone Age is poorly documented at Melka Kunture, being represented so far by some finds at Wofi and Kella. A little less than 7 km from Melka Kunture, at a site known as Balchit, are imposing outcrops of obsidian. As recent analyses from samples from several sites in Melka Kunture bear out, these outcrops were used, ever since the earliest Oldowan phases, as an important source of raw material. The exploitation of obsidian in the Melka region went on until historical times, leaving numerous and extensive accumulations of tens of thousands of blades, cores, and scars of this volcanic rock.

== Exhibits ==
A museum was built at the site by the Oromia Culture and Tourism Commission with financial assistance from the European Community, consisting of four buildings with exhibits—one on prehistoric Africa, another on geology and volcanology, a third on paleoanthropology, the fourth on the prehistory of Melka Kunture. There is also an "Open Air Museum," which displays the excavation of two Acheulean sites that have been dated to 0.8 million years BP. Currently (May, 2016) a new museum is under construction, which is funded by the World Bank.
