= Korath Range =

Mountain range in Ethiopia

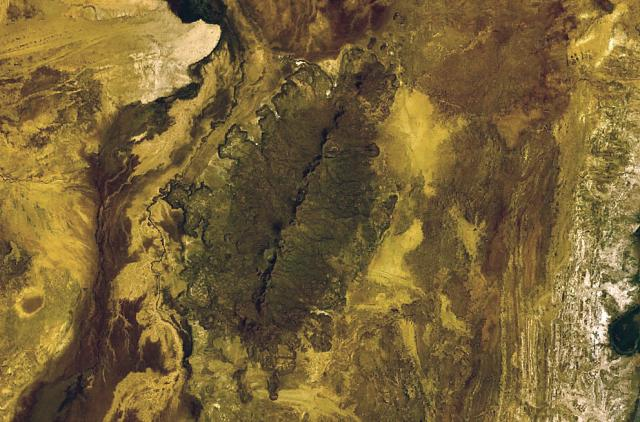
- Satellite image of the Korath Range

Highest point
- Peak: Mount Nakwa
- Elevation: 912 m (2,992 ft)
- Listing: List of volcanoes in Ethiopia
- Coordinates: 5.1°N 35.88°E

Geography
- Location within Ethiopia
- Country: Ethiopia
- State: Southern Nations, Nationalities, and Peoples' Region

Geology
- Formed by: Tuff cones
- Last eruption: Unknown

The Korath Range is a mountain range in the Southern Nations, Nationalities, and Peoples' Region of southern Ethiopia. It consists of an isolated cluster of about 20 tuff cones, many of which produced 5 km (3.1 mi) long lava flows that are dominantly basanitic and tephritic in composition. The youngest lava flow, which issued from a cone in the middle of the range, has been radiocarbon dated at 7900 BP, although a more recent radiocarbon date of between 30,000 BP and 7900-9500 BP has also been obtained.

The Korath Range was emplaced along the Lake Turkana Rift, a segment of the East African Rift that extends north from Kenya. Mount Nakwa is the highest point of the Korath Range with a summit elevation of 912 m (2,992 ft).

== See also ==
- List of volcanoes in Ethiopia
