= Mount Alayta =

Shield volcano in Ethiopia

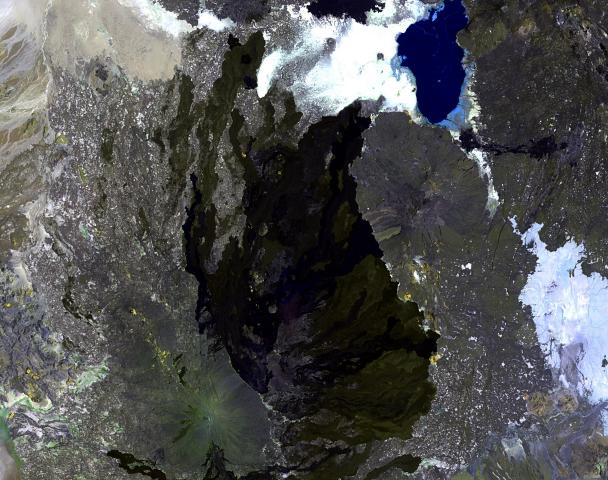

Highest point
- Elevation: 1,501 m (4,925 ft)
- Listing: List of volcanoes in Ethiopia
- Coordinates: 12°53′N 40°34′E

Geography
- Location within Ethiopia
- Location: Afar Depression, Afar Region, Ethiopia

Geology
- Mountain type: Shield volcano
- Last eruption: 1915

Mount Alayta is an active shield volcano in the Afar Region of Ethiopia. It is part of the Afar Triangle (Afar Depression), a highly active volcanic region which includes the adjacent Mount Afdera. Mount Alayta covers an area of 2,700 square kilometers (1042.5 square miles) southwest of Lake Afrera. A chain of younger craters are aligned along a north-northwest axis in the basaltic-to-trachytic shield along the east side of the shield volcano, which extends to the western flank of Mount Afdera. The Alayta Lavafeld was formed from a series of north-south fissures. In two areas on the southern side of the volcanic complex, fumaroles can be observed.

Two historical eruptions that were formerly attributed to Mount Afdera are believed to have originated from Alayta. One of those eruptions, between June and August 1907, produced a large lava flow from a vent on its southeastern flank. Its most recent eruption was in 1915.

== See also ==
- Erta Ale
- Geography of Ethiopia
