= Battle of Hazalo =

- Part of the Oromo Expansions
Date	1559
Location	Mount Hazalo near Awash River, Adal Sultanate
Result	Oromo victory: Oromo begin gradually occupying parts of Hararghe; Beginning of the collapse of Adal Sultanate

Belligerents
Adal Sultanate	Oromo

Commanders and leaders
Nur ibn Mujahid	Michelle Gada

Strength
Unknown	Unknown

Casualties and losses
Heavy	Unknown

The Battle of Hazalo was fought between the forces of Adal Sultanate led by Nur ibn Mujahid, and Oromo of Gadaa Michile in 1559. Nur and his troops were returning from a victory at the Battle of Fatagar against the Ethiopian Imperial army, when they were ambushed sustaining heavy casualties. Adal's elite soldiers the Malassay were killed in large number effectively ending the Harari states regional superiority.

== Background ==
In March 1559, Emir Nur (1552–67) the Muslim leader from Harar, destroyed the Christian military including its leadership. A few weeks later the Muslim force itself was liquidated at the Battle of Hazalo. The Oromos' next move was to invade the Adal. From lowland Dawaro, they (Oromo) crossed over to Adal and waited in hiding in the forests of Mount Hazalo.

== Battle ==
According to Milkias, "The Michile Gada age group made a surprise attack at Hazalo and annihilated the forces of Sultan Ali Nur, a nephew of Gragn who avenged the death of his uncle by killing his Emperor Gelawdewos on the battlefield and who was marching home to prepare another campaign and reconquer Christian Ethiopia.
