= List of volcanoes in Ethiopia =

This is a list of volcanoes in Ethiopia. It includes both active and extinct vents.

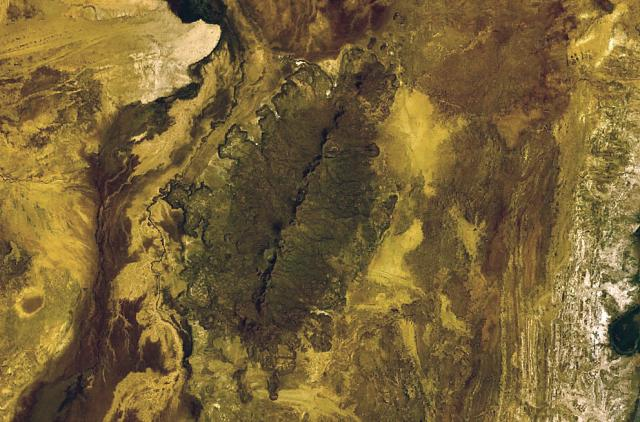
The fissure-controlled Korath Range, along the Turkana Rift

Name	Elevation		Location	Last eruption
Name	meters	feet	Coordinates	Last eruption
Adwa	1733	528	10.07°N 40.84°E	Holocene
Afdera	1295	5686	13.08°N 40.85°E	Holocene
Alayta	1501	4924	12.88°N 41.57°E	1915
Ale Bagu	1031	3883	13.52°N 40.63°E	November 23,2025
Alu	429	1407	13.82°N 40.56°E	2008
Alutu	2335	7661	7.77°N 38.78°E	1550
Amoissa	1733	5684	10.069°N 40.837°E	-
Asavyo	1200	3937	13.07°N 41.60°E	Holocene
Asmara	500	–	11.27°N 41.52°E	Holocene
Ayalu	2145	7037	10.08°N 40.70°E	1928
Beru	1100	3609	8.95°N 39.75°E	Holocene
Bilate River Field	1700	5577	7.07°N 38.10°E	Holocene
Bishoftu Volcanic Field	1850	6069	8.78°N 38.98°E	Holocene
Bora-Bericcio	2285	7497	8.27°N 39.03°E	Holocene
Borale Ale	668	2192	13.725°N 40.60°E	Holocene
Borawli	812	2664	13.30°N 40.98°E	Holocene
Boset-Bericha	2447	8028	8.558°N 39.475°E	Holocene
Butajiri-Silti Field	2281	7484	8.05°N 38.35°E	-
Chiracha	1650	5413	6.65°N 38.12°E	Holocene
Corbetti Caldera	2320	7611	7.18°N 38.43°E	396 BC
Dabbahu	1442	4731	12.60°N 40.48°E	2005
Dabbayra	1302	4272	12.38°N 40.07°E	Holocene
Dalaffilla	613	2011	13.7920°N 40.5500°E	2008
Dallol	-48	-157	14.24°N 40.30°E	2011
Dama Ali	1068	3504	11.28°N 41.63°E	1631
Dendi	3260	10,692	9.0°N 38.0°E	-
Dofen	1151	3776	9.35°N 40.13°E	Holocene
East Zway	1889	6097	7.95°N 38.93°E	-
Erta Ale	613	2011	13.60°N 40.67°E	1967 to present
Mount Fentale	2007	6585	8.97°N 39.93°E	1820
Gabillema	1459	4787	11.08°N 41.27°E	Holocene
Gada Ale	287	942	13.975°N 40.408°E	Holocene
Gariboldi Caldera	1619	–	8.80°N 39.69°E	-
Gedamsa Caldera	1984	6509	8.35°N 39.18°E	Holocene
Groppo	930	3051	11.73°N 40.25°E	Holocene
Hayli Gubbi	521	1709	13.50°N 40.72°E	2025 (ongoing)
Hertali	900	2953	9.78°N 40.33°E	Holocene
Hobitcha Caldera	1800	5905	6.78°N 37.83°E	Holocene
Kone	1619	5312	8.8°N 39.69°E	1820
Korath Range	912	2992	5.10°N 35.88°E	Holocene
Kurub	625	2051	11.88°N 41.208°E	Holocene
Liado Hayk	878	2881	9.57°N 40.28°E	Holocene
Ma Alalta	1815	5955	13.02°N 40.20°E	Holocene
Mallahle	1875	6152	13.27°N 41.65°E	Holocene
Manda Hararo	600	1968	12.17°N 40.82°E	2009
Manda-Inakir	600	1968	12.38°N 42.20°E	1928
Mat Ala	523	1716	13.10°N 41.15°E	Holocene
Mega Basalt Field	1067	3501	4.08°N 37.42°E	Holocene
O'a Caldera	2075	6808	7.47°N 38.58°E	-
Sabober	–	-	8.97°N 39.93°E	-
Lake Shala	2075	6806	7.47°N 38.55°E	-
Sodore	1765	5791	8.43°N 39.35°E	Holocene
Sork Ale	1611	5285	13.18°N 41.725°E	Holocene
Tat Ali	700	2297	13.28°N 41.07°E	Holocene
Teppi	2728	8950	7.42°N 35.43°E	Holocene
Tosa Sucha	1650	5413	5.92°N 37.57°E	Holocene
Tullu Moje	2349	7707	8.15°N 39.13°E	1900
Wonchi	3450	11,316	9.0°N 38.0°E	-
Mount Yangudi	1383	4537	10.58°N 41.042°E	Holocene
Mount Zuqualla	2800	9184	8.32°N 38.52°E	-

== See also ==
- List of mountains in Ethiopia
- Geography of Ethiopia
- Lists of volcanoes
