= Ma Alalta =

Stratovolcano in Ethiopia

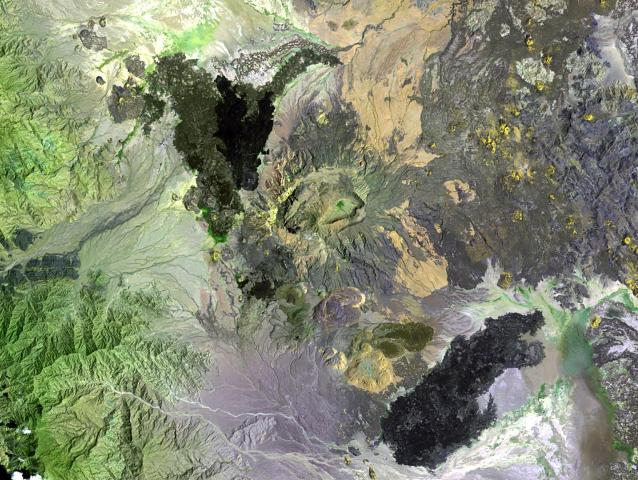
- Satellite image of Ma Alalta (center)

Highest point
- Elevation: 1,745 or 1,815 m (5,725 or 5,955 ft)
- Listing: List of volcanoes in Ethiopia
- Coordinates: 13.013°N 40.185°E

Geography
- Location within Ethiopia
- Location: Afar Region, Ethiopia

Geology
- Mountain type: Stratovolcano
- Last eruption: Unknown

Ma Alalta is a stratovolcano in the Afar Region of Ethiopia, located well to the west of the Danakil Depression at the foot of the regional Ethiopian scarp. It has a summit elevation of 1,745 m (5,725 ft) and lies between two large horsts related to the East African Rift. It's height is alternately listed as 1815 m (5954 ft).

Ma Alalta is trachytic and rhyolitic in composition, containing nested oval-shaped calderas at its summit. Extending northeast and southeast of the stratovolcano are ignimbrite deposits that may be related to the formation of a larger caldera in which Ma Alalta is located.

The northwestern, southeastern and eastern flanks of Ma Alalta have produced youthful basaltic lava flows whereas the southern flank has produced recent pantelleritic obsidian domes and lava flows. One of the domes exhibit fumarolic activity.
