= Tadekho Creek =

Tribuatary river in the country of Canada

- Mouth of Tadekho Creek

Location
- Country: Canada
- Province: British Columbia
- District: Cassiar Land District

Physical characteristics
- Source: Kuno Peak
  - location: Spectrum Range
  - coordinates: 57°22′24″N 130°42′50″W
  - elevation: 2,030 m (6,660 ft)
- Mouth: Mess Creek
  - coordinates: 57°26′32″N 130°54′4″W
  - elevation: 715 m (2,346 ft)
- Length: 18 km (11 mi)
- Basin size: 87.1 km^{2} (33.6 sq mi)
- Discharge
  - average: 2.58 m^{3}/s (91 cu ft/s)

Basin features
- Topo map: NTS 104G7 Mess Lake

Tadekho Creek is a tributary of Mess Creek and part of the Stikine River watershed in northwest part of the province of British Columbia, Canada. It flows generally northwest for roughly 18 km (11 mi) to join Mess Creek just north of Mess Lake.

Tadekho Creek's mean annual discharge is estimated at 2.58 m^{3}/s (91 cu ft/s). Its watershed covers 87.1 km^{2} (33.6 sq mi) and is almost entirely in Mount Edziza Provincial Park. Only a small part of the upper reaches of one of the creek's southernmost tributaries extends outside the park boundary. The watershed's land cover is classified as 37.8% barren, 22.3% shrubland, 21.7% conifer forest, 13.0% herbaceous, 4.8% snow/glacier, and small amounts of other cover.

The mouth of Tadekho Creek is located about 55 km (34 mi) south of Telegraph Creek, British Columbia, about 64 km (40 mi) northwest of Bob Quinn Lake, British Columbia, and about 230 km (140 mi) southeast of Juneau, Alaska.

Tadekho Creek is in Mount Edziza Provincial Park, which lies within the traditional territory of the Tahltan First Nation, of the Tahltan people.

The name "Tadekho" is a compound word created by Geological Survey of Canada from the Tahltan words tade meaning "three", and kho meaning "grizzly bear". The survey party had been forced to relocate their camp adjacent to this creek because of a mother grizzly bear and two curious cubs.

== Geography ==
Tadekho Creek originates on the slopes of Kuno Peak in the Spectrum Range, about 38 km (24 mi) south of Mount Edziza. From its source, Tadekho Creek flows north of Tadekho Hill and Exile Hill, and south of Outcast Hill on the northern end of the Arctic Lake Plateau. Flowing generally northwest, Tadekho Creek receives numerous small tributaries and one large but unnamed tributary that originates from the vicinity of Yeda Peak and flows north of Kuno Peak and Outcast Hill. After receiving this tributary, Tadekho Creek flows another 5 km (3.1 mi) before emptying into Mess Creek just south of Mess Lake.

Tadekho Creek's watershed is within the southern part of the Mount Edziza volcanic complex.

== See also ==
- List of rivers of British Columbia
