= Tat Ali =

Volcano in Ethiopia

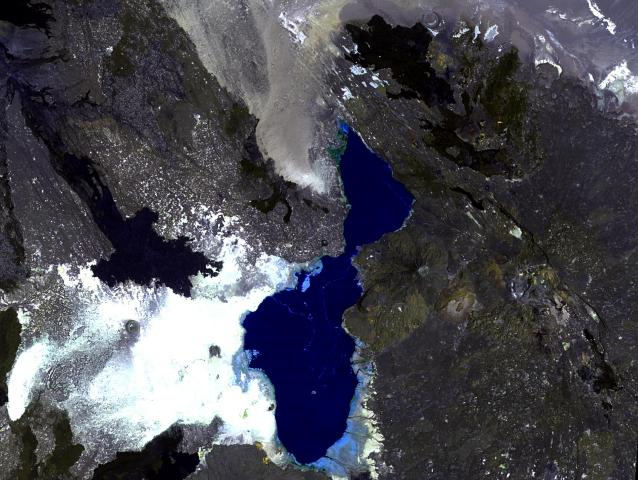

Highest point
- Elevation: 655 m (2,149 ft)
- Coordinates: 13.28°N 41.07°E

Geography
- Location: Afar Region, Ethiopia
- Parent range: Tat Ali Range

Geology
- Mountain type: Shield volcano
- Last eruption: Unknown

Tat Ali is a low Holocene shield volcano located in the northern part of the Afar Region of Ethiopia. This elevation is characterized as having an elongated summit depression that has produced a variety of rock types, ranging from basalts to pantellerites. NNW-SSE-trending fissures cutting the volcano have fed basaltic lava flows; those NE of Lake Afrera are of prehistoric date. Late-stage volcanism produced youthful basaltic lava flows on the floor of the summit depression, which is also the site of prominent fumarolic activity.

Tat Ali, Erta Ale, Alu and other Ethiopian Highlands are together known as the Danakil Alps.

== See also ==
- List of volcanoes in Ethiopia
