= Gada Ale =

Stratovolcano in Afar Region, Ethiopia

- Location within Ethiopia

Highest point
- Elevation: 287 m (942 ft)
- Coordinates: 13.975°N 40.408°E

Geography
- Location: Afar Region, Ethiopia
- Parent range: Erta Ale Range

Geology
- Mountain type: Stratovolcano
- Last eruption: Unknown

Gada Ale is a stratovolcano located in the Afar Region, Ethiopia. It is the most prominent volcano at the northern end of the Erta Ale Range, which runs through the centre of the Danakil Depression.

== See also ==
- List of volcanoes in Ethiopia
- List of stratovolcanoes
