= Wonchi (volcano) =

Volcano in Oromia Region, Ethiopia

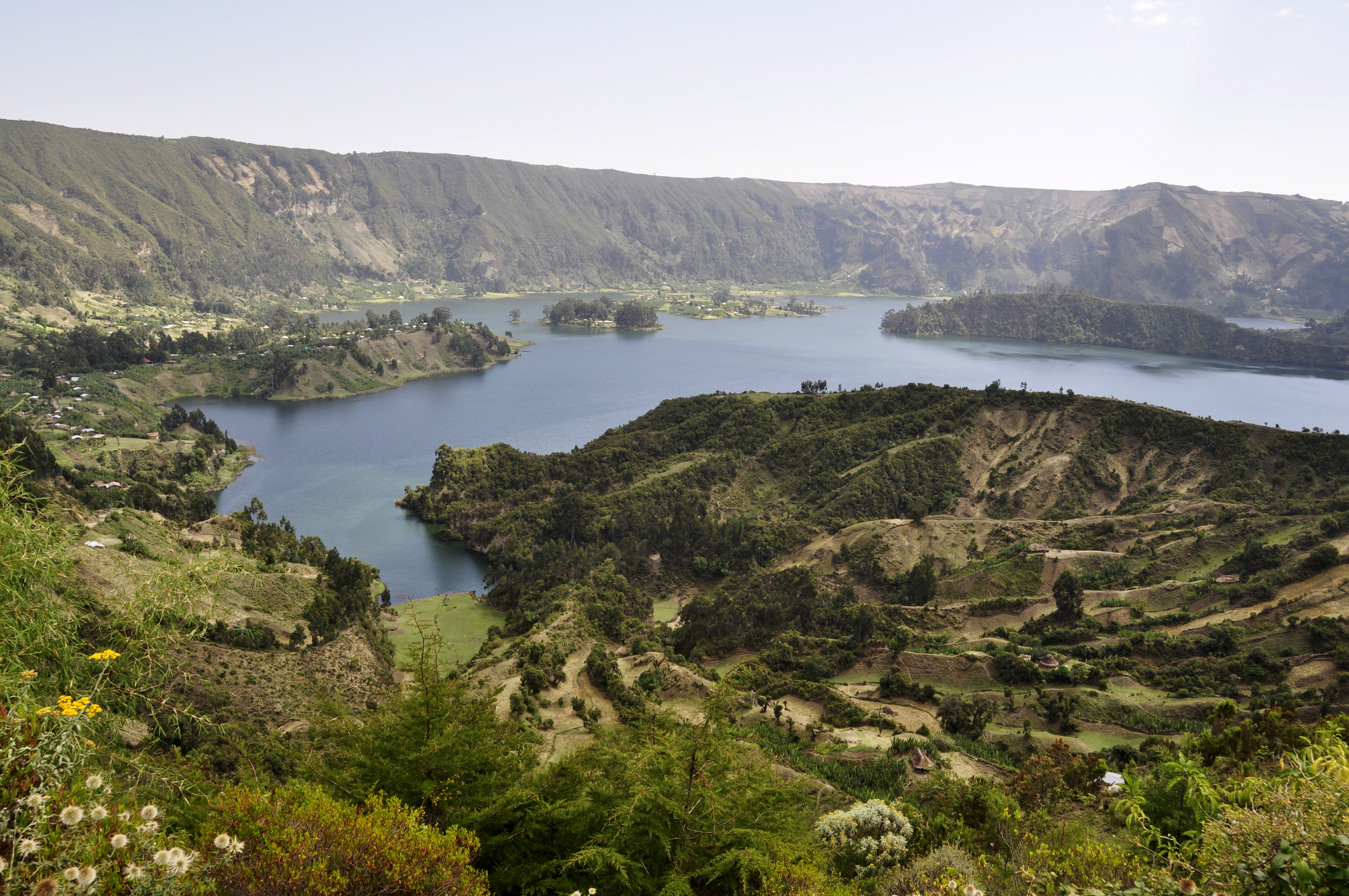

Highest point
- Elevation: 3,450 m (11,320 ft)
- Listing: Volcanoes of Ethiopia
- Coordinates: 08°50′34″N 38°00′40″E

Geography
- Location within Ethiopia
- Country: Ethiopia

Geology
- Last eruption: 550

Wenchi crater lake, also spelled as Wancii or Wonchi, is a volcano located 98 km (61 mi) west of Addis Ababa, in Oromia Region, Ethiopia. At 3,450 m (11,320 ft) above sea level, it is the highest volcano in Ethiopia, 13.5 km (8.4 mi) from Mount Dendi, Ethiopia's second highest volcano. Wonchi is located at equal distance between the towns of Ambo and Woliso. It erupted in the Tertiary period of the Cenozoic Era.

== Features ==
The volcano has a 4 by 4.8 km (2.5 by 3.0 mi) wide caldera, and a single crater lake, Wonchi lake, about 450 m (1,480 ft) below the rim of the volcano. Study of Wonchi's caldera is incomplete; initial findings show it could be as much as 900 m (3,000 ft) deep, and the lake itself could be as deep as 400 m (1,300 ft).

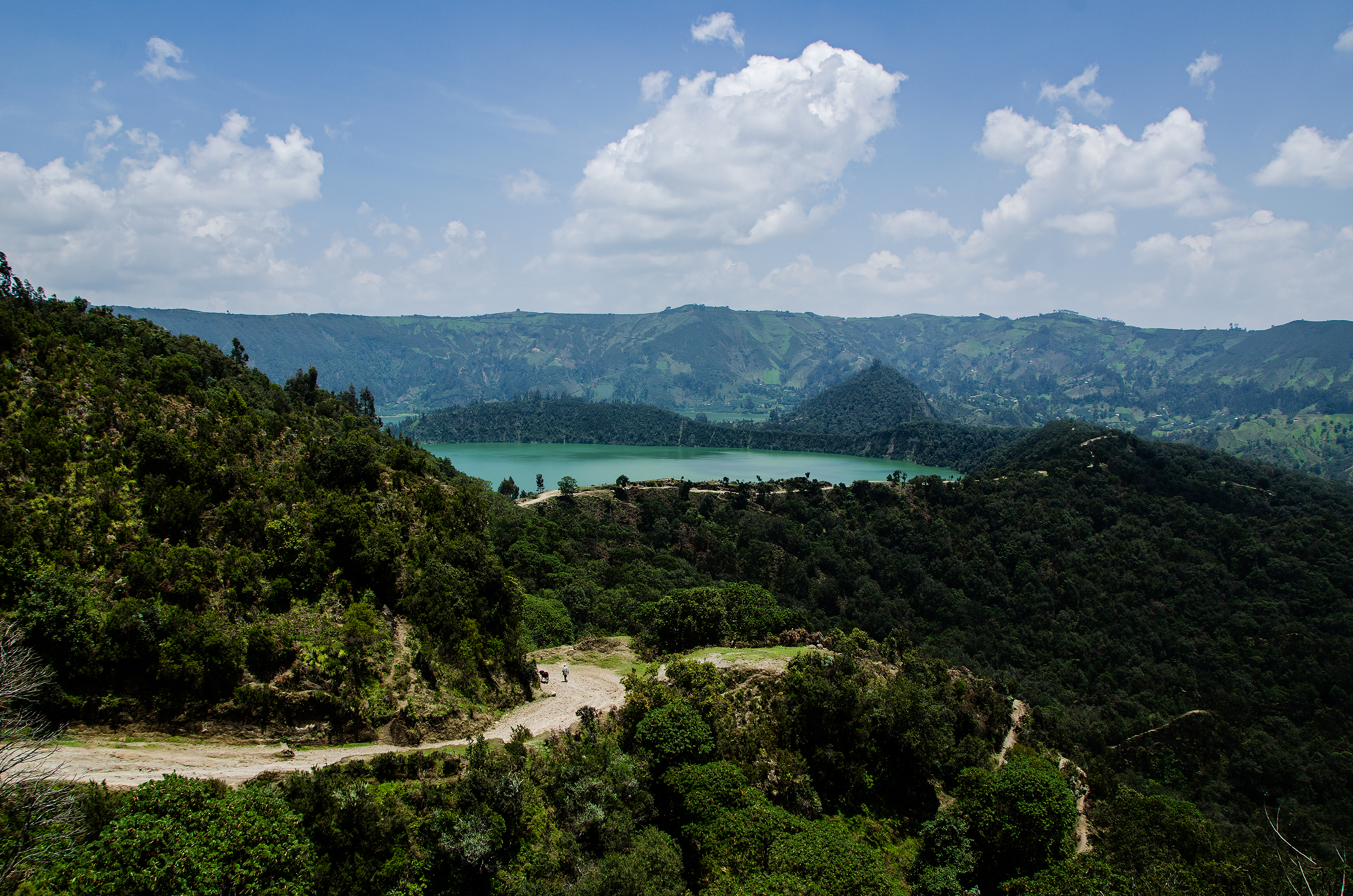
Wanchi Lake

Besides Wonchi lake, the caldera also contains hot springs, waterfalls, valleys, and other scenery. There are two islands in the lake. On one of the islands there is an ancient church called Cherkos monastery. The monastery is thought to have been built in the 13th century by St. Tekle Haymanot and rebuilt in the 15th century by Emperor Zara Yaqob. It houses a huge church bell known as the "Gondar bell" in honor of the alleged Gondar-reigning Emperor Fasilidas.One can reach the islands and the monastery by ferry. Due to its unique topography, Wanchi has a wide variety of animal and plant species. For these reasons, Wanchi has become a popular tourist destination in Ethiopia. This has been the case even though there was no dry weather road. Since the construction of Ambo-Waliso gravel road, tourism has emerged as one of the rapidly growing economic sectors in the district, Wanchi lake becoming a favored weekend destination for residents of nearby cities including Addis Ababa. The tourist can hire horses to take down the mountain to the lake. It takes about one hour from the volcano rim to reach the lake side.

The Office of Prime Minister Abiy Ahmed has worked on developing the destination and increasing tourist flow to the area with its most recent development project, "Dine for Ethiopia."

A new eco-resort is being built in Wonchi by Ethiopian Airlines. Displaced farmers were given small homes around the lakeside in a special development. There is currently no sustainable development plan for the lake and its Christian population. Locals offer horse rides down to the lake, and rowers give boat rides to and around the island inhabited by a monk who has lived there for more than 10 years.
