= Mount Dendi =

Volcano in central Ethiopia

Dendi
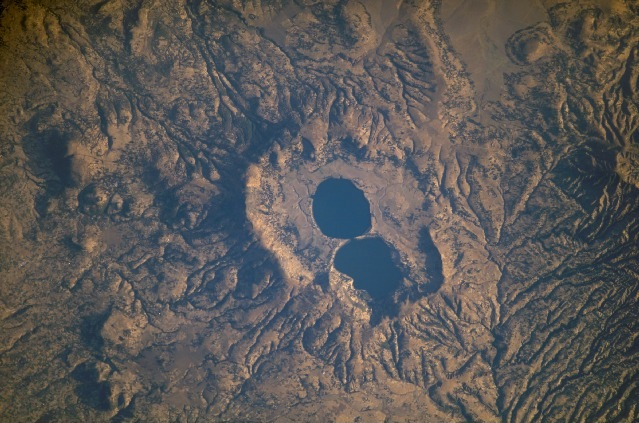

Highest point
- Elevation: 3,260 m (10,700 ft)
- Listing: Volcanoes of Ethiopia
- Coordinates: 08°50′34″N 38°00′41″E

Geography
- Location within Ethiopia
- Country: Ethiopia

Mount Dendi is a volcano located near the city of Addis Ababa, in Ethiopia. It has an 8 km (5.0 mi) wide caldera, and its highest point is Mount Bodi at 3,260 m (10,700 ft). It fully contains Lake Dendi. It is the second highest volcano in Ethiopia, only 13.5 km (8.4 mi) from Wonchi, Ethiopia's highest volcano.
