= Adwa (volcano) =

Stratovolcano in Ethiopia

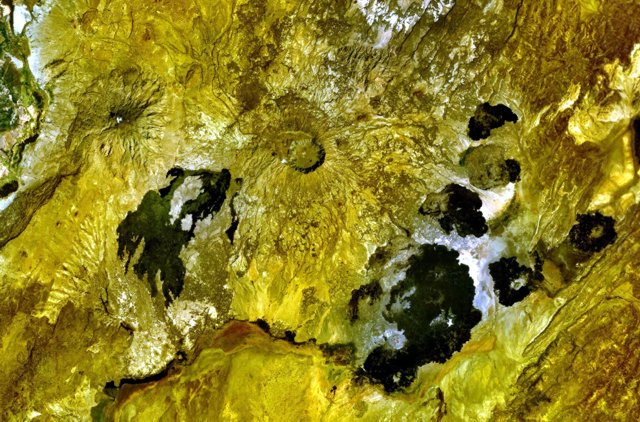

Highest point
- Elevation: 1,733 m (5,686 ft)
- Listing: List of volcanoes in Ethiopia
- Coordinates: 10°04′12″N 40°50′24″E

Geography
- Location within Ethiopia
- Location: Ethiopia

Geology
- Mountain type: Stratovolcano
- Last eruption: 1928 (uncertain)

Adwa (also known as Caaduba, Amoissa, or Dabita) (1733 m/5686 ft.) is a stratovolcano in Ethiopia, located in the western Afar Region region and has a 4 by 5 km caldera. Due to the location of the volcano near the boundary between Afar and Issa tribes, little is known about the past and present behavior of the volcano. However, an earthquake and InSAR study conducted by Derek Keir and colleagues shows that a magma intrusion around 5 km deep and 8 km long emanated away from the eastern side of the volcano in May 2000.

== See also ==
- List of stratovolcanoes
