= Borawli =

Highest point
- Elevation: 812 m (2,664 ft)
- Coordinates: 13.30°N 40.98°E

Geography
- Location: Afar Region, Ethiopia
- Parent range: Tat Ali Range

Geology
- Mountain type: Stratovolcano
- Last eruption: Unknown

Borawli is a stratovolcano with lava domes, located in Administrative Zone 2 of the Afar Region, Ethiopia. It lies above the eastern shore of Lake Afrera.

== See also ==
- List of volcanoes in Ethiopia
- List of stratovolcanoes
