= Baikal Rift Zone =

Part of the Amur-Eurasian tectonic boundary

Coordinates: 53.5°N 108.0°E

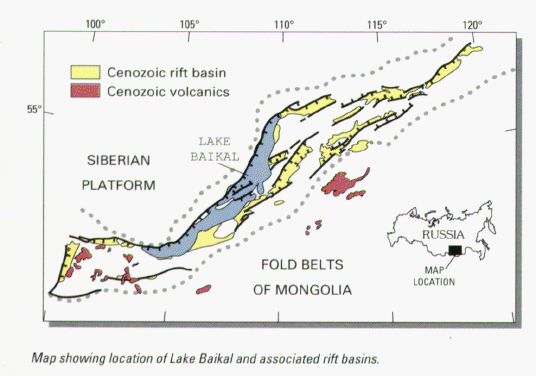
Map of the Lake Baikal Rift Zone from the USGS factsheet

The Baikal Rift Zone is a series of continental rifts centered beneath Lake Baikal in southeastern Russia. Current strain in the rifts tends to be extending with some shear movement. A series of basins form along the zone for more than 2,000 kilometres (1,200 mi), creating a rift valley. The rifts form between the Eurasian plate to the west and the Amur plate to the east.

== Structures ==
To the northwest of the rifts is the Siberian Craton, on the Eurasian plate. The Sayan-Baikal and Mongolia-Okhotsk mobile belts are formations to the southeast of the rifts; beyond the Sayan-Baikal fold belt is the Amur plate.

Basins form along the rift. There are three basins in the area, the South Basin, Central Basin, and North Basin. In the North, half-grabens form smaller basins, such as the North Baikal Basin, and the Chara-Tokka Basin. The Central Basin is the deepest in the rift system. The largest fault it contains is the Morskiy Fault; however, another fault, the Primorsky is becoming the primary fault in the rift. The basins also display evidence of crustal thinning below the rift zone.

The thickness of the crust beneath the rift is disputed, as the structures of the rift deep beneath the surface are unknown. The difference in thickness of the crust, between the crust under the rift and that under the surrounding areas, has been bounded to be less than 10 kilometres (6.2 mi). Although some seismic data is evidence for a rise in the Lithosphere-Asthenosphere boundary, other researchers have claimed that there are deep structures which influence seismic activity, and that the lower crust is intruded by mafic sills. They interpret the extension as a pure shear process.

== Volcanism ==
Volcanism is generally associated with the rift. Hot springs are present both on land and under Lake Baikal, although thus far, no evidence of actual volcanism has been found in the immediate vicinity of the lake. Despite this, Cenozoic volcanism has occurred nearby and is probably associated with the Baikal Rift Zone. Early volcanism has been confirmed to exist from the early Miocene, although it is believed that Oligocene Volcanism exists. The recognized volcanic centers are the Udokan Plateau, located about 400 km ENE of the northern tip of Lake Baikal, the Oka Plateau, located about 200 km WNW of the southwest tip of Lake Baikal, the Vitim Plateau, around 200 km east of the rift, and the Azas Plateau.

== Geological history ==
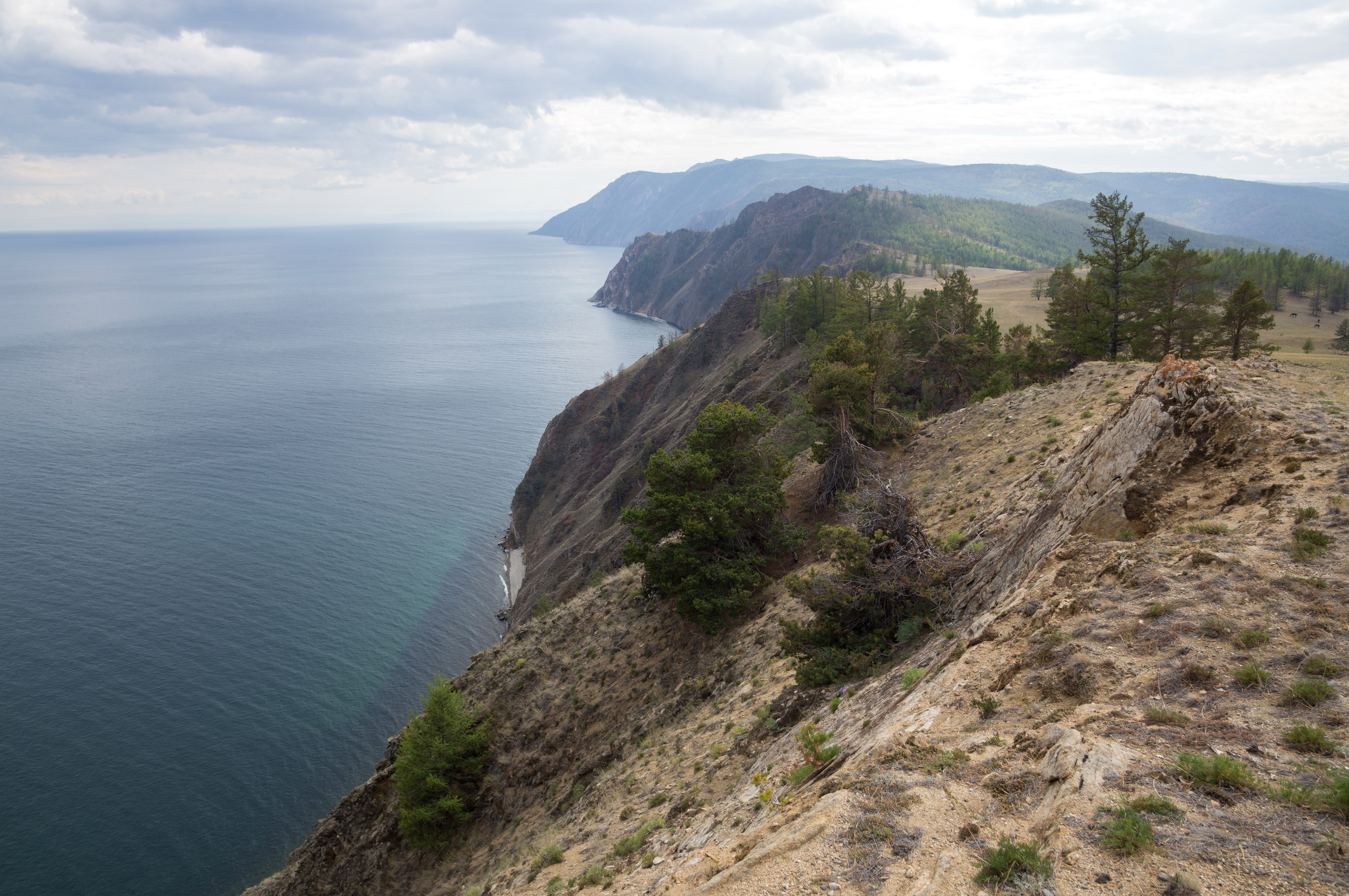
The deepest part of the rift valley lies to the east of Olkhon Island.

The area was originally characterized by Precambrian and Paleozoic northeast-southwest fold and thrust belts. The Primorsky fault zone of the central basin was present at this time also. Volcanism began in the late Cretaceous in limited areas, but is mostly limited to the Miocene. The late Cretaceous is also the age of sedimentary rocks in some basins, and the same series lasted into the Eocene. Rifting resumed beginning in the Oligocene, and is commonly held to have increased since the middle Pliocene, causing the formation of basins in the form of grabens. The new rift structure may follow the Precambrian and Paleozoic faults, such as when the dormant Primorsky fault, of the Central Basin, began to extend again in the late Cenozoic. Magmatic activity and rifting may also be independent events. Outside of the grabens basalt volcanics erupted from either end of the rift system during the uplift. The grabens mostly spread without releasing magma, except the Tunkin Depression.

Most basin deposits are from the late Oligocene, except in the north where basin deposits began in the Pliocene. Three series of sediment are present; the 'proto-rift', the 'middle rift', and the 'modern rift'. The proto-rift unit is made of shallow-water deposits and is often folded and faulted. Overlying this unit, separated by a small unconformity, is the 'middle rift' unit of Pliocene coarse grained sandstones and conglomerates. Finally there is the modern rift unit of fluvial, glacial, and deltaic sediments. Examining Pliocene and younger sediments reveals sands, argillites, and silts, indicating lacustrine deposition.

== Seismic monitoring ==
The first seismic station in the region was opened in Irkutsk in 1901, which began instrumental observations. New instruments were put in place in 1912, and the system was expanded in the 1950s and 1960s. The monitoring network is still in operation, although the minimum spacing has been criticized for exceeding 100 kilometres (62 mi) in the minimum distance between stations. Studies from foreign experiments also provide new information about the rift system.

== Tectonic stress and strain ==
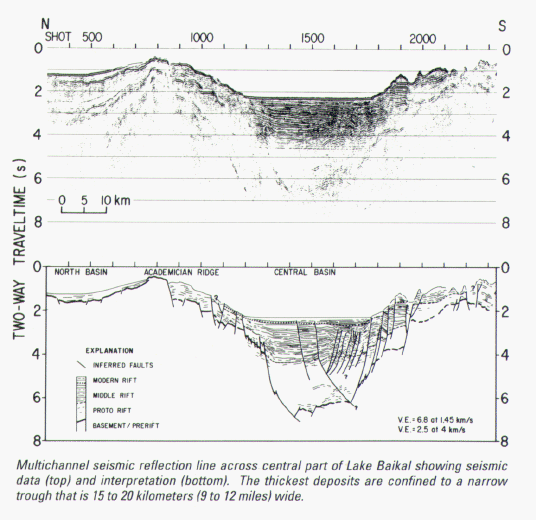
Interpreted seismic reflection profile across Lake Baikal from the USGS factsheet

Along the boundary both normal and shear strains have occurred in the rift. Plates are diverging along the boundary at 3 to 4 millimetres (0.12 to 0.16 in) per year, although this varies along the system. In addition to divergent movement, left lateral strike-slip movement also occurs in the fault system, such as along the Sayan Fault. The rate of slip has been estimated at 3.2 ± 0.5 millimetres (0.126 ± 0.020 in) per year in the north by looking at offsets of morphological features, although this estimate does not agree with current models. The total throw that has occurred has been estimated at 7 ± 0.5 kilometres (4.35 ± 0.31 mi) in extension and 12 ± 1 kilometre (7.46 ± 0.62 mi) in the vertical direction.

Due to the distance from active plate boundaries, the driving forces of the rift are unknown; however, possibilities include the subduction of the Pacific plate and the collision of the Indian subcontinent with Eurasia. Locally, there may be a mantle up-welling driving the extension. This latter theory is held by most Russian scientists.

== See also ==
- Examples of rift systems
