= Mount Hay (Ethiopia) =

Mountain in Ethiopia

Coordinates: 13°21′N 38°21′E

Mount Hay, or Amba Hay, is a mountain in the northwestern Amhara Region of Ethiopia. It is located in the Simien Mountains National Park, close to the nation's highest peak of Ras Dashen. Mount Hay has an elevation of 4173 metres above sea level.

== History ==
Since the early years of the Zemene Mesafint period, an Amhara noble named Ras Gebre ( 1771-1815 ) governed Semien for more than four decades. Inchetkaub was the capital of Semien under him and his successors. On Amba Hay was their fortress stronghold and the main residence of the family.
