= Manda Hararo =

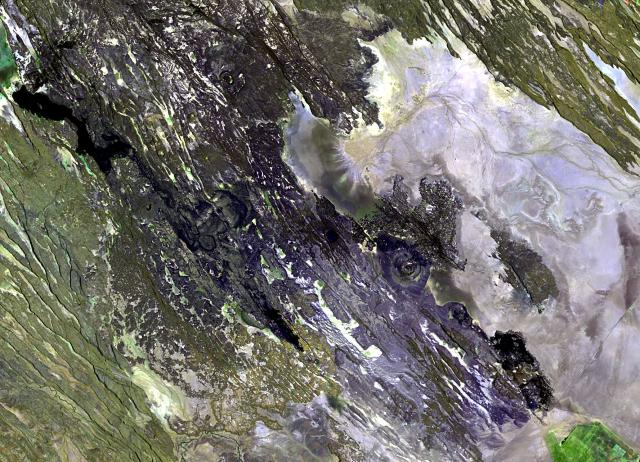
- Satellite image of Manda Hararo

Highest point
- Elevation: 600 m (2,000 ft)
- Coordinates: 12°10′0″N 40°49′0″E

Geography
- Location within Ethiopia
- Location: Ethiopia, Danakil Depression

Geology
- Mountain type: Shield Volcanoes
- Last eruption: June to July 2009

Manda Hararo is a group of basaltic shield volcanoes in the Afar region of Ethiopia that last erupted in 2009. The group is large, spreading over 105 square kilometres (41 sq mi), and located within the active Manda Hararo rift. At its northern end is a small cluster. South of this volcano is the Gumatmali-Gablaytu fissure system, an area dominated by fissure-fed lava flows. At the centre of the complex rise two volcanoes.

== Eruptions ==
=== 2007 eruption ===
Manda Hararo erupted on August 13, 2007. NASA's Aura Satellite detected a large sulfur dioxide plume over Ethiopia and Sudan. Satellite imagery showed a lava flow emitted by Manda Hararo. Local residents reported that no precursors to the eruption had taken place. The first sign was a sudden, heavy, cracking sound with a slight tremor. At 17:30, fire was seen coming from Manda Hararo, "lighting up the entire area." Locals evacuated while the violent eruptions continued for three days. After the main eruption, lava flows continued and much of the fissure gave off strong fumarolic activity. On August 20, a team of scientists visited the area.

=== 2009 eruption ===
On 29 June another plume was detected from the same area. Imagery showed thermal abnormalities coming from Manda Hararo. A team of field scientists reached the site on 4 July and found the eruption had produced basaltic lava flows from fissures 4–5 kilometres (2.5–3.1 mi) long. The fissures were lined by scoria 'ramparts'. The eruption was possibly bigger than the 2007 eruption. By the time the scientists reached the fissure, it only emitted steam.
