= Alu (Ethiopia) =

Volcanic system in Ethiopia

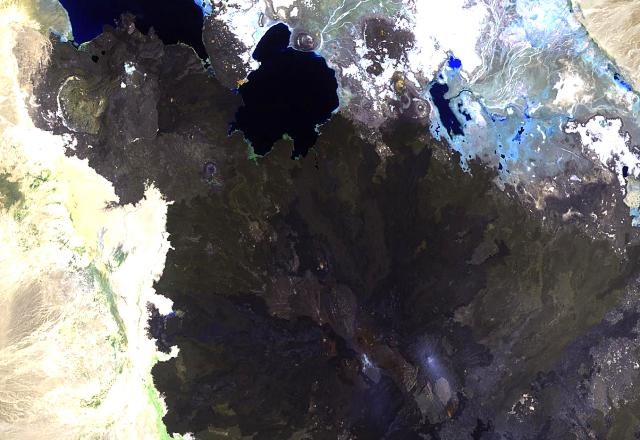

Highest point
- Elevation: 429 m (1,407 ft)
- Listing: List of volcanoes in Ethiopia
- Coordinates: 13°49′30″N 40°33′00″E

Geography
- Location within Ethiopia
- Location: Ethiopia

Geology
- Rock age: Holocene
- Mountain type: Fissure vents
- Last eruption: Unknown

Alu is a system of volcanic fissures, located in Ethiopia. The fissures have produced silicic lava flows, and other fissures south of the volcano have been the source of huge youthful basaltic lava flows, which enlarge to the north as far as Lake Bakili. There is major fumarolic activity, located on parallel faults, some with 100-m uplifts.
