= Udokan Plateau =

Volcanic field in Russia

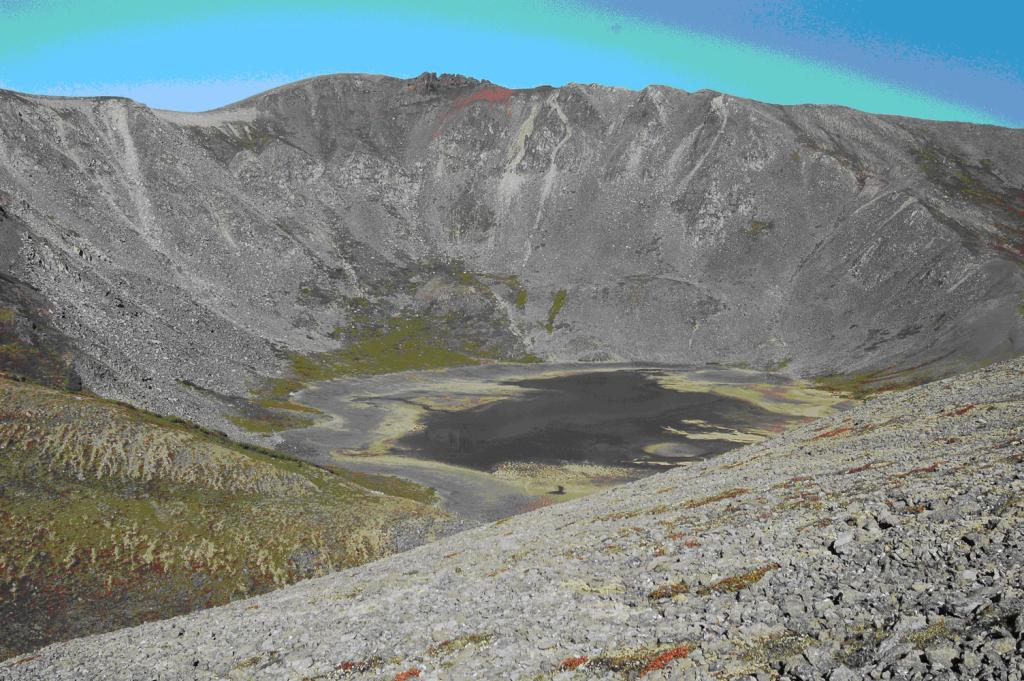
- Aku volcano

Highest point
- Elevation: 2,180 m (7,150 ft)
- Coordinates: 56°16′48″N 117°46′12″E

Geography
- Location within Russia

Geology
- Rock age: Miocene-Holocene
- Mountain type: Volcanic field
- Last eruption: 220 BCE

The Udokan Plateau is a volcanic field in Transbaikalia, Russia. It covers a surface area of 3,000 square kilometres (1,200 sq mi) northeast of Lake Baikal in North Asia. Volcanism in the Udokan Plateau included both basaltic lava flows and later individual volcanic cones. Volcanism commenced in the Miocene and continued on into the Holocene.

Volcanism in the field ranges from lava flows forming thick lava flow sequences formed out of basalt to explosive eruptions forming cinder cones accompanied by lava flows and ignimbrite eruptions during the late stages of volcanic activity. Volcanic activity commenced 14 million years ago and the youngest three radiocarbon dates indicate persistence of volcanic activity into the Holocene. Recent seismic activity has been reported.

== General geology ==
The Udokan Plateau lies 400 kilometres (250 mi) east-northeast of the eastern end of Lake Baikal in the Emnakh River watershed. It covers a surface area of 3,000 square kilometres (1,200 sq mi) within the Udokan range at altitudes of 1,500–2,000 metres (4,900–6,600 ft). The basement rock is of Precambrian age. The Udokan Plateau is one of several Cenozoic volcanic fields in the northeastern Baikal Rift Zone, and one of several Asian volcanic fields with Cenozoic activity. The other volcanic fields are Bartoy, Hamar-Daban and Vitim. These first two are the smallest fields. The Udokan Plateau formed over an older topography left by Jurassic orogeny and later updoming and erosion.

The Udokan Plateau is linked to the Sayan-Baykal uplift and more specifically to a place in the Chara rift where it widens. Collision of India and Eurasia may have initiated volcanism in the Sayan Baykal region including the Udokan Plateau. It is not certain however that volcanism was caused by the rifting in the case of the Udokan plateau. Much of the volcanic activity occurred before the rifting. Beneath the northern margin of the plateau, anomalies in the asthenosphere have been described. This plateau and the neighbouring Vitim plateau are underpinned by a low velocity low density anomaly. One theory states that variations in lithospheric thickness between the Baikal rift and the Siberian platform generate a convection current in the asthenosphere. Another theory links volcanism in the Udokan plateau and other volcanic fields in the territory to two mantle plumes. Isotope data suggest the presence of at least two mantle reservoirs beneath the Baikal rift.

Studies on rocks and mapping of geological features was performed during the 1960s to the 1980s. This research was later followed up by precision isotope and petrology research. The field has been noted because of the diversity of its volcanic features.

== Geological features ==
The plateau contains a sequence of trachyte-trachyandesite rocks which, easily recognizable by their colour, were already in 1967 identified and named the Amnanakachi sequence. Other stratified formations are also found there. Pleistocene-Holocene activity occurred along lineaments. Some lava flows are cut by the Imangra fault, leaving 10–15 metres (33–49 ft) high scarps. Volcanic activity occurred during four separate stages. Basaltic lava plateaus are up to 400–500 metres (1,300–1,600 ft) thick.

The oldest volcanoes of the complex are the Lurbun volcanoes, which form 11 centres in the northern part of the field. Lava flows and filled in craters are noticeable in the Lurbun group. These form the only occurrence of foidite in the field. After a period of dormancy, volcanism resumed in the southern part of the field during the late Miocene in the area of the Chukchudu-Yuzhni Sakukan rivers. With volumes of 200 cubic kilometres (48 cu mi) this volcanism is much more voluminous than the early foiditic phase. This volcanism mostly consists of lava flows and is subdivided into three suites, including the Nesmura and Amnanakachi sequences. Thick hyaloclastite layers are also found in some parts. Zapadnyi Sakukan is a central volcano of this episode. The composition has been described as basalt trachyte.

The Pliocene volcanism is the largest episode of volcanism, with volumes of 500 cubic kilometres (120 cu mi) and covering half of the surface of the whole plateau. The Amutychi sequence is subdivided into three suites, Kuas, Eimnakh and Oktokit from bottom to top. The first two sequences do not appear uniformly over the whole plateau. Most lava flows of this volcanism phase are 20–30 metres (66–98 ft) thick and are associated with dolerite sills. A later Pliocene episode formed the Turuktak sequence, with a total volume of 40 cubic kilometres (9.6 cu mi) and again three suites named Dagaldyn, Inarichi and Issakachan. The Vakat volcano is a central volcano which has been assigned to this phase. These two phases are described as trachyte-basaltic to basaltic.

The middle Pleistocene featured a change of activity away from fissure eruptions to central vent eruptions. The Vakat group consists of basaltic volcanoes including subvolcanic dykes and sills erupted during the Quaternary. About a hundred of central-like volcanoes and 50 other volcanoes including dykes, extrusions and stocks are part of this phase of volcanism. Activity during this volcanic phase was strombolian in nature with short lava flows and small pyroclastic eruptions. The Vakat cones are constructed along the Imangra fault; other volcanoes likewise are frequently aligned suggesting fault controlled eruption. The composition of this group is basaltic.

The last two volcanic phases are known as Aku and Syni volcanic phase. The first commenced after a period of dormancy and generated mainly four volcanoes, Inarichi, Turuktak, Kislyi Klyuch and Ust-Khangura the first three of which form a volcanic line. All of them have erupted lava flows up to 10 kilometres (6.2 mi) long. Inarichi is the largest volcano in the Udokan plateau and includes a major trachyte caldera. The last two volcanoes are heavily eroded to the point that Ust-Khangura only contains three necks. The Syni phase is to some degree a continuation of the Aku one; the Chepe volcano is aligned with Ust-Khangura and other volcanoes are aligned with the first three Aku volcanoes. These five volcanoes are named Trakhitovyi, Verkhnyaya Syni, Aku, Dolinnyi and Chepe. These volcanoes had pyroclastic eruptions which occasionally formed ignimbrites. The Syni volcano has two craters and has formed lava flows. Syni erupted basaltic lavas and Aku, Chepe and Dolinny trachyte.

== Petrology ==
Rocks erupted in the field include alkali basalt, basalt, basanite, foidite, hawaiite, phonolite, tephriphonolite, trachyandesite, trachybasalt. Hyaloclastites are also found, as well as dolerites in the late Miocene rocks. Pumice has been reported from the Pleistocene-Holocene ages. The dominant rocks are basalts but trachyte is also found in maars and ignimbrites. Trachyte lava domes with heights of 400 metres (1,300 ft) and diameters of 1.5 kilometres (0.93 mi) are also found. Altered xenoliths are also found in the system. Pumice from the Udokan Plateau has been found in archaeological sites; they were brought there either by people or by glaciers.

Rocks from this volcanic field are generally rich in sodium and silica and their content has increased during the evolution of the volcanic field. Some of the oldest erupted rocks on the other hand had high potassium-sodium ratios. Benmoreite, nephelinites, pantellerites and kulaite are found here. Some of the magmatic differentiation may have occurred in closed magma chambers. Udokan is the only volcanic field in the Baikal rift with silicic differentiation of its rocks. The magma generation changed during the lifespan of the system, either it became deeper or was formed by smaller degrees of partial melting.

== Geological history ==
Ages reported in the field include 14 mya for Pravyi and Nizhnii Lurbun volcano and extrusion respectively, 9.85–9.6 mya for the Chukchudu series of lava flows and 8.95–6.85 mya for more central volcano structures, 9.6–9.35 mya for the Amnanakachi sequence, 9.35–8.4 mya for the Nesmura suite, 5.6–4.0 mya for the Kuas sequence, 4.0–3.38 mya for the Eimnakh sequence, 4.6–2.57 mya for the Amutychi central volcanoes and subvolcanic structures, 3.32–2.50 mya for the Oktokit sequence, 2.5 mya for the Verkhnii Ingamakit lava flow, 2.5–1.8 mya for the Turuktak sequence and its subdivisions, 1.8 mya for Kislyi Klyuch volcano and 1.8–0.73 mya for the Vakat volcanoes. Pumices have been dated to 3.30 ± 0.12, 2.63 ± 0.11 and 2.63 ± 0.11 million years ago. During the Pleistocene-Holocene two sequences were formed, the Aku sequence (260,000–40,000 BP) and the Syni sequence (12,050–2,100 BP).

Radiocarbon dating on charcoal and plant fossils buried beneath volcanic rocks has found evidence that activity continued in the Holocene; Dolinnyi volcano was active 7940 ± 100 BP, Aku volcano 4620 ± 100 BP and pumices erupted from Chepe have indicated ages of 2230 ± 40 and 2100 ± 80 BP. Seismic activity was recorded at depths of 15–20 kilometres (9.3–12.4 mi) beneath Vekhne-Ingamakitsky II volcano and at depths of 25 kilometres (16 mi) beneath Sini volcano. There are reports of hot springs.

== Selected cones ==
- Aku, 1,980 metres (6,500 ft) high, 56°10′23″N 117°28′0″E The volcano is a somma volcano with a height of 220 metres (720 ft).
- Chepe, 1,769 metres (5,804 ft) high, 56°11′42″N 117°33′32″E The volcano is a 380 metres (1,250 ft) high cone with a crater.
- Dolinnyi, 1,800 metres (5,900 ft) high, 56°10′59″N 117°29′38″E
- Sini, 1,705 metres (5,594 ft) high, 56°11′56″N 117°19′41″E A fissure vent with a 250 metres (820 ft) high central vent.

== Links ==
- Demonterova, Elena I.; Tetenkin, Alexey V.; Ivanov, Alexey V.; Lebedev, Vladimir A.; Shergin, Dmitrii L.; Pashkova, Galina V. (June 2024). "Provenance of the pumice manuports from archaeological sites at the Vitim River, East Siberia, Russia". Archaeological Research in Asia. 38 100513. doi:10.1016/j.ara.2024.100513.
- Grachev, A. F. (2015). "Compositional heterogeneity of the continental mantle: Evidence from ultramafic xenoliths in cenozoic basalts from Northern Eurasia" (PDF). Russian Journal of Earth Sciences. 15 (1): 1–13. doi:10.2205/2015ES000546. ISSN 1681-1208.
- Logatchev, Nicolai A. (1993). "History and geodynamics of the Lake Baikal Rift in the context of the Eastern Siberia Rift System: a review" (PDF). Bull. Centres Rech. Explor.-Prod. Elf Aquitaine. 17 (2): 353–370.
- Hasenaka, Toshiaki; Litasov, Yury D.; Taniguchi, Hiromitsu; Miyamoto, Tsuyoshi; Fujimaki, Hirokazu (1999-03-01). "Cenozoic Volcanism in Siberia: A review". Northeast Asian Studies. 3: 249–272. ISSN 1343-9332.
- Litasov, KD; Ivanov, AV; Litasov, YD (1997-01-01). "Depletion-enrichment of lithospheric mantle and mantle plume regime: evidence from deep-seated xenoliths in the Vitim and Udokan volcanic fields (Transbaikalia, Russia)" (PDF). Journal of Geosciences. 42 (3). ISSN 1802-6222.
