= Mount Furi =

Stratovolcano in Ethiopia

Mount Furi (also simply Furi) is a stratovolcano near Addis Ababa, Ethiopia. Located in the south eastern outskirt of Addis Ababa, this mountain has a latitude and longitude of 8°54′N 38°41′E and an altitude of 2,839 metres (9,314 ft).

Mount Furi is on the approach path to Bole International Airport. In 2003, a British Mediterranean Airways flight to Addis Ababa avoided the peak by 50 feet.

== See also ==
- List of volcanoes in Ethiopia
- List of stratovolcanoes
