= Pantellerite =

Peralkaline rhyolite type of volcanic rock

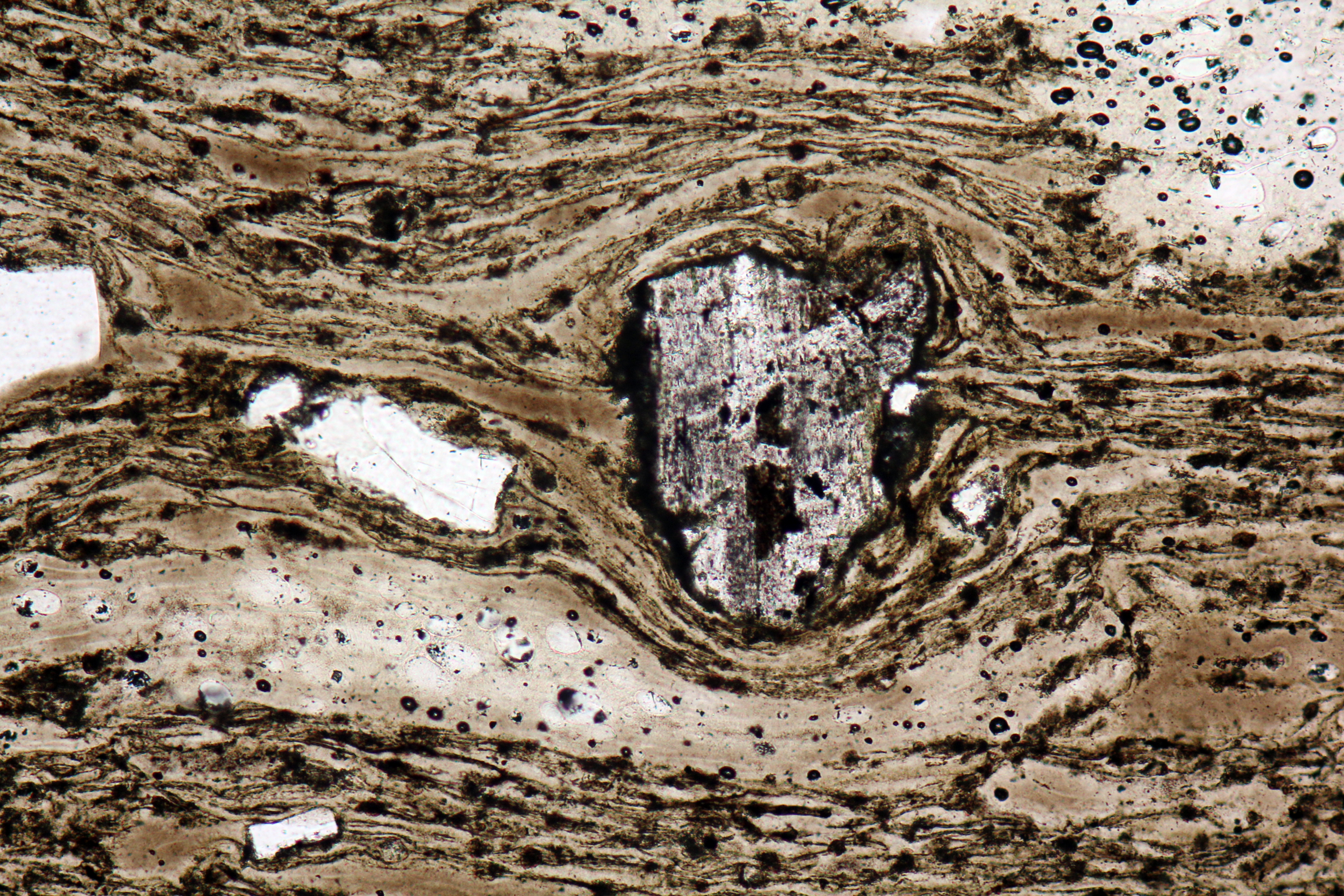
Thin section of ignimbrite of pantelleritic composition from Pantelleria, Italy

Pantellerite is a type of volcanic rock, specifically a peralkaline rhyolite. It has a higher iron and lower aluminium composition than comendite. It is named after Pantelleria, a volcanic island in the Strait of Sicily and the type location for this rock. On Pantelleria the rock is usually found as a vitrophyre containing phenocrysts of anorthoclase or sanidine. Quartz is found only in the most strongly peralkaline rocks. Mafic minerals may include aegirine, fayalite, aenigmatite, ilmenite, and sodic amphibole (often arfvedsonite or ferrorichterite).

== Occurrence ==
North America

- Mount Edziza volcanic complex, northwestern British Columbia, Canada
- Ilgachuz Range, west-central British Columbia, Canada
- La Reforma, Baja California Peninsula, Mexico
- Level Mountain, northwestern British Columbia, Canada

Antarctica

- Mount Berlin, Marie Byrd Land
- Mount Moulton, Marie Byrd Land
- Mount Noice, Victoria Land

Asia

- Udokan Plateau, Russia

Africa

- Dabbahu Volcano, Afar Region, Ethiopia
- Ma Alalta, Afar Region, Ethiopia
- Tat Ali, Afar Region, Ethiopia
