= Outcast Hill =

Volcanic hill in British Columbia, Canada

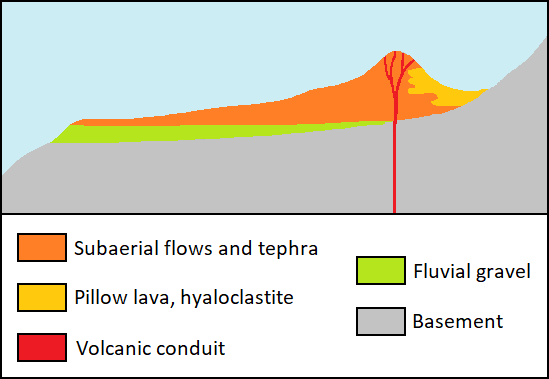
- Cross section of Outcast Hill

Highest point
- Elevation: 1,800 m (5,900 ft)
- Coordinates: 57°23′24.0″N 130°46′27.0″W

Geography
- Location within British Columbia
- Interactive map of Outcast Hill
- Location: British Columbia, Canada
- District: Cassiar Land District
- Parent range: Tahltan Highland
- Topo map: NTS 104G7 Mess Lake

Geology
- Rock age: Pleistocene
- Mountain type: Cinder cone
- Volcanic zone: Northern Cordilleran Volcanic Province
- Last eruption: Pleistocene

Outcast Hill is an isolated hill in northern British Columbia, Canada, located southeast of Mess Lake. It lies at the southern end of Mount Edziza Provincial Park.

== History ==
Outcast Hill was named on 2 January 1980 by the Geological Survey of Canada after the Wetalth people, a group of people who lived here in times past, outcast or exiled from the Tahltans.

== Geology ==
Outcast Hill is a volcanic feature associated with the Spectrum Range volcanic complex which in turn form part of the Northern Cordilleran Volcanic Province. It is a cinder cone that formed in the Pleistocene period.

== See also ==
- List of volcanoes in Canada
- List of Northern Cordilleran volcanoes
- Volcanism of Canada
- Volcanism of Western Canada
