= Tadekho Hill =

Hill in British Columbia, Canada

- Location within British Columbia
- Interactive map of Tadekho Hill

Highest point
- Elevation: 1,876 m (6,155 ft)
- Prominence: 231 m (758 ft)
- Coordinates: 57°21′01.0″N 130°47′07.0″W

Geography
- Location: British Columbia, Canada
- District: Cassiar Land District
- Parent range: Tahltan Highland
- Topo map: NTS 104G7 Mess Lake

Geology
- Rock age: Pleistocene
- Mountain type: Subglacial mound
- Volcanic zone: Northern Cordilleran Volcanic Province
- Last eruption: Pleistocene

Tadekho Hill is an isolated hill in the Northern Interior of British Columbia, Canada, located 64 km (40 mi) southwest of Tatogga and 10 km (6 mi) southwest of Kitsu Peak. It lies at the southwestern end of Mount Edziza Provincial Park.

== History ==
Tadekho Hill was named on 2 January 1980 by the Geological Survey of Canada in association with Tadekho Creek.

== Geology ==
Tadekho Hill is a volcanic feature associated with the Spectrum Range volcanic complex which in turn form part of the Northern Cordilleran Volcanic Province. It is a subglacial mound that formed in the Pleistocene period.

== See also ==
- List of volcanoes in Canada
- List of Northern Cordilleran volcanoes
- Volcanism of Canada
- Volcanism of Western Canada
