= List of subglacial volcanoes =

Subglacial volcanoes are volcanoes located beneath glaciers or ice sheets. They are somewhat rare worldwide, being confined to regions that are or were covered by continental ice sheets.

== Antarctica ==
- Brown Bluff
- Gaussberg

== Argentina ==
- Viedma

== Canada ==
- Ash Mountain
- Mount Brew
- Caribou Tuya
- Cauldron Dome
- Chakatah Creek Peak
- Dark Mountain
- Dome Mountain
- Ember Ridge
- Enid Creek Cone
- Gage Hill
- Hoodoo Mountain
- Hyalo Ridge
- Isspah Butte
- Mount Josephine
- Kawdy Mountain
- King Creek Cone
- Klinkit Creek Peak
- Klinkit Lake Peak
- Little Bear Mountain
- Little Eagle Cone
- Little Ring Mountain
- Mathews Tuya
- McLeod Hill
- Meehaz Mountain
- Mosquito Mound
- Nuthinaw Mountain
- Pillow Ridge
- Pyramid Mountain
- Ray Mountain
- Ring Mountain
- South Tuya
- Spanish Mump
- Tennena Cone
- The Table
- Tom MacKay Creek Cone
- Toozaza Peak
- Tsekone Ridge
- Tutsingale Mountain
- Tuya Butte
- Watts Point volcanic centre
- Wetalth Ridge

== Chile ==
- Lautaro

== Iceland ==
- Bárðarbunga
- Búrfell
- Grímsvötn
- Helgafell
- Herðubreið
- Hlöðufell
- Hofsjökull
- Hveravellir
- Katla
- Keilir
- Kverkfjöll
- Loki-Fögrufjöll
- Prestahnúkur
- Snæfellsjökull
- Stóra-Björnsfell
- Torfajökull
- Tungnafellsjökull
- Vífilsfell
- Þórdarhyrna
- Þórolfsfell

== United States ==
- Crazy Hills
- Hayrick Butte
- Hogg Rock
- Lone Butte
- Togiak Tuya

== See also ==
- List of shield volcanoes
- List of stratovolcanoes
