= Volcanic history of the Northern Cordilleran Volcanic Province =

Geologic region in British Columbia and Yukon, Canada

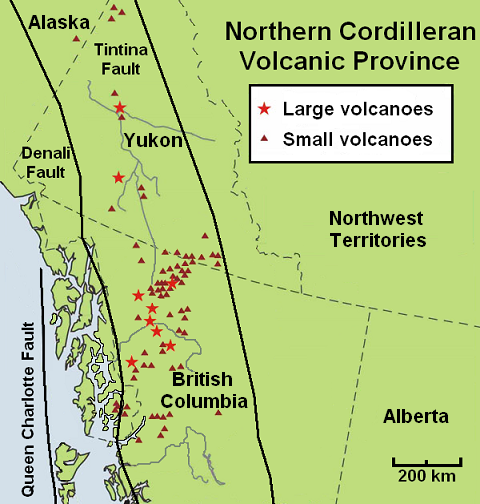
Minor and major volcanoes of the Northern Cordilleran Volcanic Province, including the Queen Charlotte, Denali and Tintina fault zones

The volcanic history of the Northern Cordilleran Volcanic Province presents a record of volcanic activity in northwestern British Columbia, central Yukon and the U.S. state of easternmost Alaska. The volcanic activity lies in the northern part of the Western Cordillera of the Pacific Northwest region of North America. Extensional cracking of the North American Plate in this part of North America has existed for millions of years. Continuation of this continental rifting has fed scores of volcanoes throughout the Northern Cordilleran Volcanic Province over at least the past 20 million years (see Geology of the Pacific Northwest) and occasionally continued into geologically recent times.

Eruptive activity in the Northern Cordilleran Volcanic Province throughout its 20 million year history has been mainly the production of alkaline lavas, including alkaline basalts. A range of alkaline rock types not commonly found in the Western Cordillera are regionally widespread in the Northern Cordilleran Volcanic Province. These include nephelinite, basanite and peralkaline phonolite, trachyte and comendite lavas. The trachyte and comendite lavas are understood to have been created by fractionation of mainly alkali basalt magma in crustal reservoirs. An area of continental rifting, such as the Northern Cordilleran Volcanic Province, would aid the formation of high-level reservoirs of capable size and thermal activity to maintain long-lived fractionation.

In the past 15 million years, at least four large volcanoes have formed their way through dense igneous and metamorphic composed bedrock of this part of North America. This includes Hoodoo Mountain, the Mount Edziza volcanic complex, Level Mountain and Heart Peaks, which are primarily located in northwestern British Columbia. Most notable of these is the 7.5 million year old Mount Edziza volcanic complex, which has had more than 20 eruptions in the past 10,000 years. The only activity present in the Northern Cordilleran Volcanic Province has been occasional earthquakes and constant boiling of hot springs. However, a high potential exists for renewed eruptive activity that could threaten life and property in the volcanic zone.

== Production and rates in volcanism ==
More than 100 eruptions have occurred in the past 20 million years with a broad range of eruptive styles. These volcanic processes have created a range of different volcanic landforms, including stratovolcanoes, shield volcanoes, lava domes and cinder cones, along with a few isolated examples of rarer volcanic forms such as tuyas. Large persistent volcanoes of the Northern Cordilleran Volcanic Province can remain dormant for hundreds or thousands of years between eruptions and therefore the greatest risk caused by volcanic activity is not always readily apparent. Volcanics older than 14 million years are mainly found in the northern portion of the volcanic province while volcanics ranging from nine to four million years old exist only in the middle of the volcanic province. At least three types of volcanic zones are present in the Northern Cordilleran Volcanic Province, including large persistent lava plateaus like those found at the Mount Edziza volcanic complex, polygenetic volcanoes such as Hoodoo Mountain and monogenetic volcanoes like the basaltic cinder cones found throughout the volcanic province. When Northern Cordilleran volcanoes do erupt, pyroclastic flows, lava flows and landslides can devastate areas 10 km (6.2 mi) away and mudflows of volcanic ash and debris can inundate valleys 10 km (6.2 mi) downstream. Falling ash from explosive eruptions can disrupt human activities hundreds of kilometres downwind, and drifting clouds of fine volcanic ash can cause severe damage to jet aircraft even hundreds of kilometres away. Volcanic deposits in the Northern Cordilleran Volcanic Province include lava flows, welded and unwelded pyroclastic deposits, hydroclastic deposits and other ice-contact volcanic deposits. The variety of different volcanic deposits is partly due to changes in eruption characteristics from mainly subaerial eruptions to broadly subglacial eruptions throughout the history of the Northern Cordilleran Volcanic Province.

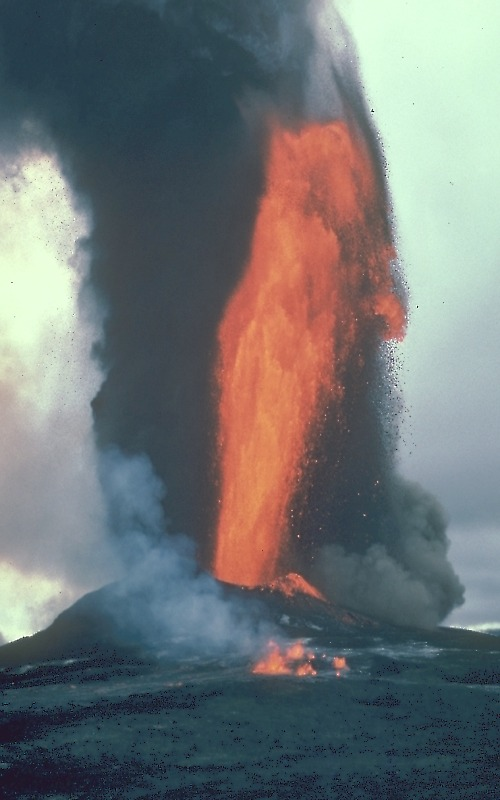
Lava fountains like those associated with Kīlauea in Hawaii are a common eruption style in the Northern Cordilleran Volcanic Province.

There is evidence of a decline in volcanic activity over the past few million years. This decline in volcanic activity can be grouped into two phases. From eight to four million years ago, volcanism rates were higher than they are at present. Magma production during this volcanic phase was most active from seven to five million years ago and was related to a period of rifting along the Pacific and North American Plate boundary. Between four and three million years ago in the Pliocene epoch, a pause in volcanic activity began to happen. The most recent magmatic phase ranging from two million years ago to present resulted from nearby areas of rifting during a period of compression between the Pacific and North American plates. Volcanism rates during this volcanic phase was most active from two to one million years ago with the construction of 25 volcanic zones then decreased one million years ago with the construction of 11 volcanic zones. To date, the most recent volcanic phase has produced 100 km^{3} (24 mi^{3}) of volcanic material whereas the first phase produced 250 km^{3} (60 mi^{3}) of volcanic material. Even though the rate in volcanism throughout the Northern Cordilleran Volcanic Province has changed considerably, there is no correlation between the rate in magma production and the number of active volcanoes during any interval of time. The present day volcanism rate for the Northern Cordilleran Volcanic Province is considerably lower than the Cascade Volcanic Arc and Hawaiian volcanism rates. However, geologists are aware the temporal volcanic patterns known for the Northern Cordilleran Volcanic Province should be looked at carefully because volcanics that pre-date the last glacial period have been eroded by glacial ice and many of the volcanics have not been directly dated or have not been dated in significant detail to identify more individual temporal patterns. Lava fountains can occur in the Northern Cordilleran Volcanic Province roughly every 100 years.

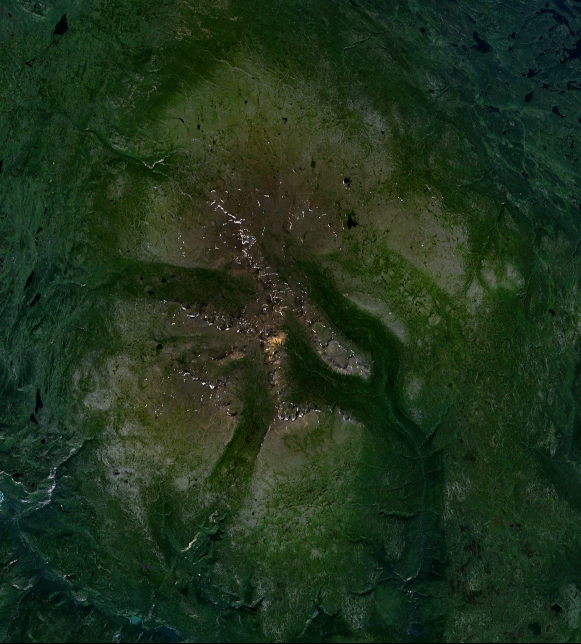
Level Mountain, the largest volcano of the Northern Cordilleran Volcanic Province. The large brown area in the middle is a dissected stratovolcano and the surrounding light brown is the broad shield volcano comprising a lava plateau.

Large basaltic shield volcanoes throughout the central Northern Cordilleran Volcanic Province form large lava plateaus and are the largest volcanoes of the volcanic zone. These extensive volcanoes are generally larger and more long-lived than volcanoes of adjacent volcanic zones, including the stratovolcanoes of the Cascade and Aleutian arcs. Mount Shasta, the largest stratovolcano in the Cascade Arc and Mount Veniaminof, one of the largest and most active volcanoes in the Aleutian Arc, have volumes of at least 350 km^{3} (84 mi^{3}), less than half of that of the Level Mountain and Edziza shield complexes. The massive Level Mountain shield, occupying an area of 1,800 km^{2} (690 mi^{2}) and a volume of more than 860 km^{3} (210 mi^{3}), is the most voluminous and most long-lived volcano of the Northern Cordilleran Volcanic Province. Further south, the Mount Edziza volcanic complex resides as the seconed most voluminous volcano with an area of 1,000 km^{2} (390 mi^{2}) and a volume of 670 km^{3} (160 mi^{3}). Just west of Level Mountain lies Heart Peaks, the third most voluminous volcano of the Northern Cordilleran Volcanic Province with an area of 275 km^{2} (106 mi^{2}). However, remains of a shield volcano that once covered an area of more than 900 km^{2} (350 mi^{2}) are present in the western Cassiar Mountains as Maitland Volcano.

All of the known most recent eruptions have occurred in British Columbia, although there is evidence for volcanic activity in Yukon in the past thousand years. The two most recent were lava flow eruptions at Tseax Cone in the 18th century and at The Volcano in 1904. Reports of an eruption 80 km (50 mi) south of Gladys Lake in northern British Columbia were made by placer miners at the end of the 19th century, but no evidence for this eruption has been found, leading researchers to speculate the eruption as uncertain.

== Volcanic activity begins ==
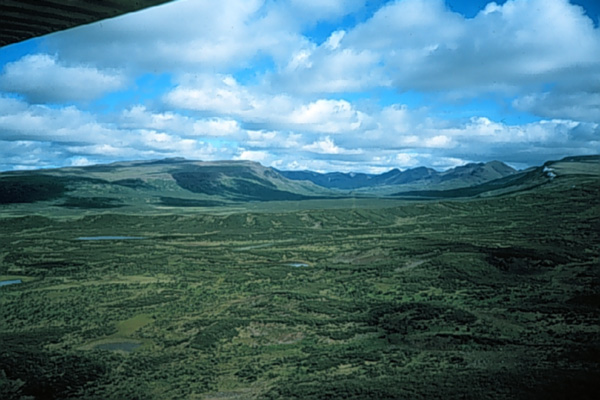
Level Mountain with extensive elevated plateau in the foreground

The first volcanic activity in the Northern Cordilleran Volcanic Province 20 million years ago was infrequent, creating small amounts of volcanic material. This infrequent volcanic activity was interrupted when considerable volcanism began to form the large Level Mountain shield volcano 15 million years ago. The 1,800 km^{2} (690 mi^{2}) shield volcano forms a broad cliff-bounded lava plateau 70 km (43 mi) long and 45 km (28 mi) wide, with an average thickness of 750 m (2,460 ft). Ropy pāhoehoe lava flows predominate over blocky ʻaʻā lava flows, breccias and tuffs, attesting to a fluid and effusive character for the volcanism.

When the Mount Edziza volcanic complex began to form 7.5 million years ago, volcanism rates in the Northern Cordilleran Volcanic Province increased again. Early volcanic activity of the Mount Edziza volcanic complex seven million years ago constructed Armadillo Peak, the oldest and most central of the four central volcanoes comprising the complex. Its 2,194 m (7,198 ft) summit is capped by 180 m (590 ft) thick fine-grained silica-rich trachyte lava flows that ponded inside the caldera to produce a lava lake six million years ago during its final stage of activity. A massive stratovolcano was also formed on top of the Level Mountain shield volcano 7.1 to 5.3 million years ago during this increased period of volcanism when viscous peralkaline trachyte and comendite lavas were erupted. The stratovolcano has a volume of 860 km^{3} (210 mi^{3}) and comprises several volcanic vents, some of which were formally more than 2,500 m (8,200 ft) in elevation. Glacial ice and streams have since dissected the stratovolcano into a series of valleys with intervening ridges, forming the so-named Level Mountain Range on the central summit of Level Mountain.

More Miocene age volcanics of 27.5 ± 4.3 and 16.2 ± 2 million years are present at the Anderson and Moose bays of Atlin Lake in northern British Columbia that represent remnants of columnar-jointed basalt lava flows. This indicates these volcanics are older than the Edziza and Level Mountain shields and they might represent the oldest volcanic events in the Northern Cordilleran Volcanic Province. However, their distinctive chemical characteristics and apparent large age differences compared to other volcanics in the Atlin area could also indicate that these columnar-jointed basalt lava flows are not part of the Northern Cordilleran Volcanic Province assemblage. In northern Yukon, similar aged volcanics can be found, including 19.9 ± 0.5 million year old volcanics at Forty Mile and 17.2 ± 0.3 million year old volcanics at Sixty Mile. However, the type of volcanic landforms these volcanics represent are unknown.

== Volcanism 5.3 to 1.6 million years ago ==
In northern British Columbia, remnants of a shield volcano are found throughout the western Cassiar Mountains. This prehistoric shield volcano, known as Maitland Volcano, was erupted from five to four million years ago on a mature eroded surface as thin hawaiite and basaltic lava flows engulfed the surrounding landscape. Remnants of this prehistoric shield volcano include a cluster of 14 volcanic plugs and scattered cliff-bounded basaltic lava flows.

At the southern end of the Mount Edziza volcanic complex, volcanism constructed the Spectrum Range three to 2.5 million years ago. Named for its extensive colouration, this nearly circular lava dome is up to 650 m (2,130 ft) thick and more than 10 km (6.2 mi) wide with a basaltic shield volcano forming its broad base. Since its formation, the Spectrum Range lava dome has been deeply cut by erosion, forming an extensive valley system. This valley system exposes large comendite and trachyte lava flows of the dome, including faults of a hidden 4.5 km (2.8 mi) wide caldera.

A series of lava domes were constructed in the Level Mountain Range alpine valley system 4.5 to 2.5 million years ago. These domes intrude the glacially eroded core of the 860 km^{3} (210 mi^{3}) stratovolcano and headward erosion has further modified the Level Mountain shield by incising youthful V-shaped stream canyons into the lava plateau margin.

== Volcanism 1.6 million to 10,000 years ago ==
Throughout the Pleistocene epoch 1.6 million to 10,000 years ago, volcanism in the Northern Cordilleran Volcanic Province was broadly associated with glacial ice and ice sheets during glacial periods, including the large Cordilleran Ice Sheet. This volcano-ice association can be recognized in three different physiographic settings, each displaying unique relationships between topography, volcanism and glacial ice. The first volcano-ice interaction is displayed as tuyas, including Tuya Butte, on the Tanzilla Plateau in the Northern Interior of British Columbia. This sub-section of the Stikine Plateau consists of large flatlands with hills of low relief, and might have been one of the areas of ice accumulation for the Cordilleran Ice Sheet. Tanzilla Plateau volcanism throughout the Pleistocene epoch was basaltic subglacial eruptions. The most generally known subglacial volcanoes are distinctive tuyas, which commonly reach more than 100 m (330 ft) in elevation. Other volcanic forms also exist, some of which are basic and others that are probably the products of weathering. The subdued relief on the Tanzilla Plateau strongly influenced edifice morphologies, favoring broad-based tuyas. The hydrological conditions in these areas likely were controlled by relatively uniform ice thickness and gentle topography.

The seconed type of volcano-ice interaction is located only to the east, south and southwest of the Tanzilla Plateau, in the Cassiar Mountains, Skeena Mountains and in the Boundary Ranges. Volcanic activity in these locations is also largely mafic in composition, but the extensive elevations of these areas had a much more impressive influence on glaciation and subglacial volcanism. High altitude glaciation took over when the Cordilleran Ice Sheet was not present and even when buried by the Cordilleran Ice Sheet, basal ice movement was strongly influenced by the deep, pre-glacial drainages. Accordingly, the erosional remnants of subglacial volcanoes are minor and intermittent. In the Skeena Mountains, separated outcrops of pillow lava and volcanic breccia are generally found side by side on the summits of sharp rugged mountain ridges, with presumably temporally-associated pyroclastic rocks having collected downslope.

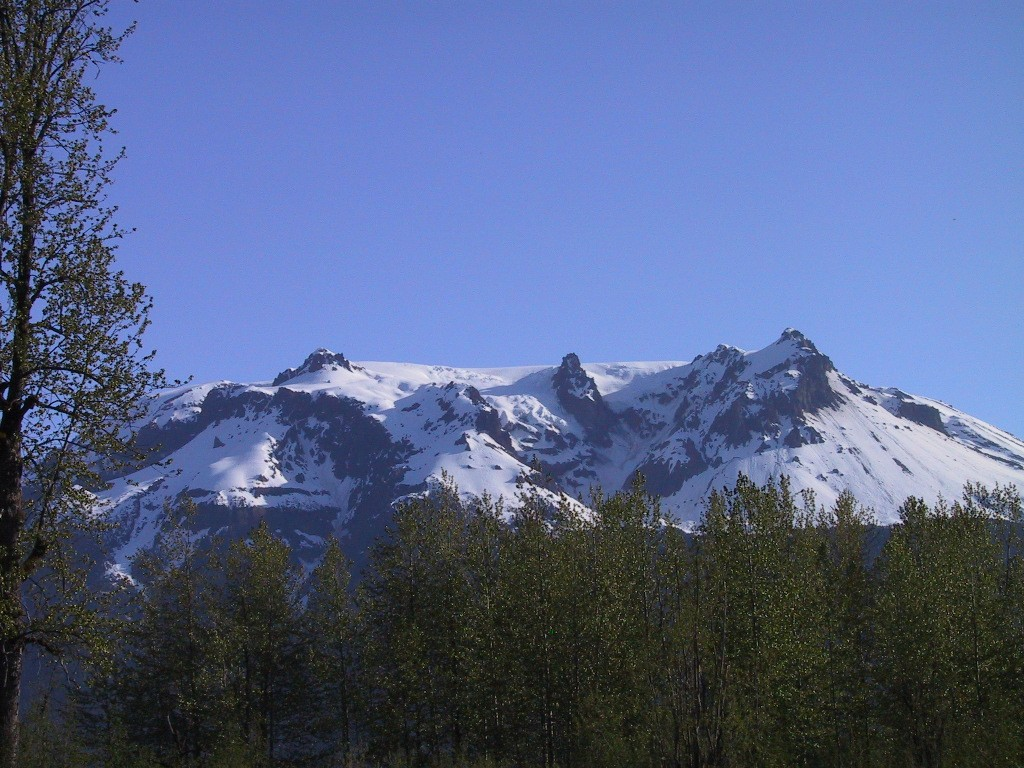
Hoodoo Mountain in the Boundary Ranges of the Coast Mountains, whose flat-topped summit likely originated from frequent interactions between volcanic activity and ice of the Cordilleran Ice Sheet

The third type of volcano-ice interaction is geographically restricted to three volcanoes, including Level Mountain, the Mount Edziza volcanic complex and Hoodoo Mountain. All three volcanoes are broad enough to hold ice caps that likely altered regional ice flow while still being altered by the Cordilleran Ice Sheet at individual periods. The Mount Edziza and Level Mountain complexes have shelves of older lava with elevations more than 1 km (0.62 mi) and have been zones of volcanic activity long enough that their geothermal activities might have had effects on movements of the Cordilleran Ice Sheet much like the Grímsvötn caldera in Iceland, which has been a significant heat source beneath the vast Vatnajökull icecap. At the Edziza complex, most of the subglacial products were formed on top of the main lava plateau, which now rises at least 1,000 m (3,300 ft) in elevation above adjacent stream valleys. The Edziza complex consists of a collection of mafic subglacial products, but more unusually, including Hoodoo Mountain and Level Mountain, comprises some of the largest deposits of peralkaline felsic subglacial volcanics known. At the Edziza and Level Mountain complexes, glacier hydrology of the Cordilleran Ice Sheet was possibly dominated by a complicated interaction between drainage on the flat plateaus under relatively thinner ice and drainage within nearby steep valleys filled with much thicker ice.

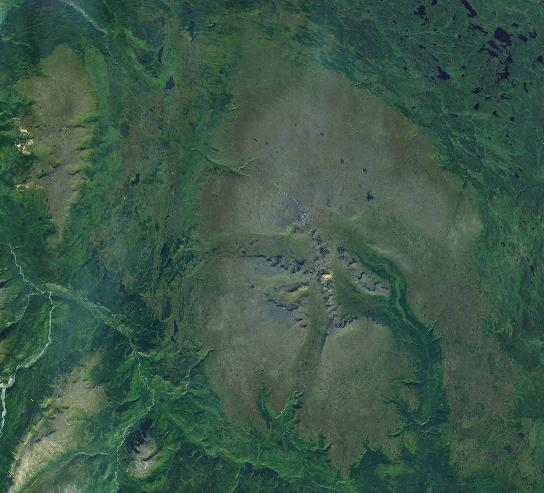
Heart Peaks in the upper-left corner and the central and largest, is the treeless plateau of the Level Mountain shield volcano whose stratovolcano and domes are etched out by a light snowfall. Intermontane lowland lakes are shown as irregular dark blue patches.

Just northwest of Level Mountain, the Heart Peaks shield volcano rises with a topographic prominence of 1,025 m (3,363 ft) above the Nahlin Plateau with rhyolitic lava domes capping its summit. Heart Peaks is made of flat-lying basaltic and trachybasaltic lava flows and pyroclastic rocks. The most recent eruption at the shield is of dominantly Pleistocene age and late-stage Holocene activity is uncertain.

On the divide between the head of the Omineca and Bear rivers, The Thumb rises with a topographic prominence of 180 m (590 ft) above gently sloping benchland near the crest of the Connelly Range. It is the largest among a cluster of seven steep-sided volcanic plugs associated with dikes, lava flows and remnants of cinder cones.

Ne Ch'e Ddhawa, an extinct volcano in the Fort Selkirk Volcanic Field of central Yukon, reaches a height of 300 m (980 ft) near the junction of the Pelly and Yukon rivers. It was erupted subglacially under the Cordilleran Ice Sheet between 0.8 and one million years ago, depositing hyaloclastite tuffs, breccias and pillow breccias that now form the volcano.

In the Boundary Ranges of northwestern British Columbia, Hoodoo Mountain began its formation at least 100,000 years ago mostly under glacial ice of the Cordilleran Ice Sheet. More than 90% of Hoodoo Mountain was formed during this eruptive period and interlayed peralkaline phonolitic and trachytic lava flows and hyaloclastites are the main volcanics comprising the volcano. On the northern flank of Hoodoo Mountain lies the smaller Little Bear Mountain, a tuya which also formed in the Pleistocene epoch.

Ice Peak, which overlaps the northern flank of Armadillo Peak, began to form when the regional Cordilleran Ice Sheet began retreating from the Mount Edziza volcanic complex 1,600,000 years ago. It is a stratovolcano that was constructed when large areas of the Edziza lava plateau were free from glacial ice, but additional parts of the Mount Edziza volcanic complex were likely still covered by glacial ice. Volcanic activity at Ice Peak during this period produced lava flows and pyroclastic rocks, which mixed with meltwater to produce debris flows. As Ice Peak began to form, basic lava spread to the flanks of Ice Peak where it formed meltwater lakes and combines with and forms part of the adjacent shield volcano. Mount Edziza, a steep-sided stratovolcano overlapping the northern flank of Ice Peak and the most northerly of the four central volcanoes comprising the Mount Edziza volcanic complex, began to form a million years ago when the Cordilleran Ice Sheet retreated from the upper flanks of the Edziza lava plateau. Its smooth northern and western flanks are only slightly channeled by erosion and they curve up to a circular 2,700 m (8,900 ft) summit ridge which surrounds a central ice-filled caldera 2 km (1.2 mi) in diameter. Active cirques on Edziza's eastern flank have breached the caldera rim, exposing the remnants of several lava lakes that ponded in the caldera 900,000 years ago. As well, subglacial eruptions around the flanks of Mount Edziza and Ice Peak constructed piles of pillow lava and hyaloclastite.

Prindle Volcano, the northernmost volcano of the Northern Cordilleran Volcanic Province and one of the most isolated volcanoes in Alaska, was formed on the Yukon-Tanana upland during the Pleistocene epoch. It is a small cinder cone made of basanite with a 90 m (300 ft) deep breached volcanic crater at its summit. Extending from Prindle's breached volcanic crater is a 11.2 km (7.0 mi) long basanite lava flow that flowed southeast of the cone then flowed southwest into a river valley.

The Cassiar Mountains and Tanzilla Plateau in northern British Columbia are dominated by tuyas of the broad Tuya Volcanic Field. These flat-topped, steep-sided subglacial volcanoes were formed when magma intruded into and melted a vertical pipe in the overlying Cordilleran Ice Sheet. At least six volcanoes formed beneath glacial ice close to Tuya Lake, including Ash Mountain, South Tuya, Tuya Butte, Mathews Tuya. Ash Mountain at the head of Parallel Creek consists of pillow lava and hyaloclastite, South Tuya consists of loose volcanic debris with basaltic dikes intruding into the volcano and Tuya Butte and Mathews Tuya consist of pillow lava and hyaloclastite on its lower flanks with subaerially erupted lava flows at their flat-topped summits.

== Volcanism in the past 10,000 years ==
Numerous eruptions have occurred since the beginning of the Holocene epoch 10,000 years ago, when the vast Cordilleran Ice Sheet retreated rapidly at the end of the last glacial period. The majority of volcanic eruptions throughout the Holocene have occurred in British Columbia while fewer Holocene eruptions have occurred in Yukon.

In the early Holocene epoch, volcanism at Hoodoo Mountain produced lava flows with well-preserved lava channels on its northwestern and southwestern flanks and are largely unglaciated, suggesting the last eruptive activity at Hoodoo Mountain occurred in an ice-free environment. These lava flows originated from the mountain's flat-topped summit and volcanic vents on its flanks. Geologists do not always agree on the dates of these more recent eruptions, some dating them to nice thousand years ago, others to as recently as seven thousand years ago.

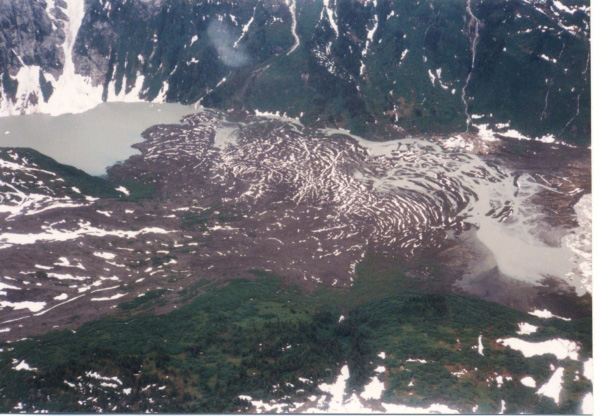
Recently erupted pahoehoe lava flow in the Iskut-Unuk River Cones volcanic field

At the southern end of the Northern Cordilleran Volcanic Province near the border between British Columbia and the Alaska Panhandle, lava flows and eight small volcanoes form a volcanic field known as the Iskut-Unuk River Cones. Lava flows date back 70,000 years ago during the Pleistocene epoch, but the eight volcanoes were likely formed between nine thousand and a few hundred years ago. At least five volcanoes sent lava 20 km (12 mi) down the Iskut and Unuk River valleys and their tributaries. The other three volcanoes were formed when glacial ice existed adjacent to the associated volcanic vents, creating scoria, pillow lava and hyaloclastite breccia. Volcanism in the Iskut River area has created at least ten lava flows and Lava Fork at least three. The most recent eruption of the Iskut-Unuk River Cones at The Volcano (also called Lava Fork volcano) in 1904 is also the most recent volcanic eruption in Canada.

Immediately north of the junction of the Pelly and Yukon rivers, Volcano Mountain in central Yukon consists of a cinder cone and a series of lava flows. It is the youngest volcano in the Fort Selkirk Volcanic Field and lava flows originated from fractures in the volcano's flank. These lava flows extend northeast and southwest of the volcano. The northeastern lava flow extends 5.5 km (3.4 mi) from Volcano Mountain whereas the southwestern lava flow extends 3 km (1.9 mi) from the volcano. These lava flows are composed of olivine nephelinite, a type of lava not commonly found on Earth. Nephelinite lavas are usually interpreted to have originated much deeper in the Earth's mantle unlike the typical basaltic lava found throughout the Northern Cordilleran Volcanic Province. The nephelinite lava flows at Volcano Mountain remain clear from vegetation and seem to be only a few hundred years old. However, dating of sediments in a lake dammed by the nephelinite lavas suggest the lava flows could not be younger than mid-Holocene and could be early Holocene or older. Therefore, the exact age for the most recent eruptions at Volcano Mountain are unknown.

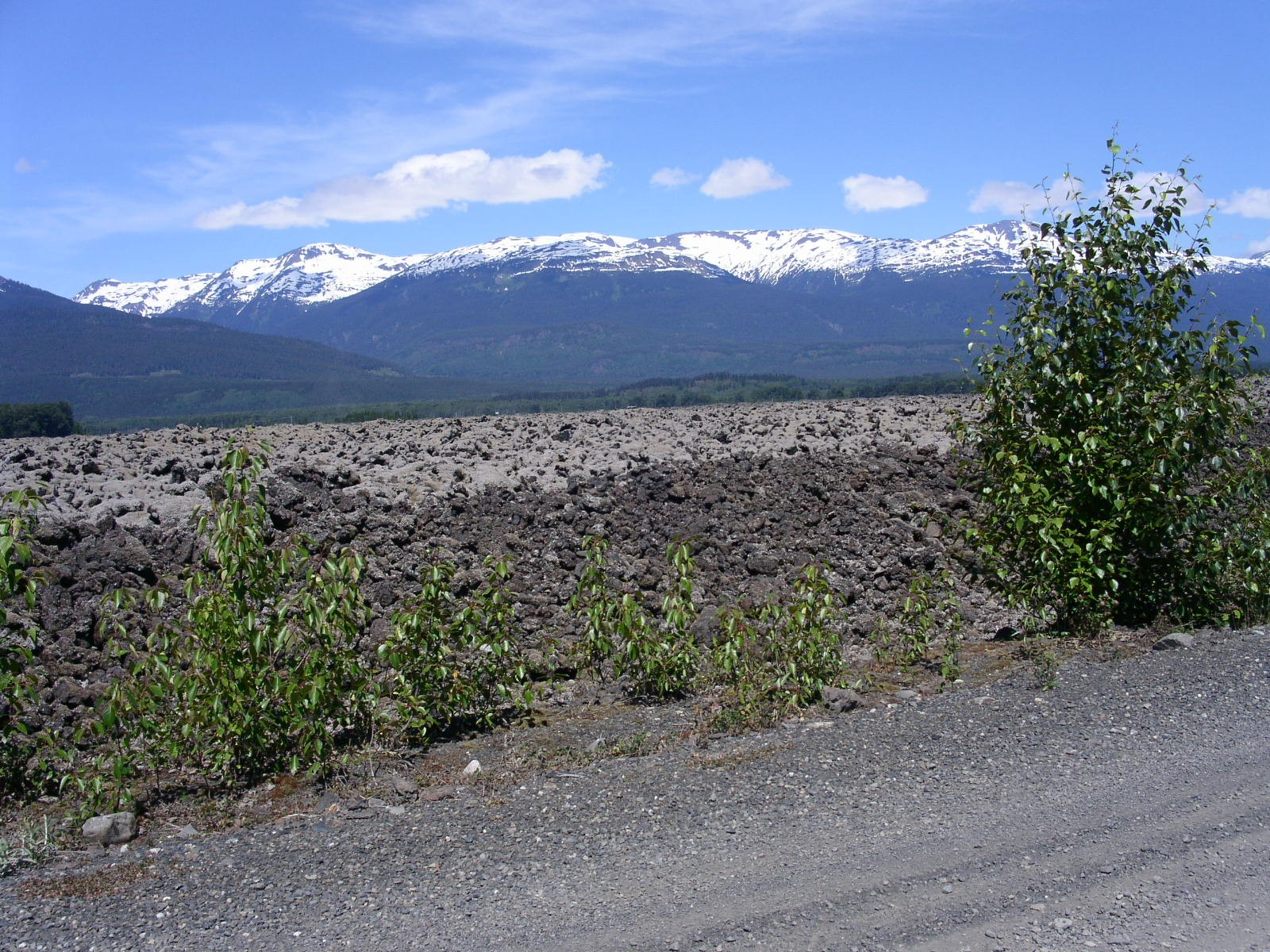
Nass valley lava beds

At the southernmost end of the Northern Cordilleran Volcanic Province, Tseax Cone lies in a valley above and east of the Tseax River. It is a young Holocene age cinder cone that was the source for a major basalt lava flow eruption around the years 1750 and 1775 that travelled into the Tseax River, damming it and forming Lava Lake. The lava flow subsequently travelled 11 km (6.8 mi) north to the Nass River, where it filled the flat valley floor for an additional 10 km (6.2 mi), making the entire lava flow 22.5 km (14.0 mi) long. Native legends from Nisga'a people in the area tell of a prolonged period of disruption by the volcano, including the destruction of two Nisga'a villages known as Lax Ksiluux and Wii Lax K'abit. Nisga'a people dug pits for shelter but at least 2,000 Nisga'a people were killed due to volcanic gases and poisonous smoke (most likely carbon dioxide). This is Canada's worst known geophysical disaster and is the only eruption in Canada for which legends of First Nations people have been proven true. As of 1993, the Tseax Cone quietly rests in Nisga'a Memorial Lava Bed Provincial Park.

More than 20 eruptions have occurred at the Mount Edziza volcanic complex in the past 10,000 years, including Mess Lake Cone, Kana Cone, Cinder Cliff, Icefall Cone, Ridge Cone, Williams Cone, Walkout Creek Cone, Moraine Cone, Sidas Cone, Sleet Cone, Storm Cone, Triplex Cones, Twin Cone, Cache Hill, Camp Hill, Cocoa Crater, Coffee Crater, Nahta Cone, Tennena Cone, The Saucer and the well-preserved Eve Cone. These cinder cones were formed no more than the year 700 based on the age of burnt plant stems still rooted in former soil under 2 m (6.6 ft) of loose basaltic fragments. The cones were built on the basaltic fragments and blocky lava fields surrounding the cones. The Snowshoe Lava Field on the southern end of the Big Raven Plateau is one of the areas of young lava flows in the region while the Desolation Lava Field on the northern end of the Big Raven Plateau is the largest area of young lava flows, covering an area of 150 km^{2} (58 mi^{2}). The longest lava flow is 12 km (7.5 mi). This volcanic activity was followed by at least two younger, but still undated eruptions.

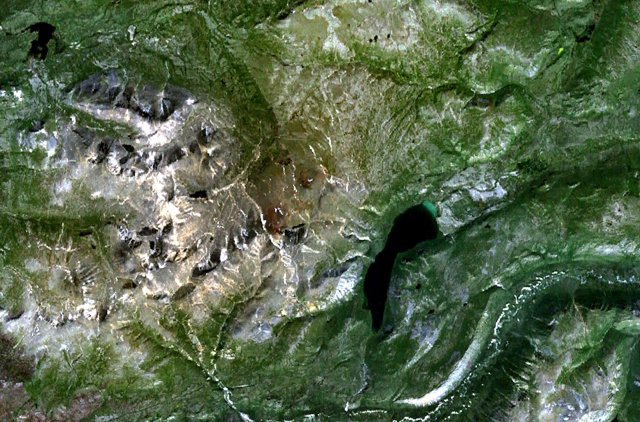
The Alligator Lake volcanic complex. The two small reddish brown areas in the middle are cinder cones.

Two well-preserved reddish-brown basaltic cinder cones cap a small shield volcano of the Alligator Lake volcanic complex in southcentral Yukon. These cinder cones are likely younger than the adjacent Holocene glaciation and both cones were erupting at the same time. These cinder cones produced alkaline olivine basalt to basanitic lava flows that extend to the north. Lava flows from the northeast cone are the largest, extending 6 km (3.7 mi) from the cone and expanding to a width of 10 km (6.2 mi) at the end. Sections of the lava flows comprise spinel lherzolite, xenoliths composed of granite and megacrysts of olivine, pyroxene and spinel.

An eruption was reported in the Atlin Volcanic Field by placer miners on November 8, 1898. Miners working in the area reportedly were able to work during the dark nights due to the glow of the eruption. A news report published on December 1, 1898 by the American newspaper publisher The New York Times stated:

Dr. W. D. Kinslee and T. P. James, Denver mining men who with Col. Hughes of Rossland have just returned from Alaska, report that a volcano is in active eruption about fifty miles from Atlin City. No name has yet been given to the volcano, but the officials of Atlin are preparing for a trip of inspection and will christen it. It is said to be the second in a string of four mountains lying fifty miles due south of Lake Gladys, all of which are more than 1,400 feet high.

In 1898 the Atlin area was in dispute with the Alaska-British Columbia boundary, leading American news broadcasters stating the Atlin area was in Alaska rather than in northwestern British Columbia. This Alaska-British Columbia boundary dispute was eventually resolved by arbitration in 1903 and no evidence for the 1898 eruption has been found, leading researchers to speculate the eruption and report as uncertain. However, given the location of the placer operations from which the eruption was supposedly visible (Pine, Birch, Discovery, and McKee creeks) and the reported location of the volcano 80 km (50 mi) south of Gladys Lake, the vent might possibly be in the very rugged and inaccessible Coast Mountains south or southwest of Atlin Lake.

On the south side of the Khutzeymateen Inlet north of Prince Rupert, thick basaltic Plinian eruption tephra deposits are recognized at Crow Lagoon. These volcanics originated from a volcanic vent that remains unidentified. However, existence of volcanic bombs at the Plinian tephra deposits indicates the volcanic vent of its origin is located nearby. The age of these volcanics is unknown but they were deposited throughout the Holocene epoch.

In the Pleistocene Tuya Volcanic Field, small subaerial shield volcanoes and postglacial cinder cones and lava flows can be recognized. At least one of these volcanoes is of Holocene age. Gabrielse Cone near the headwaters of Iverson Creek in the Stikine Ranges rises with an elevation of 1,600 m (5,200 ft) and a diameter of 400 m (1,300 ft). It is mostly made of loose basaltic scoria with a volcanic crater 30 m (98 ft) deep at its summit. The northeastern flank of Gabrielse Cone is ruptured where remnants of a basaltic lava flow exists. This basalt lava flow extends more than 400 m (1,300 ft) from the volcano and there is no proof Gabrielse Cone was formed during or before the Cordilleran Ice Sheet. As a result, Gabrielse Cone is unmistakably younger than 11,000 years and it was formed in the Holocene epoch.

=== Recent activity and hazards ===
At least five volcanoes have had seismic activity since 1985, including the Mount Edziza volcanic complex (eight events), Castle Rock (two events), Hoodoo Mountain (eight events), Crow Lagoon (four events) and The Volcano (five events). Seismic data suggests that these volcanoes still contain living magma chambers, indicating possible future eruptive activity. Although the available data does not allow a clear conclusion, these observations are further indications that some Northern Cordilleran volcanoes are potentially active and that their associated hazards may be significant. The seismic activity correlates both with some of Canada's most youthful volcanoes and with long-lived volcanoes with a history of significant explosive activity, such as Hoodoo Mountain and the Mount Edziza volcanic complex. To date, Edziza and Hoodoo pose the greatest threats in the Northern Cordilleran Volcanic Province. A large pumice deposit scattered throughout the Edziza complex highlights one of the significant volcanic hazards associated with the complex, including the possibility of a large explosive eruption. This large pumice deposit indicates that the Mount Edziza volcanic complex has a history of producing not only fluid and passive basaltic lava flows, but also more silica-rich trachytic and rhyolitic lava flows and explosive eruptions. The silica-rich compositions are similar to those associated with the most catastrophic eruptions on Earth. A large explosive eruption at the Edziza complex could produce an eruption column that would affect parts of the Pacific Northwest. Similarly, high eruption columns from Hoodoo Mountain would disrupt air traffic between Canada, Alaska and Asia. The flat summit of Hoodoo Mountain is also covered by an ice cap more than 100 m (330 ft) thick. An eruption from Hoodoo's summit would cause considerable melting of the ice cap to create large floods and lahars, which would have significant effects on adjacent river valleys. This includes the Iskut River just on the southern flank of Hoodoo Mountain, which is the host for a large amount of salmon, logging operations and a large mining and mineral exploration camp. Edziza and Hoodoo Mountain are two of the three most hazardous volcanoes in Western Canada that have been active in the past 10,000 years, the other being the Mount Meager massif in the Garibaldi Volcanic Belt of southwestern British Columbia which produced a large-scale eruption 2,350 years ago that sent ash as far as central Alberta.

Lava flows in the Northern Cordilleran Volcanic Province are among the least hazardous, even though they can be enormously destructive to property in their path. This is because lava generally moves slowly enough for people to get out of their way, though this is dependent on the viscosity of the lava. Lava flows typically have secondary hazards, including the destruction of buildings and ejection of volcanic gases. Forest fires started by lava flows are also a possibility in this part of Canada. The typical lava fountains in the Northern Cordilleran Volcanic Province are commonly associated with lava flows, but these do not normally reach heights more than a few hundred metres. Therefore, the dangers caused by lava fountains are only adjacent to the erupting volcano.

Currently, no volcanoes in the Northern Cordilleran Volcanic Province are monitored closely enough by the Geological Survey of Canada to ascertain how active their magma chambers are. An existing network of seismographs has been established to monitor tectonic earthquakes and is too far away to provide a good indication of what is happening beneath them. It may sense an increase in activity if a volcano becomes very restless, but this may only provide a warning for a large eruption. It might detect activity only once a volcano has started erupting. The Interagency Volcanic Event Notification Plan, Canada's volcanic emergency notification program, was established to outline the notification procedure of some of the main agencies that would be involved in response to a volcanic eruption in Canada, an eruption close to Canada's borders, or an eruption significant enough to have an effect on Canada and its people. It focuses primarily on aviation safety because jet aircraft can quickly enter areas of volcanic ash. The program notifies all impacted agencies that have to deal with volcanic events. Aircraft are rerouted away from hazardous ash and people on the ground are notified of potential ash fall.

== See also ==
- Volcanology of Canada
- Volcanology of Northern Canada
- Volcanology of Western Canada
