= List of Northern Cordilleran volcanoes =

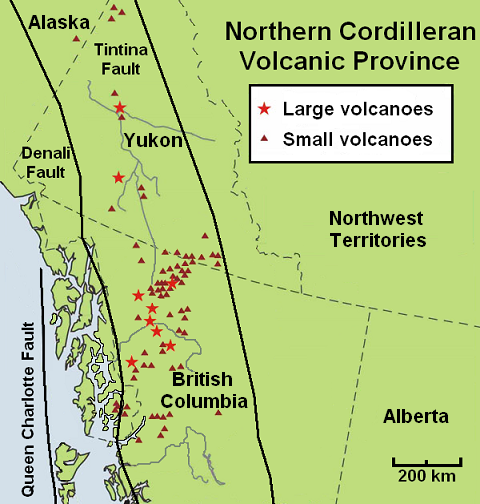
Minor and major volcanoes of the Northern Cordilleran Volcanic Province, including the Queen Charlotte, Denali and Tintina fault zones

The geography of northwestern British Columbia and Yukon, Canada is dominated by volcanoes of the Northern Cordilleran Volcanic Province formed due to continental rifting of the North American Plate. It is the most active volcanic region in Canada. Some of the volcanoes are notable for their eruptions, for instance, Tseax Cone for its catastrophic eruption estimated to have occurred in the 18th century which was responsible for the death of at least 2,000 Nisga'a people from poisonous volcanic gases, the Mount Edziza volcanic complex for at least 20 eruptions throughout the past 10,000 years, and The Volcano (also known as Lava Fork volcano) for the most recent eruption in Canada during 1904. The majority of volcanoes in the Northern Cordilleran Volcanic Province lie in Canada while a very small portion of the volcanic province lies in the U.S. state of Alaska.

Volcanoes of the Northern Cordilleran Volcanic Province are a part of the Pacific Ring of Fire. The largest and most persistent volcanoes are the Mount Edziza volcanic complex and Level Mountain in northwestern British Columbia which have had volcanic activity for millions of years. In the past 7.5 million years, the Mount Edziza volcanic complex has had five phases of volcanic activity while Level Mountain north of Edziza has had three phases of volcanic activity in the past 14.9 million years. The 1,000 km^{2} (390 sq mi) Mount Edziza volcanic complex has been made into a provincial park since 1972 to protect its volcanic landscape. The 102 Northern Cordilleran volcanoes in the list below are grouped into their political regions in north–south order.

== Scope ==
There is no single standard definition for a volcano. It can be defined from individual vents, volcanic edifices or volcanic fields. Interior of ancient volcanoes may have been eroded, creating a new subsurface magma chamber as a separate volcano. Many contemporary volcanoes rise as young parasitic cones from flank vents or at a central crater. Some volcanoes are grouped into one volcano name, for instance, the Mount Edziza volcanic complex, although individual vents are named by local people. The status of a volcano, either active, dormant or extinct, cannot be defined precisely. An indication of a volcano is determined by either its historical records, potassium-argon dating, radiocarbon dating, or geothermal activities.

The primary source of the list below is taken from the Geological Survey of Canada website, compiled by the Earth Sciences Sector of Natural Resources Canada, in which Northern Cordilleran volcanoes in the past 66.4 million years are listed. The Geological Survey of Canada use a catalogue of volcanoes grouped by volcano fields, lava fields and mountain ranges. The Geological Survey of Canada list is the most complete list of volcanoes in the Northern Cordilleran Volcanic Province, but work of understanding the frequency and eruption characteristics at volcanoes in Canada is a slow process. This is because most of Canada's dormant and potentially active volcanoes are located in isolated jagged regions, very few scientists study Canadian volcanoes and the provision of money in the Canadian government is limited. Because of these issues, scientists that study Canada's volcanoes have a basic understanding of Canada's volcanic heritage and how it might impact people in the future. Therefore, instead of using the dates of recorded eruptions, the Geological Survey of Canada mostly uses geological epochs for estimating when a volcano last erupted. Geological epoches include the Cenozoic (66.4 million years ago to present) and its subdivisions Miocene (23.7 to 5.3 million years ago), Pliocene (5.3 to 1.6 million years ago), Quaternary (1.6 million years ago to present), Pleistocene (1.6 to 0.01 million years ago) and Holocene (0.01 million years ago to present).

== Political groups ==
=== Alaska ===
The northernmost portion of the Northern Cordilleran Volcanic Province extends just across the Alaska-Yukon border into the Southeast Fairbanks Census Area of eastcentral Alaska. Here, a single cinder cone, dated at 177,000 years old occurs within the metamorphic and granitic composed upland of the Yukon–Tanana terrane. Prindle Volcano is approximately 31 km (19 mi) west of the Alaska-Yukon border.

Volcanoes
Name	Type	Last eruption	Location
Prindle Volcano	Cinder cone	Pleistocene	63.72°N 141.62°W

=== Yukon ===
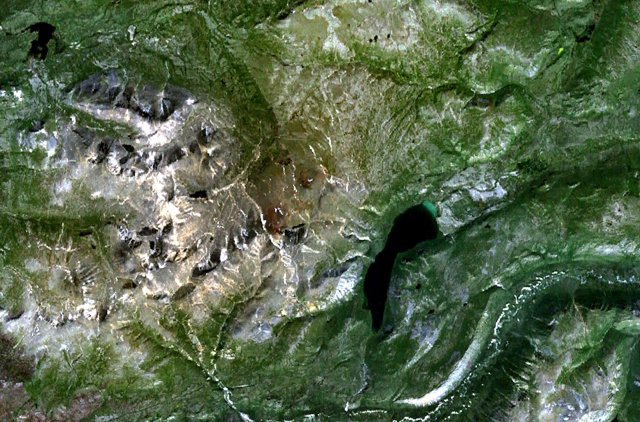
Alligator Lake (right-middle) and the Alligator Lake volcanic field

The central portion of the Northern Cordilleran Volcanic Province extends through Yukon where very few Northern Cordilleran volcanoes exist. Near the junction of the Yukon and Pelly rivers in central Yukon lies the Fort Selkirk Volcanic Field. It is the northernmost Holocene age volcanic field in Canada, consisting of a sequence of valley-filling basalt and basanite lava flows. Further south near the capital city of Whitehorse, a group of volcanoes and lava flows were constructed near Alligator Lake possibly in the past 10,000 years.

Volcanoes
Name	Type	Last eruption	Location
Volcano Mountain	Cinder cone	Holocene	62.93°N 137.37°W
Fort Selkirk Vent	Cinder cone	Pleistocene	62.77°N 137.42°W
Ne Ch'e Ddhawa	Cinder cone	Pleistocene	62.47°N 137.24°W
Ibex Mountain	Cinder cone	Pleistocene	60.53°N 135.52°W
Watson Lake Cone	Cinder cone	Pleistocene	60.00°N 129.00°W
Erupted products
Name	Type	Age	Location
Clinton Creek	Lava flow	Pliocene	64.40°N 140.63°W
Forty Mile	Unknown	Miocene	64.38°N 140.5°W
Moose Creek	Unknown	Cenozoic	64.16°N 140.91°W
Sixty Mile	Unknown	Miocene	64.05°N 140.74°W
Rosebud Creek	Lava flow	Pliocene	63.25°N 138.24°W
Yukon River	Lava flow	Pleistocene	62.83°N 137.7°W
Holbrook Creek	Lava flow	Pleistocene	62.80°N 137.98°W
Mushroom	Lava flow	Pliocene	62.80°N 137.45°W
Pelly Formation	Lava flow	Pleistocene	62.80°N 137.5°W
Wolverine Formation	Lava flow	Pleistocene	62.70°N 137.4°W
Minto	Lava flow	Holocene	62.60°N 137.2°W
Miles Canyon Basalts	Lava flow	Miocene	60.40°N 135.00°W

=== British Columbia ===
Over half of the Northern Cordilleran volcanoes are located in northwestern British Columbia. This portion is where the most recent eruptions in Canada and of the Northern Cordilleran Volcanic Province have occurred, including the catastrophic 18th century eruption of Tseax Cone and the 1904 eruption of The Volcano.

The Northern Cordilleran volcanoes of British Columbia comprises shield volcanoes, stratovolcanoes, subglacial volcanoes, lava domes and a large number of small cinder cones and associated lava plains. The Northern Cordilleran volcanoes of northwestern British Columbia are disposed along short, northerly trending segments which are unmistakably involved with north-trending rift structures including synvolcanic grabens and grabens with one major fault line along only one of the boundaries (half-grabens) similar to those associated with the East African Rift, which extends from the Afar triple junction southward across eastern Africa.

Volcanoes
Name	Type	Last eruption	Location
Volcanic Creek Cone	Cinder cone	Holocene	59.75°N 133.45°W
Cracker Creek Cone	Cinder cone	Quaternary	59.70°N 133.29°W
Ruby Mountain	Cinder cone	Historic	59.68°N 123.33°W
Iverson Creek Volcano	Outcrop	Pleistocene	59.50°N 130.28°W
Toozaza Peak	Tuya	Pleistocene	59.50°N 130.3°W
Klinkit Lake Peak	Tuya	Pleistocene	59.49°N 131.00°W
Klinkit Creek Peak	Tuya	Pleistocene	59.47°N 131.28°W
Gabrielse Cone	Cinder cone	Holocene	59.44°N 130.46°W
Mount Sanford	Outcrop	Cenozoic	59.42°N 132.75°W
Cottonwood Peak	Outcrop	Pleistocene	59.40°N 130.25°W
Ash Mountain	Subglacial mound	Pleistocene	59.27°N 130.5°W
Chakatah Creek Peak	Subglacial mound	Pleistocene	59.25°N 131.03°W
Caribou Tuya	Subglacial mound	Pleistocene	59.24°N 130.56°W
South Tuya	Subglacial mound	Pleistocene	59.21°N 130.5°W
Mathews Tuya	Subglacial mound	Pleistocene	59.20°N 130.43°W
Tuya Butte	Tuya	Pleistocene	59.13°N 130.55°W
Isspah Butte	Tuya	Pleistocene	59.07°N 131.32°W
Mount Josephine	Subglacial mound	Pleistocene	59.6°N 130.7°W
Chikoida Mountain	Outcrop	Cenozoic	59.2°N 133.4°W
Meehaz Mountain	Subglacial mound	Pleistocene	59.00°N 131.44°W
Kawdy Mountain	Subglacial mound	Pleistocene	58.88°N 131.23°W
Nuthinaw Mountain	Subglacial mound	Pleistocene	58.79°N 131.06°W
Tutsingale Mountain	Subglacial mound	Pleistocene	58.78°N 130.87°W
Dark Mountain	Subglacial mound	Pleistocene	58.64°N 129.35°W
Heart Peaks	Shield volcano	Pleistocene	58.60°N 131.97°W
Swinton Creek Volcano	Outcrop	Pleistocene	58.57°N 129.84°W
Little Eagle Cone	Subglacial mound	Pleistocene	58.52°N 129.71°W
Meszah Peak	Outcrop	Pleistocene	58.48°N 131.43°W
Dome Mountain	Subglacial mound	Pleistocene	58.45°N 129.59°W
Level Mountain	Shield volcano	Pleistocene	58.42°N 131.35°W
Enid Creek Cone	Subglacial mound	Pleistocene	58.38°N 129.52°W
Kana Cone	Cinder cone	Holocene	57.90°N 130.62°W
Sidas Cone	Cinder cone	Holocene	57.87°N 130.63°W
Castle Rock	Volcanic plug	Pleistocene	57.84°N 131.15°W
Eve Cone	Cinder cone	Holocene	57.82°N 130.67°W
Triplex Cones	Cinder cones	Holocene	57.80°N 130.62°W
Twin Cone	Cinder cone	Holocene	57.80°N 130.53°W
Sleet Cone	Cinder cone	Holocene	57.78°N 130.55°W
Williams Cone	Cinder cone	Holocene	57.78°N 130.6°W
Klastline Cone	Cinder cone	Pleistocene	57.78°N 130.5°W
Tsekone Ridge	Subglacial mound	Pleistocene	57.77°N 130.69°W
Storm Cone	Cinder cone	Holocene	57.77°N 130.63°W
Moraine Cone	Cinder cone	Holocene	57.77°N 130.62°W
Glacier Dome	Lava dome	Pleistocene	57.77°N 130.58°W
The Pyramid	Lava dome	Pleistocene	57.77°N 130.57°W
Pillow Ridge	Subglacial mound	Pleistocene	57.76°N 130.64°W
Sphinx Dome	Lava dome	Pleistocene	57.75°N 130.58°W
Cinder Cliff	Cinder cone	Holocene	57.75°N 130.57°W
Triangle Dome	Lava dome	Pleistocene	57.72°N 130.65°W
Mount Edziza	Stratovolcano	Pleistocene	57.72°N 130.63°W
Nanook Dome	Lava dome	Pleistocene	57.72°N 130.6°W
Ice Peak	Stratovolcano	Holocene	57.70°N 130.63°W
Icefall Cone	Cinder cone	Holocene	57.70°N 130.6°W
Tennena Cone	Subglacial mound	Holocene	57.68°N 130.67°W
Ridge Cone	Cinder cone	Pleistocene	57.68°N 130.62°W
The Neck	Volcanic plug	Pleistocene	57.66°N 130.59°W
Cocoa Crater	Cinder cone	Holocene	57.65°N 130.7°W
Pharaoh Dome	Lava dome	Pleistocene	57.65°N 130.6°W
Coffee Crater	Cinder cone	Holocene	57.63°N 130.67°W
The Saucer	Cinder cone	Holocene	57.63°N 130.63°W
Keda Cone	Cinder cone	Holocene	57.60°N 130.68°W
Sezill Volcano	Lava dome	Miocene	57.59°N 130.62°W
Camp Hill	Cinder cone	Holocene	57.58°N 130.78°W
Walkout Creek Cone	Cinder cone	Holocene	57.58°N 130.75°W
IGC Centre	Lava dome	Miocene	57.56°N 130.62°W
Cartoona Ridge	Lava dome	Miocene	57.56°N 130.57°W
Tadeda Centre	Lava dome	Miocene	57.54°N 130.61°W
Cache Hill	Cinder cone	Holocene	57.53°N 130.67°W
Armadillo Peak	Stratovolcano	Miocene	57.53°N 130.55°W
Mess Lake Cone	Cinder cone	Holocene	57.47°N 130.75°W
Little Iskut	Outcrop	Pliocene	57.47°N 130.55°W
The Ash Pit	Volcanic crater	Holocene	57.45°N 130.78°W
Spectrum Range	Shield volcano	Holocene	57.43°N 130.68°W
Outcast Hill	Cinder cone	Pleistocene	57.40°N 130.77°W
Maitland Volcano	Shield volcano	Pliocene	57.40°N 129.7°W
Exile Hill	Cinder cone	Pliocene	57.38°N 130.82°W
Spectrum Dome	Lava dome	Pliocene	57.38°N 130.68°W
Yeda Peak	Lava dome	Pliocene	57.38°N 130.68°W
Tadekho Hill	Subglacial mound	Pleistocene	57.35°N 130.78°W
Nahta Cone	Cinder cone	Holocene	57.32°N 130.82°W
Wetalth Ridge	Subglacial mound	Pleistocene	57.32°N 130.78°W
Source Hill	Cinder cone	Pleistocene	57.28°N 130.82°W
Thaw Hill	Cinder cone	Pleistocene	57.28°N 130.82°W
Little Bear Mountain	Tuya	Pleistocene	56.80°N 131.3°W
Hoodoo Mountain	Stratovolcano	Holocene	56.78°N 131.28°W
Tom MacKay Creek Cone	Subglacial mound	Pleistocene	56.71°N 130.56°W
Iskut Canyon Cone	Cinder cone	Holocene	56.71°N 130.6°W
Snippaker Creek Cone	Cinder cone	Holocene	56.63°N 130.87°W
Cinder Mountain	Subglacial mound	Pleistocene	56.57°N 130.61°W
Cone Glacier Volcano	Cinder cone	Holocene	56.56°N 130.66°W
King Creek Cone	Subglacial mound	Pleistocene	56.49°N 130.66°W
The Volcano	Cinder cone	Historic	56.42°N 130.85°W
Second Canyon Cone	Cinder cone	Holocene	56.41°N 130.72°W
The Thumb	Volcanic plug	Pleistocene	56.16°N 126.7°W
Tseax Cone	Cinder cone	Historic	55.12°N 128.9°W
Crow Lagoon	Cinder cone	Pleistocene	54.7°N 130.23°W
Erupted products
Name	Type	Age	Location
Anderson Bay	Lava flow	Miocene	59.3°N 133.75°W
Desolation Lava Field	Lava field	Holocene	57.82°N 130.62°W
Snowshoe Lava Field	Lava field	Holocene	57.65°N 130.67°W
Sheep Track Pumice	Pumice deposit	Holocene	57.64°N 130.67°W
Mess Lake Lava Field	Lava field	Holocene	57.47°N 130.75°W

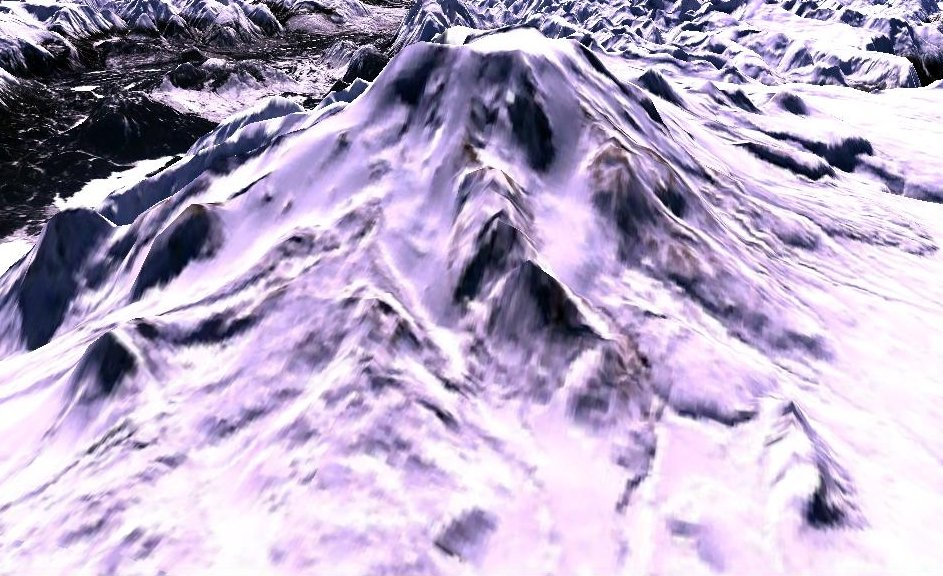
Northwestern flank of Mount Edziza

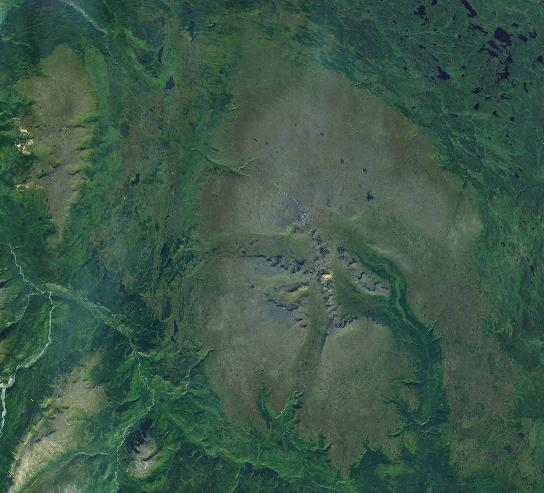
Satellite image of Level Mountain (middle) and Heart Peaks (upper-left corner)

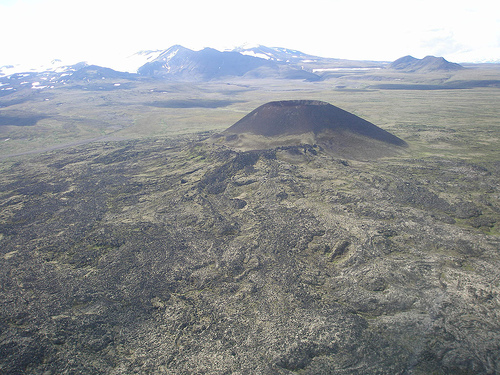
Eve Cone lying in the Desolation Lava Field

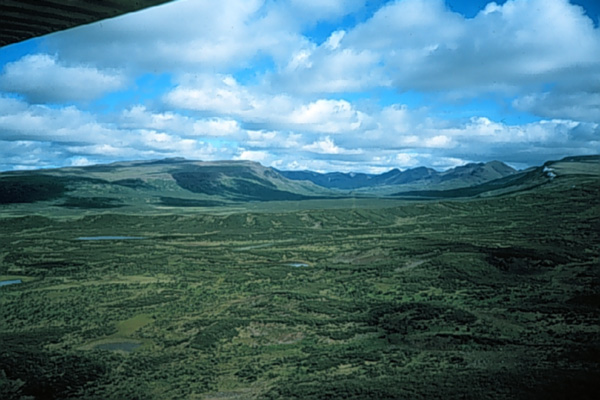
Level Mountain with extensive elevated plateau in the foreground

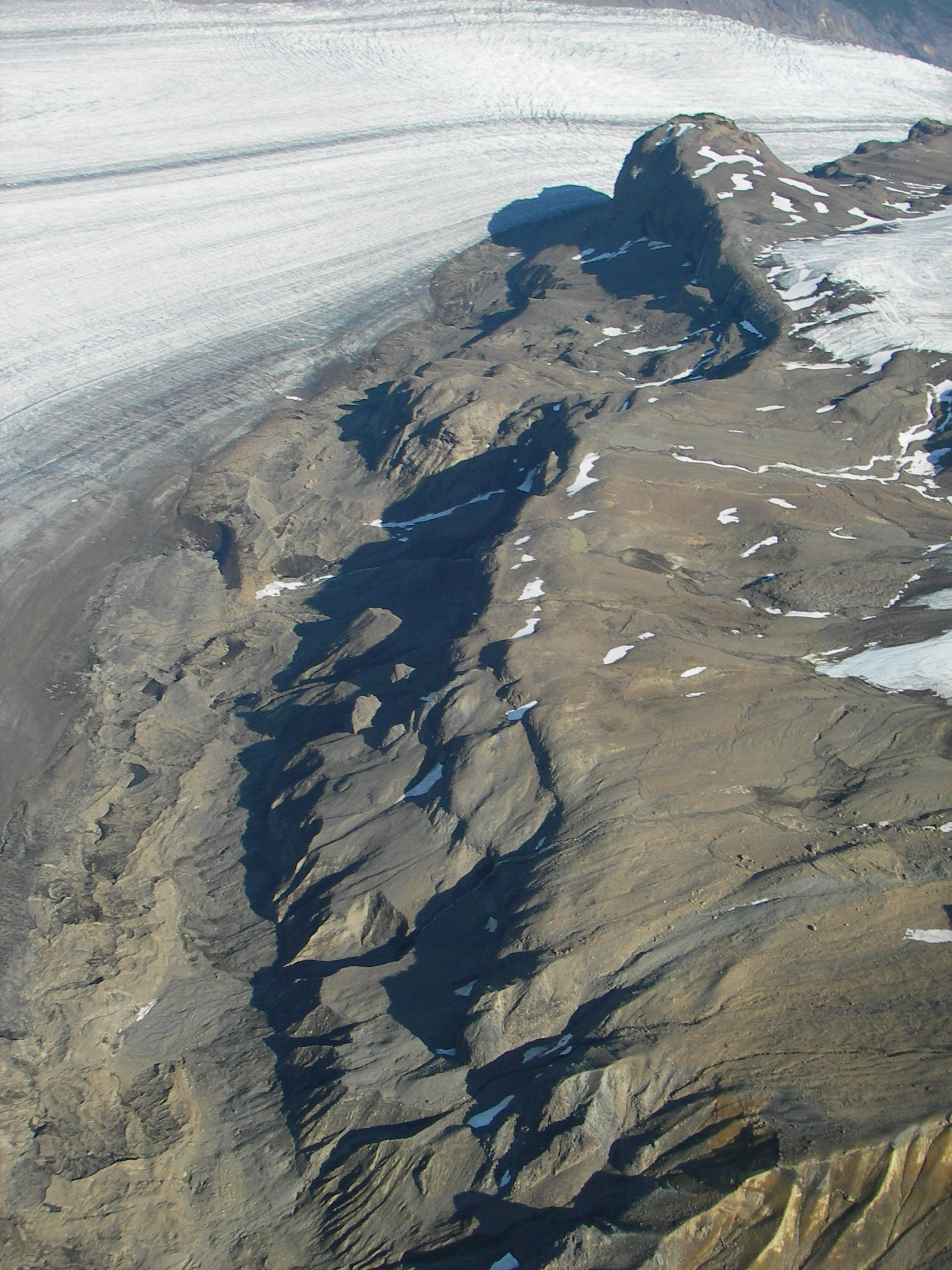
Hoodoo Glacier and lava flows on the flanks of Hoodoo Mountain

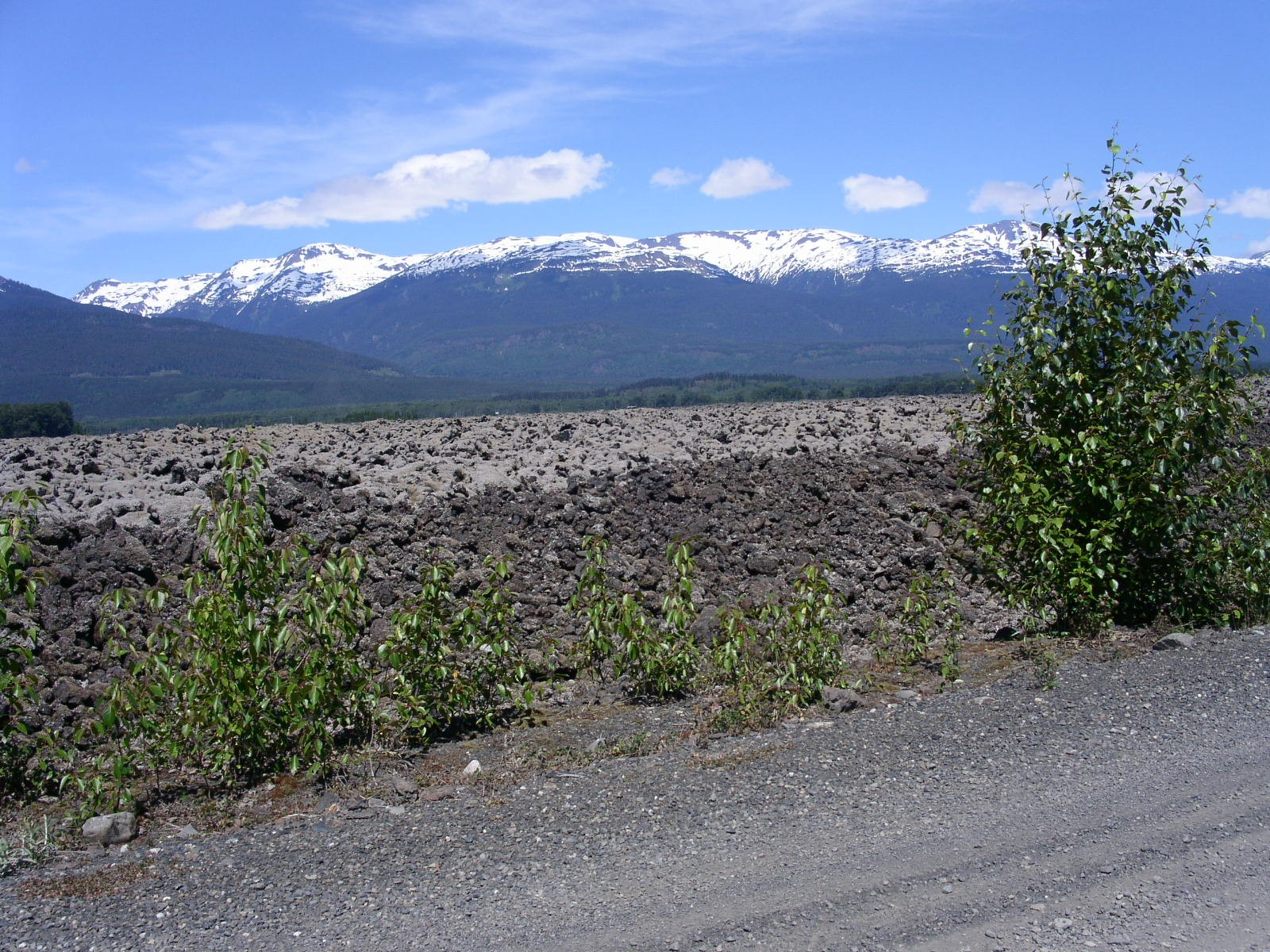
Nass valley lava beds formed by eruptions of the Tseax Cone

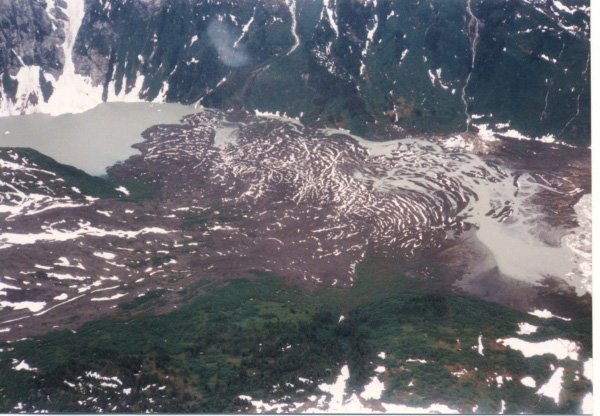
Recently extruded basaltic lava at the Blue River

== See also ==
- List of volcanoes in the United States
- List of volcanoes in Canada
- List of Cascade volcanoes
- Volcanism of Canada
- Volcanism of Northern Canada
- Volcanism of Western Canada
