= Meehaz Mountain =

Mountain in British Columbia, Canada

- Location within British Columbia
- Interactive map of Meehaz Mountain

Highest point
- Elevation: 1,608 m (5,276 ft)
- Prominence: 318 m (1,043 ft)
- Listing: List of volcanoes in Canada
- Coordinates: 59°00′11.2″N 131°27′02.9″W

Geography
- Location: British Columbia, Canada
- District: Cassiar Land District
- Parent range: Kawdy Plateau/Stikine Plateau
- Topo map: NTS 104O3 Nazcha Creek

Geology
- Mountain type: Subglacial mound
- Volcanic zone: Northern Cordilleran Volcanic Province
- Last eruption: Pleistocene

Meehaz Mountain is a mountain in the Cassiar Country of the Northern Interior of British Columbia, Canada, located on the north side of the headwaters of Teslin River and to the south of the Atsutla Range. It is a product of subglacial volcanism during the Pleistocene period when this area was covered by thick glacial ice, forming a subglacial volcano that never broke through the overlying glacial ice known as a subglacial mound.

== See also ==
- List of Northern Cordilleran volcanoes
- List of volcanoes in Canada
- Volcanism of Canada
- Volcanism of Western Canada
