= Fort Selkirk Vent =

Cinder cone in Canada

Fort Selkirk Vent is a geological name for a cinder cone in central Yukon, Canada, located just east of Fort Selkirk along the Yukon River.

Fort Selkirk Vent and the surrounding landscape lies in the Fort Selkirk Volcanic Field of the Northern Cordilleran Volcanic Province. During the Pleistocene period, eruptions of basaltic lava occurred. One of these several eruptions created Fort Selkirk Vent and no eruptions have originated from Fort Selkirk Vent since the Pleistocene period.

== See also ==
- List of volcanoes in Canada
- List of Northern Cordilleran volcanoes
- Volcanism of Canada
- Volcanism of Western Canada
