= Chikoida Mountain =

Mountain in British Columbia, Canada

- Location within British Columbia
- Interactive map of Chikoida Mountain

Highest point
- Elevation: 1,927 m (6,322 ft)
- Prominence: 975 m (3,199 ft)
- Listing: Mountains of British Columbia
- Coordinates: 59°13′58″N 133°02′46″W

Geography
- Country: Canada
- Province: British Columbia
- District: Cassiar Land District
- Parent range: Taku Plateau
- Topo map: NTS 104N3 Sloko River

Geology
- Rock age: Cenozoic
- Volcanic zone: Northern Cordilleran Volcanic Province
- Last eruption: Cenozoic

Chikoida Mountain is a mountain on the Taku Plateau in northwestern British Columbia, Canada, located 52 km (32 mi) southeast of Atlin on the east side of the Silver Salmon River.

Chikoida Mountain is a volcanic feature of the Northern Cordilleran Volcanic Province that formed in the past 66.4 million years of the Cenozoic era.

== See also ==
- List of volcanoes in Canada
- List of Northern Cordilleran volcanoes
- Volcanism of Canada
- Volcanism of Western Canada
- Volcanic history of the Northern Cordilleran Volcanic Province
