= Chakatah Creek Peak =

Subglacial mound in the country of Canada

Coordinates: 59.25°N 131.03°W

Chakatah Creek Peak is a subglacial mound in northwestern British Columbia, Canada. It is one of the volcanoes of the Northern Cordilleran Volcanic Province and last erupted in the Pleistocene period.

== See also ==
- List of volcanoes in Canada
- List of Northern Cordilleran volcanoes
- Volcanism of Canada
- Volcanism of Western Canada
- Volcanic history of the Northern Cordilleran Volcanic Province
