= Swinton Creek Volcano =

Swinton Creek

Highest point
- Coordinates: 58.57°N 129.84°W

Geography
- Location: British Columbia
- Topo map: NTS 104I12 Halfmoon Lake

Geology
- Mountain type: Outcrop
- Volcanic belt: Stikine volcanic belt
- Last eruption: Pleistocene era

The Swinton Creek Volcano is an eroded volcanic outcrop in northwestern British Columbia, Canada. It is one of the volcanoes of the Northern Cordilleran Volcanic Province and last erupted in the Pleistocene period.

== See also ==
- List of volcanoes in Canada
- List of Northern Cordilleran volcanoes
- Volcanism of Canada
- Volcanism of Western Canada
