= Iverson Creek Volcano =

Iverson Creek Volcano is an eroded volcanic outcrop in northwestern British Columbia, Canada. It is one of the volcanoes of the Northern Cordilleran Volcanic Province and last erupted in the Pleistocene period.

== See also ==
- List of volcanoes in Canada
- List of Northern Cordilleran volcanoes
- Volcanism of Canada
- Volcanism of Western Canada
