= Dome Mountain =

Mountain in British Columbia, Canada

- Location within British Columbia
- Interactive map of Dome Mountain

Highest point
- Elevation: 2,031 m (6,663 ft)
- Prominence: 136 m (446 ft)
- Coordinates: 58°27′21″N 129°38′11″W

Geography
- Location: British Columbia, Canada
- District: Cassiar Land District
- Topo map: NTS 104I5 Tanzilla Butte

Geology
- Rock age: Pleistocene
- Mountain type: Subglacial mound
- Volcanic zone: Northern Cordilleran Volcanic Province
- Last eruption: Pleistocene

Round Mountain is a mountain in northwestern British Columbia, Canada, located 22 km (14 mi) east of Dease Lake.

Round Mountain is a volcanic feature of the Northern Cordilleran Volcanic Province that formed in the past 1.6 million years of the Pleistocene

== See also ==
- List of volcanoes in Canada
- List of Northern Cordilleran volcanoes
- Volcanism of Canada
- Volcanism of Western Canada
