= Tutsingale Mountain =

Mountain in British Columbia, Canada

- Location within British Columbia
- Interactive map of Tutsingale Mountain

Highest point
- Elevation: 1,722 m (5,650 ft)
- Prominence: 272 m (892 ft)
- Listing: List of volcanoes in Canada
- Coordinates: 58°46′51.2″N 130°52′42.5″W

Geography
- Location: Cassiar Country, British Columbia, Canada
- District: Cassiar Land District
- Parent range: Kawdy Plateau (northern Stikine Plateau)
- Topo map: NTS 104J15 Calata Lake

Geology
- Mountain type: Subglacial mound
- Volcanic zone: Northern Cordilleran Volcanic Province
- Last eruption: Pleistocene

Tutsingle Mountain is a mountain on the Stikine Plateau in northern British Columbia, Canada, located east of Nuthinaw Mountain and northwest of Dease Lake on the northeast side of the Tachilta Lakes. It is a product of subglacial volcanism during the Pleistocene period when this area was covered by thick glacial ice, forming a subglacial volcano that never broke through the overlying glacial ice known as a subglacial mound.

== See also ==
- List of Northern Cordilleran volcanoes
- List of volcanoes in Canada
- Volcanism of Canada
- Volcanism of Western Canada
