= Mount Josephine (British Columbia) =

Mountain in British Columbia, Canada

- Location within British Columbia
- Interactive map of Mount Josephine

Highest point
- Elevation: 1,767 m (5,797 ft)
- Prominence: 517 m (1,696 ft)
- Listing: List of volcanoes in Canada
- Coordinates: 59°03′54″N 130°42′10″W

Geography
- Location: British Columbia, Canada
- District: Cassiar Land District
- Parent range: Tuya Range
- Topo map: NTS 104O2 Tuya Lake

Geology
- Rock age: Pleistocene
- Mountain type: Subglacial mound
- Volcanic field: Tuya volcanic field
- Last eruption: Pleistocene

Mount Josephine is a subglacial mound in the Tuya Range in British Columbia, Canada. It is located near the northwestern shore of Tuya Lake.

== See also ==
- Northern Cordilleran Volcanic Province
- List of Northern Cordilleran volcanoes
- Volcanology of Western Canada
