= Rosebud Creek (Yukon) =

Coordinates: 63°16′52.9″N 138°25′56.9″W

Rosebud Creek is a creek in eastcentral Yukon, Canada.

The landscape surrounding Rosebud Creek lies in the Fort Selkirk Volcanic Field of the Northern Cordilleran Volcanic Province. During the Pliocene period, a basaltic lava flow from the Fort Selkirk field engulfed the Rosebud Creek area. Remnants of this lava flow are exposed along both sides of Rosebud Creek in the area of the confluence of Rosebud and Grand Valley creeks.

== See also ==
- List of rivers of Yukon
- List of volcanoes in Canada
- List of Northern Cordilleran volcanoes
- Volcanism of Canada
- Volcanism of Northern Canada
