= Kawdy Mountain =

Kawdy Plateau subglacial mound

- Location within British Columbia
- Interactive map of Kawdy Mountain

Highest point
- Elevation: 1,936 m (6,352 ft)
- Prominence: 523 m (1,716 ft)
- Coordinates: 58.88°N 131.23°W

Geography
- Location: British Columbia, Canada
- District: Cassiar Land District
- Parent range: Kawdy Plateau (northern Stikine Plateau)
- Topo map: NTS 104J14 Kawdy Creek

Geology
- Rock age: Pleistocene
- Mountain type: Subglacial mound
- Volcanic zone: Northern Cordilleran Volcanic Province
- Last eruption: Pleistocene

Kawdy Mountain is a subglacial mound on the Kawdy Plateau, the northernmost sub-plateau of the Stikine Plateau in northwestern British Columbia, Canada. It consists of nearly horizontal beds of basaltic lava, capping outward dipping beds of fragmental volcanic rocks and last erupted in Pleistocene. Kawdy Mountain is one of many basaltic volcanic features of the Stikine Volcanic Belt, which is forming because the North American tectonic plate is stretching slightly as it moves to the west.

== See also ==
- List of Northern Cordilleran volcanoes
- List of volcanoes in Canada
- Northern Cordilleran Volcanic Province
- Volcanism of Canada
- Volcanism of Western Canada
