= Isspah Butte =

Butte in British Columbia, Canada

- Location within British Columbia
- Interactive map of Isspah Butte

Highest point
- Elevation: 1,673 m (5,489 ft)
- Prominence: 83 m (272 ft)
- Coordinates: 59°07′N 131°32′W

Geography
- Location: British Columbia, Canada
- District: Cassiar Land District
- Parent range: Atsutla Range
- Topo map: NTS 104O3 Nazcha Creek

Geology
- Rock age: Pleistocene
- Mountain type: Tuya
- Volcanic zone: Northern Cordilleran Volcanic Province
- Last eruption: Pleistocene

Isspah Butte is a tuya in the Atsutla Range of the Kawdy Plateau in northern British Columbia, Canada. It lies on the north side of the Nazcha Creek.

== See also ==
- List of volcanoes in Canada
- List of Northern Cordilleran volcanoes
- Volcanism of Canada
- Volcanism of Western Canada
