= Little Eagle Cone =

Coordinates: 58.5202°N 129.7126°W

Little Eagle Cone is a subglacial mound in northwestern British Columbia, Canada, located in the Dark Mountain area. It last erupted during the Pleistocene epoch.

== See also ==
- List of volcanoes in Canada
- List of Northern Cordilleran volcanoes
- Volcanism of Canada
- Volcanism of Western Canada
