= Wolverine Formation =

Geological formation in Yukon, Canada

The Wolverine Formation is a geological formation in central Yukon, Canada. It consists of a lava flow in the Fort Selkirk Volcanic Field of the Northern Cordilleran Volcanic Province that was erupted during the Pleistocene epoch.

== See also ==
- List of volcanoes in Canada
- List of Northern Cordilleran volcanoes
- Volcanism of Canada
- Volcanism of Northern Canada
