= Minto (lava flow) =

Lava flow in Canada

Highest point
- Coordinates: 62.80°N 137.45°W

Geography
- Location: Yukon, Canada

Geology
- Rock age: Holocene
- Mountain type: Lava flow

The Minto is the name of a lava flow located in Yukon that was erupted during the Holocene period in the Fort Selkirk Volcanic Field of the Northern Cordilleran Volcanic Province.

== See also ==
- List of volcanoes in Canada
- List of Northern Cordilleran volcanoes
- Volcanism of Canada
- Volcanism of Northern Canada
- Northern Cordilleran Volcanic Province
