= Nuthinaw Mountain =

Mountain in British Columbia, Canada

- Location within British Columbia
- Interactive map of Nuthinaw Mountain

Highest point
- Elevation: 1,732 m (5,682 ft)
- Prominence: 427 m (1,401 ft)
- Listing: List of volcanoes in Canada
- Coordinates: 58°47′24.0″N 131°03′46.1″W

Geography
- Location: British Columbia, Canada
- Parent range: Stikine Plateau
- Topo map: NTS 104J14 Kawdy Creek

Geology
- Mountain type: Subglacial mound
- Volcanic zone: Northern Cordilleran Volcanic Province
- Last eruption: Pleistocene

Nuthinaw Mountain is a mountain on the Stikine Plateau in northern British Columbia, Canada, located east of Tutsingale Mountain and 72 km (45 mi) northwest of Dease Lake on the north side of Tachilta Lakes. It is a product of subglacial volcanism during the Pleistocene period when this area was covered by thick glacial ice, forming a subglacial volcano that never broke through the overlying glacial ice known as a subglacial mound.

Nuthinaw is a Tahltan name meaning Cariboo fence went right into mountain.

== See also ==
- List of Northern Cordilleran volcanoes
- List of volcanoes in Canada
- Volcanism of Canada
- Volcanism of Western Canada
