= Enid Creek Cone =

- Location within British Columbia
- Interactive map of Enid Creek Cone

Highest point
- Coordinates: 58°23′N 129°31′W

Geography
- Location: British Columbia, Canada
- District: Cassiar Land District

Geology
- Rock age: Pleistocene
- Mountain type: Subglacial mound
- Volcanic zone: Stikine volcanic belt

Enid Creek Cone is a subglacial mound in northwestern British Columbia, Canada, located in the Dark Mountain area. It last erupted during the Pleistocene epoch.

== See also ==
- List of volcanoes in Canada
- List of Northern Cordilleran volcanoes
- Volcanism of Canada
- Volcanism of Western Canada
