= Holbrook Creek =

Waterway in Yukon, Canada

Holbrook Creek is a creek in east central Yukon, Canada.

The landscape surrounding Holbrook Creek lies in the Fort Selkirk Volcanic Field of the Northern Cordilleran Volcanic Province. During the Pleistocene period, a basaltic lava flow from the Fort Selkirk field engulfed the mouth of the Holbrook Creek. Remnants of this lava flow are exposed along the Yukon River for about one kilometre.

== See also ==
- List of rivers of Yukon
- List of volcanoes in Canada
- List of Northern Cordilleran volcanoes
- Volcanism of Canada
- Volcanism of Northern Canada
