= Anderson Bay =

Bay in Stikine Region, British Columbia, Canada

Coordinates: 59°19′00″N 133°42′00″W

Anderson Bay is a bay of Atlin Lake in northwestern British Columbia, Canada, located southwest of Pike Bay.

The landscape surrounding Anderson Bay lies in the Atlin Volcanic Field of the Northern Cordilleran Volcanic Province. During the Miocene period, a basaltic lava flow engulfed the southern end of Anderson Bay. Remnants of this lava flow are present as columnar-jointed lava flows.

== See also ==
- List of volcanoes in Canada
- List of Northern Cordilleran volcanoes
- Volcanism of Canada
- Volcanism of Western Canada
- Volcanic history of the Northern Cordilleran Volcanic Province
