= Mount Sanford (British Columbia) =

Mountain in British Columbia, Canada

- Location within British Columbia
- Interactive map of Mount Sanford

Highest point
- Elevation: 1,827 m (5,994 ft)
- Prominence: 402 m (1,319 ft)
- Coordinates: 59°29′31″N 132°49′23″W

Geography
- Location: British Columbia, Canada
- District: Cassiar Land District
- Topo map: NTS 104N7 Bell Lake

Geology
- Rock age: Cenozoic
- Volcanic zone: Northern Cordilleran Volcanic Province
- Last eruption: Cenozoic

Mount Sanford is a mountain in northwestern British Columbia, Canada, located 50 km (31 mi) east of Atlin.

Mount Sanford is a volcanic feature of the Northern Cordilleran Volcanic Province that formed in the past 66.4 million years of the Cenozoic epoch.

== See also ==
- List of volcanoes in Canada
- List of Northern Cordilleran volcanoes
- Volcanology of Canada
- Volcanology of Western Canada
