= Pharaoh Dome =

Lava dome in British Columbia, Canada

Coordinates: 57.65°N 130.6°W

Pharaoh Dome is a lava dome in northwestern British Columbia, Canada, located near Mount Edziza in Mount Edziza Provincial Park. It last erupted during the Pleistocene epoch.

== See also ==
- List of volcanoes in Canada
- List of Northern Cordilleran volcanoes
- Volcanism of Canada
- Volcanism of Western Canada
