= Ne Ch'e Ddhawa =

Eroded tuya in the Fort Selkirk Volcanic Field of central Yukon, Canada

Ne Ch'e Ddhäwa is the Northern Tutchone name for an eroded tuya approximately 7 km up the Yukon River from Fort Selkirk (UTM zone 8V 383955 E, 69600091 N) (it has been informally called Wootten's Cone) in the Fort Selkirk Volcanic Field of central Yukon, Canada. It has been described as a cinder cone or a subglacial mound. The volcano erupted subglacially between 2.0 and 2.3 million years ago during the early Pleistocene, erupting hyaloclastite tuffs, breccias, and pillow breccias. These hyaloclastites locally contain exotic clasts and bodies of till melted from an ice sheet during the subglacial eruption.

== See also ==
- Volcanism of Canada
- List of Northern Cordilleran volcanoes
- List of volcanoes in Canada
