= Spanish Mump =

- Location within British Columbia
- Interactive map of Spanish Mump

Highest point
- Elevation: 1,800 m (5,900 ft)
- Coordinates: 52.16°N 120.33°W

Geography
- Location: British Columbia, Canada

Geology
- Rock age: Pleistocene
- Mountain type: Subglacial mound
- Volcanic field: Wells Gray-Clearwater volcanic field
- Last eruption: Pleistocene

Spanish Mump is a subglacial mound in east-central British Columbia, Canada, located in the northeastern corner of Wells Gray Provincial Park.

== See also ==
- List of volcanoes in Canada
- Volcanism of Canada
- Volcanism of Western Canada
