= Volcano Mountain =

Cinder cone in central Yukon Territory, Canada

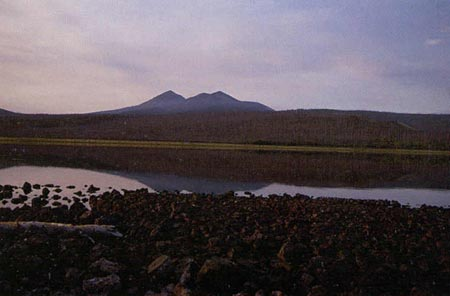

Highest point
- Elevation: 1,239 m (4,065 ft)
- Coordinates: 62.93°N 137.38°W

Geography
- Location: Yukon, Canada
- Parent range: Yukon Ranges
- Topo map: NTS 115I14 Volcano Mountain

Geology
- Rock age: Holocene?
- Mountain type: Cinder cone
- Volcanic zone: Northern Cordilleran Volcanic Province
- Volcanic field: Fort Selkirk volcanic field

Volcano Mountain is a cinder cone in central Yukon Territory, Canada, located a short distance north of Fort Selkirk, near the confluence of the Pelly and Yukon Rivers. Volcano Mountain is called Nelrúna in the Northern Tutchone language.

== Geology ==
Volcano Mountain is the youngest volcano in the Fort Selkirk Volcanic Field and one of the youngest in the northern section of the Northern Cordilleran Volcanic Province. The lava at Volcano Mountain is olivine nephelinite, which is an uncommon type of lava. This type of lava is believed to have come from much deeper inside the Earth than basaltic lava.

A hill 2.7 kilometres (1.7 mi) to the west of Volcano Mountain has basaltic columns and has been interpreted to be an ancestral cone of the edifice.

Volcanism in the Fort Selkirk Volcanic Field appears to follow the Tintina Fault. Over four million years of activity, this has migrated northward along the fault by about 27 kilometres (17 mi) to reach the area where Volcano Mountain is today. This has been theorized to result from pressure in the asthenosphere changing over time under the weight of glaciers or to be movement of magma from an unknown cause.

Volcano Mountain and other eruptive centres in the Fort Selkirk Volcanic Field lie on top of glacial deposits. Below that is volcanic material from the Carmacks Group, which was erupted in a subduction zone setting in the Late Tertiary.

== Eruptive history ==
Researchers have discovered evidence for seven individual eruptions at Volcano Mountain. The most recent of these is estimated to have occurred around 7300 years ago. Eruption deposits consist of lava flows and cinder cones.

The upper 210 metres (690 ft) of the volcano is made up of a cinder cone. The age of the summit cinder cone is unknown but it likely predates eruptions on the north and south flanks that led to landslides originating from the cone.

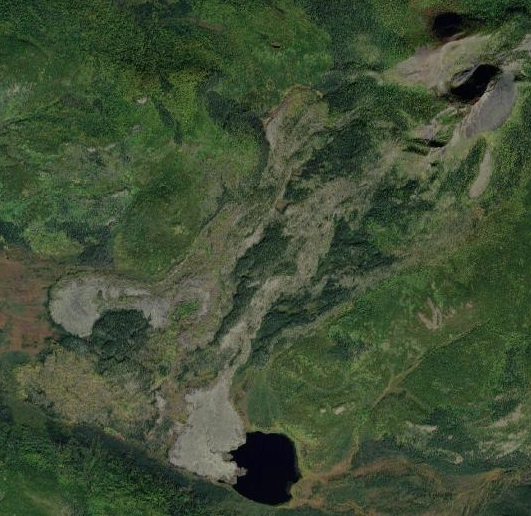
Satellite view of lava flows on the southwest side of Volcano Mountain.

The oldest known lava flow traveled 8 kilometres (5.0 mi) to the north of its vent and had a landslide associated with it. It dammed a stream to create Caitlin Pond. Sediment core data from the pond shows it was dammed sometime before 7300 years ago.

The southwestern side of the mountain has at least five separate lava flows along with additional landslide debris. The youngest lava flows on the southwest side traveled 3 kilometres (1.9 mi) from their vent and dammed Leech Lake.

A more recent flow originated in the central vent and flowed to the northeast, not reaching beyond the edge of the earlier northern landslide area. Pyroclastic debris from this event have been found on the volcano's crater floor.

Lava flows from Volcano Mountain exhibit features common in other lava flows, such as lava tubes. Vegetation has been slow to grow on the lava flows because of the climate and northerly latitude of the region.

== Volcanic hazards ==
Future eruptions from Volcano Mountain would probably be lava flows, since there is a lack of pyroclastic material. The main hazards from Volcano Mountain are forest fires started by the lava flows and poisonous gases. Older volcanic deposits south of Volcano Mountain indicate that lava flows may have once partly blocked or at least altered the course of the Yukon and Pelly Rivers.

Specific hazards at Volcano Mountain and other volcanoes in Yukon are poorly understood. Their remote location lead to a lack of detailed geologic maps, research to determine past eruption dates, and real-time monitoring infrastructure such as seismographs. A review of Canadian volcanoes published in 2024 assessed the entire Fort Selkirk Volcanic Field under the "very low" threat category because of the primary eruptive style and relative isolation from population centres.

== See also ==
- List of Northern Cordilleran volcanoes
- List of volcanoes in Canada
- Volcanism in Canada
