= Dark Mountain =

Mountain in British Columbia, Canada

- Location within British Columbia
- Interactive map of Dark Mountain

Highest point
- Elevation: 1,974 m (6,476 ft)
- Prominence: 389 m (1,276 ft)
- Listing: List of volcanoes in Canada
- Coordinates: 58°38′7.1″N 129°26′21.1″W

Geography
- Location: British Columbia, Canada
- District: Cassiar Land District
- Parent range: border of Tanzilla Plateau (Stikine Plateau) & Cassiar Mountains
- Topo map: NTS 104I11 Hard Lake

Geology
- Mountain type: Subglacial mound
- Volcanic zone: Northern Cordilleran Volcanic Province
- Last eruption: Pleistocene

Dark Mountain, formerly also known as Black Mountain, is a mountain in the Tanzilla Plateau of the Northern Interior of British Columbia, Canada, located northeast of the settlement of Dease Lake, near Cry Lake.

Before 1937 Dark Mountain was known as Black Mountain. The Canadian Geological Survey recommended a name change to avoid confusion with several similarly named features, see Black Mountain (disambiguation).

== See also ==
- List of Northern Cordilleran volcanoes
- List of volcanoes in Canada
- Volcanic history of the Northern Cordilleran Volcanic Province
- Volcanism of Canada
- Volcanism of Western Canada
