= Klinkit Creek Peak =

Tuya in the country of Canada

Coordinates: 59.47°N 131.28°W

Klinkit Creek Peak is a tuya in northwestern British Columbia, Canada, located near Klinkit Lake. It lies in the Northern Cordilleran Volcanic Province and last erupted during the Pleistocene epoch.

== See also ==
- List of volcanoes in Canada
- List of Northern Cordilleran volcanoes
- Volcanism of Canada
- Volcanism of Western Canada
