= IGC Centre =

Lava dome in British Columbia, Canada

IGC Centre is a lava dome in Mount Edziza Provincial Park of northern British Columbia, Canada. It is thought to have formed and last erupted during the Miocene period.

== See also ==
- List of volcanoes in Canada
- List of Northern Cordilleran volcanoes
- Mount Edziza volcanic complex
- Volcanism of Canada
- Volcanism of Western Canada
