= Mushroom (lava flow) =

Highest point
- Coordinates: 62.80°N 137.45°W

Geography
- Location: Yukon, Canada
- Parent range: Yukon Ranges

Geology
- Rock age: Pliocene
- Mountain type: Lava flow
- Last eruption: Pliocene

The Mushroom is the name of a lava flow located in the Yukon Territory that was erupted during the Pliocene period in the Northern Cordilleran Volcanic Province.

== See also ==
- Volcanism of Canada
- Volcanism of Western Canada
- List of volcanoes in Canada
- Northern Cordilleran Volcanic Province
