= Source Hill =

Cinder cone in British Columbia, Canada

Coordinates: 57.28°N 130.82°W

Source Hill is a cinder cone in northwestern British Columbia, Canada. It is polygenetic in nature, having erupted more than once throughout its eruptive history. It is one of the volcanoes in the central portion of the Mount Edziza volcanic complex and last erupted during the Pleistocene period.

== See also ==
- List of volcanoes in Canada
- List of Northern Cordilleran volcanoes
- Volcanology of Canada
- Volcanology of Western Canada
