= Watson Lake Cone =

Cinder cone in Yukon, in Canada

Watson Lake Cone is a cinder cone in southern Yukon, Canada, located near the British Columbia-Yukon border. It formed and last erupted during the Pleistocene period and is part of the Northern Cordilleran Volcanic Province.

== See also ==
- List of volcanoes in Canada
- List of Northern Cordilleran volcanoes
- Volcanism of Canada
- Volcanism of Northern Canada
