= Mount Sanford =

Mount Sanford may refer to:

- Mount Sanford (Alaska), a shield volcano in the Wrangell Volcanic Field, in eastern Alaska near the Copper River
- Mount Sanford (British Columbia), a mountain in northwestern British Columbia
- Mount Sanford (Connecticut), a mountain peak of the Metacomet Ridge in south-central Connecticut
