= Klastline =

Klastline may refer to:

- Klastline Cone, a volcanic cone in British Columbia, Canada
- Klastline Formation, a geological formation in British Columbia, Canada
- Klastline Plateau, a plateau in British Columbia, Canada
- Klastline River, a river in British Columbia, Canada
