= Thaw Hill =

Cinder cone in British Columbia

Thaw Hill is a cinder cone in northwestern British Columbia, Canada. It is one of the volcanoes in the central portion of the Mount Edziza volcanic complex and last erupted during the Pleistocene period.

== See also ==
- List of volcanoes in Canada
- List of Northern Cordilleran volcanoes
- Volcanology of Canada
- Volcanology of Western Canada
