= Icefall Cone =

Cinder cone in Canada

Coordinates: 57.70°N 130.60°W

Icefall Cone is a cinder cone in northern British Columbia, Canada. It is thought to have last erupted during the Holocene period and forms part of the Mount Edziza volcanic complex.

== See also ==
- List of volcanoes in Canada
- List of Northern Cordilleran volcanoes
- Volcanism of Canada
- Volcanism of Western Canada
