= Tanzilla Plateau =

Plateau in British Columbia, Canada

- Plateau
- Location within British Columbia
- Coordinates: 58°22′00″N 130°22′00″W
- Location: British Columbia
- Part of: Stikine Plateau

The Tanzilla Plateau is a plateau in the Stikine Country of the Northern Interior of British Columbia, Canada. It is a sub-plateau of the Stikine Plateau and is located east of the Tuya River, north of the Stikine River and surrounding Dease Lake; its eastern extremity verges on the Stikine Ranges of the Cassiar Mountains at Dark Mountain and Pyramid Mountain. The Spatsizi Plateau is to the southeast, the Klastline Plateau to the south, the Tahltan Highland to the west and southwest, and the Kawdy Plateau to the west and northwest. All are also sub-plateaus of the Stikine Plateau.

== Subranges ==
- French Range
- Hotailuh Range

== See also ==
- Tuya Volcanic Field
- Volcanism of Canada
- Volcanism of Western Canada
