= Prindle Volcano =

Cinder cone in Canada

Coordinates: 63°42′54″N 141°37′44″W

Prindle Volcano is an isolated basaltic cinder cone located in eastern Alaska, United States, in the headwaters of the East Fork of the Fortymile River, approximately 80 kilometers northeast of Tok, Alaska. The cone is fresh-looking and has a base approximately 900 metres (980 yards) wide. It is the northwesternmost expression of the Northern Cordilleran Volcanic Province. The cinder cone, and an approximately 11-kilometre (6.8-mile) long lava flow which breached the margin of the cone, erupted in the Pleistocene approximately 176,000 years ago. The lava flow extends to the southeast, then turns southwest and continues in a river valley.

Rocks forming the Prindle Volcano occur within, and penetrated through, the Yukon–Tanana upland which is a large region of mostly Paleozoic-Mesozoic metamorphosed and deformed sedimentary, volcanic, and intrusive rocks that are intruded by younger Cretaceous and Cenozoic granitic rocks. Xenoliths in the volcano's ejecta provide a sample of lower crust material.

== See also ==
- List of Northern Cordilleran volcanoes
- List of volcanoes in the United States
