= Pelly Formation =

Geological formation in Yukon, Canada

Coordinates: 62.80°N 137.5°W

The Pelly Formation, also referred to as the Pelly Sequence, is a geological formation in central Yukon, Canada. It consists of lava flows that have yielded ages of 1.28 ± 0.03 million years and 1.6 to 0.89 million years, indicating that they were erupted during the Pleistocene epoch. The Pelly Formation has a volume of approximately 15 km^{3} (3.6 mi^{3}) and is one of several volcanic features overlying the Yukon–Tanana and Stikinia terranes of northwestern North America. It is part of the Northern Cordilleran Volcanic Province and contains xenoliths composed of lherzolite, dunite, wehrlite or websterite.

== See also ==
- List of volcanoes in Canada
- Volcanism of Canada
- Volcanism of Northern Canada
