= Mess Lake Cone =

Cinder cone in British Columbia, Canada

Mess Lake Cone is a cinder cone in northwestern British Columbia, Canada. It is polygenetic in nature, meaning it has had more than one period of eruptions throughout its history. Mess Lake Cone is one of the volcanoes that produced young basaltic lava flows in the central portion of the Mount Edziza volcanic complex in the past 10,000 years. These basaltic lava flows form a north–south trending volcanic field called the Mess Lake Lava Field.

== See also ==
- List of volcanoes in Canada
- List of Northern Cordilleran volcanoes
- Volcanism of Canada
- Volcanism of Western Canada
