= Parallel Creek =

Watercourse in British Columbia, Canada

Coordinates: 59°30′51″N 130°47′27″W

Parallel Creek is a creek in northern British Columbia, Canada. It flows northwest into an expansion of the Jennings River.
