= Stóra-Björnsfell =

Mountain in Iceland

Coordinates: 64°30′N 20°42′W

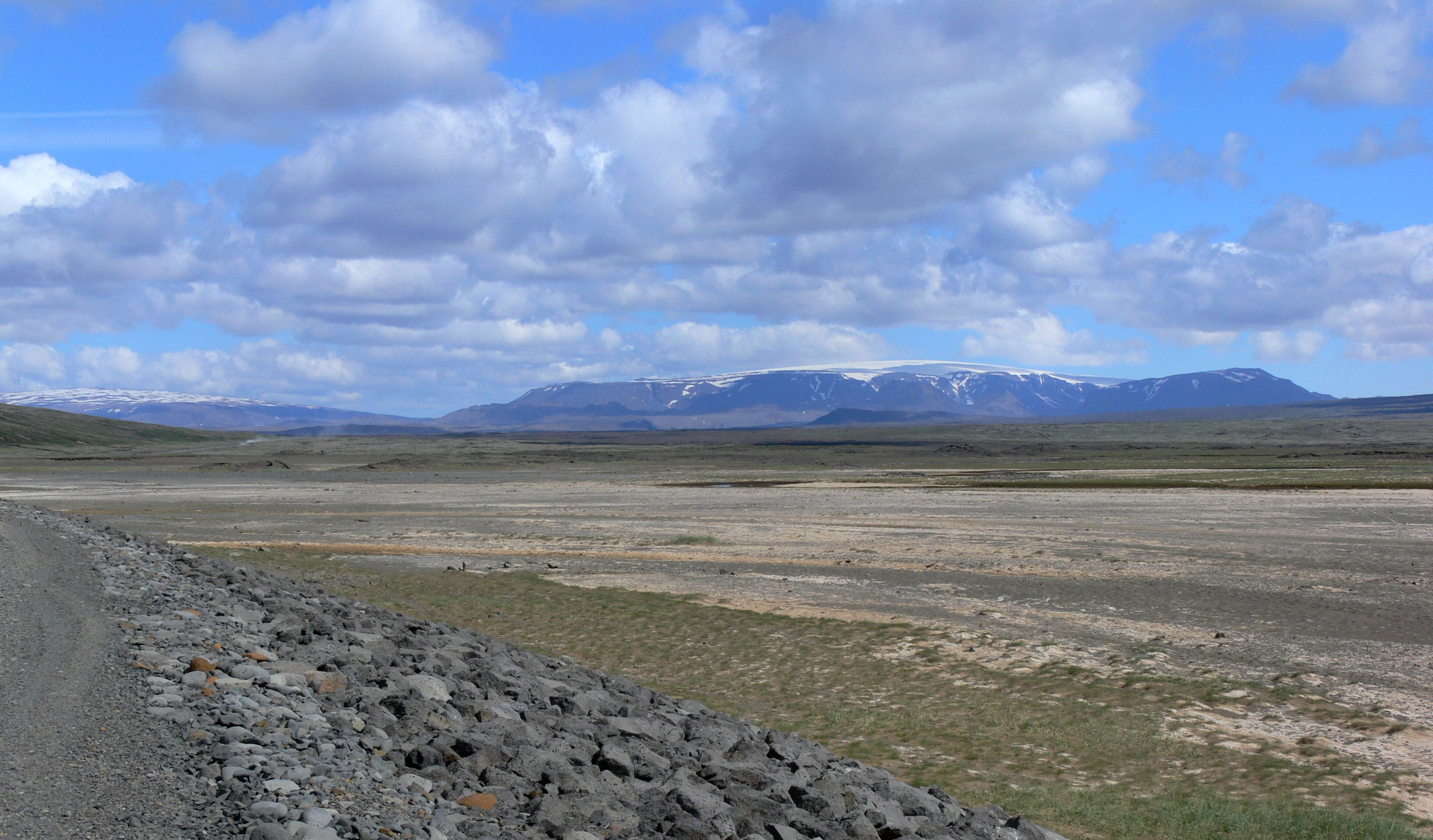
Stóra-Björnsfell to the right of Þórisjökull

Stóra-Björnsfell (Icelandic pronunciation: [ˈstouːra-ˈpjœr̥sˌfɛtl̥]) is an elongated medium-sized tuya located in Iceland. It contains pillow lava, hyaloclastite and sheet lava. The volcano formed when a subglacial eruption occurred beneath an ice sheet during the last ice age. Stóra-Björnsfell's pillow lava appears originally to have erupted from a fissure.

== See also ==
- Volcanism of Iceland
