= Atsutla Range =

Mountain range in British Columbia, Canada

- Location within British Columbia

Dimensions
- Area: 2,675 km^{2} (1,033 mi^{2})

Geography
- Country: Canada
- Province: British Columbia
- Range coordinates: 59°16′N 131°21′W
- Parent range: Kawdy Plateau
- Topo map: NTS 104O6 Tahoots Creek

The Atsutla Range is a granitic mountain range on the Kawdy Plateau in northern British Columbia, Canada. The Atsutla Range lies south of the Yukon border in between Teslin Lake and the Stewart-Cassiar Highway, roughly 120 km (75 mi) north-northeast of Dease Lake.
