= Tintina Fault =

Fault line in North America

The Tintina Fault is a large right-lateral strike-slip fault in western North America, extending from Flathead Lake, Montana, United States, through British Columbia and Yukon in Canada, and onto the eastern portion of the U.S. state of Alaska. It represents the Yukon continuum between the Rocky Mountain Trench in the northern contiguous United States and the Kaltag Fault in Alaska.

Unlike the Denali Fault, which ruptured a 200 km (120 mi) portion of its central segment during the 2002 Denali earthquake, the Tintina Fault is considered inactive. Despite this classification, researchers noted a magnitude 5.3 right-lateral event in 1972 and a relatively young (Holocene) 14 km (8.7 mi) scarp with a maximum offset of 2.5 m (8 ft 2 in). A 2025 study suggests that stress may be developing along the Tintina Fault which could produce a magnitude 7.5 or higher earthquake.

== See also ==
- Northern Cordilleran Volcanic Province
- Rocky Mountain Trench
