= Fort Selkirk volcanic field =

Volcanic field in the Yukon Territory, Canada

Highest point
- Elevation: 1,239 m (4,065 ft)
- Coordinates: 62.93°N 137.38°W

Geography
- Location: Yukon, Canada
- Parent range: Pacific Coast Ranges

Geology
- Rock age: Holocene?
- Mountain type: Monogenetic volcanic field
- Last eruption: Unknown

The Fort Selkirk volcanic field is a monogenetic volcanic field in the Northern Cordilleran Volcanic Province, Yukon Territory, Canada. It is the northernmost Holocene age volcanic field in Canada, located close to the connection of the Yukon and Pelly rivers. The youngest eruptions within the field are unknown. However, the youngest volcano Volcano Mountain produced lava flows that appear to be only a few hundred years old.

== See also ==
- Volcanism in Canada
- List of Northern Cordilleran volcanoes
- List of volcanoes in Canada
- List of volcanic fields
