= Subglacial mound =

Volcano formed when lava erupts beneath a thick glacier or ice sheet

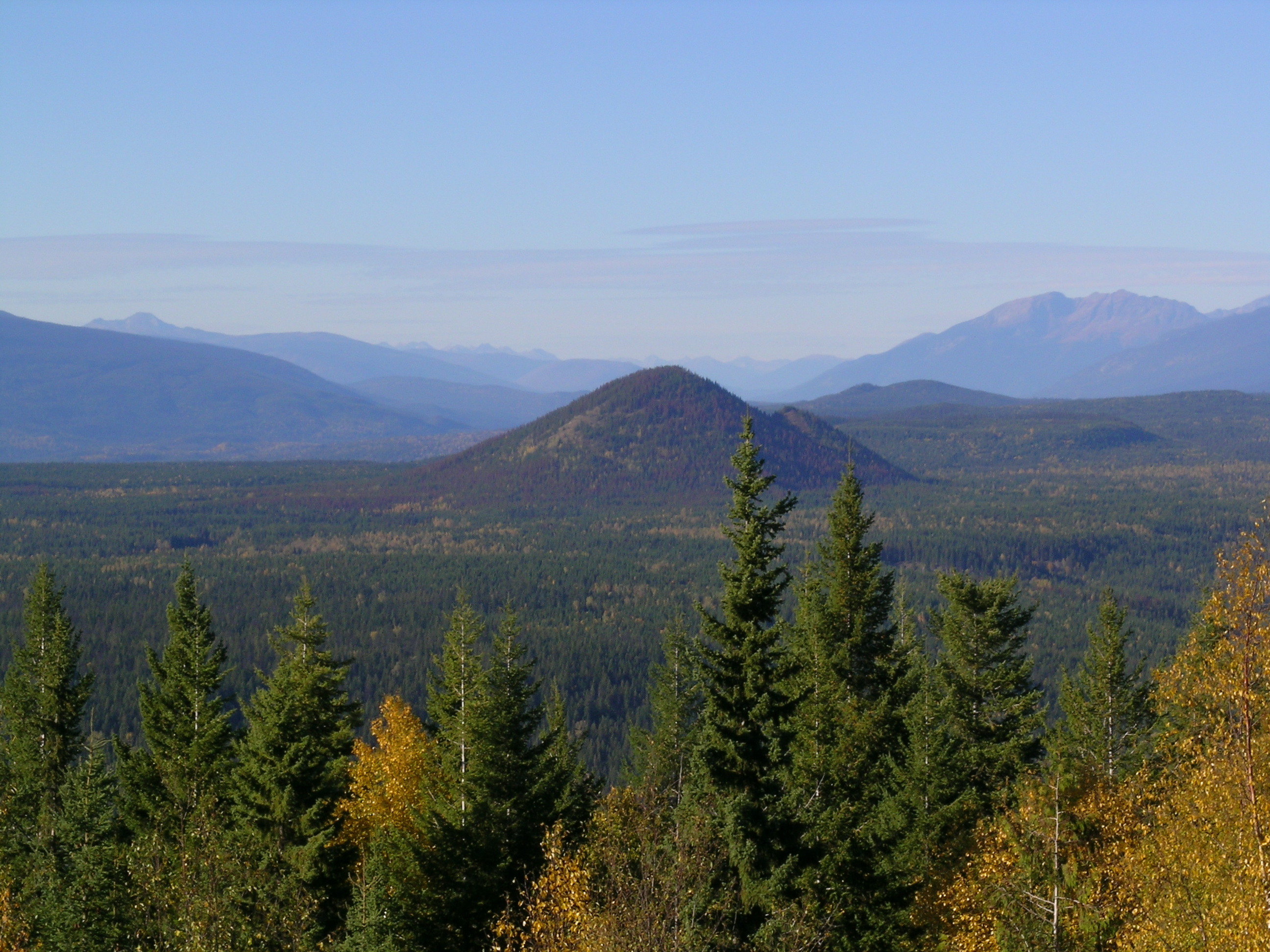
Pyramid Mountain, a subglacial mound in British Columbia, Canada

A subglacial mound is a type of subglacial volcano formed when lava erupts beneath a thick glacier or ice sheet. The magma forming these volcanoes was not hot enough to melt a vertical pipe right through the overlying glacial ice, instead forming hyaloclastite and pillow lava deep beneath the glacial ice field. Once the glaciers had retreated, the subglacial volcano would be revealed, with a unique shape as a result of its confinement within glacial ice. They are somewhat rare worldwide, being confined to regions which were formerly covered by continental ice sheets and also had active volcanism during the same period. They are found throughout Iceland, Antarctica and the Canadian province of British Columbia.

Subglacial mounds can be mistaken for cinder cones because they may have a similar shape. An example of this confusion is Pyramid Mountain in the Wells Gray-Clearwater volcanic field of east-central British Columbia, Canada.
