= Northern Cordilleran Volcanic Province =

Geologic province in the Pacific Northwest of North America

Northern Cordilleran Volcanic Province NCVP
- Geologic province
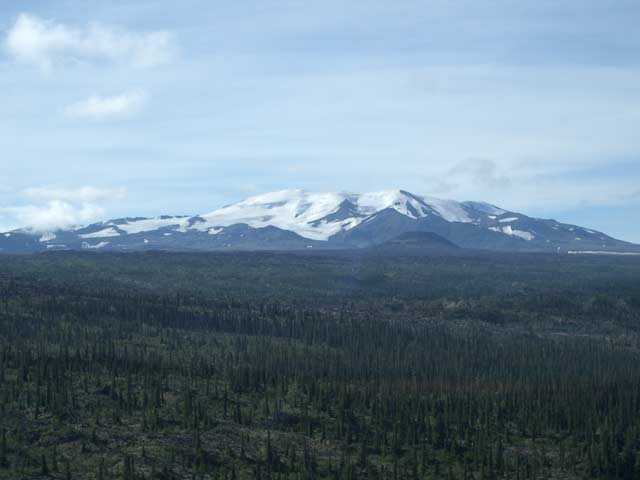
- Mount Edziza, a stratovolcano in the province

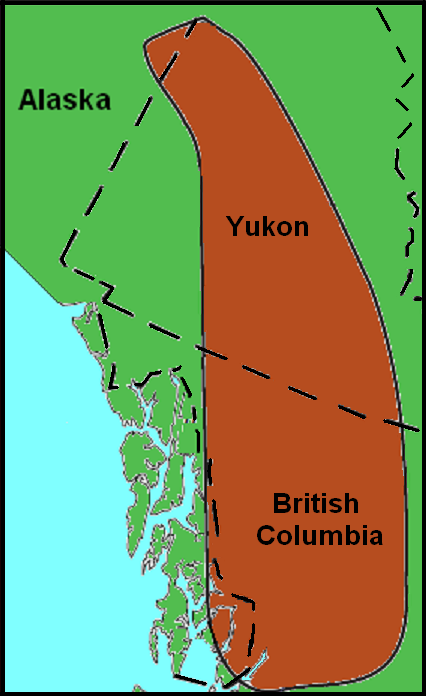
- Map of northwestern North America. The Northern Cordilleran Volcanic Province is highlighted brown.
- Location: British Columbia, Canada

The Northern Cordilleran Volcanic Province (NCVP), formerly known as the Stikine Volcanic Belt, is a geologic province defined by the occurrence of Miocene to Holocene volcanoes in the Pacific Northwest of North America. This belt of volcanoes extends roughly north-northwest from northwestern British Columbia and the Alaska Panhandle through Yukon to the Southeast Fairbanks Census Area of far eastern Alaska, in a corridor hundreds of kilometres wide. It is the most recently defined volcanic province in the Western Cordillera. It has formed due to extensional cracking of the North American continent—similar to other on-land extensional volcanic zones, including the Basin and Range Province and the East African Rift. Although taking its name from the Western Cordillera, this term is a geologic grouping rather than a geographic one. The southernmost part of the NCVP has more, and larger, volcanoes than does the rest of the NCVP; further north it is less clearly delineated, describing a large arch that sways westward through central Yukon.

At least four large volcanoes are grouped with the Northern Cordilleran Volcanic Province, including Hoodoo Mountain in the Boundary Ranges, the Mount Edziza volcanic complex on the Tahltan Highland, and Level Mountain and Heart Peaks on the Nahlin Plateau. These four volcanoes have volumes of more than 15 km^{3} (3.6 mi^{3}), the largest and oldest which is Level Mountain with an area of 1,800 km^{2} (690 mi^{2}) and a volume of more than 860 km^{3} (210 mi^{3}). Apart from the large volcanoes, several smaller volcanoes exist throughout the Northern Cordilleran Volcanic Province, including cinder cones which are widespread throughout the volcanic zone. Most of these small cones have been sites of only one volcanic eruption; this is in contrast to the larger volcanoes throughout the volcanic zone, which have had more than one volcanic eruption throughout their history.

The Northern Cordilleran Volcanic Province is part of an area of intensive earthquake and volcanic activity around the Pacific Ocean called the Pacific Ring of Fire. However, the Northern Cordilleran Volcanic Province is commonly interpreted to be part of a gap in the Pacific Ring of Fire between the Cascade Volcanic Arc further south and the Aleutian Arc further north. But the Northern Cordilleran Volcanic Province is recognized to include over 100 independent volcanoes that have been active in the past 1.8 million years. At least three of them have erupted in the past 360 years, making it the most active volcanic area in Canada. Nevertheless, the dispersed population within the volcanic zone has witnessed few eruptions due to remoteness and the infrequent volcanic activity.

== Geology ==
=== Origins and chemistry ===
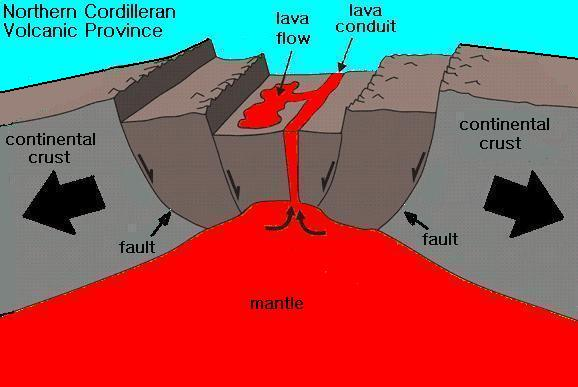
The Northern Cordilleran Volcanic Province rift

The Northern Cordilleran Volcanic Province has been a zone of active volcanism since it began to form 20 million years ago. Unlike other parts of the Pacific Ring of Fire, the Northern Cordilleran Volcanic Province has its origins in continental rifting—an area where the Earth's crust and lithosphere is being pulled apart. This differs from other portions of the Pacific Ring of Fire as it consists largely of volcanic arcs formed by subducting oceanic crust at oceanic trenches along continental margins circling the Pacific Ocean. The continental crust at the Northern Cordilleran Volcanic Province is being stretched at a rate of about 2 cm (1 in) per year. This incipient rifting formed as a result of the Pacific Plate sliding northward along the Queen Charlotte Fault, on its way to the Aleutian Trench, which extends along the southern coastline of Alaska and the adjacent waters off the southern coast of the Kamchatka Peninsula. As a result, volcanism in the Northern Cordilleran Volcanic Province is also not related to back-arc basin volcanism. When the stored energy is suddenly released by slippage across the fault at irregular intervals, it can create very large earthquakes, such as the magnitude 8.1 Queen Charlotte Islands earthquake of 1949. As these far-field forces stretch the North American crust, the near surface rocks fracture along steeply dipping faults parallel to the rift zone. Hot magma rises between these fractures to create passive or effusive eruptions. Volcanoes within the Northern Cordilleran Volcanic Province are located along short northerly trending segments which in the northern part of the volcanic province are unmistakably involved with north-trending rift structures, including synvolcanic grabens and grabens with one major fault line along only one of the boundaries (half-grabens). Grabens are indicative of tensional forces and crustal stretching.

Two major north-trending faults hundreds of kilometres long extend along the Northern Cordilleran Volcanic Province. These two rock fractures, known as the Tintina and Denali fault systems, have been tectonically active since the Cretaceous period as strike-slip faults. The Denali fault to the west and the Tintina fault to the east are nearly 2,000 km (1,200 mi) long, extending from northern British Columbia to central Alaska. Other mechanisms suggested for triggering volcanism in the Northern Cordilleran Volcanic Province include mantle plumes, deglaciation and slab windows, although continental rifting is the most accurate mechanism for activating volcanism in the volcanic zone. Further evidence for continental rifting in the Northern Cordilleran Volcanic Province is magmas are mainly alkaline, it includes highly alkaline and peralkaline rock types, the main spatial-temporal pattern of volcanism is in the middle of the volcanic province followed by movement to the south, north and possibly northeast, heat flow in the Northern Cordilleran Volcanic Province is high, seismic activity is largely absent in the volcanic province and the largest period of volcanism correlates with an interval of net extension between the Pacific and North American plates.

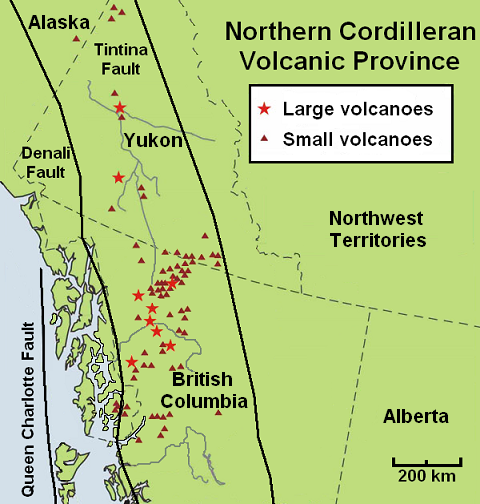
Minor and major volcanoes of the Northern Cordilleran Volcanic Province, including the Queen Charlotte, Denali and Tintina fault zones

A range of more heavily alkaline rock types not commonly found in the Western Cordillera are regionally widespread in the Northern Cordilleran Volcanic Province. These include nephelinite, basanite and peralkaline phonolite, trachyte, and comendite lavas. The most magnesium oxide-rich nephelinites, basanites and alkaline basalts all through the Northern Cordilleran Volcanic Province display trace element abundances and isotopic compositions that are logical with an asthenospheric source like those for average oceanic island basalt and for alkaline basalts younger than five million years in the rift-related Basin and Range Province of southwestern United States and northwestern Mexico. One hypothesized explanation for oceanic island basalt in the Earth's upper mantle under the Northern Cordilleran Volcanic Province is the existence of a slab window. However, not much of a noticeable evidence linking the production of magma in the upper mantle to a possible tectonic system has been stated.

The existence of a fault next to the western flank of the Mount Edziza volcanic complex is normally considered to be the prime structural evidence for continental rifting in the Northern Cordilleran Volcanic Province. However, more recent mapping and seismic studies in the Coast Mountains have documented the presence of brittle rift-related faults southwest of the small community of Stewart in northwestern British Columbia. But these faults were in a matter of dispute in 1997 by geologists, stating these faults were last active between 20 and five million years ago. In 1999, a sequence of north-trending faults were mapped that seem to represent young rifting events parallel with the southwestern boundary of the Northern Cordilleran Volcanic Province. These rift-related faults might have been active as recently as five million years ago and they might have connections with adjacent Miocene and younger volcanic activity in the southern part of the Northern Cordilleran Volcanic Province. In addition, brittle faults with similar north-trending directions might enlarge as far north as the fault next to the western flank of the Mount Edziza volcanic complex. These tectonic events might have helped form the structure the Northern Cordilleran Volcanic Province.

Subduction beside the northern portion of the Western Cordillera deceased between 43 and 40 million years ago. This finally caused the formation of a slab window under the northern portion of the Western Cordillera 10 million years ago, supporting an entrance to relatively undepleted upper mantle. A switch in relative plate motions at the Queen Charlotte Fault 10 million years ago produced consequent strain throughout the northern portion of the Western Cordillera, resulting in crustal thinning and decompression melting of oceanic island basalt-like mantle to create alkaline volcanism. Several plate motion models indicate a rebound to net compression throughout the Queen Charlotte Fault sometime after four million years ago. Although extensive rifting has not yet been recognized in the Northern Cordilleran Volcanic Province, volcanism throughout the past 1.6 million years is possibly due to repetitive upper mantle upwelling and adjacent transtension throughout the Queen Charlotte Fault, accommodated partly by numerous east–west trending fault zones that extend all through the Northern Cordilleran Volcanic Province.

The volcanics comprising the Northern Cordilleran Volcanic Province are consistent with the rifting environment. Alkaline basalt, lesser hawaiite and basanite magmas from effusive eruptions create the massive shield volcanoes and small cinder cones throughout the volcanic province, several of which comprise lherzolite magma. Felsic magmas from more viscous eruptions create the massive central volcanoes and largely consist of trachyte, pantellerite and comendite lavas. These felsic volcanics are understood to have been created by fractionation of mainly alkali basalt magma in crustal reservoirs. An area of continental rifting, such as the Northern Cordilleran Volcanic Province, would aid the formation of high-level reservoirs of capable size and thermal activity to maintain long-lived fractionation.

=== Lithosphere thickness ===
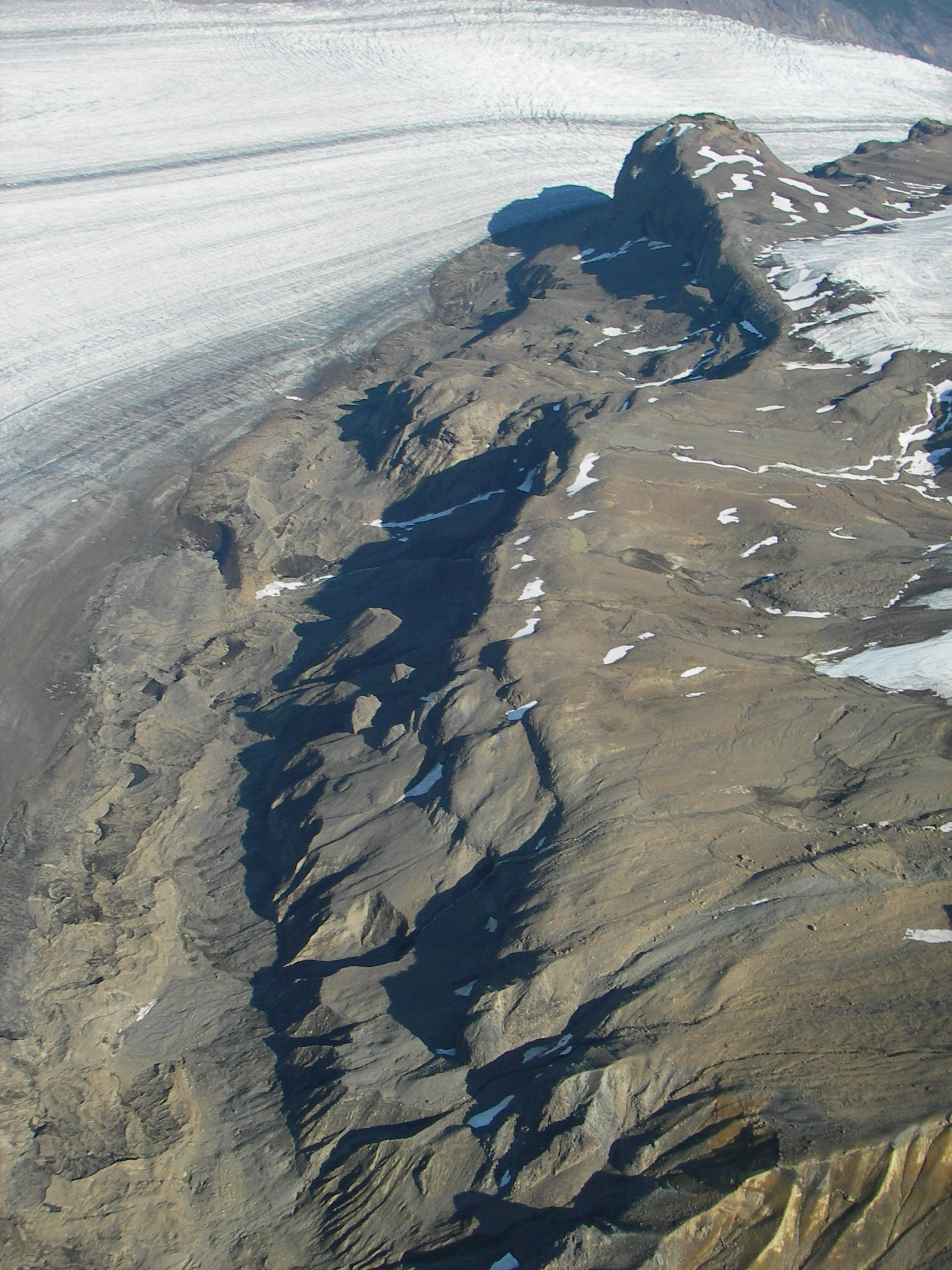
Lava flows exposed on the flanks of Hoodoo Mountain.

The variety of different temperature ranges from xenoliths throughout the Northern Cordilleran Volcanic Province indicate that a narrow lithosphere lies under the northern portion of the volcanic province and a more dense lithosphere lies under the southern portion of the volcanic province. This indication is further provided if the geothermal gradient inside the lithosphere under the northern portion of the Northern Cordilleran Volcanic Province is greater than that in the southern portion of the province. A greater geothermal gradient would indicate that a xenolith recording a temperature of 900 °C (1,650 °F) was collected from a shallower depth than one from a zone with a reduced geothermal gradient that also records a temperature of 900 °C (1,650 °F).

Further evidence that indicate lithospheric thickening beneath the middle portion of Stikinia include the increased profusion of cognate inclusion and plagioclase megacrysts in volcanic rocks from the southern portion of the volcanic province, which might be evidence of magma ponding and magma crystallization in the lithosphere before a volcanic eruption, and the restricted existence of petrologically evolved rock types in the southern half of the Northern Cordilleran Volcanic Province. If the developed magmas originated from fractionation of mafic magmas, fractionation associated with lithospheric contamination, or entirely from melting of the associated lithosphere, their existence suggests more dense lithosphere lies under the southern portion of the Northern Cordilleran Volcanic Province.

In the Llangorse section of the Atlin Volcanic Field in northwestern British Columbia, a suite of xenoliths confines the thickness of the Northern Cordilleran Volcanic Province mantle lithosphere to as thin as 18 km (11 mi) and a thickness no more than 39 km (24 mi). Analysis of recent data related to earthquakes in the southwestern portion of the volcanic province indicates that the crust under Stikinia, which comprises the bedrock underlying a large number of volcanoes in the southern portion of the Northern Cordilleran Volcanic Province, is also more dense than the crust under the nearby Coast Plutonic Complex, which consists of a broad belt of granitic and dioritic intrusive rocks that collectively represent more than 140 million years of nearly continuous subduction-related magmatism.

=== Geological features ===
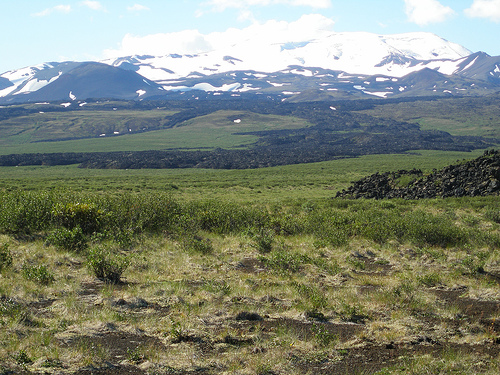
Lava flows erupted from the flanks of Mount Edziza.

Hot springs are present throughout the Northern Cordilleran Volcanic Province, indicating magmatic heat is present under the Northern Cordilleran Volcanic Province. They are formed if water percolates deeply through the crust and heats up from the primal magmatic heat under the surface. After the groundwater is heated, the heated groundwater rises to the surface as a hot spring. In some cases, the heated groundwater may rise along extensional faults related to rifting in the Northern Cordilleran Volcanic Province. The Lakelse Hot Springs near Lakelse Lake Provincial Park in northern British Columbia is interpreted to be one such example. With a temperature of 89 °C (192 °F), the springs are the hottest in Canada. It is also possible the magma associated with the Nass Valley eruption 250 years ago to the north rose along the same north trending fault lines fueling the Lakelse Hot Springs. Hot springs are also present in Iskut River Hot Springs Provincial Park and Choquette Hot Springs Provincial Park in northwestern British Columbia.

Xenoliths, rock fragments that become enveloped in a larger igneous rock, are widespread in the Northern Cordilleran Volcanic Province. Xenoliths that originated in the Earth's crust include rich metamorphic rocks and felsic intrusive rocks. Granulite xenoliths exist mainly at the Fort Selkirk Volcanic Field in central Yukon, Prindle Volcano in easternmost Alaska and at Castle Rock and the Iskut River in northern British Columbia. Felsic intrusive xenoliths are a lot more common and usually originate from adjacent granitic intrusions, including those that form the Coast Mountains. More than 14 volcanic zones throughout the Northern Cordilleran Volcanic Province comprise xenoliths that originated from the Earth's mantle and are located mainly at the Yukon–Tanana terrane, the Cache Creek terrane and at volcanoes occupying the Paleozoic and Mesozoic Stikinia terrane. They consist of lherzolite, harzburgite, wehrlite, dunite, websterite and garnet composed pyroxenite. The highest and lowest temperatures recorded by mantle xenoliths increase to the south and decrease to the north. Mantle xenoliths at Prindle Volcano in easternmost Alaska record the minimum temperature of 860 °C (1,580 °F) and mantle xenoliths from the Fort Selkirk Volcanic Field in central Yukon record the minimum temperature range from 960 to 1,050 °C (1,760 to 1,920 °F). At Castle Rock in northern British Columbia, mantle xenoliths record the maximum temperature of 1,260 °C (2,300 °F), as well as the maximum temperature range from 1,000 to 1,260 °C (1,830 to 2,300 °F). The minimum xenolith temperatures indicate that the boundary between the Earth's crust and mantle is shallowest beneath the northern portion of the Northern Cordilleran Volcanic Province. Therefore, the temperature ranges for the northernmost xenolith series is about one-half the temperature range found in xenoliths at the southern portion of the volcanic province.

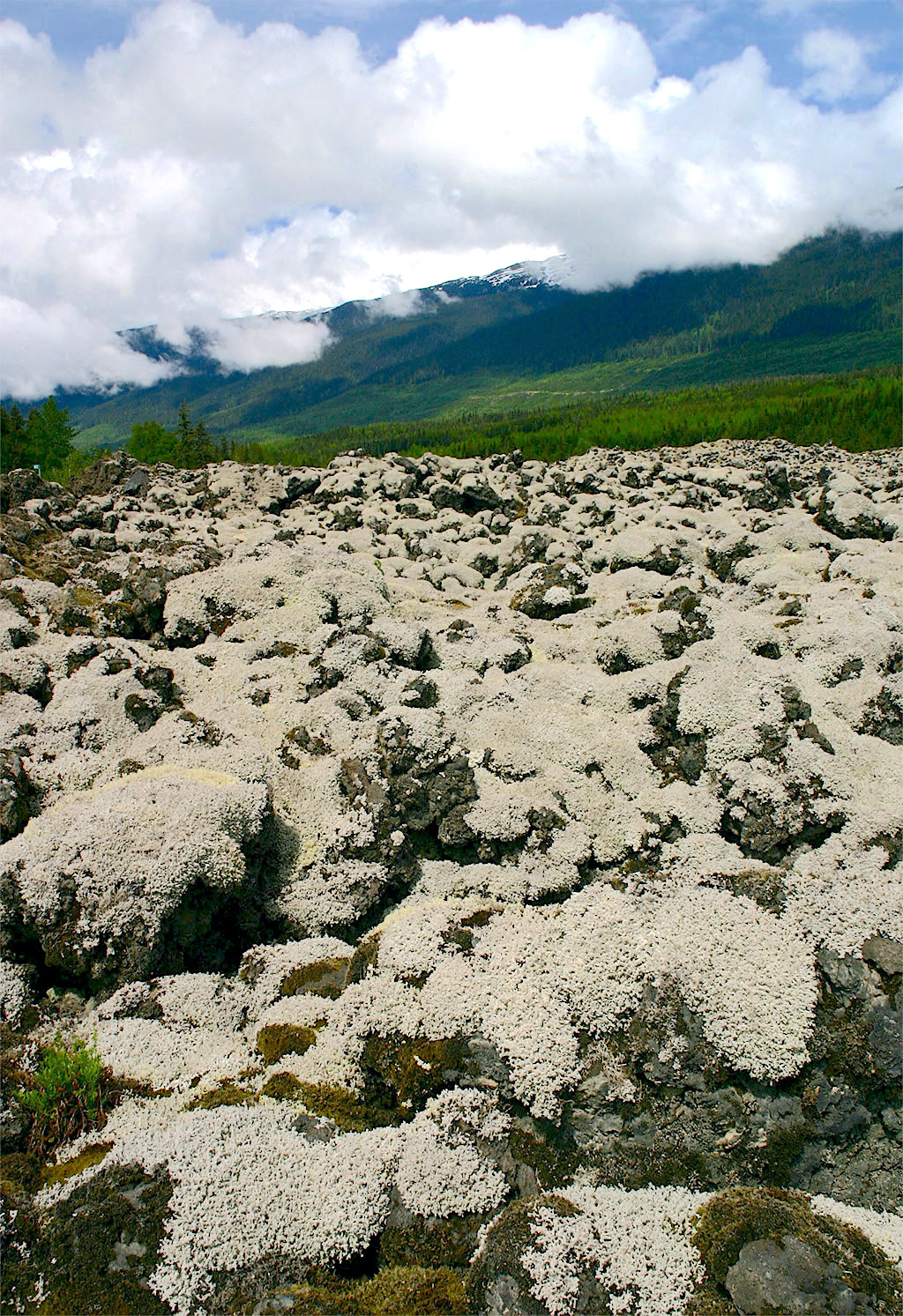
The landscape of a basaltic lava field in Nisga'a Memorial Lava Beds Provincial Park

Megacrysts, crystals or grains that are considerably larger than the encircling matrix, are commonly found in lava flows throughout the Northern Cordilleran Volcanic Province. They consist of three different groups, including kaersutitic amphibole megacrysts, clinopyroxene megacrysts and plagioclase megacrysts. Megacrysts made of kaersutite are known to be found mainly at Llangorse Mountain in northern British Columbia. Black glassy clinopyroxene megacrysts are widespread throughout the Northern Cordilleran Volcanic Province, suggesting their creation is independent of lithosphere structure. In contrast, clear glassy plagioclase megacrysts are found largely at the southern end of the Northern Cordilleran Volcanic Province and largely within the boundaries of the Stikinia terrane. This suggests the plagioclase megacrysts have a source that is sensitive to the Earth's lithosphere, including contamination or magma ponding. Megacrysts made of plagioclase and clinopyroxene regionally show significant evidence of reaction with the associated magma, including sieve-textured cores and random, resorbed and embayed outer margins wherever they are located.

Lava tubes are widespread in the Northern Cordilleran Volcanic Province, and are typically basaltic in composition. At Level Mountain, lava tubes reach diameters of 1 m (3.3 ft) to 2 m (6.6 ft). These owed their origin to highly fluid lavas with temperatures of at least 1,200 °C (2,190 °F). In Nisga'a Memorial Lava Beds Provincial Park of northwestern British Columbia, lava tubes are present that were formed during one of Canada's most recent volcanic eruptions in the 18th century. Lava Fork at the British Columbia-Alaska border is influenced by lava flows from a recent volcanic eruption that later collapsed into underlying lava tubes after the lava solidified. Sections of these collapsed lava tubes now form volcanic pits.

Extensive areas of nearly flat-lying lava flows throughout the Northern Cordilleran Volcanic Province can cover areas of at least 100 km^{2} (39 mi^{2}) and are generally composed of highly-fluid basaltic lava. However, lava plains that pre-date the last glacial period have been eroded and overridden by glacial ice, affording a less distinctive form to these older landforms. For example, lava beds at least a million years old in central Yukon contain unconsolidated glacial deposits that were deposited when glacial ice rode on top of the lava flows comprising the lava beds.

Subvolcanic intrusions in the Northern Cordilleran Volcanic Province are exposed in areas of high relief. This includes volcanic plugs found at the Mount Edziza volcanic complex, Level Mountain, Hoodoo Mountain and in the Atlin and Maitland areas. Volcanic plugs in the Atlin and Maitland areas consist of olivine nephelinite and basanite magmas. Minor plugs made of gabbroic and granitic magma are associated with volcanic stratigraphy at the Mount Edziza volcanic complex and Level Mountain.

=== Terranes and boundaries ===
The bedrock of the Northern Cordilleran Volcanic Province consists of four large terranes, known as Stikinia, Cache Creek, Yukon–Tanana and Cassiar. Stikinia is a sequence of late Paleozoic and Mesozoic aged volcanic, plutonic and sedimentary rocks interpreted to have been created in an island arc environment that were later placed along a pre-existing continental margin. The Cache Creek terrane is believed to have formed widely in a pre-existing oceanic basin. It comprises late Paleozoic to Mesozoic aged oceanic melange and abyssal peridotites intruded by younger granitic intrusions. The Yukon–Tanana and Cassiar terranes consist of shifted sedimentary and metamorphic rocks that were derived from the North American continent.

The southern boundary of the Northern Cordilleran Volcanic Province is parallel with southwestern Stikinia and is characterized by separate volcanic vents and erosional remains of lavas south of the small community of Stewart. The southern boundary of the Northern Cordilleran Volcanic Province also parallels with a gap in modern volcanism and the supposed northern boundary of the Cascadia subduction zone, defined by the eastward extension of the northern edge of the subducting Juan de Fuca Plate. These two zones divide the Northern Cordilleran Volcanic Province from modern volcanic zones further south, including the broad Chilcotin Plateau, the east–west trending Anahim Volcanic Belt and the monogenetic Wells Gray-Clearwater volcanic field in the British Columbia Interior. The eastern boundary of the Northern Cordilleran Volcanic Province is bounded by the Cassiar terrane and is adjoined by a cluster of volcanic plugs in central British Columbia. The northern and western boundaries are adjoined by the Yukon–Tanana and Cache Creek terranes where there lies volcanics in eastern Alaska and weathered remains of lava flows just north and west of Dawson City in west-central Yukon.

=== Tintina and Denali fault zones ===
The Tintina and Denali faults are the largest fault zones associated with the Northern Cordilleran Volcanic Province rift zone, with all volcanism occurring west of the Tintina Fault and east of the Denali Fault. Physiographically, the Tintina Fault forms the Northern Rocky Mountain Trench and the Tintina Trench, which is the northern extension of the Northern Rocky Mountain Trench. The fastest rates of strike-slip movement along the Tintina Fault likely occurred during two pulses in the Mid-Cretaceous and early Cenozoic periods, respectively, with the latter probably occurring during the Eocene epoch. Since the Cretaceous, the Tintina Fault has offset 450 km (280 mi) of the surface, although some evidence suggest as much as 1,200 km (750 mi) of offset. The offset caused the Northern Cordilleran Volcanic Province and the terrains of which the volcanic province occupies to move northwards. In the context of plate tectonics, strip-slip movement of the Tintina Fault is also related to strike-slip movement along the San Andreas Fault and other extensional or strike-slip fault systems of western North America.

To the west, the Denali Fault is the source of minor earthquakes that extend along the length of the fault. In contrast to the Tintina Fault, strike-slip movement along the Denali Fault has offset at least 370 km (230 mi) of the surface. The fault separates mountains of the Insular Belt from mountains east of the fault. Tectonic events in the Insular Belt are also related to movement along the Denali Fault.

== Human history ==
The term Stikine Volcanic Belt was originally defined by Jack Souther and Christopher Yorath of the Geological Survey of Canada in 1991 as a group of volcanic deposits centered around the Stikine River in northwestern British Columbia. As more mapping and dating of volcanic deposits was completed in the Western Cordillera, the Stikine Volcanic Belt was expanded to include volcanic deposits further and further from the geographic area associated with the name Stikine. In part for this reason, scientists Ben Edwards and James Russell redefined this area of volcanism as the Northern Cordilleran Volcanic Province. As a geographic descriptor, application of the name Stikine to volcanic rocks exposed along the Yukon River seems a bit odd and confusing. As well, a much older group of totally unrelated volcanic rocks comprise the Stikine Assemblage, which also mainly occurs within the geographic area informally referred to as Stikine Country. The Northern Cordilleran Volcanic Province is a broader name, to encompass a broader geographic area, in which the most recent volcanism has a similar character (mainly alkaline, mafic volcanic rocks), a similar age range (Miocene to Holocene), and a similar tectonic setting (transtension).

== See also ==
- Geology of the Pacific Northwest
- List of Northern Cordilleran volcanoes
- List of volcanoes in Canada
- List of volcanoes in the United States
- Volcanic history of the Northern Cordilleran Volcanic Province
- Volcanology of Canada
- Volcanology of Northern Canada
- Volcanology of Western Canada
