= Volcanism of Western Canada =

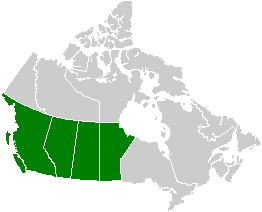
Western Canada, defined politically.

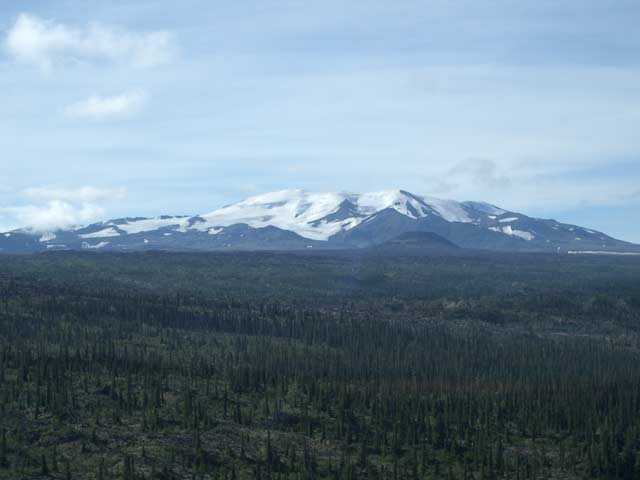
Mount Edziza in northern British Columbia

Volcanism of Western Canada has produced lava flows, lava plateaus, lava domes, cinder cones, stratovolcanoes, shield volcanoes, greenstone belts, submarine volcanoes, calderas, diatremes and maars, along with examples of more less common volcanic forms such as tuyas and subglacial mounds.

== Volcanic belts ==
- Anahim Volcanic Belt – Chain of volcanoes and related magmatic features in British Columbia, Canada
- Alert Bay Volcanic Belt – Geologic formation in British Columbia, Canada
- Bird River greenstone belt
- Chilcotin Group – Large area of basaltic lava in south-central British Columbia, Canada
- Flin Flon greenstone belt – Precambrian greenstone belt (rock formation) in Canada
- Garibaldi Volcanic Belt – Volcanic chain in southwestern British Columbia, Canada
- Northern Cordilleran Volcanic Province – Geologic province in the Pacific Northwest of North America
- Pemberton Volcanic Belt – Volcanic belt in British Columbia, Canada
- Winnipegosis Komatiite Belt

== Volcanic fields ==
- Wells Gray-Clearwater volcanic field – Volcanic field in British Columbia, Canada
- Buffalo Head Hills kimberlite field – Cluster of volcanic pipes in Canada
- Birch Mountains kimberlite field – Cluster of volcanic pipes in Canada

== See also ==
- Volcanism of Canada – Volcanic activity in Canada
- Volcanism of Eastern Canada – Volcanic activity in Eastern Canada
- Volcanism of Northern Canada – History of volcanic activity in Northern Canada
- List of volcanoes in Canada
