= Volcanism of Canada =

Volcanic activity in Canada

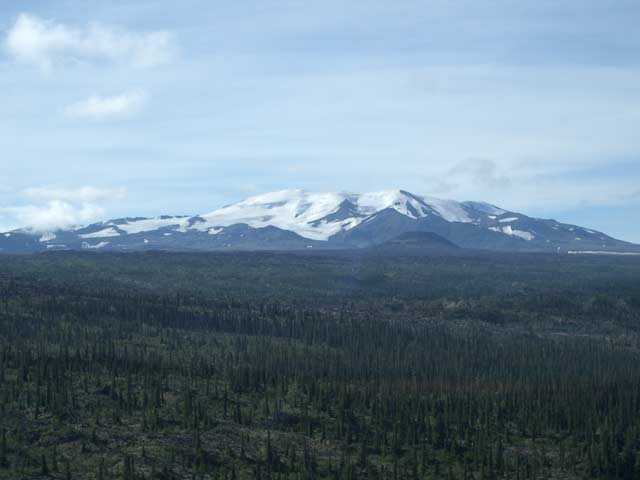
Mount Edziza, a stratovolcano in northwestern British Columbia

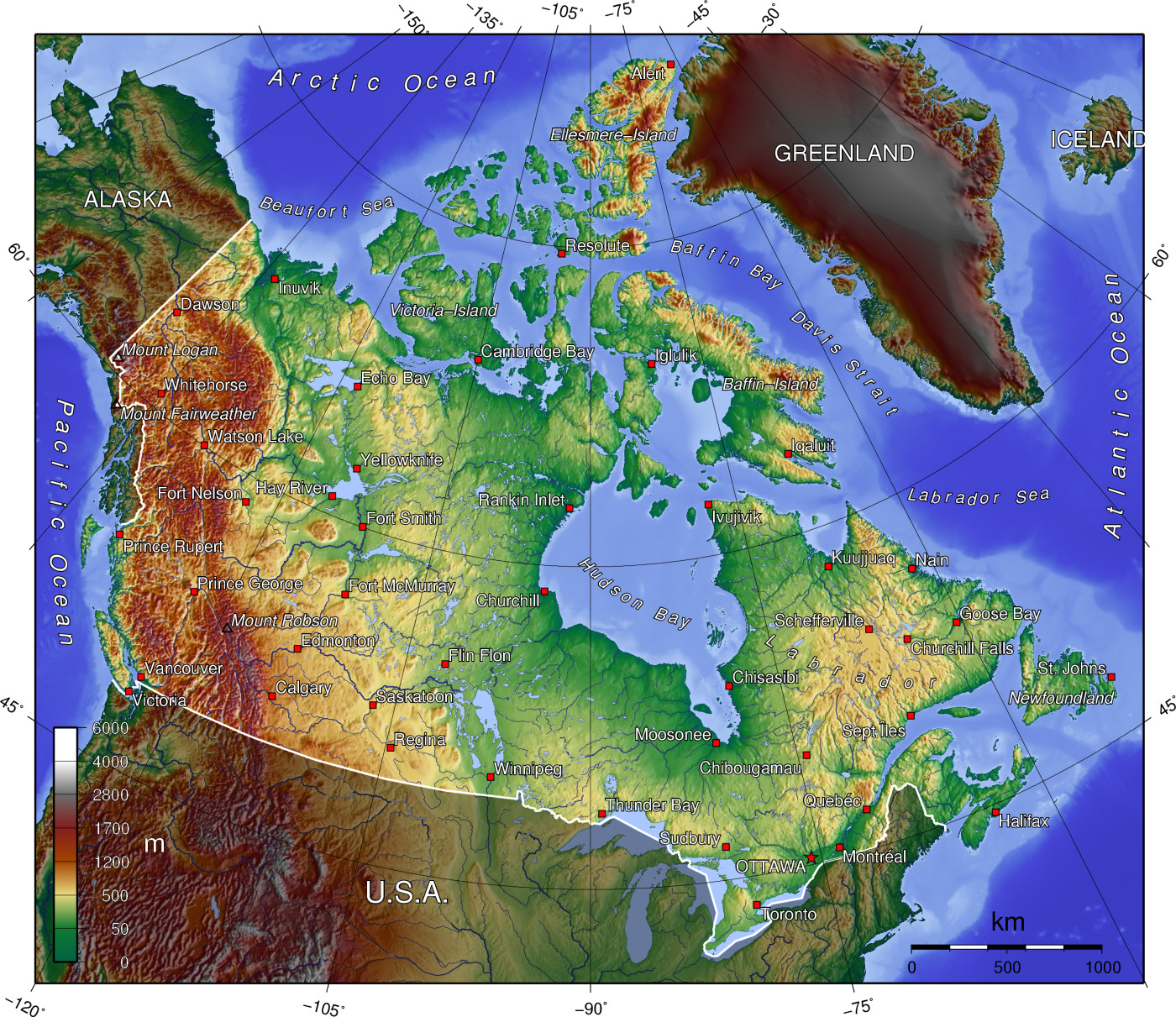
A topographic map of Canada, showing elevations shaded from green (lower) to brown (higher)

Volcanic activity is a major part of the geology of Canada and is characterized by many types of volcanic landform, including lava flows, volcanic plateaus, lava domes, cinder cones, stratovolcanoes, shield volcanoes, submarine volcanoes, calderas, diatremes, and maars, along with less common volcanic forms such as tuyas and subglacial mounds.

Though Canada's volcanic history dates back to the Precambrian eon, at least 3.11 billion years ago, when its part of the North American continent began to form, volcanism continues to occur in Western and Northern Canada in modern times, where it forms part of an encircling chain of volcanoes and frequent earthquakes around the Pacific Ocean called the Pacific Ring of Fire. Because volcanoes in Western and Northern Canada are in relatively remote and sparsely populated areas and their activity is less frequent than with other volcanoes around the Pacific Ocean, Canada is commonly thought to occupy a gap in the Ring of Fire between the volcanoes of the western United States to the south and the Aleutian volcanoes of Alaska to the north. Even so, the mountainous landscapes of the Canadian provinces of Alberta, British Columbia, Yukon, and the Northwest Territories include more than 100 volcanoes that have been active during the past two million years and whose eruptions have claimed many lives.

Volcanic activity is responsible for many of Canada's geological and geographical features and mineralization, including the nucleus of the North American continent, known as the Canadian Shield. Volcanism has led to the formation of hundreds of volcanic areas and extensive lava formations across Canada. The country's different volcano and lava types originate from different tectonic settings and types of volcanic eruptions, ranging from passive lava eruptions to violent explosive eruptions. Canada has a rich record of very large volumes of magmatic rock called large igneous provinces, represented by deep-level plumbing systems consisting of giant dike swarms, sill provinces and layered intrusions. The most capable large igneous provinces in Canada are Archean greenstone belts estimated at 3.8 to 2.5 billion years old, containing a rare volcanic rock called komatiite.

== Eruption styles and volcano formations ==
Eruption types and examples
Hawaiian eruptions	Hawaiian eruption: 1: ash plume, 2: lava fountain, 3: crater, 4: lava lake, 5: fumaroles, 6: lava flow, 7: layers of lava and ash, 8: stratum, 9: sill, 10: magma conduit, 11: magma chamber, 12: dike	Main article: Hawaiian eruption Hawaiian eruptions are passive eruptions characterized by effusive emission of highly fluid basalt lavas with low gas contents. Like other Hawaiian eruptions, the relative volume of ejected pyroclastic material is less than that of all other eruption types. The main phenomenons during Hawaiian eruptions is steady lava fountaining and the production of thin lava flows that eventually build up into large, broad shield volcanoes. Eruptions are also common in central vents near the summit of shield volcanoes, and along linear volcanic vents radiating outward from the summit area. Lava advances downslope away from their source vents in lava channels and lava tubes. Eve Cone, one of the best preserved cinder cones in Canada. In Canada, cinder cones form when lava fountains release fragments of lava that harden in the air and fall around a linear volcanic vent. The rock fragments, often known as cinder or scoria, are glassy and contain gas bubbles "frozen" into place as magma exploded into the air and then cooled quickly. Some of the lava is not fragmented and flows from the vent as a lava flow. Cinder cones are also called pyroclastic cones and are found in volcanic fields, on the flanks of shield volcanoes, stratovolcanoes and calderas. For example, geologists have identified at least 30 young cinder cones on the Mount Edziza volcanic complex, a large shield volcano in northwestern British Columbia with an area of 1,000 square kilometres (390 sq mi). Eve Cone, on the northern end of the Mount Edziza volcanic complex, is one of the best preserved cinder cones in Canada, due to its undeformed and symmetrical shape. During other Hawaiian eruptions, fluid basaltic lava may pond in vents, craters, or broad depressions to produce lava lakes. As lava lakes solidify, they create a grey-silver crust that is usually only a few centimeters thick. Active lava lakes comprise young crust that is repeatedly destroyed and regenerated. Convective motion of the underlying lava causes the crust to break into slabs and sink. This then exposes new lava at the surface that cools into a new crustal layer which will again fracture into slabs and be recycled into the circulating lava beneath the crust.
Phreatic and phreatomagmatic eruptions	Phreatic eruption: 1: water vapor cloud, 2: magma conduit, 3: layers of lava and ash, 4: stratum, 5: water table, 6: explosion, 7: magma chamber	Main articles: Phreatic eruption and Phreatomagmatic eruption Phreatic eruptions occur when rising magma makes contact with ground or surface water. The extreme temperature of the magma causes near-instantaneous evaporation, resulting in an explosion of steam, water, ash, rocks and volcanic bombs. The temperature of the rock fragments can range from cold to incandescent. If magma is included, the term phreatomagmatic may be used. Phreatomagmatic eruptions occasionally create broad, low-relief volcanic craters called maars. These explosion craters are interpreted to have formed above rubble-filled volcanic pipes called diatremes; deep erosion of a maar presumably would expose a diatreme. Maars range in size from 61 to 1,981 metres (200–6,499 ft) across and from 9 to 198 metres (30–650 ft) deep and are commonly filled with water to form a crater lake. Fiftytwo Ridge at the southeastern end of Wells Gray Provincial Park in southeastern British Columbia is an example of a volcano containing lake-filled maars. Most maars have low rims composed of a mixture of loose fragments of volcanic rocks and rocks torn from the walls of the diatreme. Phreatic explosions can be accompanied by carbon dioxide or hydrogen sulfide gas emissions.
Subglacial eruptions	Subglacial eruption: 1: water vapor cloud, 2: lake, 3: ice, 4: layers of lava and ash, 5: strata, 6: pillow lava, 7: magma conduit, 8: magma chamber, 9: dike	Main article: Subglacial eruption Subglacial eruptions occur when lava erupts under large portions of glacial ice. As lava erupts under a large glacier, the heat of the lava would immediately start to melt the overlying glacial ice to produce meltwater. The resulting meltwater would quickly harden the lava to produce pillow-shaped masses called pillow lava. In places, the pillow lava will fracture to create other types of volcanic deposits called pillow breccia, tuff breccia, and hyaloclastite. If magma intruded and melted a vertical pipe through the overlying glacier, the partially molten mass would cool as a large block with gravity flattening its upper surface to form a flat-topped, steep-sided subglacial volcano called a tuya. The term tuya originates from Tuya Butte in far northern British Columbia. While still in graduate school in 1947, Canadian geologist William Henry Mathews coined the term "tuya" to refer to these distinctive volcanic formations and was one of the first people on Earth to describe in detail these types of subglacial volcanoes. Tuya Butte is the first such landform analyzed in the geological literature, and its name has since become standard worldwide among volcanologists in referring to and writing about tuyas. Other subglacial volcanoes, including subglacial mounds, are formed when the erupted magma is not hot enough to melt through the overlying glacial ice. Once the glaciers melt away, the tuyas and subglacial mounds would reappear with a distinctive shape as a result of their confinement within glacial ice. Because volcanic activity in Western and Northern Canada was contemporaneous with the ebb and flow of past glaciations, other volcanoes display ice-contact features. Mount Garibaldi in southwestern British Columbia is the only major volcano in North America known to have formed upon a regional ice sheet during the last glacial period, which began 110,000 years ago and ended between 10,000 and 15,000 years ago. Hoodoo Mountain in northern British Columbia was contained within basins thawed in the ice and assumed the flat-topped, steep-sided form of a tuya. Pyramid Mountain, in the Shuswap Highland of east-central British Columbia, was formed under more than 1,000 metres (3,300 ft) of glacial ice to assume the form of a subglacial mound. The Fort Selkirk Volcanic Field in central Yukon contains volcanic features that were erupted subglacially when the large Cordilleran Ice Sheet existed in this area between 0.8 and one million years ago.
Submarine eruptions	Submarine eruption: 1: water vapor cloud, 2: water, 3: stratum, 4: lava flow, 5: magma conduit, 6: magma chamber, 7: dike, 8: pillow lava	Main article: Submarine eruption Submarine eruptions are eruptions that occur underwater. The appearance of these eruptions is different from those that occur on land. When lava erupts it will be quickly cooled by the unlimited supply of water surrounding a submarine volcano, creating pillow lava. Explosive fragmentation of lavas forms hyaloclastites. Deep-sea submarine eruptions usually occur where the ocean floor is being pulled apart by plate tectonic movements called mid-ocean ridges, where about 75% of the Earth's magmatic eruptions occur. Shallow submarine eruptions can cause explosions of steam and volcanic ash called Surtseyan eruptions, named for the island of Surtsey off the southern coast of Iceland. Explosive submarine eruptions usually eject large quantities of very light volcanic rock called pumice. This very light volcanic rock can initially float on water, forming long-lived rafts of floating pumice carried long distances from the volcano by ocean currents. Lava flows entering water can cause explosions that form piles of ash and rubble similar to cinder cones, although they were formed from rootless vents not located above a magma conduit. The deformed volcanic sequences that form greenstone belts in the Canadian Shield contain hyaloclastite and pillow lavas, indicating these areas were once below sea level and the lava was rapidly cooled underwater. Pillow lavas more than two billion years old indicate large submarine volcanoes existed during the early stages of the Earth's formation.
Pelèan eruptions	Peléan eruption: 1: ash plume, 2: volcanic ash rain, 3: lava dome, 4: volcanic bomb, 5: pyroclastic flow, 6: layers of lava and ash, 7: strata, 8: magma conduit, 9: magma chamber, 10: dike	Main article: Peléan eruption Peléan eruptions are violent eruptions characterized by fast-moving streams of hot volcanic gas and rock called pyroclastic flows or nuées ardentes. Named for the stratovolcano Mount Pelée on the island of Martinique in the Caribbean Sea, Peléan eruptions occur when thick magma, typically of rhyolite, dacite and andesite type, is involved, and share some similarities with another type of explosive eruption known as Vulcanian eruptions. The thick magma associated with Peléan eruptions can form lava domes and lava spines in the volcano's vent or on the volcano's summit. Lava domes are steep-sided lava masses frequently circular in plan view and spiny, rounded, or flat on top. If a lava dome is created, it may later collapse, forming an ash column and sending flows of ash and hot volcanic blocks down the volcano's flanks. Lava spines are upright cylindrical masses of lava caused by the upward squeezing of pasty lava inside a volcanic vent.
Plinian eruptions	Plinian eruption: 1: ash plume, 2: magma conduit, 3: volcanic ash rain, 4: layers of lava and ash, 5: stratum, 6: magma chamber	Main article: Plinian eruption Plinian eruptions are large explosive eruptions that form pyroclastic flows and enormous dark columns of tephra and gas that commonly rise into the second layer of the Earth's atmosphere. Named for Roman natural philosopher Pliny the Younger, these spectacularly explosive eruptions are associated with magmas of high viscosity and gas content such as dacite and rhyolite and typically occur at calderas and stratovolcanoes. The duration of these eruptions is highly variable, ranging from hours to days, and they commonly occur at volcanic arcs where the Earth's tectonic plates are moving towards one another, with one sliding underneath the other called a subduction zone. Although Plinian eruptions typically involve magma with high levels of silica, such as dacite and rhyolite, they can occasionally occur at volcanoes characterized by passive basaltic eruptions, including shield volcanoes, when the magma chambers become differentiated and zoned to create a siliceous top. In some cases, a basaltic shield volcano may have periods of explosive activity to form a stratovolcano mounted on top of the shield volcano. An example of this activity includes the massive Level Mountain shield volcano in northwestern British Columbia, which is capped by a 860 km^{3} (206 mi^{3}) dissected stratovolcano. Plinth Peak of the Mount Meager massif in southwestern British Columbia is the source for a large-scale Plinian eruption that occurred 2,350 years ago, sending ash as far as Alberta Following massive Plinian eruptions, temperatures may decrease to cause volcanic winters. Volcanic winters are caused by volcanic ash and droplets of sulfuric acid obscuring the sun's light, usually after a volcanic eruption. A massive (VEI-7) Plinian eruption in 1815 from Mount Tambora on the island of Sumbawa, Indonesia expelled more than 150 km^{3} (36 cu mi) of volcanic ash around the Earth, causing particularly long, dark and harsh volcanic winters in Eastern Canada from 1816 to 1818. The result of this was the large amount of volcanic ash blocking out the sun's light, causing the Earth's temperature and visibility to decrease. The first volcanic winter in 1816, known as the Year Without a Summer, affected the Canadian province of Newfoundland and Labrador. In February 1816, a fire swept through St. John's, leaving 1,000 people homeless and in May during the following year, frost killed most of the crops that had been planted. In June, two large winter storms occurred throughout Eastern Canada, resulting in several casualties. The cause was limited amount of food supplies, and further deaths from those who, in a hunger-weakened state, then succumbed to disease. Nearly a foot of snow was observed in Quebec City. Rapid, dramatic temperature swings were common, with temperatures sometimes reverting from normal or above-normal summer temperatures as high as 35 °C to near-freezing within hours. In November 1817, two more fires swept through St. John's, leaving another 2,000 people poor. Many who had somewhere to live had low amounts of food or fuel for heating. The volcanic winters were also felt in the Maritime provinces, which includes Nova Scotia, New Brunswick and Prince Edward Island.

== Eastern Canada ==
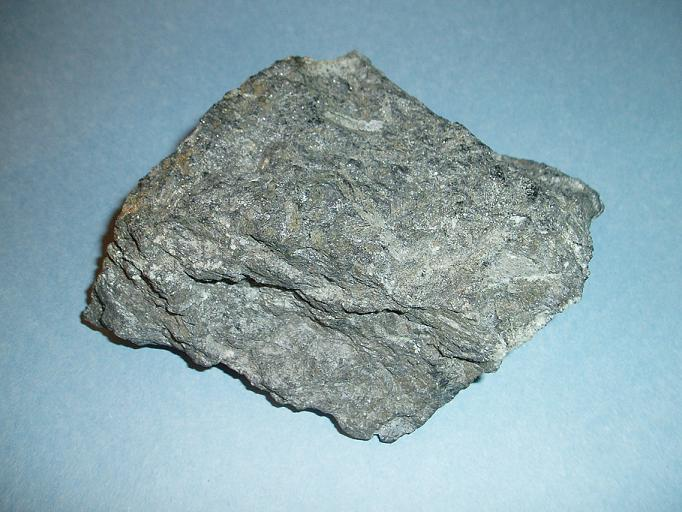
Komatiite sample collected in the Abitibi greenstone belt near Englehart, Ontario. Specimen is 9 cm (4 in) wide. Bladed olivine crystals are visible, though spinifex texture is weak or absent in this sample.

The 2,677‑million-year-old Abitibi greenstone belt in Ontario and Quebec is one of the largest Archean greenstone belts on Earth and one of the youngest parts of the Superior craton which sequentially forms part of the Canadian Shield. Komatiite lavas in the Abitibi greenstone belt (pictured) occur in four lithotectonic assemblages known as Pacaud, Stoughton-Roquemaure, Kidd-Munro and Tisdale. The Swayze greenstone belt further south is interpreted to be a southwestern extension of the Abitibi greenstone belt.

The Archean Red Lake greenstone belt in western Ontario consists of basaltic and komatiitic volcanics ranging in age from 2,925 to 2,940 million years old and younger rhyolite-andesite volcanics ranging in age from 2,730 to 2,750 million years old. It is situated in the western portion of the Uchi Subprovince, a volcanic sequence comprising a number of greenstone belts.

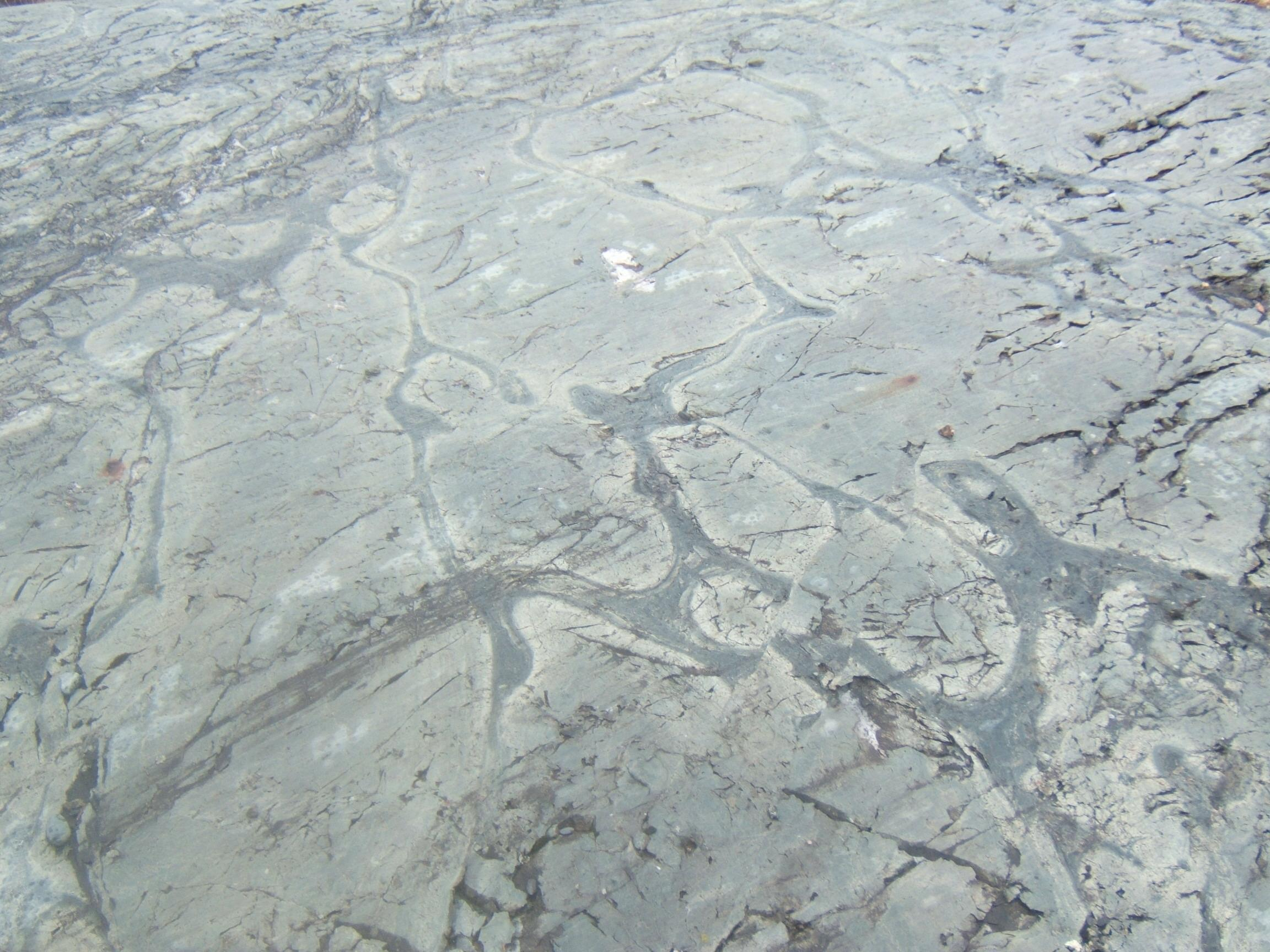
Weathered Precambrian pillow lava in the Temagami Greenstone Belt of the Canadian Shield

The 1884- to 1870‑million-year-old Circum-Superior Belt constitutes a large igneous province extending for more than 3,400 kilometres (2,100 mi) from the Labrador Trough in Labrador and northeastern Quebec though the Cape Smith Belt in northern Quebec, the Belcher Islands in southern Nunavut, the Fox River and Thompson belts in northern Manitoba, the Winnipegosis komatiite belt in central Manitoba, and on the southern side of the Superior craton in the Animikie Basin of northwestern Ontario. Two volcano-sedimentary sequences exist in the Labrador Trough with ages of 2,170–2,140 million years and 1,883–1,870 million years. In the Cape Smith Belt, two volcanic groups range in age from 2,040 to 1,870 million years old called the Povungnituk volcano-sedimentary Group and the Chukotat Group. The Belcher Islands in eastern Hudson Bay contain two volcanic sequences known as the Flaherty and Eskimo volcanics. The Fox River Belt consists of volcanics, sills and sediments some 1,883 million years old while magmatism of the Thompson Belt is dated to 1,880 million years old. To the south lies the 1,864‑million-year-old Winnipegosis komatiites. In the Animikie Basin near Lake Superior, volcanism is dated 1,880 million years old.

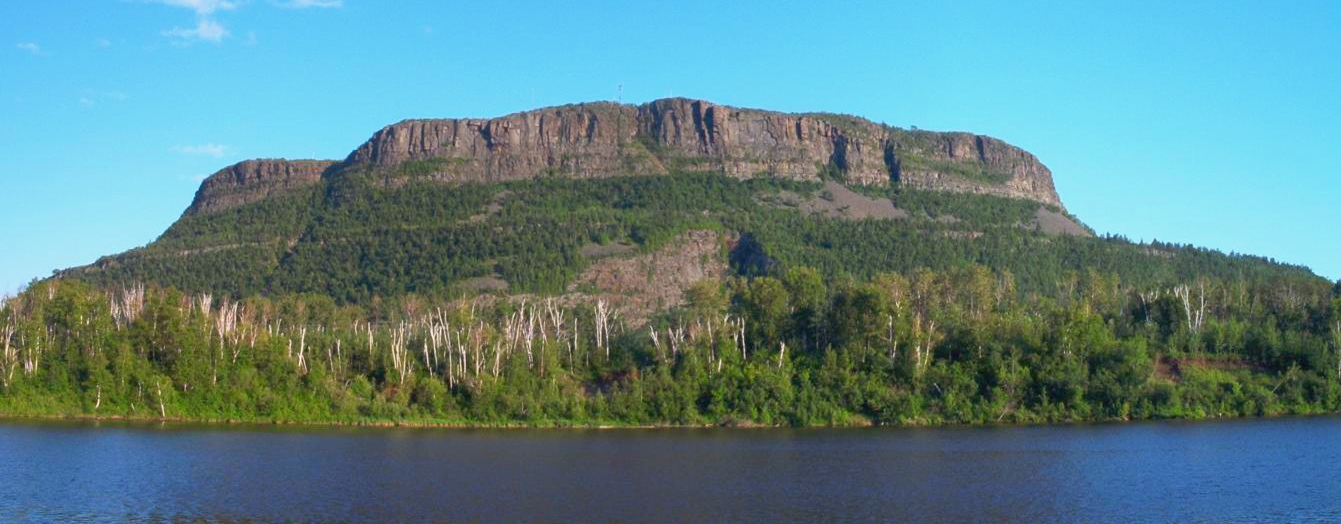
Mount McKay, a mafic sill related to volcanism of the Midcontinent Rift System in Thunder Bay, Ontario.

During the Mesoproterozoic era of the Precambrian eon 1,109 million years ago, northwestern Ontario began to split apart to form the Midcontinent Rift System, also called the Keweenawan Rift. Lava flows created by the rift in the Lake Superior area were formed from basaltic magma. The upwelling of this magma was the result of a hotspot which produced a triple junction in the vicinity of Lake Superior. The hotspot made a dome that covered the Lake Superior area. Voluminous basaltic lava flows erupted from the central axis of the rift, similar to the rifting that formed the Atlantic Ocean. A failed arm extends 150 kilometres (93 mi) north into mainland Ontario where it forms a geological formation known as the Nipigon Embayment. This failed arm includes Lake Nipigon, the largest lake entirely within the boundaries of Ontario.

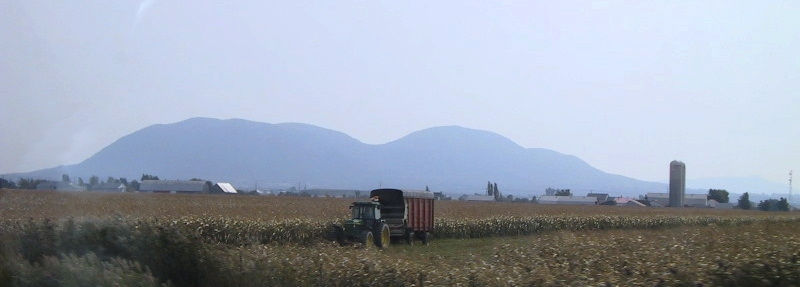
Mont Saint-Hilaire, an intrusive mountain of the Monteregian Hills in southern Quebec formed by the New England hotspot

Periods of volcanic activity occurred throughout central Canada during the Jurassic and Cretaceous periods. The source for this volcanism was a long-lived and stationary area of molten rock called the New England or Great Meteor hotspot. The first event erupted kimberlite magma in the James Bay lowlands region of northern Ontario 180 million years ago, creating the Attawapiskat kimberlite field. Another kimberlite event spanned a period of 13 million years 165 to 152 million years ago, creating the Kirkland Lake kimberlite field in northeastern Ontario. Another period of kimberlite volcanism occurred in northeastern Ontario 154 to 134 million years ago, creating the Lake Timiskaming kimberlite field. As the North American Plate moved westward over the New England hotspot, the New England hotspot created the magma intrusions of the Monteregian Hills in Montreal in southern Quebec. These intrusive stocks have been variously interpreted as the feeder intrusions of long extinct volcanoes that would have been active 125 million years ago, or as intrusions that never breached the surface in volcanic activity. The lack of a noticeable hotspot track west of the Monteregian Hills might be due either to failure of the New England mantle plume to pass through massive strong rock of the Canadian Shield, the lack of noticeable intrusions, or to strengthening of the New England mantle plume when it approached the Monteregian Hills region.

Basal contact of a lava flow section of the Fundy Basin

About 250 million years ago during the early Triassic period, Atlantic Canada lay roughly in the middle of a giant continent called Pangaea. This supercontinent began to fracture 220 million years ago when the Earth's lithosphere was being pulled apart from extensional stress, creating a divergent plate boundary known as the Fundy Basin. The focus of the rifting began somewhere between where present-day eastern North America and northwestern Africa were joined. During the formation of the Fundy Basin, volcanic activity never stopped as shown by the going eruption of lava along the Mid-Atlantic Ridge; an underwater volcanic mountain range in the Atlantic Ocean formed as a result of continuous seafloor spreading between eastern North America and northwestern Africa. As the Fundy Basin continued to form 201 million years ago, a series of basaltic lava flows were erupted, forming a volcanic mountain range on the mainland portion of southwestern Nova Scotia known as North Mountain, stretching 200 kilometres (120 mi) from Brier Island in the south to Cape Split in the north. This series of lava flows cover most of the Fundy Basin and extend under the Bay of Fundy where parts of it are exposed on the shore at the rural community of Five Islands, east of Parrsboro on the north side of the bay. Large dikes 4 to 30 metres (13–98 ft) wide exist throughout southernmost New Brunswick with ages and compositions similar to the North Mountain basalt, indicating these dikes were the source for North Mountain lava flows. However, North Mountain is the remnants of a larger volcanic feature that has now been largely eroded based on the existence of basin border faults and erosion. The hard basaltic ridge of North Mountain resisted the grinding of ice sheets that flowed over this region during the past ice ages, and now forms one side of the Annapolis Valley in the western part of the Nova Scotia peninsula. The layering of a North Mountain lava flow less than 175 metres (574 ft) thick at McKay Head, closely resemble that of some Hawaiian lava lakes, indicating Hawaiian eruptions occurred during the formation of North Mountain.

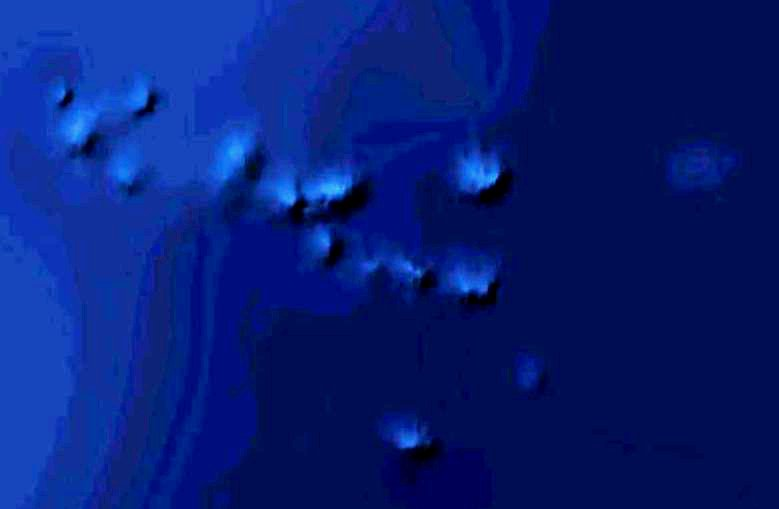
Satellite image of the Newfoundland Seamounts.

The Fogo Seamounts, located 500 km (311 mi) offshore of Newfoundland to the southwest of the Grand Banks, consists of submarine volcanoes with dates extending back to the Early Cretaceous period at least 143 million years ago. They may have one or two origins. The Fogo Seamounts could have formed along fracture zones in the Atlantic seafloor because of the large number of seamounts on the North American continental shelf. The other explanation for their origin is they formed above a mantle plume associated with the Canary or Azores hotspots in the Atlantic Ocean, based on the existence of older seamounts to the northwest and younger seamounts to the southeast. The existence of flat-topped seamounts throughout the Fogo Seamount chain indicate some of these seamounts would once have stood above sea level as islands that would have been volcanically active. Their flatness is due to coastal erosion, such as waves and winds. Other submarine volcanoes offshore of Eastern Canada include the poorly studied Newfoundland Seamounts.

== Western Canada ==
The Flin Flon greenstone belt in central Manitoba and east-central Saskatchewan is a collage of deformed volcanic arc rocks ranging in age from 1,904 to 1,864 million years old during the Paleoproterozoic sub-division of the Precambrian eon. Volcanic activity between 1,890 and 1,864 million years ago produced calc-alkaline andesite-rhyolite magmas and rare shoshonite and trachyandesite magmas while the 1,904‑million-year-old arc volcanism occurred in one or more separate volcanic arcs that were possibly characterized by rapid subduction of thin oceanic crust and large back-arc basins. In contrast, the younger 1,890‑million-year-old volcanics indicate evidence of crustal thickening. This was due to long-term growth of the volcanic arcs by continuous volcanic activity and tectonic thickening associated with arc collisions and successive arc deformation. This in turn followed a massive mountain building event called the Trans-Hudson orogeny.

The Cretaceous period 145-66 million years ago was a period for active kimberlite volcanism in the Western Canadian Sedimentary Basin of Alberta and Saskatchewan. The Fort à la Corne kimberlite field in central Saskatchewan formed 104 to 95 million years ago during the Early Cretaceous. Unlike most kimberlite fields on Earth, the Fort à la Corne kimberlite field formed during more than one eruptive event. Its kimberlites are among the most complete examples on Earth, preserving kimberlite pipes and maar volcanoes. The Northern Alberta kimberlite province consists of three kimberlite fields known as the Birch Mountains, Buffalo Head Hills and the Mountain Lake cluster. The Birch Mountains kimberlite field consists of eight kimberlite pipes known as Phoenix, Dragon, Xena, Legend and Valkyrie, dating approximately 75 million years old. The Buffalo Head Hills kimberlite field was dominated by explosive kimberlite volcanism from 88 million years ago to 81 million years ago, forming maars. Kimberlites of the Buffalo Head Hills field are similar to those associated with the Fort à la Corne kimberlite field in central Saskatchewan. The kimberlite pipes of the Mountain Lake cluster were formed during a similar timespan with the Birch Mountains field 77 million years ago.

=== Formation of the Pacific Northwest ===
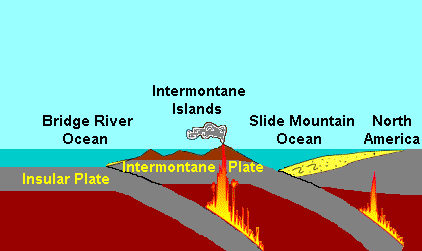
Plate tectonics of the Intermontane Islands arc 195 million years ago.

The Canadian portion of the Pacific Northwest began forming during the early Jurassic period when a group of active volcanic islands collided against a pre-existing continental margin and coastline of Western Canada. These volcanic islands, known as the Intermontane Islands by geoscientists, were formed on a pre-existing tectonic plate called the Intermontane Plate about 245 million years ago by subduction of the former Insular Plate to its west during the Triassic period. This subduction zone records another subduction zone called the Intermontane Trench under an ancient ocean between the Intermontane Islands and the former continental margin of Western Canada called the Slide Mountain Ocean. This arrangement of two parallel subduction zones is unusual in that very few twin subduction zones exist on Earth; the Philippine Mobile Belt off the eastern coast of Asia is an example of a modern twin subduction zone. As the Intermontane Plate drew closer to the pre-existing continental margin by ongoing subduction under the Slide Mountain Ocean, the Intermontane Islands drew closer to the former continental margin and coastline of Western Canada, supporting a volcanic arc on the former continental margin of Western Canada. As the North American Plate drifted west and the Intermontane Plate continued to drift east to the ancient continental margin of Western Canada, the Slide Mountain Ocean began to close by ongoing subduction under the Slide Mountain Ocean. This subduction zone eventually jammed and shut down completely about 180 million years ago, ending the arc volcanism on the ancient continental margin of Western Canada and the Intermontane Islands collided, forming a long chain of deformed volcanic and sedimentary rock called the Intermontane Belt, which consists of deeply cut valleys, high plateaus, and rolling uplands. This collision also crushed and folded sedimentary and igneous rocks, creating a mountain range called the Kootenay Fold Belt which existed in far eastern British Columbia.

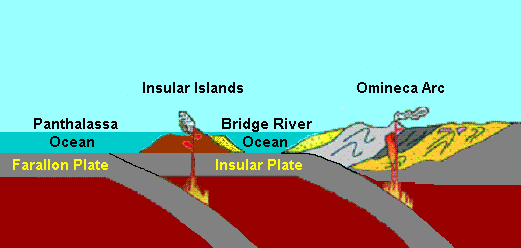
Plate tectonics of the Omineca and Insular arcs 130 million years ago.

After the sedimentary and igneous rocks were folded and crushed, it resulted in the creation of a new continental shelf and coastline. The Insular Plate continued to subduct under the new continental shelf and coastline about 130 million years ago during the mid Cretaceous period after the formation of the Intermontane Belt, supporting a new continental volcanic arc called the Omineca Arc. Magma rising from the Omineca Arc successfully connected the Intermontane Belt to the mainland of Western Canada, forming a chain of volcanoes in British Columbia that existed discontinuously for about 60 million years. The ocean lying offshore during this period is called the Bridge River Ocean. It was also during this period when another group of active volcanic islands existed along the newly built continental shelf and coastline. These volcanic islands, known as the Insular Islands, were formed on the Insular Plate by subduction of the former Farallon Plate to its west during the early Paleozoic era. As the North American Plate drifted west and the Insular Plate drifted east to the continental margin of Western Canada, the Bridge River Ocean began to close by ongoing subduction under the Bridge River Ocean. This subduction zone eventually jammed and shut down completely 115 million years ago, ending the Omineca Arc volcanism and the Insular Islands collided, forming the Insular Belt. Compression resulting from this collision crushed, fractured and folded rocks along the continental margin. The Insular Belt then welded onto the continental margin by magma that eventually cooled to create a large mass of igneous rock, creating a new continental margin. This large mass of igneous rock is the largest granite outcropping in North America.

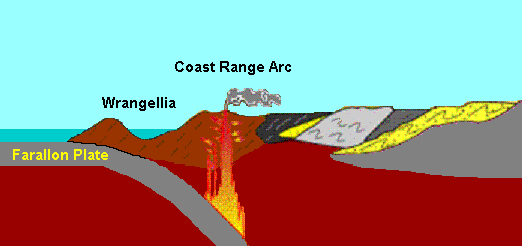
Plate tectonics of the Coast Range Arc 100 million years ago.

The Farallon Plate continued to subduct under the new continental margin of Western Canada after the Insular Plate and Insular Islands collided with the former continental margin, supporting a new chain of volcanoes on the mainland of Western Canada called the Coast Range Arc about 100 million years ago during the Late Cretaceous epoch. Magma ascending from the Farallon Plate under the new continental margin burned their way upward through the newly accreted Insular Belt, injecting huge quantities of granite into older igneous rocks of the Insular Belt. At the surface, new volcanoes were built along the continental margin. The basement of this arc was likely Early Cretaceous and Late Jurassic age intrusions from the Insular Islands.

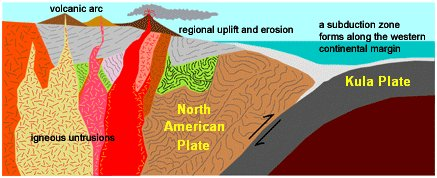
Plate tectonics of the Coast Range Arc about 75 million years ago

One of the major aspects that changed early during the Coast Range Arc was the status of the northern end of the Farallon Plate, a portion now known as the Kula Plate. About 85 million years ago, the Kula Plate broke off from the Farallon Plate to form an area of seafloor spreading called the Kula-Farallon Ridge. This change apparently had some important ramifications for regional geologic evolution. When this change was completed, Coast Range Arc volcanism returned and sections of the arc were uplifted considerably in latest Cretaceous time. This started a period of mountain building that affected much of western North America called the Laramide orogeny. In particular a large area of dextral transpression and southwest-directed thrust faulting was active from 75 to 66 million years ago. Much of the record of this deformation has been overridden by Tertiary age structures and the zone of Cretaceous dextral thrust faulting appears to have been widespread. It was also during this period when massive amounts of molten granite intruded highly deformed ocean rocks and assorted fragments from pre-existing island arcs, largely remnants of the Bridge River Ocean. This molten granite burned the old oceanic sediments into a glittering medium-grade metamorphic rock called schist. The older intrusions of the Coast Range Arc were then deformed under the heat and pressure of later intrusions, turning them into layered metamorphic rock known as gneiss. In some places, mixtures of older intrusive rocks and the original oceanic rocks have been distorted and warped under intense heat, weight and stress to create unusual swirled patterns known as migmatite, appearing to have been nearly melted in the procedure.

Volcanism began to decline along the length of the arc about 60 million years ago during the Albian and Aptian faunal stages of the Cretaceous period. This resulted from the changing geometry of the Kula Plate, which progressively developed a more northerly movement along the mainland of Western Canada. Instead of subducting beneath Western Canada, the Kula Plate began subducting underneath southwestern Yukon and Alaska during the early Eocene period. Volcanism along the entire length of the Coast Range Arc shut down about 50 million years ago and many of the volcanoes have disappeared from erosion. What remains of the Coast Range Arc to this day are outcrops of granite when magma intruded and cooled at depth beneath the volcanoes, forming the Coast Mountains. During construction of intrusions 70 and 57 million years ago, the northern motion of the Kula Plate might have been between 140 mm (6 in) and 110 mm (4 in) per year. However, other geologic studies determined the Kula Plate moved at a rate as fast as 200 mm (8 in) per year.

=== Cascadia subduction zone complexes ===
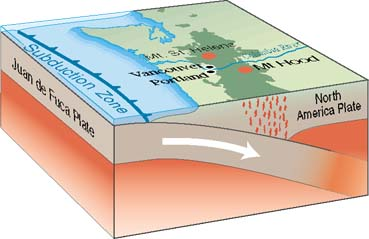
Structure of the Cascadia subduction zone

As the last of the Kula Plate decayed and the Farallon Plate advanced back into this area from the south, it once again started to subduct under the continental margin of Western Canada 37 million years ago, supporting a chain of volcanoes called the Cascade Volcanic Arc. At least four volcanic formations along the British Columbia Coast are associated with Cascadia subduction zone volcanism. The oldest is the eroded 18-million-year-old Pemberton Volcanic Belt which extends west-northwest from south-central British Columbia to Haida Gwaii in the northeast where it lies 150 kilometres (93 mi) west of mainland British Columbia. In the south it is defined by a group of epizonal intrusions and a few erosional remnants of eruptive rock. Farther north in the large Ha-Iltzuk and Waddington icefields, it includes two large dissected calderas called Silverthrone Caldera and Franklin Glacier Complex while Haida Gwaii to the northeast contains a volcanic formation ranging in age from Miocene to Pliocene called the Masset Formation. Although widely separated from each other, all Pemberton Belt rocks are of similar age and have similar magma compositions. Therefore, these magmatic rocks are believed to be products of arc volcanism related to subduction of the Farallon Plate. By late Pliocene time the Farallon Plate had been greatly reduced in size and its northern portion ultimately broke off between five and seven million years ago to form a new plate boundary called the Nootka Fault. This rupture created the two small Juan de Fuca and Explorer plates that lie off the west coast of Vancouver Island.

Map of the Garibaldi Volcanic Belt

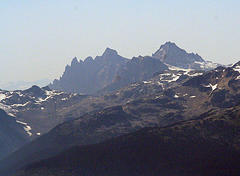
The Mount Cayley massif on August 13, 2005. Summits left to right are Pyroclastic Peak and Mount Cayley.

The four-million-year-old Garibaldi Volcanic Belt, a north-south trending zone of volcanoes and volcanic rock in the southern Coast Mountains of southwestern British Columbia, can be grouped into at least three enechelon segments, referred to as the northern, central, and southern segments. The northern segment overlaps the older Pemberton Volcanic Belt at a low angle near the Mount Meager massif where Garibaldi Belt lavas rest on uplifted and deeply eroded remnants of Pemberton Belt subvolcanic intrusions and combines to form a single belt. A few isolated volcanoes northwest of the Mount Meager massif, such as Silverthrone Caldera and Franklin Glacier Complex, are also grouped as part of the Garibaldi Volcanic Belt. However, their tectonic origins are largely unexplained and are a matter of going research. When the Farallon Plate ruptured to create the Nootka Fault between five and seven million years ago, there were some apparent changes along the Cascadia subduction zone. At issue is the current plate configuration and rate of subduction but based on rock composition is for Silverthrone Caldera and Franklin Glacier Complex to be subduction related. The roughly circular, 20 kilometres (12 mi) wide, deeply dissected Silverthrone Caldera in the northern segment of the Garibaldi Volcanic Belt, was formed one million years ago during the Early Pleistocene period. The bulk of the volcano was erupted 0.4 million years ago, but younger phases, consisting of lava flows and subsidiary volcanoes with compositions of andesite and basaltic andesite are also present. Silverthrone Mountain, an eroded lava dome on the northeast edge of Silverthrone Caldera, was episodically active during both Pemberton and Garibaldi stages of volcanism. The eroded Franklin Glacier Complex just to the southeast consists of dacite and andesite rocks that range in age from 3.9 to 2.2 million years old. Southeast of Franklin Glacier Complex, the Bridge River Cones comprise remnants of both andesitic and alkali basalt cones and lava flows. These range in age from about one million years old to 0.5 million years old and commonly display ice-contact features related to subglacial eruptions. The Mount Meager massif, the most persistent volcano in the northern portion of the Garibaldi Volcanic Belt, is a complex of at least four overlapping stratovolcanoes made of dacite and rhyodacite that become progressively younger from south to north, ranging in age from two million to 2,490 years old. The central segment of the Garibaldi Volcanic Belt is defined by a group of eight volcanoes on a ridge of highland east of the Squamish River, and by remnants of basaltic lava flows preserved in the adjacent Squamish valley. Mount Cayley, the largest and most persistent volcano, is a deeply eroded stratovolcano comprising a lava dome complex made of dacite and minor rhyodacite ranging in age from 3.8 to 0.31 million years old. Mount Fee, a narrow volcanic plug made of rhyodacite about 1 kilometre (3,300 ft) long and 250 metres (820 ft) wide, rises 150 metres (490 ft) above the highland ridge. Complete denudation of the central spine as well as the absence of till under lava flows from Mount Fee suggest a preglacial age. The other volcanoes of the central Garibaldi Belt, including Ember Ridge, Pali Dome, Cauldron Dome, Slag Hill, Mount Brew and Crucible Dome, were formed during subglacial eruptions to develop tuya-like forms with over-steepened, ice-contact margins. The primary volcanoes in the southern segment are Mount Garibaldi, Mount Price, and The Black Tusk. The oldest volcano, The Black Tusk, is the remnants of an extinct andesitic stratovolcano that formed during two distant stages of volcanic activity, the first between 1.1 and 1.3 million years ago and the second between 0.17 and 0.21 million years ago. Mount Garibaldi, a fairly dissected stratovolcano 80 kilometres (50 mi) north of Vancouver, was built by Peléan eruptions between 0.26 and 0.22 million years ago during the waning stages of the last glacial, or "Wisconsinian", period. Mount Price, a less significant stratovolcano just north of Mount Garibaldi, formed during three distinct periods of volcanic activity beginning at 1.2 million years ago and culminating with the eruption of Clinker Peak on its western flank 0.3 million years ago. In addition to the large, central andesite-dacite volcanoes, the southern portion of the Garibaldi Volcanic Belt includes remnants of basalt and basaltic andesite lava flows and pyroclastic rocks. These include valley -filling lava flows interbedded with till containing wood about 34,000 years old.

The poorly studied Alert Bay Volcanic Belt extends from Brooks Peninsula on the northwestern coast of Vancouver Island to Port McNeill on the northeastern coast of Vancouver Island. It encompasses several separate remnants of late Neogene volcanic piles and related intrusions ranging in composition from basalt to rhyolite and in age from about eight million years old in the west to about 3.5 million years old elsewhere. Major element analyses of Alert Bay volcanic and hypabyssal rocks suggest two different basalt-andesite-dacite-rhyolite suites with divergent fractionation trends. The first coincides with the typical calc-alkaline, Cascade trend, whereas the other is more alkaline and more Fe-enriched following a trend which straddles the calc-alkaline-tholeiite boundary. The western end of the Alert Bay Volcanic Belt is now about 80 kilometres (50 mi) northeast of the Nootka Fault. However, at the time of its formation the volcanic belt may have been coincident with the subducted plate boundary. Also, the timing of volcanism corresponds to shifts of plate motion and changes in the locus of volcanism along the Pemberton and Garibaldi volcanic belts. This brief interval of plate motion adjustment at about 3.5 million years ago may have triggered the generation of basaltic magma along the descending plate edge. Because the Alert Bay Volcanic Belt has not been active for at least 3.5 million years, volcanism in the Alert Bay Volcanic Belt is probably extinct.

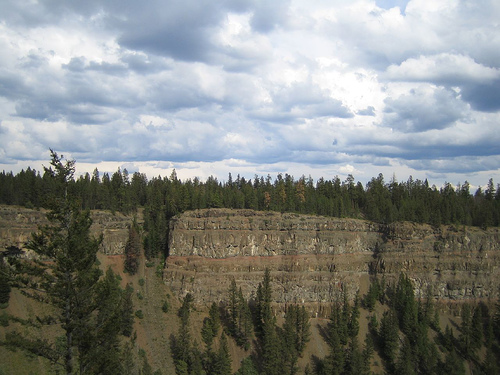
Cliffs made of lava flows from former extensive volcanic activity in the Chilcotin Group.

The Chilcotin Group, a 50,000 km^{2} (19,000 sq mi) large igneous province and volcanic plateau in south-central British Columbia, consists of thin, flat-lying, poorly formed columnar basalt lava flows that have formed as a result of partial melting in a weak zone in the upper part of the Earth's mantle within a back-arc basin related to subduction of the Juan de Fuca Plate. Chilcotin Group volcanism occurred in three distant magmatic episodes, the first 16-14 million years ago, the seconed 10-6 million years ago and the third 3-1 million years ago. Anahim Peak, a volcanic plug near the eastern flank of the Rainbow Range, and other plugs penetrating the Chilcotin Group are suggested to be vents for basalt volcanism. These volcanic plugs form a northwest trend about 150 kilometres (93 mi) inland from the Pemberton and Garibaldi volcanic belts and exist along the axis of the volcanic plateau. Silicic tuff lying between Chilcotin basalt lava flows, likely originated from explosive eruptions related to arc volcanism in the Garibaldi and Pemberton belts just to the west and was preserved between successive basaltic lava eruptions in the Chilcotin back-arc basin. It is suggested by geoscientists the Chilcotin Group forms a sequence of merged low-profile shield volcanoes erupted from central vents.

=== British Columbia plume and rift complexes ===
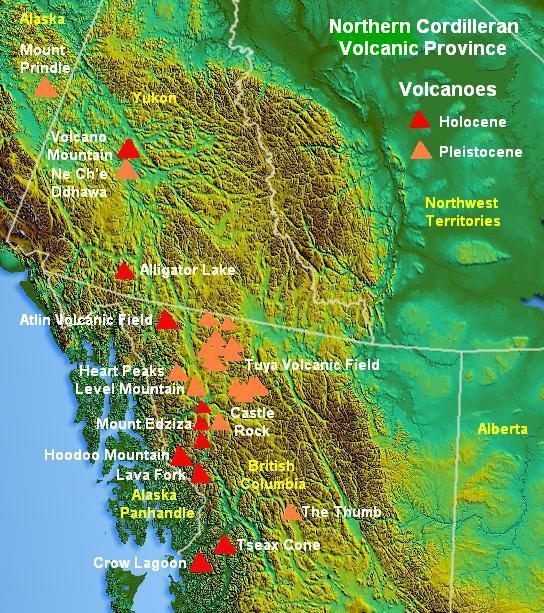
Map of the Northern Cordilleran Volcanic Province.

The Northern Cordilleran Volcanic Province of northwestern British Columbia, also called the Stikine Volcanic Belt, is the most active volcanic region in Canada. It comprises a large number of small cinder cones and associated lava plains, and three large, compositionally diverse volcanoes, known as the Level Mountain, the Mount Edziza volcanic complex, and Hoodoo Mountain. In the south the volcanic province is somewhat narrow and crosses diagonally through the northwesterly structural trend of the Coast Mountains. Farther north it is less clearly defined, forming a large arch that swings westward through central Yukon. Volcanoes within the British Columbia portion of the Northern Cordilleran Volcanic Province are disposed along short, northerly trending en-echelon segments which, in the British Columbia portion of the volcanic province, are unmistakably involved with north-trending rift structures including synvolcanic grabens and half-grabens similar to the East African Rift, which extends from the Afar triple junction southward across eastern Africa. The Northern Cordilleran rift system formed as a result of the North American continent being stretched by extensional forces as the Pacific Plate slides northward along the Queen Charlotte Fault to the west, on its way to the Aleutian Trench, which extends along the southern coastline of Alaska and the adjacent waters of northeastern Siberia off the coast of Kamchatka Peninsula. As the continental crust stretches, the near-surface rocks fracture along steeply dipping cracks parallel to the rift known as faults. Hot basaltic magma rises along these fractures to create passive lava eruptions. The compositions of lavas in the Northern Cordilleran Volcanic Province are mantle-derived alkali olivine basalt, lesser hawaiite and basanite, which form the large shield volcanoes and small cinder cones throughout the volcanic province. Many of them contain inclusions of lherzolite. The large central volcanoes of the volcanic province consist largely of trachyte, pantellerite, and comendite lavas. These lava compositions were formed by fractionation of primary alkali basalt magma in crustal reservoirs. A region of continental rifting, such as the Northern Cordilleran Volcanic Province, would support the development of high-level reservoirs of sufficient size and thermal capacity to sustain prolonged fractionation.

Map of the Anahim Volcanic Belt

The Anahim Volcanic Belt extends from coastal British Columbia across the Coast Mountains into the Interior Plateau. Its western end is defined by alkaline intrusive and comagmatic volcanic rocks of the Bella Bella-King Island complex, exposed in fjords and islands of the western Coast Mountains. The central portion of the Anahim Volcanic Belt contains three complex shield volcanoes, known as the Rainbow, Ilgachuz, and Itcha ranges. These fairly dissected shield volcanoes lie on the northern end of the Chilcotin Group lava plateau and distal lava flows at the margins of the shield volcanoes merge imperceptibly with flat-lying lava flows comprising the Chilcotin Group lava plateau. Unlike the Chilcotin Group basalt, which is not associated with any felsic derivatives, the volcanoes of the central Anahim Volcanic Belt are markedly bimodal, comprising a mixed assemblage of basalt and peralkaline silicic rocks. While volcanoes of the Anahim Volcanic Belt appear to merge laterally with the Chilcotin Group lavas, the particular nature and connection between the Anahim Volcanic Belt and the Chilcotin Group is unknown. However, volcanoes within the Anahim Volcanic Belt usually become younger from coastal British Columbia to near the small city of Quesnel further east, indicating these volcanoes may have formed as a result of the North American Plate passing over a possible mantle plume known as the Anahim hotspot, whereas the Chilcotin Group is related to back-arc basin volcanism. Nazko Cone, a cluster of basaltic cinder cones in the Nazko area 75 kilometres (47 mi) west of Quesnel forms the youngest and most easterly part of the Anahim Volcanic Belt with dates of 7,200 years.

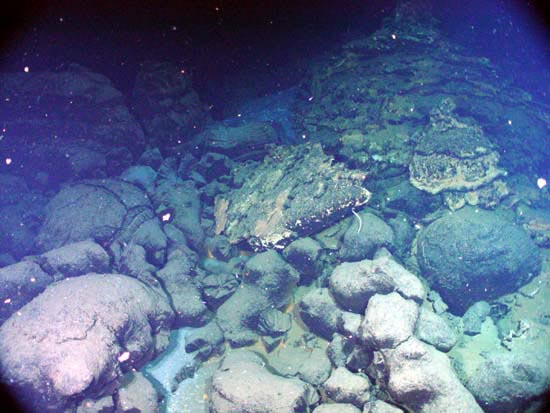
Pillow lavas and breccia overlain with slabby pieces of sulfide formed from hydrothermal venting on the east side of the Southern Explorer Ridge.

The Explorer Ridge, an underwater mountain range lying 160 kilometres (99 mi) west of Vancouver Island on the Coast of British Columbia, consists of a north-south trending rift zone. It contains one major segment known as the Southern Explorer Ridge, along with other smaller segments, such as the Northern Explorer Ridge. With a depth of 1,800 metres (5,900 ft), the Southern Explorer Ridge is relatively shallow in comparison with most other rift zones of the northeast Pacific Ocean, indicating there has been considerable volcanic activity along this part of the Explorer Ridge in the past 100,000 years. Magic Mountain, a large hydrothermal vent area on the Southern Explorer Ridge, is a scene of this volcanic activity. Unlike most hydrothermal systems found in the Pacific Ocean, the Magic Mountain site is situated outside the primary rift zone. The source for the hydrothermal fluid that fuels Magic Mountain probably rises along fracture systems associated with a recent episode of rifting that, in turn, followed a massive outpouring of lava. In contrast, the Northern Explorer Ridge has evolved into a complex compound structure consisting of several rift basins bounded by half-graben and arcuate shaped faults with a superimposed pattern of rhombohedral grabens and horsts.

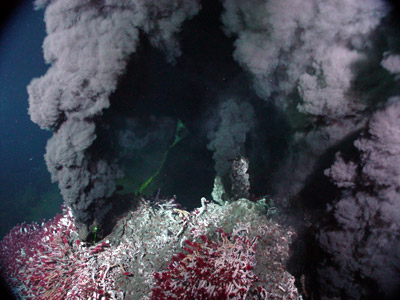
This vigorously venting black smoker of the Main Endeavor hydrothermal field, called Sully, emits jets of particle-laden fluids that create the black smoke.

The Endeavor Segment, an active rift zone of the larger Juan de Fuca Ridge on the British Columbia Coast, contains a group of active black smokers called the Endeavor Hydrothermal Vents, located 250 kilometres (160 mi) southwest of Vancouver Island. This group of hydrothermal vents lies 2,250 metres (7,380 ft) below sea level and consists of five hydrothermal fields, known as Sasquatch, Saily Dawg, High Rise, Mothra, and Main Endeavor. Like typical hydrothermal vents, the Endeavor Hydrothermal Vents form when cold seawater seeps into cracks and crevices in the Endeavor Segment where it becomes heated by magma that lies beneath the seafloor. As the water is heated, it rises and seeks a path back out into the Pacific Ocean through openings in the Endeavor Segment, forming hydrothermal vents. These hydrothermal vents release fluids with temperatures of over 300 °C and have been a focus of research by Canadian and international scientists. The crewed United States Navy deep-ocean research submersible DSV Alvin and the remotely operated underwater vehicle Jason have done work at the Endeavor Hydrothermal Vents. Joint Canada-United States studies have made use of the Canadian Remotely Operated Platform for Ocean Sciences. Fisheries and Oceans Canada has conducted extensive acoustic and mooredinstrument programs at the Endeavor Hydrothermal Vents since 1985.

== Northern Canada ==
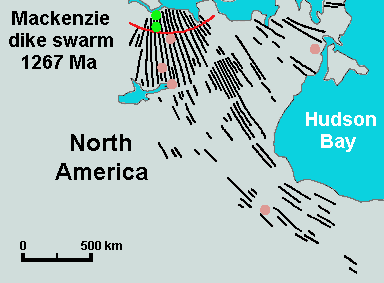
Map of the 1,267-million-year-old Mackenzie dike swarm (black lines). Dots indicate areas where flow direction was determined. Red arcuate line indicates boundary between vertical flow and horizontal flow.

Vast volumes of basaltic lava covered Northern Canada in the form of a flood basalt event 1,267 million years ago that engulfed the landscape near the Coppermine River southwest of Coronation Gulf in the Canadian Arctic. This volcanic activity built an extensive lava plateau and large igneous province with an area of 170,000 km^{2} (65,637 sq mi) representing a volume of lavas of at least 500,000 km^{3} (119,956 cu mi). With an area of 170,000 km^{2} (65,637 sq mi) and a volume of at least 500,000 km^{3} (119,956 cu mi), it is larger than the Columbia River Basalt Group in the United States and comparable in size to the Deccan Traps in west-central India, making it one of the largest flood basalt events ever to appear on the North American continent, as well as on Earth. This massive eruptive event was associated with the Mackenzie magmatic event, that included the coeval, layered, mafic-ultramafic Muskox intrusion and the enormous Mackenzie dike swarm that diverges from the Coppermine River flood basalts. The maximum thickness of the flood basalts are 4.7 km (3 mi) and consist of 150 lava flows, each 4 to 100 m (13 to 328 ft) thick. These flood basalt lava flows were erupted during a single event that lasted less than five million years. Analysis of the chemical composition of the lavas gives important clues about the origin and dynamics of the flood basalt volcanism. The lowermost lavas were produced by melting in the garnet stability field below the surface at a depth of more than 90 kilometres (56 mi) in a mantle plume environment beneath the North American lithosphere. As the mantle plume intruded rocks of the Canadian Shield, it created an upwelling zone of molten rock known as the Mackenzie hotspot. Upper lavas were partly contaminated with crustal rocks as magmas from the mantle plume passed through the lower and upper crust.

During the Early Jurassic period 196 million years ago, the New England or Great Meteor hotspot existed in the Rankin Inlet area of southern Nunavut along the northwestern coast of Hudson Bay, producing kimberlite magmas. This marks the first appearance of the New England hotspot, as well as the oldest kimberlite eruption throughout the New England or Great Meteor hotspot track, which extends southeastwards across Canada and enters the northern Atlantic Ocean where the New England hotspot is located.

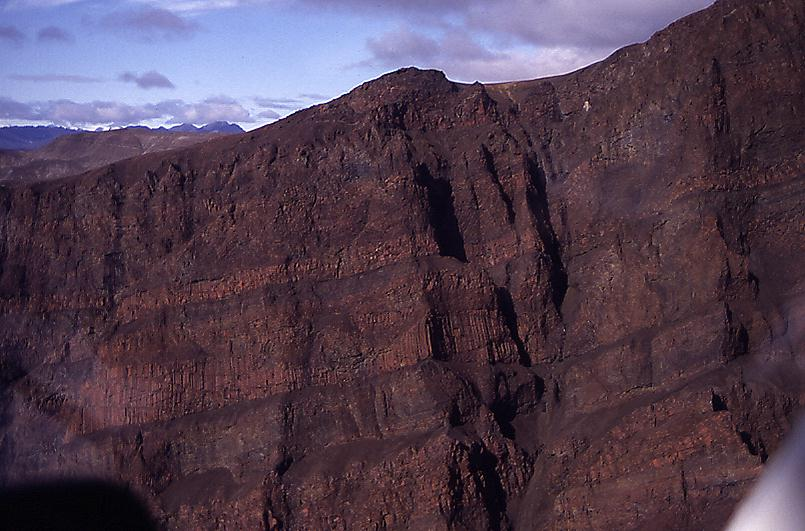
Dragon Cliff on western Axel Heiberg Island is made of flood basalt lava flows of the Strand Fiord Formation

The Sverdrup Basin Magmatic Province of northern Nunavut forms a large igneous province 95 to 92 million years old in the Canadian Arctic. Part of the larger High Arctic Large Igneous Province, it consists of two volcanic formations called the Ellesmere Island Volcanics and Strand Fiord Formation. In the Strand Fiord Formation, flood basalt lavas reach a thickness of at least 1 kilometre (3,300 ft). Flood basalts of the Sverdrup Basin Magmatic Province are similar to terrestrial flood basalts associated with breakup of continents, indicating the Sverdrup Basin Magmatic Province formed as a result of rifting of the Arctic Ocean and when the large underwater Alpha Ridge was still geologically active.

Widespread basalt volcanism occurred between 60.9 and 61.3 million years ago in the northern Labrador Sea, Davis Strait and in southern Baffin Bay on the eastern coast of Nunavut during the Paleocene period when North America and Greenland were being separated from tectonic movements. This resulted from seafloor spreading where new ocean seafloor was being created from rising magma. Scientific studies have indicated nearly 80% of the magma was erupted in one million years or less. The source for this volcanic activity was the Iceland plume along with its surface expression, the Iceland hotspot. This volcanic activity formed part of a large igneous province that is sunken beneath the northern Labrador Sea. Another period of volcanic activity began in the same region about 55 million years ago during the Eocene period when the north-south trending Mid-Atlantic Ridge began to form under the northern Atlantic Ocean east of Greenland. The cause of this volcanism might be related to partial melting from movement of a transform fault system extending from Labrador Sea to the south and Baffin Bay to the north. Although the region was carried away from the Iceland plume by going plate motion over millions of years, the source of the partial melting for the final period of volcanic activity may have been remnants of still anomalously hot Iceland plume magma which were left stranded beneath the North American lithosphere in the Paleocene period. Most diatremes in the Northwest Territories were formed by volcanic eruptions between 45 and 75 million years ago during the Eocene and Late Cretaceous periods.

More recent volcanic activity has created a northwest trending line of volcanic rocks called the Wrangell Volcanic Belt. This volcanic belt lies largely in the U.S. state of Alaska, but extends across the Alaska-Yukon border into southwestern Yukon where it contains scattered remnants of subaerial lavas and pyroclastic rocks which are preserved along the entire eastern fringe of the ice covered Saint Elias Mountains. The Wrangell Volcanic Belt formed as a result of arc volcanism related to subduction of the Pacific Plate under the northern portion of the North American Plate. Over large areas extrusive rocks lie in flat undisturbed piles on a Tertiary surface of moderate relief. Locally, however, strata of the same age have been affected by a late pulse of tectonism, during which they were faulted, contorted into tight symmetrical folds, or overridden by pre-Tertiary basement rocks along southwesterly dipping thrust faults. Considerable recent uplift, accompanied by rapid erosion, has reduced once vast areas of upper Tertiary volcanic rocks to small isolated remnants. Although no eruptions have occurred in the Yukon portion of the Wrangell Belt for the past five million years, two large (VEI-6) explosive eruptions from Mount Churchill 24 kilometres (15 mi) west of the Alaska-Yukon border, created the White River Ash deposit. This volcanic ash deposit is estimated 1,890 and 1,250 years old, covering more than 340,000 km^{2} (130,000 sq mi) of northwestern Canada and adjacent eastern Alaska. Native American legends about the area indicate the final eruption from Mount Churchill 1,250 years ago disrupted food supplies and forced them to move further south.

The Yukon portion of the northwest trending Northern Cordilleran Volcanic Province includes the youngest volcanoes in Northern Canada. The Fort Selkirk Volcanic Field in central Yukon consists of valley-filling basalt lava flows and cinder cones. Ne Ch'e Ddhawa, a cinder cone 2 kilometres (1.2 mi) away from the connection of the Yukon and Pelly rivers formed between 0.8 and one million years ago when this area lied beneath the vast Cordilleran Ice Sheet. The youngest volcano, Volcano Mountain just north of the junction of the Yukon and Pelly rivers, formed in past 10,000 years (Holocene), producing lava flows that remain unvegetated and appear to be only a few hundred years old. However, dating of sediments in a lake impounded by the lava flows indicated that the youngest lava flows could not be younger than mid-Holocene and could be early Holocene or older. Therefore, the most recent activity in the Fort Selkirk volcanic field is unknown. The lava flows from Volcano Mountain are unusual because they originate much deeper in the Earth's mantle than the more common basaltic lava flows found throughout the Yukon and are very uncommon in the geological record. This lava, known as olivine nephelinite, is also unusual because it contains small, angular to rounded fragments of rock called nodules.

== Economic geology ==
=== Greenstone belts ===
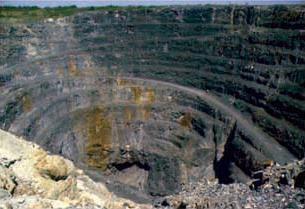
Volcanogentic massive sulfide ore deposit at Kidd Mine, Timmins, Ontario, Canada, formed 2.4 billion years ago on an ancient seafloor.

The predominantly volcanic Archean and Proterozoic greenstone belts throughout Canada are important for estimating Canada's mineral potential. Consequently, geologists study greenstone belts to understand the volcanoes and the environment in which they erupted, and to provide a working model for mineral exploration. The 1,904‑ to 1,864‑million-year-old Flin Flon greenstone belt of central Manitoba and east-central Saskatchewan is one of the largest Paleoproterozoic age volcanogenic massive sulfide ore deposits in the world, containing 27 copper-zinc-(gold) deposits from which more than 183 million tonnes of sulfide ore have been mined. The 2,575‑million-year-old Yellowknife greenstone belt in the Northwest Territories is the host for world-class gold deposits with total production of 15 million ounces of gold. In the Archean Hope Bay greenstone belt of western Nunavut, three large gold deposits have been known as Doris, Boston and Madrid, while the 2,677‑million-year-old Abitibi greenstone belt of Ontario and Quebec is the second most prolific gold producing area on Earth; the most prolific gold producing area is the Witwatersrand hill range in South Africa.

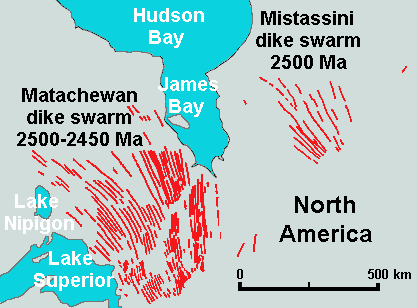
Map of the 2,500- to 2,450-million-year-old Matachewan dike swarm and the 2,500-million-year-old Mistassini dike swarm of eastern Canada

=== Intrusions ===
Other magmatic formations, such as dike swarms and sills, are known to contain base and precious metal deposits. The 2,500- to 2,450-million-year-old Matachewan dike swarm of eastern Ontario hosts the 2,491- to 2,475-million-year-old 20 kilometres (12 mi) long East Bull Lake Intrusion and associated intrusions. The 2,217- to 2,210-million-year-old Ungava magmatic event was the source for the Nipissing sills of Ontario and have been historically important for copper, silver, and arsenic mineralization, and also have the potential to contain platinum group metals. A third major event is the 1,885‑ to 1,865‑million-year-old magmatism of the Circum-Superior Belt surrounding much of the Superior craton from the Labrador Trough in Labrador and northeastern Quebec, though the Cape Smith Belt in northern Quebec, the Belcher Islands in southern Nunavut, the Fox River and Thompson belts in northern Manitoba, the Winnipegosis komatiite belt in central Manitoba, and on the southern side of the Superior craton in the Animikie Basin of northwestern Ontario. Included within the Circum-Superior large igneous province are major nickel deposits of the Thompson and Raglan belts, which were likely derived from more than one magma source. The major 1,267‑million-year-old Mackenzie dike swarm magmatism in the western part of the Canadian Shield is the host for the highly prospected Muskox intrusion. Another significant event was the magmatism that formed the 723‑million-year-old Franklin dike swarm of Northern Canada and has been heavily mined for nickel, copper, and platinum group metals. The 230‑million-year-old accreted oceanic plateau, Wrangellia in British Columbia and Yukon, has also been searched for nickel, copper, and platinum group metals.

=== Diatremes ===
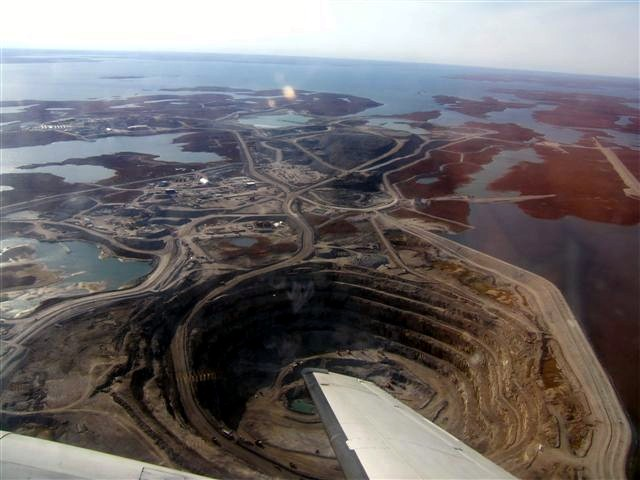
Diavik Diamond Mine in the Northwest Territories consists of three diatremes

The kimberlite diatremes, or pipes, across Canada have also been important economically, because kimberlite magmas are the world's main source of gem-quality diamonds. Kimberlite pipes form when kimberlite magmas rise considerably from depths as great as 400 kilometres (250 mi). As the kimberlite magmas approach a depth of at least 2 kilometres (1.2 mi), the magma explodes violently through the Earth's crust, carrying fragments of rock that it has collected along the way and, in the right conditions, possibly diamonds, to the surface. The Eocene (ca. 55–50 Ma) age diatremes of the Lac de Gras kimberlite field in the central Slave craton of the Northwest Territories support two world-class diamond mines, called Ekati and Diavik. Ekati, Canada's first diamond mine, has produced 40,000,000 carats (8,000 kg) of diamonds out of six open pits between 1998 and 2008, while Diavik, to the southeast, has produced 35,400,000 carats (7,080 kg) of diamonds since its foundation in 2003. The diamondiferous Drybones Bay kimberlite pipe is the largest diatreme discovered in the Northwest Territories, measuring 900 by 400 metres (3,000 ft × 1,300 ft). Diamondiferous diatremes throughout the Northwest Territories and Alberta have the potential to make Canada one of the world's major producers of gem-quality diamonds.

== Recent activity ==
Canada continues to be volcanically active, but the dispersed population has witnessed few eruptions due to the remoteness of the volcanoes and their low level of activity. The span of recorded and witnessed volcanic activity in Canada differs from region to region and at least two eruptions have been witnessed by people. Part of the Pacific Ring of Fire, more than 200 potentially active volcanoes exist throughout Canada, 49 of which have erupted in the past 10,000 years (Holocene). This is very recent in geological terms, suggesting volcanoes in Canada have ongoing activity. Ongoing scientific studies have indicated there have been earthquakes associated with at least ten Canadian volcanoes, including: Mount Garibaldi, Hoodoo Mountain, Castle Rock, Mount Cayley, The Volcano, Crow Lagoon, Silverthrone Caldera, Mount Meager massif, the Wells Gray-Clearwater volcanic field, and the Mount Edziza volcanic complex.

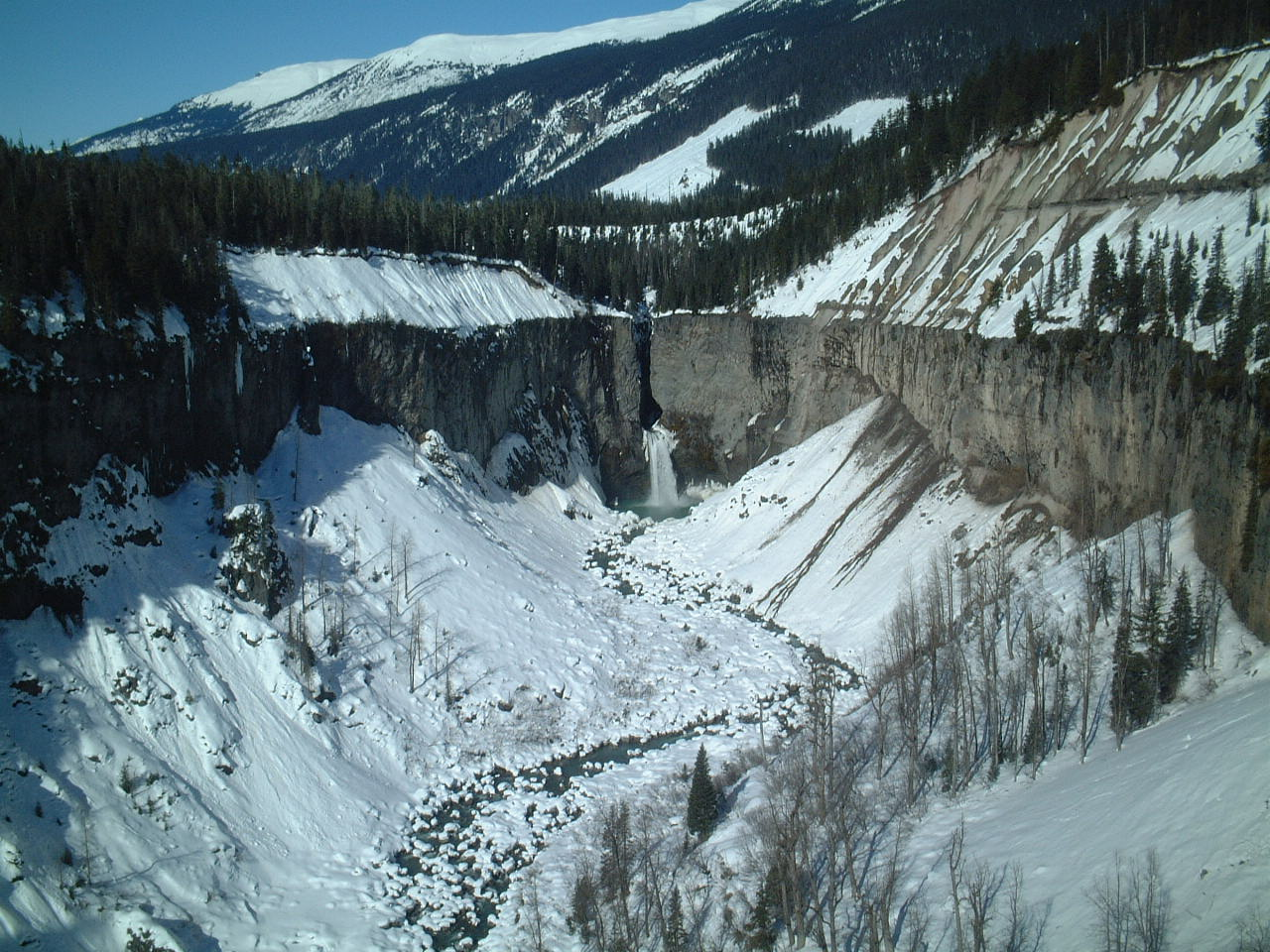
Keyhole Falls - all that grey is ash from the last time Mount Meager erupted 2,350 years ago

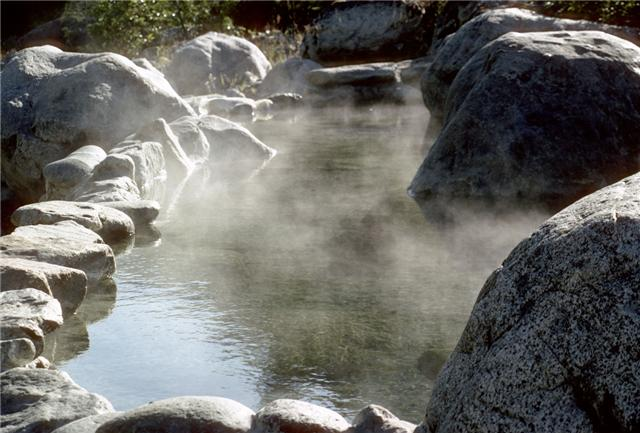
A volcanic hot spring pool near Meager Creek related to volcanism of the Mount Meager massif

The Mount Meager massif in the Garibaldi Volcanic Belt of southwestern British Columbia was the source for a massive (VEI-5) Plinian eruption 2,350 years ago similar in character to the 1980 eruption of Mount St. Helens in the U.S. state of Washington. The eruption originated from a vent on the northeast flank of Plinth Peak, the highest and one of four overlapping stratovolcanoes which together form the Mount Meager massif. This activity produced a diverse sequence of volcanic deposits, well exposed in bluffs along the 209 kilometres (130 mi) long Lillooet River, which are grouped as part of the Pebble Creek Formation. The explosive power associated with this Plinian eruption sent an ash column estimated to have risen at least 20 kilometres (12 mi) above Meager, indicating it entered the second major layer of the Earth's atmosphere. As prevailing winds sent ash and dust as far as 530 kilometres (330 mi) to the east, it created the large Bridge River Ash deposit, extending from Mount Meager to central Alberta. Pyroclastic flows travelled 7 kilometres (4 mi) downstream from the vent and buried trees along Meager's forested slopes, which were burned in place. An unusual, thick apron of welded vitrophyric breccia may represent the explosive collapse of a former lava dome which deposited ash several meters in thickness near the vent area. This collapse blocked the Lillooet River to a height of at least 100 metres (330 ft), forming a lake. The lake reached a maximum elevation of 810 metres (2,660 ft) and thus was at least 50 metres (160 ft) deep. The pyroclastic deposits blocking the Lillooet River eventually eroded from water activity, causing a massive outburst flood that sent small house-sized boulders down the Lillooet River valley, and formed 23 metres (75 ft) high Keyhole Falls. The final phase of activity produced a 2 kilometres (1.2 mi) long glassy dacite lava flow that varies from 15 to 20 m (49 to 66 ft) thick. This is the largest known explosive eruption in Canada in the past 10,000 years. Two clusters of hot springs are found at the Mount Meager massif, suggesting magmatic heat is still present and volcanic activity continues.

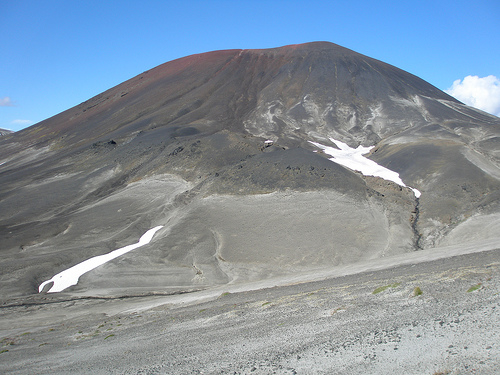
South side of Cocoa Crater

The massive Mount Edziza volcanic complex in the Northern Cordilleran Volcanic Province of northern British Columbia has had more than 20 eruptions throughout the past 10,000 years (Holocene), including Mess Lake Cone, Kana Cone, Cinder Cliff, Icefall Cone, Ridge Cone, Williams Cone, Walkout Creek Cone, Moraine Cone, Sidas Cone, Sleet Cone, Storm Cone, Triplex Cones, Twin Cone, Cache Hill, Camp Hill, Cocoa Crater, Coffee Crater, Nahta Cone, Tennena Cone, The Saucer, and the well-preserved Eve Cone. Active or recently active hot springs are found in several areas along the western flank of Edziza's lava plateau, including Elwyn springs (36 °C), Taweh springs (46 °C), and inactive springs near Mess Lake. All three hydrothermal areas are near the youngest lava fields on the lava plateau and are probably associated with the most recent volcanic activity at the Mount Edziza volcanic complex. An undated pumice deposit exists throughout the complex estimated to be younger than 500 years.

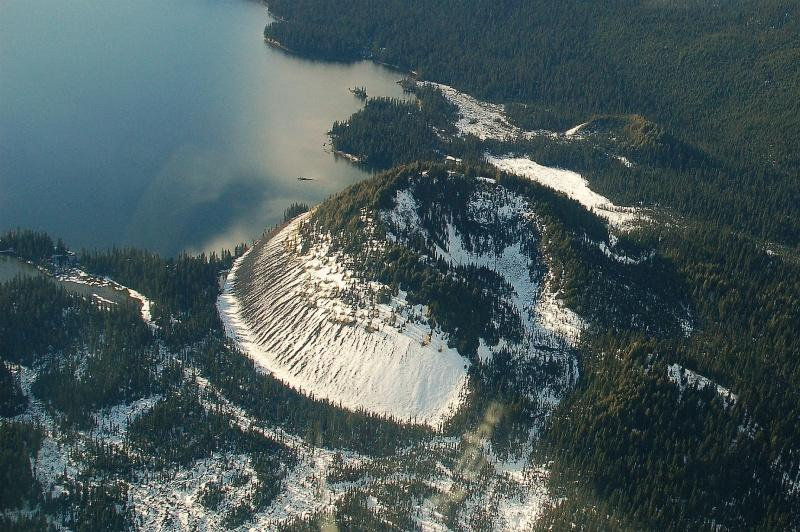
Kostal Cone in the Wells Gray-Clearwater volcanic field

Kostal Cone in the Wells Gray-Clearwater volcanic field of east-central British Columbia is a cinder cone responsible for basaltic lava flows comprising a lava bed, damming the southern end of McDougall Lake. There has been activity at this site as recently as 7,600 years ago at Dragon Cone, though more likely less than 1,000 years ago. Kostal Cone is too young for the potassium-argon dating technique (usable on specimens over 100,000 years old), and no charred organic material for radiocarbon dating has been found. However, the uneroded structure of the cone with the existence of trees on its flanks and summit have made it an area for dendrochronology studies, which reveals the growth of tree-ring patterns. Tree-ring dating has revealed an age of about 400 years for Kostal Cone, indicating it formed around 1500. This makes Kostal Cone the youngest volcano in the Wells Gray-Clearwater volcanic field and thus one of the youngest in Canada.

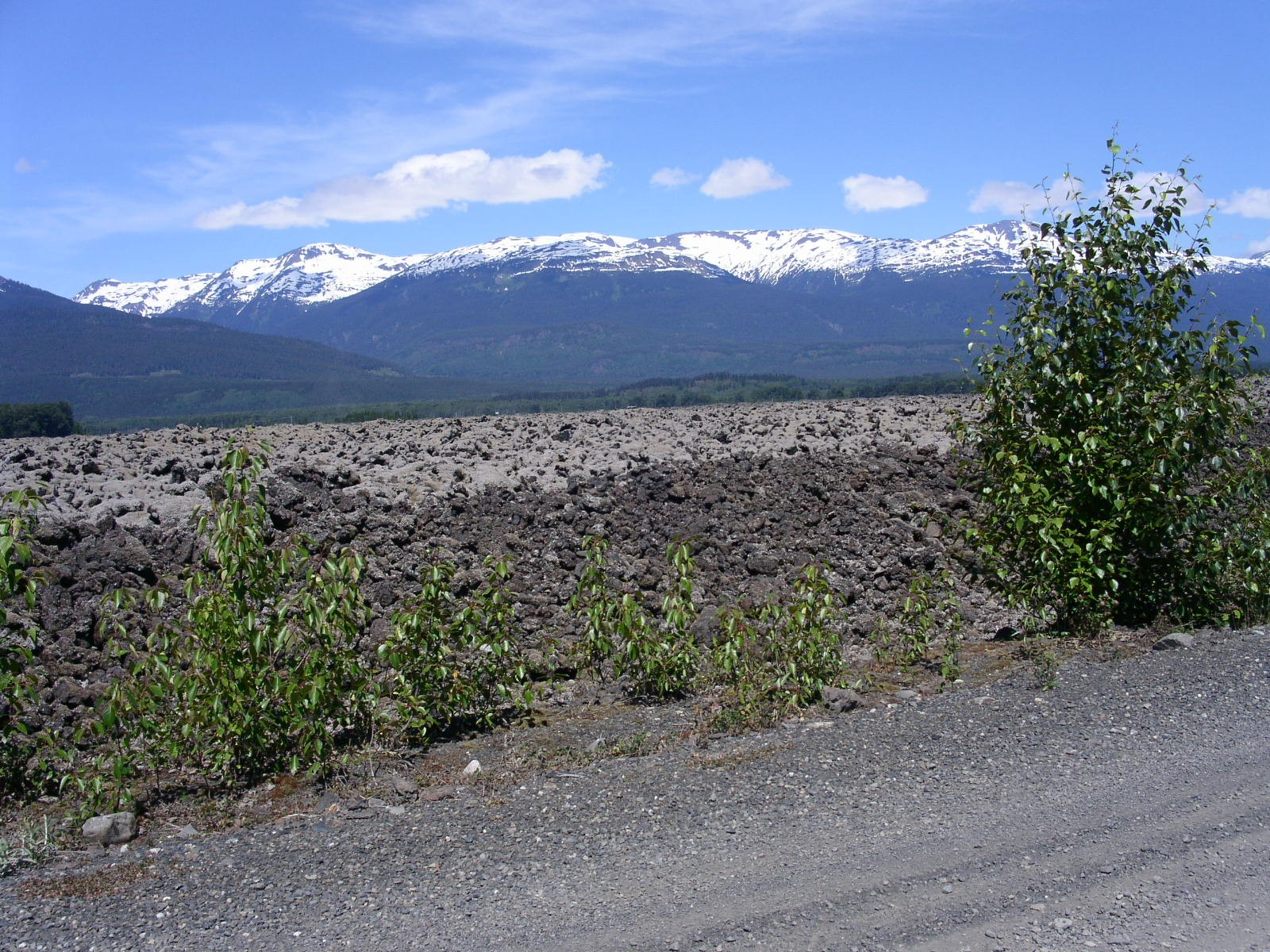
Nass valley lava beds erupted from Tseax Cone in 1750 or 1775

Tseax Cone, a young cinder cone at the southernmost end of the Northern Cordilleran Volcanic Province, was the source for a major basalt lava flow eruption around the years 1750 and 1775 that travelled into the Tseax River, damming it and forming Lava Lake. The lava flow subsequently travelled 11 kilometres (7 mi) north to the Nass River, where it filled the flat valley floor for an additional 10 kilometres (6 mi), making the entire lava flow 22.5 kilometres (14.0 mi) long. Native legends from Nisga'a people in the area tell of a prolonged period of disruption by the volcano, including the destruction of two Nisga'a villages known as Lax Ksiluux and Wii Lax K'abit. Nisga'a people dug pits for shelter but at least 2,000 Nisga'a people were killed due to volcanic gases and poisonous smoke (most likely carbon dioxide). This is Canada's worst known geophysical disaster. It is the only eruption in Canada for which legends of First Nations people have been proven true. As of 1993, the Tseax Cone quietly rests in Nisga'a Memorial Lava Bed Provincial Park.

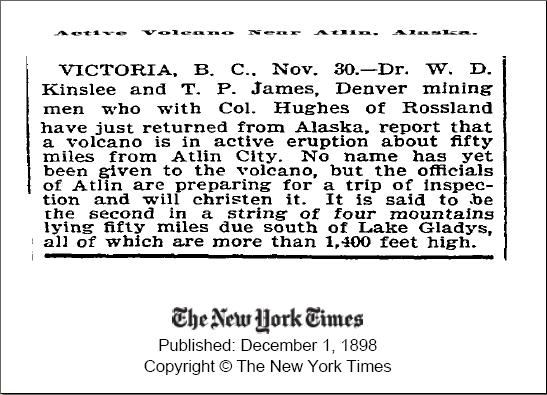
The eruption report in the Atlin area of northwestern British Columbia, Canada (formerly in Alaska, United States) by The New York Times on December 1, 1898

An eruption was reported by placer miners on November 8, 1898 in the Atlin Volcanic Field of the Northern Cordilleran Volcanic Province adjacent to Ruby Mountain volcano 80 kilometres (50 mi) south of Gladys Lake when volcanic ash was said to be falling for many days. During the eruption the adjacent placer miners were able to work at nights due to incandescent glow from the eruption. A news report published on December 1, 1898 by the American newspaper publisher The New York Times stated: Kinslee and T. P. James, Denver mining men who with Col. Hughes of Rossland have just returned from Alaska, report that a volcano is in active eruption about fifty miles from Atlin City. No name has yet been given to the volcano, but the officials of Atlin are preparing for a trip of inspection and will christen it. It is said to be the second in a string of four mountains lying fifty miles due south of Lake Gladys, all of which are more than 1,400 feet high. In 1898 the Atlin area was in dispute with the Alaska-British Columbia boundary, leading American news broadcasters stating the Atlin area was in Alaska rather than in northwestern British Columbia. This Alaska-British Columbia boundary dispute was eventually resolved by arbitration in 1903 and no evidence for the 1898 eruption has been found, leading researchers to speculate about the eruption and report it as uncertain.

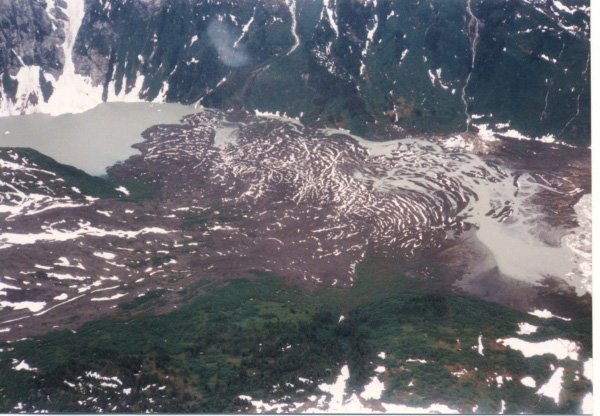
Recently erupted pahoehoe lava flow at the Blue River

The Volcano at the southern end of the Northern Cordilleran Volcanic Province just north of the Alaska-British Columbia boundary is probably the youngest in Canada. It is a poorly built cinder cone made of loose volcanic ash, lapilli-sized tephra and volcanic bombs. Lying above a remote mountain ridge in the Boundary Ranges of the Coast Mountains, it is responsible for lava flow eruptions in 1904 and older that traveled south 5 kilometres (3 mi) through river valleys where they crossed the border into the U.S. state of Alaska and dammed the Blue River, a short tributary of the Unuk River. In doing so it formed several small lakes. This eruption had a massive effect on fish, plant and animal inhabitants of the valley, but there is no record of its impact on people, most likely because people were not in the remote area. The entire length of the lava flows are at least 22 kilometres (14 mi) and still contain the original lava features from when they were erupted, including pressure ridges and lava channels. However, sections of the lava flows have collapsed into underlying lava tubes to form cavities. Tephra and scoria from The Volcano covers adjacent mountain ridges and even through it is very young, it has been reduced by erosion from alpine glacial ice found in the heavily glaciated Coast Mountains. The estimated volume of lava and ash from The Volcano is 2.2 km^{3} (1 cu mi).

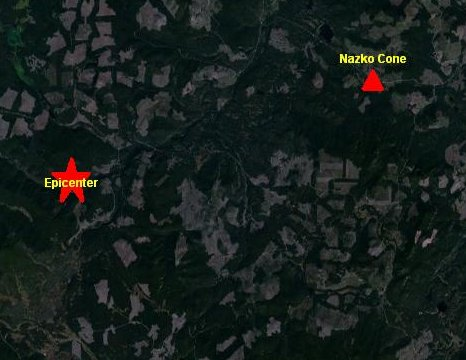
Map of the Nazko earthquake swarm in 2007

A series of earthquakes of less than magnitude 3.0 were recorded by seismographs in the Baezaeko River region 20 kilometres (12 mi) west of Nazko Cone in the Anahim Volcanic Belt on October 9, 2007. The cause of these earthquakes was magma intruding into rock 25 kilometres (16 mi) below the surface. Since then more than 1,000 small earthquakes have been recorded. Because of the small size of the earthquake swarms, Natural Resources Canada has added more seismographs in the region for better location and depth accuracy. However, the size and number of the 2007 earthquake swarms indicate there is currently no threat of an eruption. Before magma could erupt in the area adjacent to Nazko Cone, it is expected the size and number of the earthquakes would rise considerably, presaging an eruption.

== Mitigation and vulnerability ==
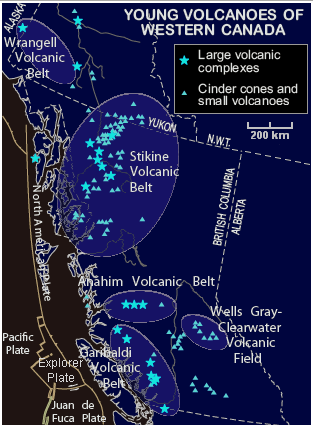
Map of young volcanoes in Northern and Western Canada and adjacent regions

In Canada, even though volcanoes pose significant threats to local communities and any sizable eruption would affect Canada's economy, the work of understanding the frequency and eruption characteristics at volcanoes in Canada is a slow process. This is because most of Canada's dormant and potentially active volcanoes are located in isolated jagged regions, very few scientists study Canadian volcanoes and the provision of money in the Canadian government is limited. Because of these issues, scientists studying Canada's volcanoes have a basic understanding of Canada's volcanic heritage and how it might impact people in the future. Volcanologists are aware that certain areas in Canada have higher levels of volcanic activity than others and how eruptions in these areas might affect people and the environment they live in. When a volcano is showing evidence of volcanic activity, quick action will be required to better understand the process. The lowest possibility for an eruption in Canada per year is approximately 1/200; for a passive lava eruption the possibility is about 1/220, and for a major explosive eruption it is about 1/3333. Even though volcanoes do not seem to be part of the everyday reality of Canadians, recurrent earthquakes and the formation of large mountain ranges in the Pacific Northwest indicate this part of Canada is still geologically active. The possibility of an eruption, even a large explosive one, cannot be ruled out. Quiet as they currently seem, volcanoes in Northern and Western Canada are part of the Pacific Ring of Fire. Along with volcanoes associated with recent earthquake activity, a scenario of an eruption at Mount Cayley in southwestern British Columbia illustrates how Western Canada is in danger to a volcanic eruption, which has not erupted for at least 310,000 years. This impact is becoming even more likely as population in the Pacific Northwest increases and development spreads. The scenario is based on former eruptions in the north-south trending Garibaldi Volcanic Belt and includes both explosive and passive eruptions. Its effect is mostly due to the attention of defenseless public services in canyons. However, the threat from volcanoes outside of Canada seems much greater than the threat from volcanoes within Canada because of the lack of monitoring data at Canadian volcanoes and the age of most volcanoes in Canada is poorly known. But for some, their minimal degree of erosion indicates they formed much less than 10,000 years ago, including the Milbanke Sound Group on Price Island, Dufferin Island, Swindle Island, Lake Island, and Lady Douglas Island in the Milbanke Sound area of coastal British Columbia. However, it is known volcanoes in the U.S. states of Alaska, Washington, Oregon and California have been more active in historic times than those within Canada. Therefore, volcanoes in the United States are monitored with caution and attention by the United States Geological Survey.

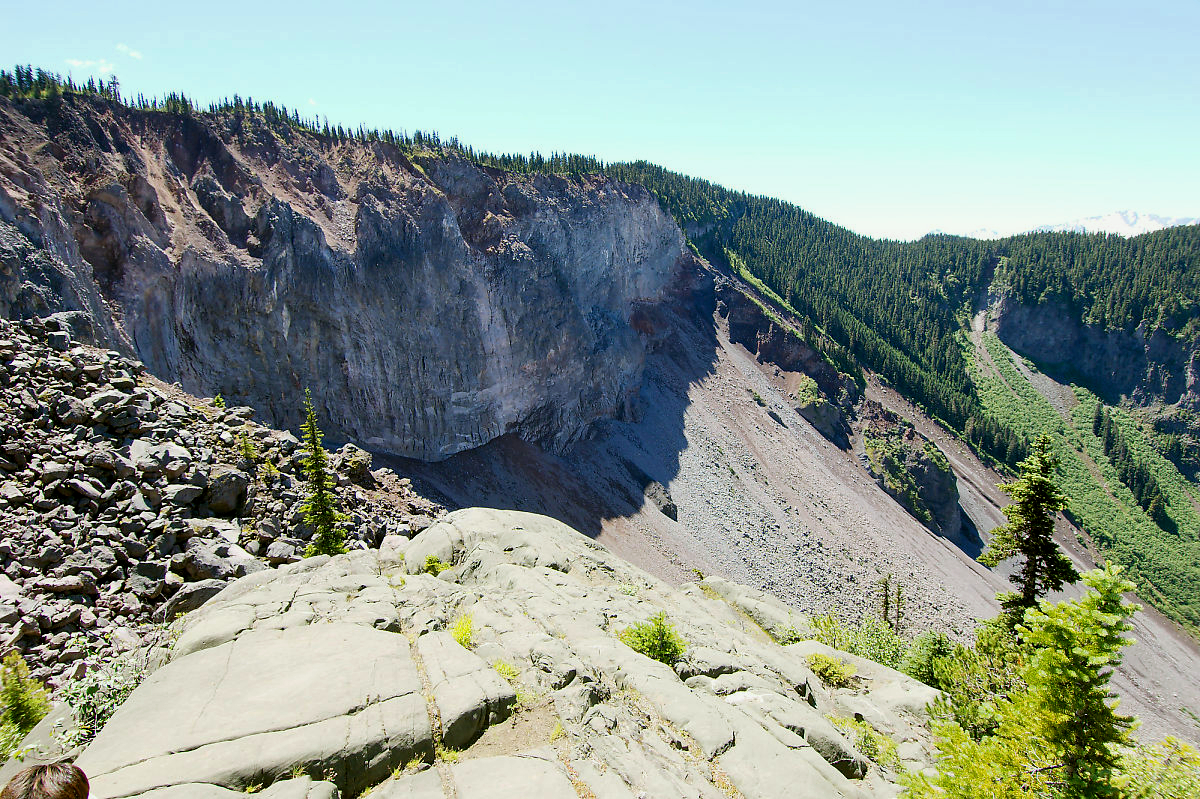
The Barrier in the Garibaldi Volcanic Belt poses a geohazard in southwestern British Columbia.

Growing awareness of volcanism, especially the threat from volcanoes in the United States, has led to a number of changes in the way Canadians are dealing with volcanic hazards. For example, The Barrier, an unstable lava dam retaining the Garibaldi Lake system of southwestern British Columbia, has in the past unleashed several debris flows, most recently in 1855–1856. This led to the evacuation of the small resort village of Garibaldi nearby and the relocation of residents to new recreational subdivisions away from the hazard zone. Should The Barrier completely collapse, Garibaldi Lake would be entirely released and downstream damage in the Cheakamus and Squamish rivers would be considerable, including major damage to the town of Squamish and possibly an impact-wave on the waters of Howe Sound that would reach Vancouver Island. The Interagency Volcanic Event Notification Plan, Canada's volcanic emergency notification program, was established to outline the notification procedure of some of the main agencies that would be involved in response to a volcanic eruption in Canada, an eruption close to Canada's borders, or an eruption significant enough to have an effect on Canada and its people. It focuses primarily on aviation safety because jet aircraft can quickly enter areas of volcanic ash. The program notifies all impacted agencies that have to deal with volcanic events. Aircraft are rerouted away from hazardous ash and people on the ground are notified of potential ash fall.

=== Monitoring ===
Currently no volcanoes in Canada are monitored closely enough by the Geological Survey of Canada to ascertain how active their magma chambers are. An existing network of seismographs has been established to monitor tectonic earthquakes and is too far away to provide a good indication of what is happening beneath them. It may sense an increase in activity if a volcano becomes very restless, but this may only provide a warning for a large eruption. It might detect activity only once a volcano has started erupting.

== See also ==
- List of volcanoes in Canada
- Geography of Canada
