= Circum-Superior Belt =

Paleoproterozoic large igneous province in the Canadian Shield

- Large igneous province
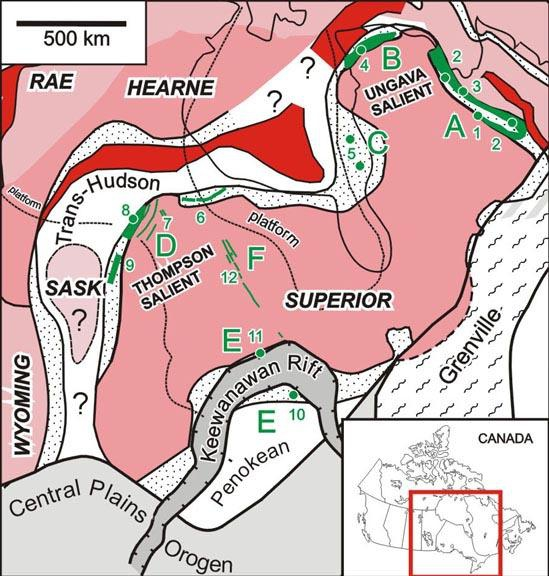
- Map of cratons, orogenies and the Circum-Superior Belt. Areas associated with the Circum-Superior Belt include: A = New Quebec Orogen, B = Cape Smith Belt, C = Eastern Hudson Bay, D = Thompson region, E = Animikie Basin, F = Western interior of Superior craton.
- Location: Manitoba, Ontario, Nunavut, Quebec
- Part of: Canadian Shield
- Age: Paleoproterozoic

The Circum-Superior Belt is a widespread Paleoproterozoic large igneous province in the Canadian Shield of Northern, Western and Eastern Canada. It extends more than 3,400 km (2,100 mi) from northeastern Manitoba through northwestern Ontario, southern Nunavut to northern Quebec and into western Labrador. Igneous rocks of the Circum-Superior Belt are mafic-ultramafic in composition, deposited in the Labrador Trough near Ungava Bay, the Cape Smith Belt near the southern shore of Hudson Strait and along the eastern shore of Hudson Bay in its northern portion; the Thompson and Fox River belts in the northwest and the Marquette Range Supergroup in its southern portion. The Circum Superior Belt also hosts a rare example of Proterozoic Komatiite, in the Winnipegosis komatiite belt.

A number of magmatic features are present in the Circum-Superior Belt, including dikes, sills and volcanics that comprise geologic formations. This geologic belt is considered to be a large igneous province because its magmatic rocks were emplaced over an extremely short geological time span. Even though the Circum-Superior Belt was emplaced during an extremely short geological time span, the associated magmas were probably derived from a number of separate sources.

Most of the Circum-Superior Belt lies along the margin of the Superior Craton, which is the most extensive fragment of Archean crust on Earth. The Circum-Superior Belt contains two large copper-nickel mining districts; the nickel-bearing Thompson Belt at the northwestern portion of the Superior craton and the Cape Smith Belt at the northern portion of the Circum-Superior Belt.

== Geology ==
=== Formation ===
The Circum-Superior Belt was formed 1,884 to 1,870 million years ago when the Superior craton was surrounded by mountain building processes, including the Trans-Hudson, New Quebec and Penokean orogenies. The major Trans-Hudson orogeny had its appearance when the Superior craton collided with the Rae-Hearne and Sask cratons 1,900 to 1,800 million years ago. Massive orogenic belts with a change in horizontal direction are represented by the double promontory structure of the Superior craton that seem to have come from the beginning of a rifting event. The New Quebec orogen, also known as the Labrador Trough, lies at the northeastern portion of the Superior craton and is related to ocean closure and collision with the southeastern portion of the Rae craton. At 1,900 and 1,800 million years ago, an ocean closure and collision with the Wisconian arc terrane resulted in the creation of the Penokean orogeny at the southern Superior craton margin. The last collision occurred on the southeastern portion of the Superior craton to produce the Grenville orogeny 1,100 million years ago.

Because most of the Circum-Superior Belt was formed by widespread mafic-ultramafic magmatism 1,884 to 1,870 million years ago along the Superior craton margin during these orogenies, a number of different suggestions have been made to explain the questionable origins of this large igneous province. It is also not clear if the Circum-Superior Belt has a single origin or it has several origins. Suggestions include back-arc rifting, foredeep flexure, mantle plumes and the breakup of a microcontinent. The geochemical indication of the Circum-Superior Belt is also poorly known; either it contains major regional differences or it is the same throughout the magmatic zone. With the discovery of the Pickle Crow dike swarm throughout the western Superior craton, the likelihood of other 1,880 million year old dike groups throughout the Superior craton remains. This is partly because several dike zones in the Superior craton remain undated. The relationship of the Circum-Superior Belt with similar age magmatism throughout the nearby Trans-Hudson belt and elsewhere on Earth is also unknown. This includes the 1,860 million year old magmatism of the East Kimberly event in Australia and 1,860 million year old magmatism of the Mashonaland event in Africa. The other questionable suggestion related to the Circum-Superior Belt is the existence of a suggested 1,900 million year old global superplume event.

=== Geologic features ===
The 1,600 km (990 mi) long Labrador Trough, extending from Ungava Bay through Quebec and Labrador, includes two volcano-sedimentary series, the first ranging from 2,170 to 2,140 million years old and second ranging from 1,883 to 1,870 million years old. This magmatism is considered to have formed as a result of back-arc volcanism. The youngest magmatic series (1883-1870 Ma) contains 1,880 million-year-old carbonatites and lamprophyres. 1,883 to 1,874 million-year-old mafic and a few ultramafic magmas comprise the Willbob and Hellancourt formations and Montagnais sills. The youngest magmatism of the youngest magmatic series is 1,870 million-year-old felsic and carbonatitic volcanics. These igneous rocks of the Labrador Trough cover an area of 30,000 km^{2} (12,000 mi^{2}).

To the northwest at the northern tip of Quebec near Hudson Strait, the Cape Smith Belt includes the 2,040 to 1,970 million-year-old Povungnituk volcano-sedimentary group and the 1,880 million-year-old Chukotat Group. The 5.6 km (3.5 mi) thick Chukotat Group is made of picritic and tholeiitic basalts. These basaltic lavas are intruded by narrow mafic and ultramafic sills. At least three different types of lava compositions exist in the Chukotat Group, including olivine phyric, pyroxene-phyric and plagioclase phyric. The upper unit of the Chukotat Group is 1,870 million years old whereas the lower unit is associated with the Katiniq Suite sills, which cut through the underlying Povungnituk Group. In 1989, the Katiniq Suite sills were thought to be 1,918 million years old, but more recent dating and a reinterpretation of the original age in 2004 suggests that the Katiniq Suite sills are closer to 1,880 million years old. Therefore, the age range for the Chutotat Group is 1,880 to 1,870 million years. Volcanism of the Chukotat Group might have originated from rifting of a microcontinent that now forms the southwestern portion of Baffin Island.

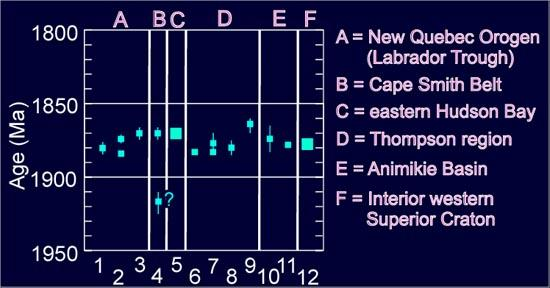
Map showing the age of geologic features related to the Circum-Superior Belt. Geologic features include: 1 = Carbonatite feeder, 2 = Montagnais gabbro sills, 3 = rhyodacite, 4 = Chukotat volcanics, 5 = Belcher and Sleeper Island sills, 6 = Fox River sill, 7 = Molsen dikes, 8 = Thompson belt mafic-untramafic magmatism, 9 = Winnipegosis komatiite, 10 = Hemlock formation, 11 = Gunflint formation, 12 = Pickle Crow dike.

On the Belcher Islands of southern Nunavut, two volcanic groups are known as the Flaherty and Eskimo volcanics. The underlying Eskimo volcanics are related with the Richmond Gulf, Persillon, Pachi and Nastapoka Group volcanics. The 1,998 million-year-old Minto dikes are also interpreted to be related with the Eskimo volcanics. The overlying Flaherty volcanics remain undated apart from a lead-lead dating of 1,960 +/- 80 million years. However, the Flaherty volcanics are suggested to have relationships with the Sutton Inlier and Haig sills. Geochemical indications suggest that the overlying Flaherty volcanics might also have relationships with the Povungnituk volcano-sedimentary group in the Cape Smith Belt, indicating the Flaherty volcanics might be 2,040 to 1,960 million years old. Sills on the Belcher and Snowy islands in Hudson Bay are dated to 1,870 million years old, indicating the 1,880 million-year-old magmatism also exists in this section of the Circum–Superior large igneous province.

The Fox River Belt in northern Manitoba is composed of sediments, volcanics and sills. Fox River Belt sills and Molsen dikes are 1,883 million years old, but the Molsen dikes at the northwestern Superior craton margin intrude an older, 2,090 to 2,070 million-year-old dike swarm. The Ospwagan Group is younger than 1974 +/- 50 million years old and the 1,864 million-year-old Winnipegosis komatiite belt lies to the southwest. Numerous tectonic settings have been suggested for triggering magmatism in the Fox River Belt, including a marginal basin rifting event.

At the southern portion of the Circum-Superior Belt, a group of fragmental sediments composed of iron formation was formed during a period of magmatic activity in the Marquette Range Supergroup. Included in the Marquette Range Supergroup is the Hemlock Formation, a bimodal volcanic group that is estimated to have an age of 1874 +/- 9 million years. Another volcanic series in the Marquette Range Supergroup, known as the Gunflint Formation, has an age of 1878.3 +/- 1.3 million years. Further geologic units that are related to the Gunflint Formation include the Badwater volcanics and the Kiernan sills. A number of origins have suggested for the Marquette Range Supergroup magmatism. This includes subsidence being driven ahead related to thrusting of the Penokean orogeny or a possible back-arc basin, and lateral flow through the Pickle Crow dikes transported magma from the Fox River Belt area through the Superior craton for placement in the Marquette Range Supergroup. This suggested long-range origin has been suggested for magmatism of the 2,215 million-year-old Nipissing sills as well, which the Ungava dike swarm could have transported magma to the Nipissing sills area.

Before 2003, all magmatism of the Circum-Superior Belt was thought to only occur along the outer margin of the Superior craton. However, the Pickle Crow dike was discovered in 2003 in the interior of the Superior craton and it has since been recognized as a magmatic event related to the Circum-Superior Belt. The dike is dated to 1,880 million years old and associated dikes are traced for at least 400 km (250 mi). These dikes likely extend over 700 km (430 mi) across the western portion of the Superior craton from near the Fox River Belt in the north to near Lake Superior in the south. This magmatic crossing creates a relationship with the 1,880 million-year-old magmatism in the northwestern portion of the Circum-Superior Belt and magmatism in the Marguette Range Supergroup on the southern portion of the Circum-Superior Belt. In addition, the north-northwest trend of the Pickle Crow dikes and the absolute north-northeastern trend of the Molson dike swarm combine to an area north of the northwestern portion of the Circum-Superior Belt. This might determine the zone of a mantle plume that was the source for the 1,880 million-year-old magmatism in the Circum-Superior Belt.

=== Mineralization ===
The Circum-Superior Belt is the host for widespread mineral deposits, including copper, nickel and platinum group elements. However, the origins of this widespread mineralization is unknown. The Thompson Belt in Manitoba is one of the most comprehensive nickel producing zones on Earth. It has the potential to contain platinum group elements, but the age of the mafic-ultramafic volcanic rocks comprising the nickel deposits are not well known. Since its foundation during the 1950s, numerous mining operations throughout the Thompson Belt have produced over four billion pounds of nickel. At least two nickel deposits are in progress by Vale Inco at the Thompson and Birchtree mines. At least 70 million pounds of nickel has been mined since 2005. At the city of Thompson, nickel of the Thompson Belt is smelted and refined in facilities. This smelting and refining process contributes to about one-third of the total nickel output in Canada.

In the Cape Smith Belt of northern Quebec, the Raglan Mine lies in copper-nickel deposits of the ultramafic Katiniq Suite sills. The Katiniq Suite sills are also within an area that is presently explored for nickel, copper and platinum group element deposits. Copper, nickel and platinum group elements are associated with mafic-ultramafic rocks in the Labrador Trough that were formed during a period of magmatism 1,883 to 1,870 million years ago.

== See also ==
- Volcanology of Canada
- Volcanology of Eastern Canada
- Volcanology of Northern Canada
- Volcanology of Western Canada
