= Winnipegosis komatiite belt =

Greenstone belt in central Manitoba, Canada

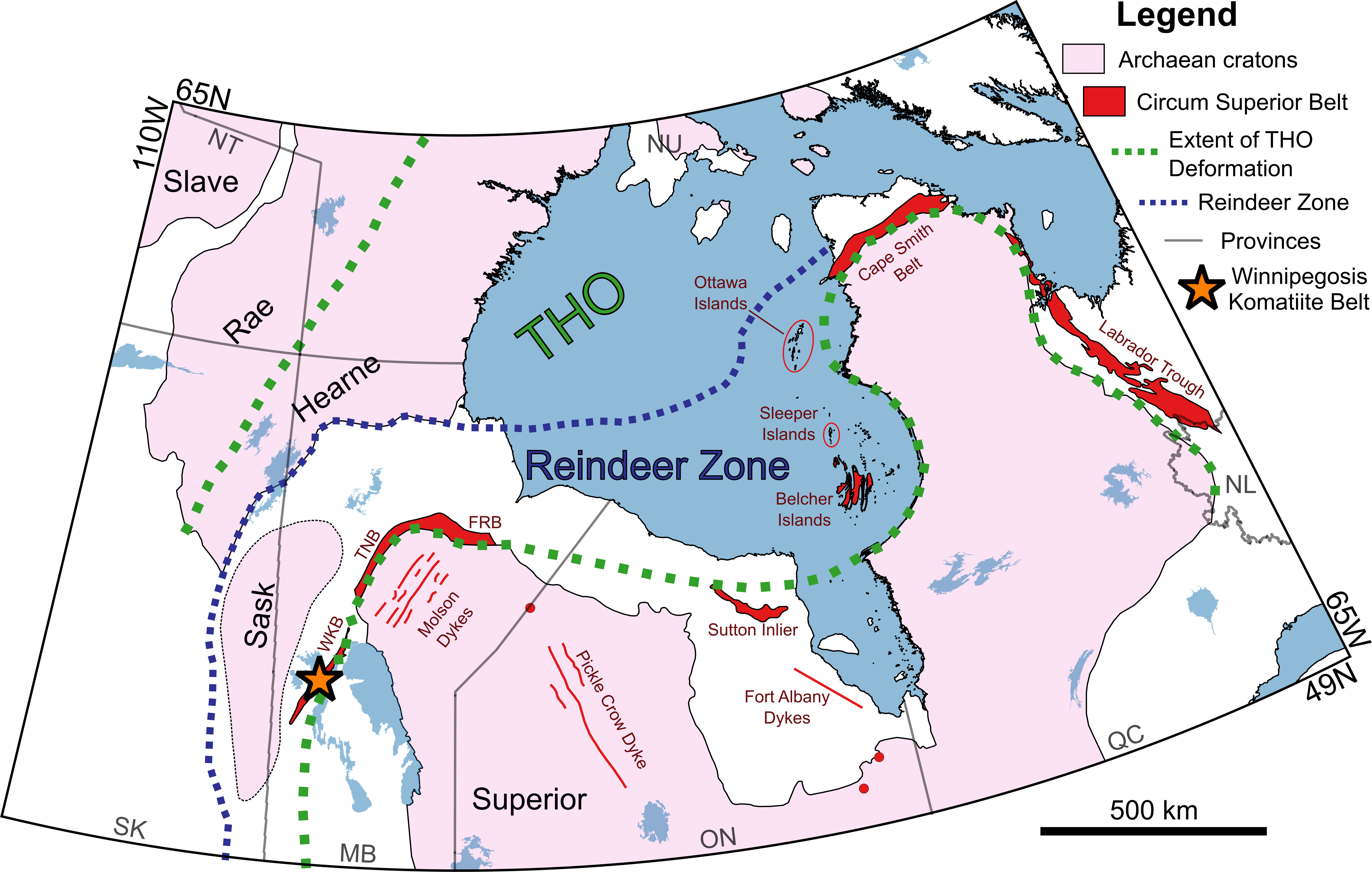
Location of the Winnipegosis Komatiite Belt in relation to the Circum-Superior Belt (CSB) and Trans-Hudson Orogen (THO). CSB exposures on the Ottawa and Sleeper Islands are circled due to their small size. CSB-related mafic dykes and carbonatite complexes are shown as thick red lines and dots, respectively. Boundaries of cratons and CSB shown are surface exposures except Sask craton and WKB, which are not exposed at the surface, approximate subsurface extents are shown. All other geology is not subdivided (white areas). Blue areas indicate water bodies. WKB = Winnipegosis Komatiite Belt, TNB = Thompson Nickel Belt, FRB = Fox River Belt. Blue dotted line indicates the extent of the Reindeer Zone, the juvenile core of the THO. Based on work from these references.

The Winnipegosis komatiite belt is a 150 km (93 mi) long and 30 km (19 mi) wide greenstone belt located in the Lake Winnipegosis area of central Manitoba, Canada. It has no surface exposure and was identified based on geophysical signatures and drilling during mineral exploration by Cominco during the 1990s. The belt has an age of 1870 ± 7 million years and is predominantly composed of basaltic and komatiitic volcanic rocks with minor intrusive and sedimentary rocks. The belt is considered part of the larger Circum-Superior Belt and was likely generated by a mantle plume. The Winnipegosis Komatiite Belt is notable as one of the few examples of komatiite formed during the Proterozoic.

== Geological setting ==
The Winnipegosis Komatiite Belt is in the Superior Boundary Zone, in Manitoba, Canada, adjacent to the Thompson Nickel Belt. The Superior Boundary Zone lies along the northwestern margin of the Archaean Superior Craton, and forms the eastern foreland of the ~1.8-billion-year-old Trans-Hudson Orogen. The Trans-Hudson Orogen was a continental collision that formed following the closure of the ancient Manikewan Ocean. It resulted in the juxtaposition of the Superior Craton with the amalgamated Rae and Hearne Cratons, and a number of continental fragments, including the Sask Craton. Closure of the Manikewan Ocean is believed to have begun by 1915 million years ago, though the first evidence of this ocean closure along the western Superior margin is the initiation of magmatism in the 1890-million-year-old Snow Lake Arc, interpreted as a subduction zone that formed outboard (towards the ocean) from the Superior Boundary Zone. Mafic to ultramafic magmatism in the Winnipegosis Komatiite Belt is contemporaneous with ongoing magmatism in the Snow Lake Arc, which implies the Winnipegosis Komatiite Belt formed along a convergent plate boundary. The Winnipegosis Komatiite Belt forms part of the ~3000 km Circum-Superior Belt, considered a mantle-plume-derived large igneous province.

The Winnipegosis Komatiite Belt itself predominantly consists of tholeiitic basalt and komatiite, intercalated with lesser amounts of shale and dolomitic sediments, and intruded by mafic and ultramafic cumulates. These overlie a thin interval of conglomerate and sandstone, which lies unconformably on Superior Craton tonalites dated to 2792 million years old. The entire belt underwent sub–greenschist to greenschist facies metamorphism, during the Trans-Hudson Orogeny.

== Winnipegosis Komatiites ==
=== Flow styles and petrography ===
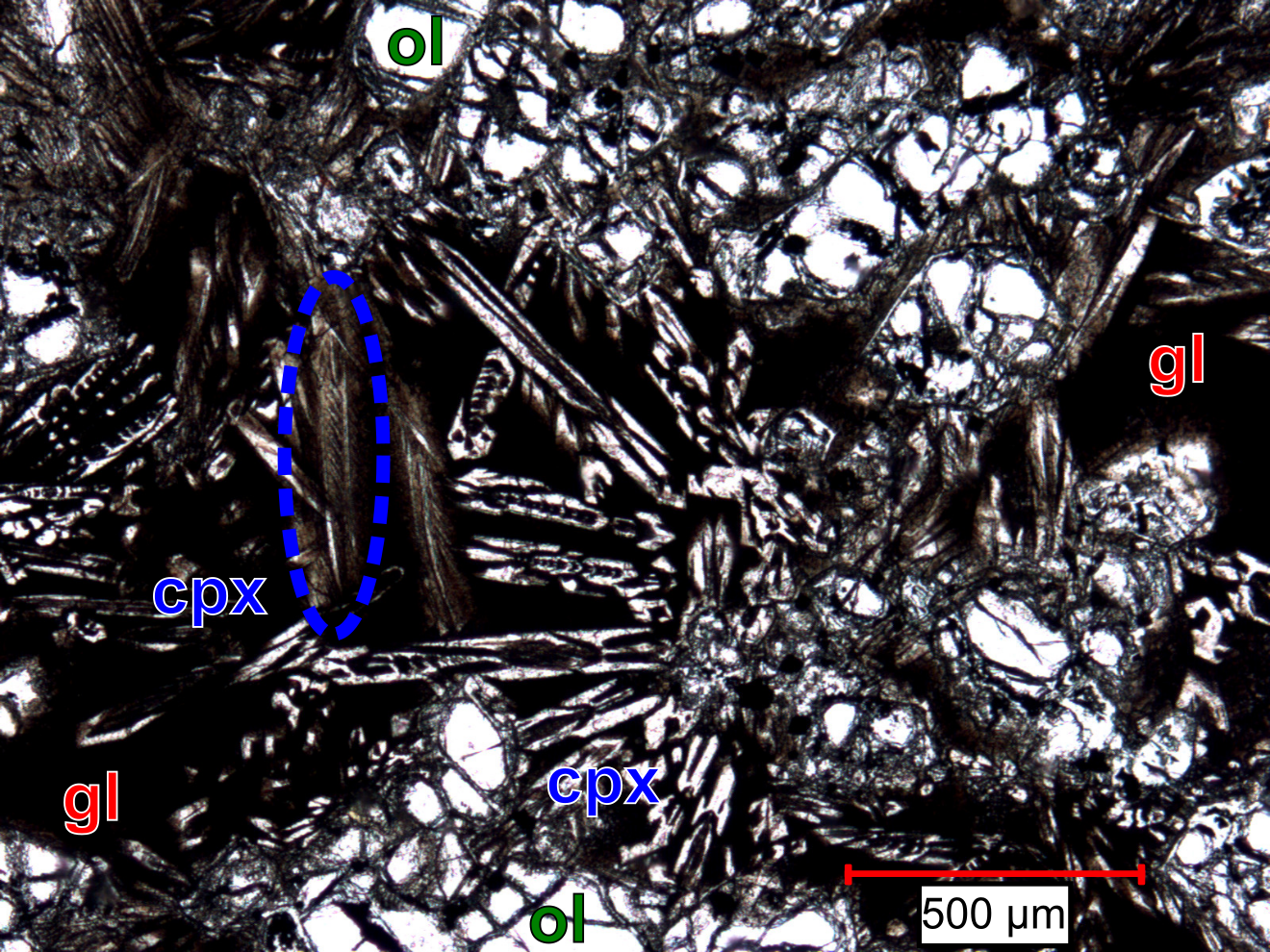
Dendritic clinopyroxene textures in massive Winnipegosis Komatiite flows. Ol = olivine, cpx = clinopyroxene, gl = glass. Both 'swallowtail' and 'feathery' clinopyroxene dendrites are visible.

The Winnipegosis Komatiites are found as a number of stacked lava flows in boreholes drilled into the Winnipegosis Komatiite Belt. Two main flow types are found: massive and differentiated flows. The massive flows have largely consistent compositions, mineral assemblages, and textures throughout. Olivine and chromite are the only phenocryst minerals and are evenly distributed within each flow. Groundmass phases include dendritic clinopyroxene, serpentinised dendritic olivine, and devitrified glass. Dendritic clinopyroxenes have spectacular textures including 'feathery' and 'swallowtail' varieties. The differentiated flows are separated into a cumulate layer at the base, and a spinifex layer at the top of each flow. The cumulate layers form by downwards sinking of olivine and chromite crystals through the lava, and have a thick layer of equant cumulate olivine overlain by a thin layer of large, skeletal 'hopper' olivine crystals. The spinifex layers form by growth of skeletal crystals from the top of the flow, and contain a range of textures and mineral assemblages, including random olivine spinifex and acicular clinopyroxene layers.

== See also ==
- Volcanism of Canada
- Volcanism of Western Canada
