= Smith Island (Hudson Bay, Nunavut) =

Island in Nunavut, Canada

Native name: Qikirtajuaq
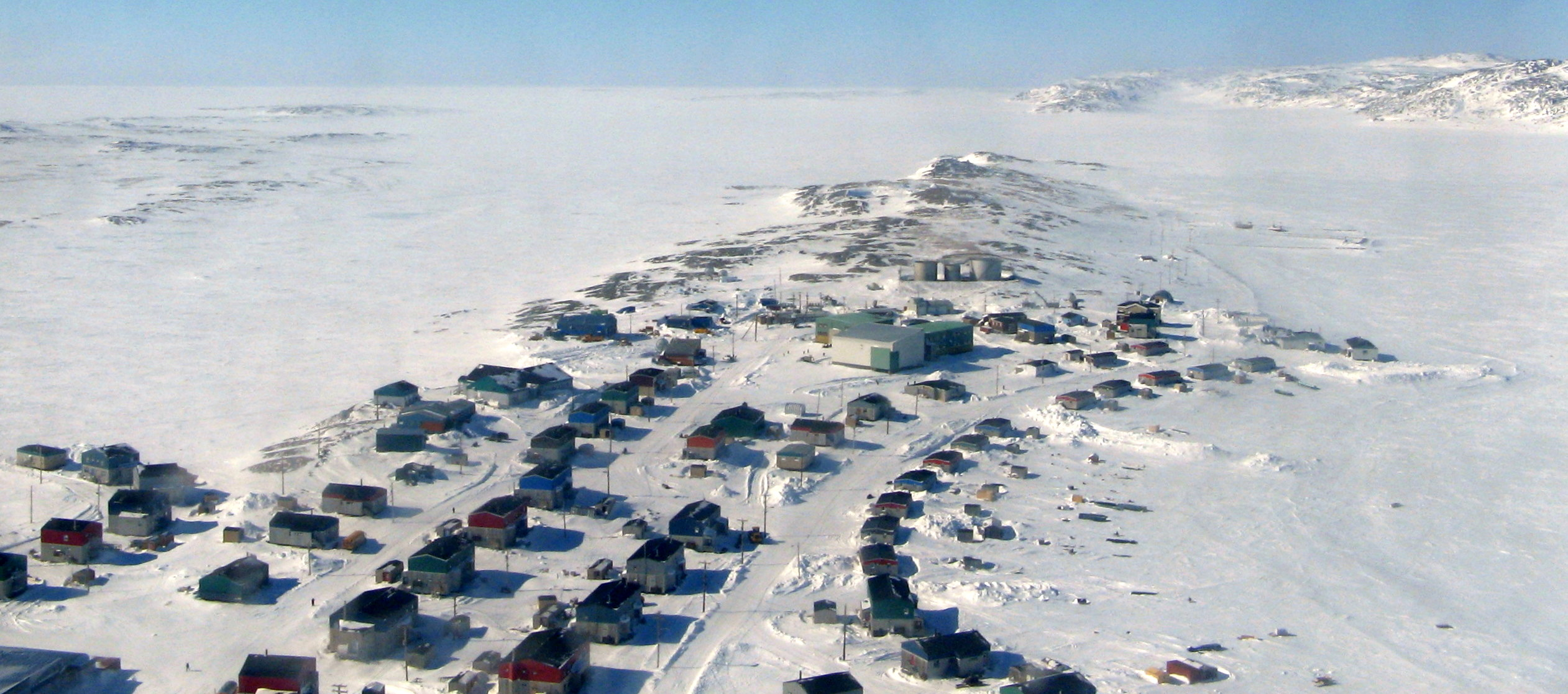
- Smith Island in the distance, seen from Akulivik

- Location within Nunavut Location within Canada

Geography
- Location: Hudson Bay
- Coordinates: 60.77°N 78.46°W
- Archipelago: Arctic Archipelago
- Area: 131 km^{2} (51 sq mi)
- Length: 25.5 km (15.84 mi)

Administration
- Canada
- Territory: Nunavut
- Region: Qikiqtaaluk

Demographics
- Population: Uninhabited

Smith Island (also called Cape Smith Island) is a northern Canadian island in eastern Hudson Bay. It is a part of Qikiqtaaluk Region in the territory of Nunavut, though situated 2 km (1.2 mi) off the western coast of Quebec's Ungava Peninsula, right where the Inuit village of Akulivik is located.

The island was named in 1750 after Sir Thomas Smith, a merchant and first Governor of The Company of Adventurers, and is also called Qikirtajuaq by the Inuit, who use it as one of their traditional hunting grounds. The island is home to several significant archaeological sites from Thule and Paleo-Eskimo periods.

Cape Smith is the western-most point of the island, as well as the name of a locality on the southern coast of the island, the site of a former Hudson's Bay Company post. It also gave its name to the Cape Smith Belt, an ophiolite that stretches across the entire Ungava Peninsula.

The island is the summer habitat of large flocks of snow geese and Canada geese.

== History ==
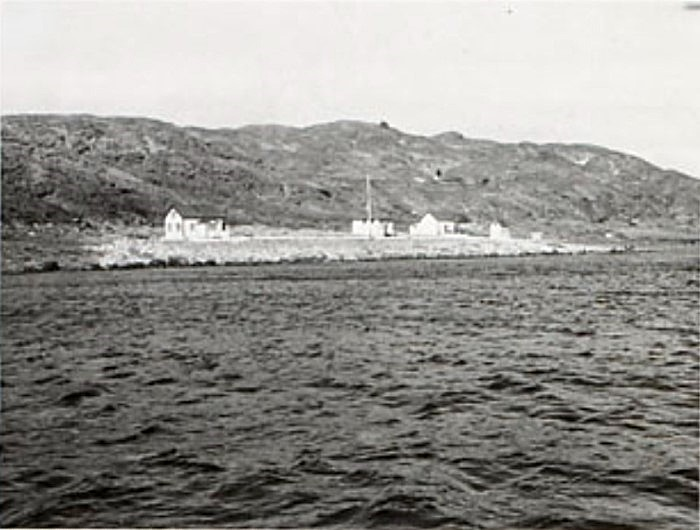
Hudson's Bay Co. post on Smith Island, 1945

Circa 1178 (772 cal. a BP.), the Dorset people made semi-subterranean winter houses of rock and peat on the island. The Thule people reused this site about a century later, after the Dorset people had left.

In 1610, Henry Hudson was the first European explorer into the bay named after him, passing by Smith Island while sailing south along the bay’s eastern coast.

In 1922, the Hudson's Bay Company established a fur trade post at what is known today as Akulivik, but moved it to Smith Island in 1926. Some Inuit began to settle around the post, called Cape Smith or Suglouvoosiuk-Noova Hikikriguak by its Inuit name, while the Akulivik area was used as a summer camp. By 1933, there were about 140 Inuit living on Smith Island. In July 1952, the post was closed and the Inuit relocated to Puvirnituq.
