= Drybones Bay kimberlite pipe =

The Drybones Bay kimberlite pipe is a diamondiferous diatreme in the Slave craton of the Northwest Territories, Canada. It is the largest diatreme discovered in the Northwest Territories.

== See also ==
- Volcanology of Canada
- Volcanology of Northern Canada
