= Uchi Subprovince =

Volcanic sequence in Manitoba, Canada

Coordinates: 50.729°N 95.460°W

The Uchi Subprovince is a Neoarchean volcanic sequence in Manitoba, Canada.

== See also ==
- Volcanism of Canada
- Volcanism of Western Canada
