= Nipissing sills =

Coordinates: 47°24′N 79°41′W

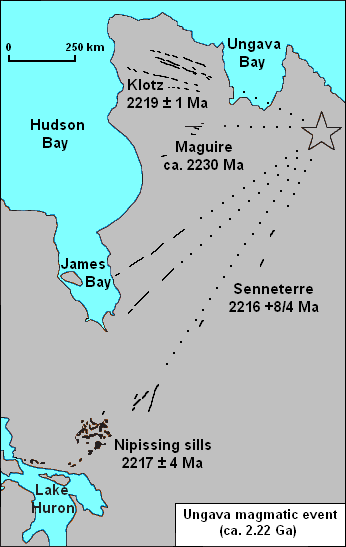
Nipissing sills associated with Ungava magmatic event

The Nipissing sills, also called the Nipissing diabase, is a large 2217– to 2210–million year old group of sills in the Superior craton of the Canadian Shield in Ontario, Canada, which intrude the Huronian Supergroup. Nipissing sills intrude all the Huronian sediments and older basement rocks in the northern margin of the Sudbury Basin; they were emplaced after the faulting and folding of Huronian rocks, and are hornblende gabbro of tholeiitic basalt composition. In the Sudbury–Elliot Lake area the Nipissing diabase is deformed; outcrops are parallel to the fold axes of the Huronian sedimentary rocks. Nipissing diabase intrusions are east-northeast trending and are no wider than 460 m (1,510 ft).

The Nipissing sills in the Southern Province of the Superior craton are thought to originate from a radiating dike swarm area 1,300 km (810 mi) to the northeast. The mantle source for the Nipissing sills did not come from the mantle beneath the Southern Province that had generated the 2500– to 2450–million year old Matachewan dike swarm. The 2217– to 2210–million year old Ungava magmatic event – located under the Labrador Trough – fed the Nipissing sills; evidence shows the sills were laterally fed from a mantle plume center 1,500 km (930 mi) away via the 2216–million year old Senneterre dikes which form part of the radiating dike swarm.

In 1911, Willett G. Miller named the Nipissing diabase type area at Cobalt, Ontario.

== See also ==
- Volcanism of Eastern Canada
