= Ungava magmatic event =

Coordinates: 57.381°N 68.826°W

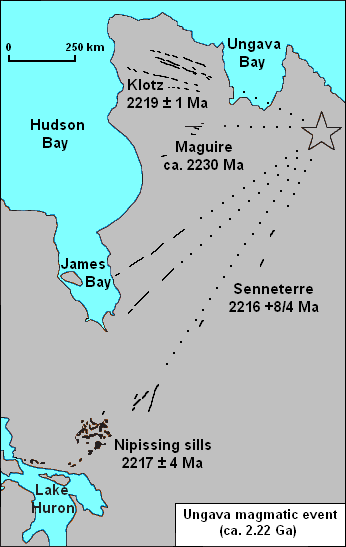
Map of features associated with the Ungava magmatic event

The Ungava magmatic event was a widespread magmatic event that began about 2.22 billion years ago during the Proterozoic Eon.

== Extent ==
With an area of 170,000 km^{2} (66,000 sq mi), the Ungava magmatic event caused the formation of a large igneous province. Magmatic features that were formed during the Ungava magmatic event include the Klotz, Maguire and Senneterre dikes of Quebec and the Nipissing sills of Ontario.
