= Cape Smith Belt =

The Cape Smith Belt is an early Proterozoic thrust belt in northern Quebec, Canada. It is an integral part of the Circum-Superior Belt, which runs across the Ungava Peninsula. Cape Smith on Smith Island is its western-most exposed point.
