= Wrangell Volcanic Belt =

The Wrangell Volcanic Belt is a volcanic belt in the U.S. state of Alaska, the Canadian territory of Yukon and the Canadian province of British Columbia. It includes five volcanic fields that range in age from 26 million to 1,500 years old. The largest and northwesternmost is the Wrangell volcanic field in the Wrangell Mountains of southern Alaska. It consists of calc-alkaline lavas that range in age from 26 million years old at the Rocker Creek eruptive centre near the Alaska–Yukon border to about 200,000 years old at Mount Drum in the northwest. The White River Ash was deposited by two large explosive eruptions from the Bona-Churchill massif in the Saint Elias Mountains 1,850 and 1,290 years ago.

Near the Alaska–Yukon border in southwestern Yukon, the St. Clare Creek volcanic field is the product of alkaline to calc-alkaline volcanism that mainly issued from two large eruptive centres 18–10 million years ago. The Nines Creek volcanic field to the east-southeast in southwestern Yukon consists of 15.5–13 million-year-old transitional lavas. To the southeast, also in southwestern Yukon, the Alsek volcanic field is the product of calc-alkaline and minor transitional and alkaline volcanism that occurred near the British Columbia–Yukon border 13.5–10.8 million years ago. The Stanley Creek volcanic field in northern British Columbia near the Yukon border is the smallest and southernmost volcanic field in the Wrangell Volcanic Belt. It consists of transitional and minor alkaline lavas that remain undated.

Volcanism in the northwestern portion of the Wrangell Volcanic Belt is related to subduction of the Yakutat terrane. In contrast, volcanism in the southeastern portion of the belt was related to both subduction processes and extension along the Duke River fault. The differing tectonic settings in each portion resulted in the eruption of distinct lavas; the northwestern portion in Alaska consists of calc-alkaline lavas whereas the southeastern portion in Yukon and British Columbia is dominated by transitional lavas with smaller amounts of calc-alkaline and alkaline lavas. The Wrangell Volcanic Belt lies between the Border Ranges and Denali faults with the exception of the Stanley Creek volcanic field, which is east of the Denali fault.
