= Phoenix pipe =

Diatreme in Canada

The Phoenix pipe is a diatreme associated with the Birch Mountains kimberlite field in northern Alberta, Canada. It is thought to have formed about 75 million years ago when this part of Alberta was volcanically active during the Late Cretaceous period.

== See also ==
- Volcanism of Western Canada
- List of volcanoes in Canada
