= Legend pipe =

Diatreme in Canada

The Legend pipe is a diatreme associated with the Birch Mountains kimberlite field in northern Alberta, Canada. It is thought to have formed about 75 million years ago during the Late Cretaceous period.

== See also ==
- Volcanism of Western Canada
- List of volcanoes in Canada
