= Birch Mountains kimberlite field =

Cluster of volcanic pipes in Canada

Coordinates: 57.0722°N 115.4069°W

Location of the Birch Mountains Kimberlite Field in Northern Alberta, Canada.

The Birch Mountains kimberlite field is a cluster of kimberlitic volcanic pipes or diatremes in north-central Alberta, Canada that were emplaced during a period of kimberlitic volcanism in the Late Cretaceous epoch. As of 2011, 8 diatremes had been discovered in the field, and diamonds and microdiamononds had been recovered during sampling programs.

== Location and geological setting ==
The Birch Mountain (BM) kimberlite field was discovered in 1998 and lies about 430 km (270 mi) north of Edmonton and 135 km (84 mi) northwest of Fort McMurray. It is part of the Northern Alberta kimberlite province, along with the Buffalo Head Hills kimberlite field and the Mountain Lake cluster.

The BM diatremes are hosted in the marine shales and silty shales of the Late Cretaceous Smoky or La Biche Group, and they are thought to have been erupted in an open marine to near shore marine setting in the Western Interior Seaway. Unconsolidated Quaternary sediments that reach thicknesses of more than 150 m (490 ft) now cover the bedrock in the area, so the diatremes were located primarily by aeromagnetic surveys followed by drilling.

== Age ==
According to radiometric dating the BM diatremes were emplaced about 70 to 78 million years ago during the Campanian to Maastrichtian stages of the Late Cretaceous epoch. Microfossils from shales interbedded with kimberlite at some of the diatremes are consistent with a Late Cretaceous age (Late Albian to Maastrichtian).

== Lithology and mineralogy ==
The volcanic rocks of the BM field consist primarily of crater-facies pyroclastic kimberlite and resedimented kimberlite. They include massive layers, as well as bedded and graded layers of coarse lapilli alternating with layers of finer tuff. Lapilli and olivine phenocrysts are set in a grey-green matrix of serpentine, carbonate minerals (calcite, dolomite, and magnesite) and clay minerals. Phlogopite, oxide minerals (ilmenite, perovskite and spinel), apatite and pyrite are also present. Diamonds and microdiamonds have been recovered from samples taken from the Phoenix and Legend pipes.

== List of diatremes ==
The diatremes within the field include:

- Phoenix pipe
- Dragon pipe
- Xena pipe
- Legend pipe
- Valkyrie pipe
- Kendu pipe
- Roc pipe
- Pegasus pipe

== See also ==
- Volcanism of Western Canada
- List of volcanoes in Canada
- List of volcanic fields
