= Valkyrie pipe =

Diatreme in northern Alberta, Canada

The Valkyrie pipe is a diatreme in northern Alberta, Canada. It is associated with a group of diatremes called the Birch Mountains kimberlite field which is thought to have formed about 75 million years ago when this part of Alberta was volcanically active during the Late Cretaceous period.

== See also ==
- Volcanology of Western Canada
- List of volcanoes in Canada
