= Labrador Trough =

Geological formation in Canada

Coordinates: 56.0°N 67.5°W

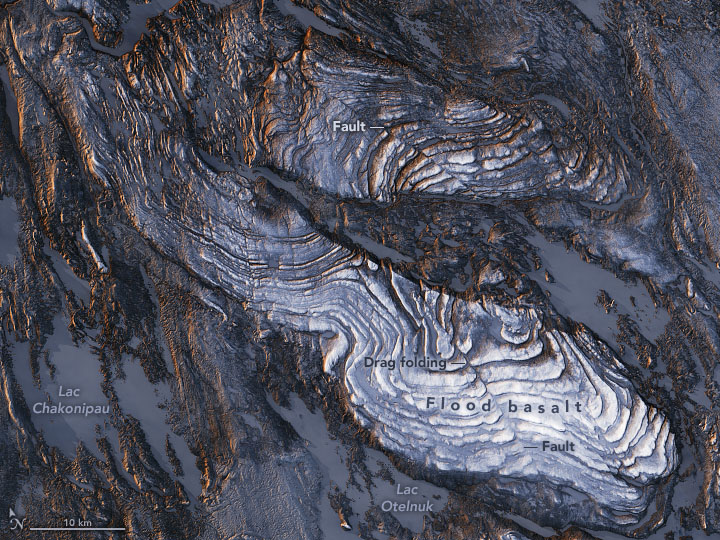
Spectacular fold patterns in flood basalts, New Quebec Orogen, NE Quebec. See the image file for details of the local geology.

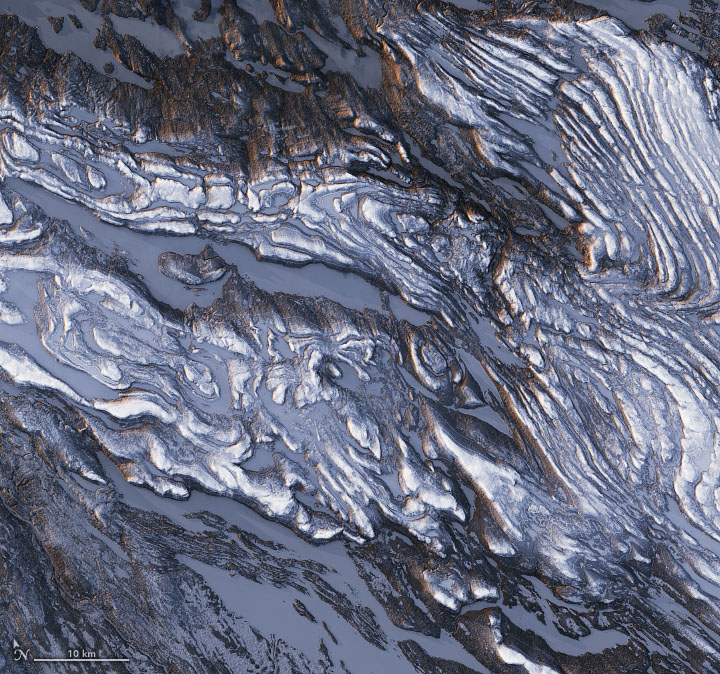
Detail of an area just SE of the image above. Both images are a few km NE of the Caniapiscau River.

The Labrador Trough or the New Quebec Orogen is a 1,600 km (994 mi) long and 160 km (99 mi) wide geologic belt in Canada, extending south-southeast from Ungava Bay through Quebec and Labrador.

The trough is a linear belt of sedimentary and volcanic rocks which developed in an Early Proterozoic rift basin. To the west is the Archean Superior Craton. To the east are the rocks of the Archean Rae Craton. The sedimentary rocks and volcanics of the Labrador Trough were intensely deformed and subjected to high grade metamorphism along with the Churchill terrain during the Trans-Hudson orogeny. It is a northeast extension of the Circum-Superior Belt and is terminated to the south by the Grenville Front Tectonic Zone.

Radiometric dates of 1883-1870 Ma are reported for mafic, ultramafic, carbonatite and lamprophyre intrusions within the Trough.

It is a large iron ore belt developed on banded iron formations and has had mining operations since 1954.

At least two large magmatic events occurred in the Labrador Trough. The first event 2,170 million years ago engulfed an area of 30,000 km^{2} (12,000 sq mi) and the second 1,880 million years ago covered a similar area of 30,000 km^{2} (12,000 sq mi).

== Geological history ==
The geological history of the Labrador Trough spans several tens of millions of years ranging from around 2.2 Ga to 1.74 Ga:

1. Following rifting along the Archean margin of the Superior craton about 2.2 billion years ago, rocks of the western part of the Labrador Trough were deposited. This period corresponds to the onset of first-cycle sedimentation and is characterized by the deposition of immature sediments, slightly alkaline volcanics, and the intrusion of mafic dykes.
2. Deposition of passive margin sediments, MORB-like mafic volcanism and intrusion of mafic sills characterize most of the first cycle between approximately 2.17 and 2.14 Ga. The end of the cycle (<2.06 Ga) is marked by the deposition of dolomite and chert on a restored platform.
3. Second-cycle platform and basin sedimentation occurred from 1.88 to 1.87 Ga and is associated with a new rifting episode or development of a fore-trough basin. This period is characterized by the intrusion of mafic-ultramafic sills, meimechite and carbonatite deposition, and MORB-like mafic volcanism corresponding to the formation of a transitional continental-oceanic crust.
4. A deformation and high-grade metamorphism phase occurs in the hinterland near Kuujjuaq from 1.84 to 1.83 Ga. A regional-scale granitic and charnockitic intrusion, the De Pas Supersuite (formerly De Pas Batholith), was also emplaced during the same period and up to 1.81 Ga. This supersuite is interpreted by several authors as being associated with a Proterozoic magmatic arc environment connected to a subduction zone developed during the orogenesis. This supersuite may also be associated with a syncollisional component in the hinterland.
5. There would have been an oblique collision between the Superior craton and the Core Zone of the Churchill Province during the orogenesis from 1.82 to 1.77 Ga. This event resulted in transpressure-type deformation and the formation of a western-verging thrust and fold belt, now known as the Labrador Trough. Molasse-type sediments were deposited on the Superior Province margin in the third cycle during this period.
6. Undeformed and likely post-tectonic small intrusions of monzonite occurred in the Labrador Trough around 1.81 Ga.
7. The hinterland near Kuujjuaq is characterized by pegmatite intrusion and hydrothermal activity followed by a cooling period from 1.77 to 1.74 Ga.

== See also ==
- Volcanism of Eastern Canada
- Trans-Hudson orogeny
