= Fox River Belt =

Paleoproterozoic geologic feature located in northern Manitoba, Canada

The Fox River Belt is a 300 km (186 mi) long and 10 km (6 mi) to 30 km (19 mi) wide Paleoproterozoic geologic feature located in northern Manitoba, Canada. It consists of sedimentary and mafic/ultramafic igneous rocks.
