= Thompson Belt =

Archean and early Proterozoic geologic feature in Manitoba, Canada

The Thompson Belt, also referred to as the Thompson Nickel Belt, is an Archean and early Proterozoic geologic feature in Manitoba, Canada. It contains gneiss related to deformation of the Trans-Hudson orogeny.
