= The Volcano (British Columbia) =

Mountain in British Columbia, Canada

- Lava Fork volcano
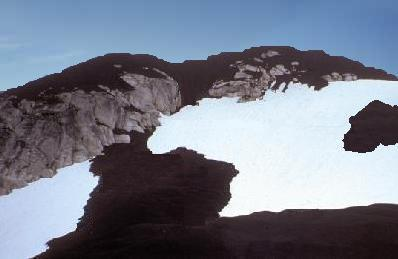
- The Volcano with thick black scoria in the foreground

Highest point
- Elevation: 1,656 m (5,433 ft)
- Prominence: 311 m (1,020 ft)
- Listing: Volcanoes in Canada; Mountains of British Columbia
- Coordinates: 56°25′22″N 130°51′00″W

Geography
- Location along the British Columbia–Alaska border
- Location in Lava Forks Provincial Park
- Country: Canada
- Province: British Columbia
- District: Cassiar Land District
- Parent range: Boundary Ranges (Coast Mountains)
- Topo map: NTS 104B7 Unuk River

Geology
- Mountain type: Cinder cone
- Volcanic zone: Northern Cordilleran Province
- Volcanic field: Iskut volcanic field
- Last eruption: 1800 (?)

The Volcano, also known as Lava Fork volcano, is a small cinder cone in the Boundary Ranges of the Coast Mountains in northwestern British Columbia, Canada. It is located approximately 60 kilometres (40 miles) northwest of the small community of Stewart near the head of Lava Fork. With an elevation of 1,656 metres (5,433 feet) and a topographic prominence of 311 m (1,020 ft), it rises above the surrounding rugged landscape on a remote mountain ridge that represents the northern flank of a glaciated U-shaped valley.

Lava Fork volcano is associated with a small group of volcanoes called the Iskut volcanic field. This forms part of the much larger Northern Cordilleran Volcanic Province, which extends from the Alaska–Yukon border to near the port city of Prince Rupert, British Columbia. Eruptive activity at The Volcano is relatively young compared to most other volcanoes in the Northern Cordilleran Volcanic Province. Geologic studies have shown that The Volcano and its eruptive products were emplaced in the last 400 years; this is well after the last glacial period, which ended about 10,000 years ago.

== Geology ==
The Volcano is the southernmost of ten volcanoes comprising the Iskut volcanic field, as well as the most recent to erupt. Its structure is poorly formed and has been reduced by erosion from alpine glacial ice found at its elevation and latitude. It represents one of the few historically active volcanoes in the Northern Cordilleran Volcanic Province, with a base elevation estimated to be 100 m (330 ft). Like most cinder cones, The Volcano consists of a pile of loose volcanic ash, lapilli-sized tephra and volcanic bombs. These were deposited during periods of lava fountain activity. The vent area contains volcanic bombs up to 0.5 m (1.6 ft) long and small deposits of sulfur precipitated from volcanic gases.

Like other Iskut-Unuk River Cones, The Volcano has its origins in continental rifting—a long rupture in the Earth's crust where the lithosphere is being pulled apart. This incipient rifting has formed as a result of the Pacific Plate sliding northward along the Queen Charlotte Fault, on its way to the Aleutian Trench. As the continental crust stretches, the near surface rocks fracture along steeply dipping cracks parallel to the rift known as faults. Basaltic magma rises along these fractures to create effusive eruptions. The rift zone has existed for at least 14.9 million years, and has created the Northern Cordilleran Volcanic Province. Several dormant volcanoes in the province are potentially active, with The Volcano being one of the three having erupted in the last few hundred years. Tseax Cone, which last erupted in the 18th century, is the southernmost volcano in the province, whereas Prindle Volcano in easternmost-central Alaska, which last erupted more than 10,000 years ago, is generally considered the northernmost.

=== Volcanic history ===
At least two phases of volcanic activity have been identified at The Volcano. Each event was followed by the eruption of lengthy basaltic lava flows that flowed down steep granitic flanks of the mountain ridge on which The Volcano lies. After this took place, they travelled through the Lava Fork valley for 5 km (3 mi). Here, the flows crossed the British Columbia border into the U.S. state of Alaska and blocked the Blue River, a tributary of the Unuk River, forming several lakes. The lava flows in total are about 22 km (14 mi) long and still contain their original features from when they cooled, including pressure ridges and lava channels. A series of large trees were engulfed by the lava flows during eruption. The bases of the trees burned and the upper trunks and branches collapsed into the solidifying lava, leaving the trees embedded on the surface of the lava flows. After the flows solidified, tree molds and lava tubes collapsed to form volcanic pits. At the southern end of one of the lava flows, it spreads into a broad terminal lobe on the flat alluvial plain of the Unuk River. Volcanic ash and lava from The Volcano still linger on small glaciers near Mount Lewis Cass, a 2,094 m (6,870 ft) high mountain near the Alaska–British Columbia border.

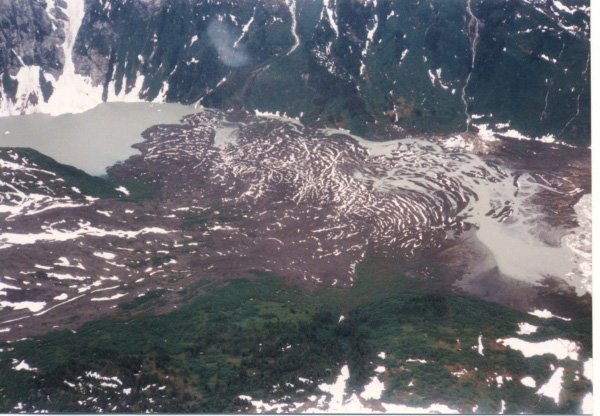
A recently erupted pāhoehoe lava flow extending down the vegetated flanks of a mountain ridge. The alpine lake in the upper left corner is the southern lake of the two Lava Lakes.

At least one lava flow from The Volcano was notified by a surveyor named Fremont Morse in 1905 during a survey for the International Boundary Commission. In 1906, Morse wrote that the most recently erupted lava flow had "probably occurred within less than fifty years". Since Morse's report, tree ring and radiocarbon dating techniques have been used to establish the dates of The Volcano's two volcanic phases. The first is estimated to have occurred about 360 years ago and the latest possibly took place only 150 years ago. This indicates that The Volcano is the youngest known volcanic mountain in Canada and that its volcanic activity is recent compared to many other volcanoes in British Columbia. In several documents, the last eruption of The Volcano is written to have occurred in 1904. However, according to the Smithsonian Institution's Global Volcanism Program, this eruption is considered uncertain.

Although The Volcano is estimated to have last erupted 150 years ago, it is one of the five volcanoes in the Northern Cordilleran Volcanic Province that have recorded seismicity since 1985. Others include Castle Rock (two events), Hoodoo Mountain (eight events), Crow Lagoon (four events) and the Mount Edziza volcanic complex (eight events). Seismic data suggest that these volcanoes still contain active magma chambers, indicating that some Northern Cordilleran volcanoes are probably active, with significant potential hazards. The seismic activity corresponds both with some of Canada's recently formed volcanoes and with persistent volcanoes that have had major explosive activity throughout their history, such as Hoodoo Mountain and the Mount Edziza volcanic complex.

== Human history ==
=== Naming controversy ===
The name of the peak was suggested by an explorer named Chris Dickinson during the Cambridge Coast Mountains Expedition in 1979. It was adopted on November 24, 1980, and has been its official name since then. However, this name for the peak does not normally show up in any volcanological resources. Instead, it is informally referred to as Lava Fork or Lava Fork volcano due to its close association with the creek of the same name. The reason for this controversy is because The Volcano is generic. In speech it may not be obvious whether The Volcano or the volcano is intended, leading to confusion. Similar named volcanoes in Canada include Volcano Vent in the Tuya volcanic field of northwestern British Columbia and Volcano Mountain in the Fort Selkirk volcanic field of central Yukon. As of 2009, the unofficial terms for The Volcano continue to be used by Natural Resources Canada.

=== Protection and monitoring ===
The Volcano, its eruptive products and a large mineral spring are protected in Lava Forks Provincial Park. Founded in 2001 as a Class A provincial park, this highly remote park covers an area of 7,000 ha (17,000 acres). Lying within its boundaries are the Lava Lakes, two lakes dammed by lava flows erupted from The Volcano. Located in asserted traditional territory of the Tahltan First Nation, Lava Forks Provincial Park provides a location to study ecological processes associated with primary succession or the establishment of vegetation after a major disturbance. After 150 years of non-eruptive activity, vegetation has grown on the surface of the lava flows, including mosses and lichens. Western Hemlock, Mountain Hemlock and Alpine tundra biogeoclimatic subzones also occur in the area, which form part of the Boundary Ranges Ecosection.

Like other Iskut-Unuk River Cones, The Volcano is not monitored closely enough by the Geological Survey of Canada to ascertain its activity level. The Canadian National Seismograph Network has been established to monitor earthquakes throughout Canada, but it is too far away to provide an accurate indication of activity under the mountain. The seismograph network may sense an increase in seismic activity if The Volcano becomes highly restless, but this may only provide a warning for a large eruption; the system might detect activity only once the mountain has started erupting. If The Volcano were to erupt, mechanisms exist to orchestrate relief efforts. The Interagency Volcanic Event Notification Plan was created to outline the notification procedure of some of the main agencies that would respond to an erupting volcano in Canada, an eruption close to the Canada–United States border or any eruption that would affect Canada.

== Volcanic hazards ==
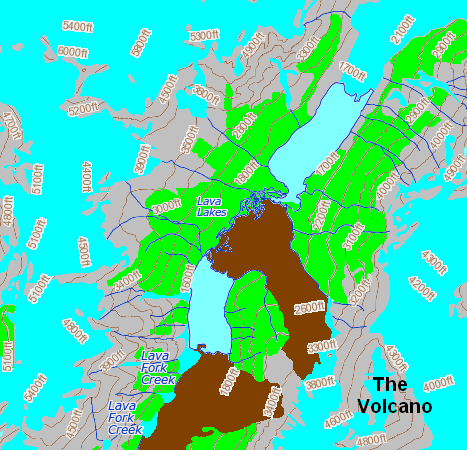
Topographic map of The Volcano and the surrounding landscape. Dark blue lines are creeks, moderate blue areas are glaciers, light blue patches are the Lava Lakes, green zones are vegetated areas and brown areas are lava flows erupted from The Volcano.

At least seven eruptions have occurred in the Iskut-Unuk River volcanic field in the last 10,000 years. Since around 1600, all eruptions have occurred from The Volcano, which has a total eruption volume of 2.2 km^{3} (0.53 mi^{3}). Future eruptions from The Volcano will probably be similar in character to those that have occurred throughout its 360-year eruptive history. There is a one in 200 chance per year of an eruption occurring in Canada and one in 220 chance per year of an effusive eruption. An eruption in the foreseeable future is probably more likely along the Northern Cordilleran Volcanic Province than in an unrelated volcanic zone outside the province. This is because the Northern Cordilleran Volcanic Province, which includes the Iskut-Unuk River Cones, is the most active volcanic zone in Canada.

=== Effects ===
A small range of effects are expected from future eruptions at The Volcano. Its remote uninhabited location makes volcanic hazards less extreme and is therefore not very hazardous. Ash and rock fragments (tephra) ejected during lava fountain activity are unlikely to be high enough to disrupt regional air traffic. However, they could possibly endanger lower flying aircraft along the northern coastal corridor between Vancouver and Alaska. The closest major air route is about 170 km (110 mi) to the east. Volcanic ash reduces visibility and can cause jet engine failure, as well as damage to other aircraft systems.

Lava flows emitted during future volcanic eruptions would likely be basaltic in nature based on the composition of its lavas produced during past volcanic activity. Basaltic lava flows are low in silica content and can spread rapidly and move quickly downslope. The last eruption at The Volcano 150 years ago had a large impact on fish, plant and animal inhabitants in the valley the lava flows travelled through to cross the Canada–United States border. Because of these circumstances, future eruptions may again block the flow of local water courses if the volume of the erupted lavas are significant enough. This would again have disastrous consequences for fish habitats and spawning grounds. However, there are neither records of any impacts on people during this eruption, nor evidence that it was even witnessed by people. A repeat of wildfires in the Lava Fork valley is also a possibility due to the existence of vegetation on and around the erupted lavas.

== See also ==
- Cinder Mountain
- Cone Glacier Volcano
- Iskut Canyon Cone
- King Creek Cone
- List of cinder cones
- List of Northern Cordilleran volcanoes
- Second Canyon Cone
- Snippaker Creek Cone
- Tom MacKay Creek Cone
- Volcanism of Western Canada
