= Hoodoo Mountain =

Stratovolcano in British Columbia, Canada

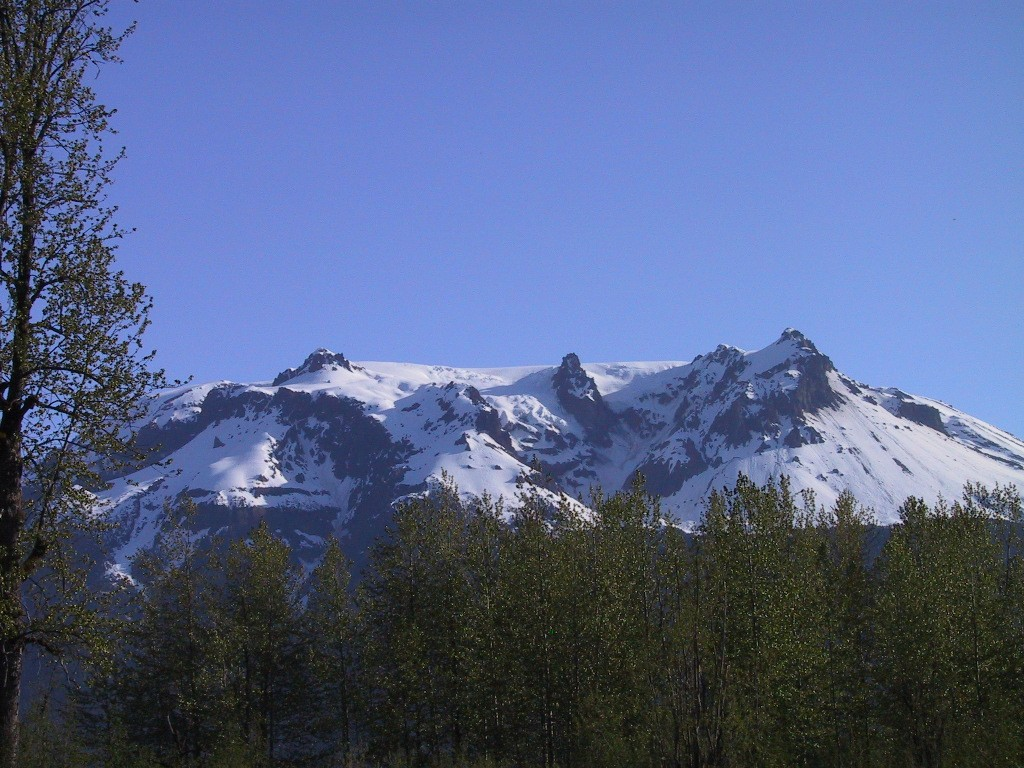
- Hoodoo Mountain as seen from the Iskut River

Highest point
- Elevation: 1,850 m (6,070 ft)
- Prominence: 900 m (3,000 ft)
- Listing: Mountains of British Columbia
- Coordinates: 56°46′18″N 131°17′46″W

Dimensions
- Length: 6 km (3.7 mi)
- Width: 6 km (3.7 mi)
- Volume: 17.3 km^{3} (4.2 mi^{3})

Geography
- Location in British Columbia
- Location along the Iskut River
- Country: Canada
- Province: British Columbia
- District: Cassiar Land District
- Parent range: Boundary Ranges
- Topo map: NTS 104B14 Hoodoo Mountain

Geology
- Rock age: Less than 85,000 years old
- Mountain type: Stratovolcano
- Rock type(s): Phonolite and trachyte
- Volcanic zone: Northern Cordilleran Province
- Last eruption: 7050 BCE (?)

Hoodoo Mountain, sometimes referred to as Hoodoo Volcano, is a potentially active stratovolcano in the Northern Interior of British Columbia, Canada. It is located 25 kilometres (16 miles) northeast of the Alaska–British Columbia border on the north side of the Iskut River opposite of the mouth of the Craig River. With a summit elevation of 1,850 metres (6,070 feet) and a topographic prominence of 900 m (3,000 ft), Hoodoo Mountain is one of many prominent peaks within the Boundary Ranges of the Coast Mountains. Its flat-topped summit is covered by an ice cap more than 100 m (330 ft) thick and at least 3 km (1.9 mi) in diameter. Two valley glaciers surrounding the northwestern and northeastern sides of the mountain have retreated significantly over the last hundred years. They both originate from a large icefield to the north and are the sources of two meltwater streams. These streams flow along the western and eastern sides of the volcano before draining into the Iskut River.

Much of Hoodoo Mountain was formed beneath glacial ice and it has been overlain by glaciers or an ice cap throughout much of its history. The main rock types composing the volcano are phonolite and trachyte, which were deposited during six periods of eruptive activity beginning about 85,000 years ago. Most of these eruptive periods were characterized by steady flows of lava, but at least one period of explosive activity occurred as indicated by the presence of pyroclastic rocks. The latest eruptive period began about 10,000 years ago with the eruption of extensive lava flows that cover the north–central, northwestern and southeastern mountain slopes. A lava flow covering the southwestern slope may have been produced by a more recent eruption within the last couple of hundred years. Although no historical eruptions are known at Hoodoo Mountain, there have been periods of seismic activity since at least the mid-1980s, indicating possible future eruptions and volcanic hazards.

Hoodoo Mountain lies in a remote area of Cassiar Land District that has undergone mineral exploration since at least the early 1900s. This exploration led to the discovery of copper, silver and gold within the Iskut River floodplain where two underground mines operated between 1988 and 1999. Geological studies have been conducted at Hoodoo Mountain since at least the 1940s; the most detailed studies occurred in the 1990s and 2000s. The area has a mostly cool and wet climate with heavy precipitation. As a result, a limited number of mammals live around Hoodoo Mountain. Trees of the pine and willow families form forests in the regional river valleys and on the lower slopes of the volcano. They compose one of many ecoregions that occur throughout British Columbia. Due to its remoteness, Hoodoo Mountain can only be accessed by air, by water or by trekking great distances on foot. The closest communities are more than 30 km (19 mi) away from the mountain.

== Geography ==
=== Biogeography ===
Hoodoo Mountain lies within the Boundary Ranges Ecoregion, a mountainous region of the Coast Mountains in southeastern Alaska and northwestern British Columbia characterized by rugged, largely ice-capped mountains of granitic and metamorphic rocks. Mountain hemlock, western hemlock and Sitka spruce form forests on valley bottoms and lower valley slopes. They are overlooked by an extensive alpine tundra zone consisting primarily of large icefields, glaciers and barren rock. Several large river valleys with wide braided channels penetrate the Boundary Ranges Ecoregion; black cottonwood occur on their floodplains. A limited number of mammal species thrive in this ecoregion, such as hoary marmots and mountain goats, which inhabit the alpine tundra zone. The Boundary Ranges Ecoregion is part of the Coast and Mountains Ecoprovince which forms part of the Humid Maritime and Highlands Ecodivision.

The Boundary Ranges Ecoregion is subdivided into three ecosections, the Southern Boundary Ranges Ecosection being the main ecosection at Hoodoo Mountain. This ecosection is cut by several streams, including the Salmon, Bear and Unuk rivers, which drain directly into marine channels or sounds. The only settlements in the Southern Boundary Ranges Ecosection are Kincolith, Stewart and Hyder, the latter two of which are connected by the Stewart Highway. There is no human population within 30 km (19 mi) of Hoodoo Mountain, but 2,330 people live within 100 km (62 mi). Forests of this ecosection grow on the lower slopes of Hoodoo Mountain except for its northeastern flank where rock and ice are dominant. Much of this forest cover lies at elevations below 900 m (3,000 ft).

=== Climate ===
Hoodoo Mountain has a maritime glacial climate that is intermediate between fully coastal maritime and continental climates. Moist air from the Pacific Ocean brings intense precipitation over the region while simultaneously allowing cold Arctic air to pass down through the Portland Canal into the Dixon Entrance where it flows into British Columbia's North Coast. Therefore, the regional climate is mostly cool and wet with snowpacks and heavy precipitation. About 500 millimetres (20 inches) of precipitation falls during the summer months of June, July and August whereas up to 1,300 mm (51 in) of precipitation can be expected during the winter months of December, January and February. In summer the average temperature is 6.9 degrees Celsius (44.4 degrees Fahrenheit) whereas the average winter temperature sits at −6.4 degrees Celsius (20.5 degrees Fahrenheit). The annual average temperature is −0.8 degrees Celsius (30.6 degrees Fahrenheit).

=== Glaciers ===
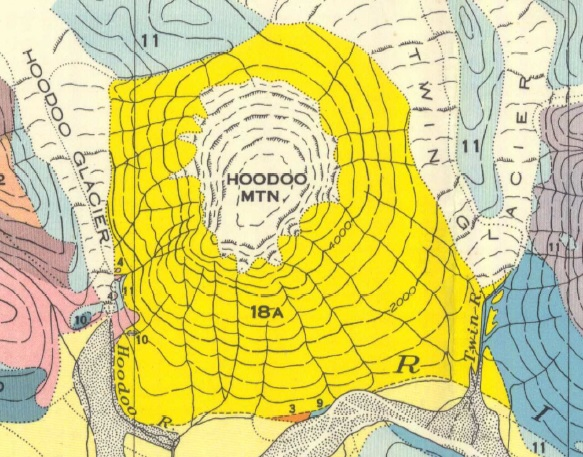
Topographic map produced from data collected in the late 1920s

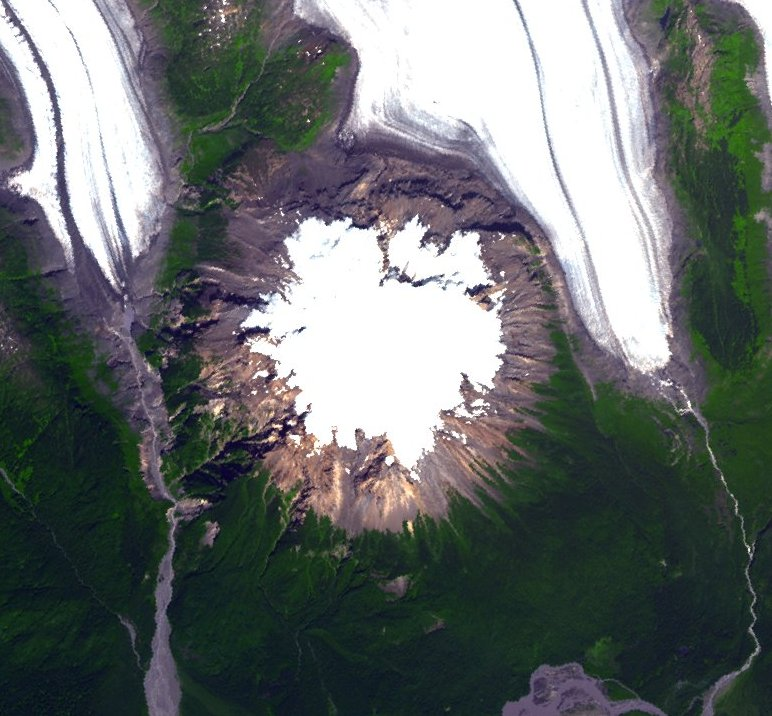
Hoodoo Mountain and its ice cap and two valley glaciers in 2008

Two valley glaciers wrap partially around the base of Hoodoo Mountain, both of which are actively retreating. Hoodoo Glacier surrounding its northwestern base is the source of the Hoodoo River which flows south into the Iskut River. It has lost about 100 m (330 ft) of its total thickness over the last 700 years and its terminus has retreated at least 2 km (1.2 mi) since the 1920s. At the terminus of Hoodoo Glacier is a roughly 350 m (1,150 ft) long and 100 m (330 ft) wide lake which may occupy a previously drained depression. The western side of the glacier contains a small possibly drained ice-marginal lake. Twin Glacier surrounds the northwestern base of Hoodoo Mountain and is the largest of the two valley glaciers. It is the source of the Twin River which also flows south into the Iskut River. Several changes have taken place at this double-lobed glacier since the 1920s. Its terminus has retreated about 4 km (2.5 mi), having formerly flowed around both sides of a north–south trending ridge. A small moraine-dammed lake lies along the southwestern margin of Twin Glacier.

The Hoodoo and Twin glaciers are separated by a ridgeline extending north of Hoodoo Mountain. They have cut deep valleys into the older regional bedrock and have interacted with Hoodoo Mountain intermittently since the Pleistocene. Both glaciers originate from the Andrei Icefield centered 16 km (9.9 mi) northeast of Hoodoo Mountain. This large glacial field is informally named after the son of Olav Mokievsky-Zubok, a glaciologist who carried out significant glaciological work in the Coast Mountains from the 1960s to the 1970s.

The summit of Hoodoo Mountain contains an ice cap that persists at elevations greater than 1,600 m (5,200 ft). It varies from 100 to 150 m (330 to 490 ft) thick and has a diameter of 3–4 km (1.9–2.5 mi), attaining a minimum volume of 3.2 km^{3} (0.77 mi^{3}). Its circular shape and higher elevation have made it relatively stable to climate change, having undergone minor retreat and thinning only at its very edges. It therefore maintains at least partial snow cover during all months of the year. At the north–central end of the ice cap lies a prominent nunatak called The Horn or Horn Nunatak which consists of pyroclastic rock surrounding a core of lava.

== Geology ==
=== Background ===
Hoodoo Mountain is part of the Northern Cordilleran Volcanic Province (NCVP), a broad area of shield volcanoes, lava domes, cinder cones and stratovolcanoes extending from northwestern British Columbia northwards through Yukon into easternmost Alaska. The dominant rocks that make up these volcanoes are alkali basalts and hawaiites, but nephelinites, basanites and peralkaline (Note: Peralkaline rocks are magmatic rocks that have a higher ratio of sodium and potassium to aluminum.) phonolites, trachytes and comendites are locally abundant. These rocks were deposited by volcanic eruptions from 20 million years ago to as recently as a few hundred years ago. Volcanism in the Northern Cordilleran Volcanic Province is thought to be due to rifting of the North American Cordillera, driven by changes in relative plate motion between the North American and Pacific plates.

Hoodoo Mountain is part of a subdivision of the NCVP called the Stikine Subprovince. This subprovince, confined to the Stikine region of northwestern British Columbia, includes three other volcanic centres: Heart Peaks, Level Mountain and Mount Edziza. The four volcanic centres differ petrologically and/or volumetrically from the rest of the NCVP. Heart Peaks, Level Mountain and Mount Edziza are the largest NCVP centres by volume, the latter two of which have experienced volcanism for a much longer timespan than any other NCVP centre. Hoodoo Mountain, Level Mountain and Mount Edziza are the only NCVP centres that contain volcanic rocks of both mafic (Note: Mafic pertains to magmatic rocks that are relatively rich in iron and magnesium, relative to silicon.) and intermediate to felsic (Note: Felsic pertains to magmatic rocks that are enriched with silicon, oxygen, aluminum, sodium and potassium.) composition. The highest of the four complexes is Mount Edziza at 2,786 m (9,140 ft), followed by Level Mountain at 2,164 m (7,100 ft), Heart Peaks at 2,012 m (6,601 ft) and Hoodoo Mountain at 1,850 m (6,070 ft).

Hoodoo Mountain is one of ten volcanoes composing the Iskut volcanic field. This is a group of NCVP volcanoes scattered along the Iskut River and its main tributaries. They consist of both subaerial and glaciovolcanic deposits, the latter of which are in the form of pillow lavas, tuff breccias (Note: Breccia is a rock consisting of angular fragments fused together.) and hyaloclastite. All of these volcanoes were active in the last 150,000 years; the latest eruption occurred from The Volcano about 150 years ago. The remaining Iskut volcanoes are Cinder Mountain, Little Bear Mountain and the Cone Glacier, Iskut Canyon, Second Canyon, Snippaker Creek, King Creek and Tom MacKay Creek cones.

=== Structure ===
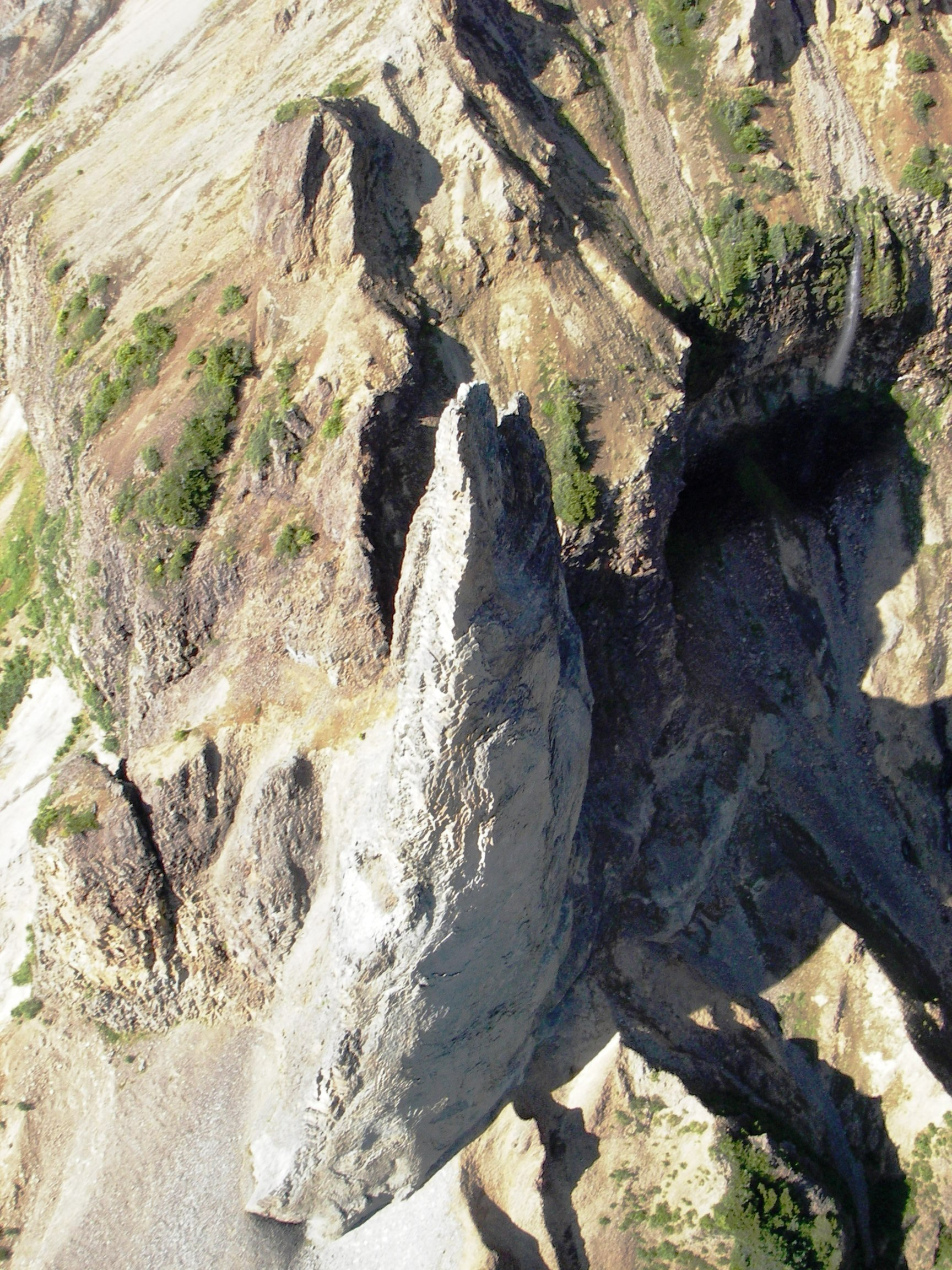
The Monument is one of several hoodoos that have given Hoodoo Mountain its name.

Hoodoo Mountain is one of the largest peralkaline volcanoes in the NCVP. It is a stratovolcano composed primarily of peralkaline phonolite and trachyte lava flows and hyaloclastites, although some pyroclastic rocks are also present. Its peralkalinity is unique among other volcanoes in the Iskut volcanic field, which range in composition from alkali basalt to hawaiite. Hoodoo Mountain has also been designated as a subglacial volcano due to much of the mountain having formed subglacially in the last 85,000 years. Its involvement with glaciation has resulted in several interactions with glacial ice as much as 2 km (1.2 mi) thick, affording multiple examples of glaciovolcanic processes. This includes the formation of ice-marginal lava flows and the interlayering of glacial till with volcanic deposits.

Hoodoo Mountain's constant struggle with surrounding and overlying ice is attested by its nearly flat summit, which attains an elevation of 1,850 m (6,070 ft). Lava flows from Hoodoo Mountain partially bury Little Bear Mountain, a much smaller and older basaltic volcano immediately to the north. Both volcanoes are underlain by plutonic rocks and metamorphosed volcanic and sedimentary rocks of Stikinia. These basement rocks are of Paleozoic-to-Mesozoic age; pyroxene-bearing syenite composes a significant portion of the Mesozoic basement. Intruding the basement rocks are 1.8-million-year-old trachyandesite dikes, (Note: A dike is a sheet-shaped intrusion of magma into pre-existing rock.) which represent the earliest known manifestations of Quaternary magmatism in the Iskut region.

Hoodoo Mountain has been described as "one of the most magnificent and interesting mountains in northern British Columbia". This is because it has a different lithological and topographical structure than most glaciated mountains in the Canadian Cordillera. In contrast to its rugged counterparts, Hoodoo Mountain is symmetrical and circular in form. It has a basal diameter of around 6 km (3.7 mi), a volume of 17.3 km^{3} (4.2 mi^{3}) and a topographic prominence of 900 m (3,000 ft), making it the smallest of the four volcanoes composing the Stikine Subprovince. Hoodoos, pillar-like rock formations after which the volcano is named, are as much as 150 m (490 ft) in height and give the mountain a unique appearance. In 1919, a landslide removed lava rock from a 580 m (1,900 ft) wide section on the western side of Hoodoo Mountain.

Two sets of prominent cliffs partially circumscribe Hoodoo Mountain, which give the volcano a discontinuous, step-like topographic profile. The lower set of cliffs delimit the base of the volcano except for its southeastern margin where they have been partially overrun by younger lava flows. These cliffs form a broad bench at an elevation of approximately 1,300 m (4,300 ft) and are 100 to 200 m (330 to 660 ft) high. The upper set of cliffs surround the summit and are between 50 and 100 m (160 and 330 ft) high. Both sets of cliffs formed as a result of lava erupting in a glaciated environment. As lava travelled down slope, the lava came into contact with glacial ice that completely surrounded Hoodoo Mountain and cooled very quickly, forming a barrier around the entire volcano. This is demonstrated by the glassy texture of the lava and columnar jointing, which indicate fairly quick cooling of an erupted lava flow. The lava cooled, pooled and as the glacial ice receded, it left behind massive lava cliffs.

=== Subfeatures ===
The south–central side of Hoodoo Mountain contains a large depression called Long Valley. This feature, having formed by glacial erosion, contains a series of domes with adjacent lava spines. Pointer Ridge on the north–central side of Hoodoo Mountain consists of pyroclastic rocks that form a 200 m (660 ft) thick stratigraphic unit. The Wall, a more than 200 m (660 ft) high cliff at the western base of Hoodoo Mountain, forms the front of an ice-marginal lava flow that displays columnar jointing. The Monument on the southwestern side of Hoodoo Mountain is a vertical rock column that reaches more than 100 m (330 ft) in height. It is the eroded remains of a volcanic vent that was fed by a west-trending dike. Horn Ridge, a 20 m (66 ft) high ridge on the north side of Hoodoo Mountain, consists of highly vesicular lava flows that are locally heavily jointed.

The northeastern side of Hoodoo Mountain contains a J-shaped cliff called The Hook. Like The Wall to the southwest, The Hook is the front of an ice-marginal lava flow. Slide Canyon consists of a large chasm that cuts deeply into the southwestern side of Hoodoo Mountain. It is intruded by several dikes, including the one that fed The Monument. Pumice Point on the northwestern side of Hoodoo Mountain contains highly vesicular, lapilli (Note: Lapilli is volcanic ejecta ranging from 1 to 64 mm (0.039 to 2.520 in) in diameter.) to block-sized fragments of "woody pumice" up to 15 centimetres (5.9 inches) long. Extending from the northwestern side of Hoodoo Mountain is the Northwest Flow, a lava flow with well-preserved levees. Lava channels up to 20 m (66 ft) wide occur throughout the flow. The Southwest Flow is a large lava flow on the southwestern side of Hoodoo Mountain that appears to have issued from a poorly formed cinder cone.

=== Volcanic history ===
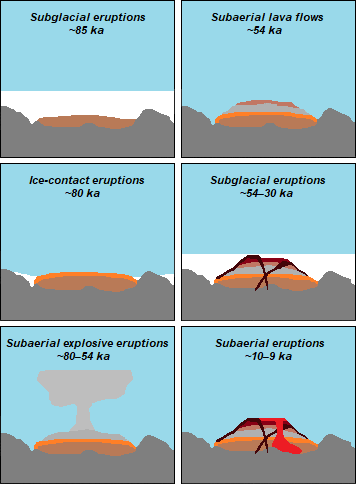
The six eruptive periods of Hoodoo Mountain

Hoodoo Mountain has experienced at least six eruptive periods over the last 85,000 years. This includes three periods involving volcano-ice interaction and three periods with no apparent ice involvement. They were marked by pyroclastic eruptions, lava flows and subglacial eruptions of peralkaline magmas. These magmas were phonolitic and trachytic in composition, having possibly evolved from differentiation of alkali basaltic melts in the mid-crust. Several tephra layers in the Bob Quinn Lake, Dease Lake and Finlay River areas of northern British Columbia may have originated from Hoodoo Mountain.

==== Eruptive periods ====
The first eruptive period 85,000 years ago produced massive subglacial lava flows and associated hyaloclastite breccia. These volcanic deposits are mainly exposed on the southwestern and northwestern flanks where they are about 500 to 1,000 m (1,600 to 3,300 ft) thick. The lava flows display small diameter columnar joints and are aphanitic (Note: Aphanitic pertains to magmatic rocks that are so fine-grained that their component mineral crystals are not visible to the naked eye.) in nature with low vesicularity. It remains unclear whether or not the subglacial eruptions during this period completely melted the overlying ice. Glacial till underlying the southwestern flank indicates the area had already experienced past glaciations before the onset of volcanic activity.

Subaerial eruptions from near the summit took place during the second eruptive period 80,000 years ago. Lava travelled down slope from an elevation of roughly 1,350 m (4,430 ft), but was then confined by thick glacial ice at an elevation of about 700 m (2,300 ft). Here, the lava cooled and pooled to create the lower discontinuous set of cliffs around the entire base of Hoodoo Mountain. These ice-marginal lava flows vary from about 30 m (98 ft) to more than 200 m (660 ft) thick and often contain horizontally oriented columnar joints, indicative of a vertical cooling surface. The Wall at the western base of Hoodoo Mountain formed during this eruptive period. Subsequent glacial movements over these flows created north–south trending striations (Note: Striations are scratches or gouges cut into rock by glacial abrasion.) that are consistent with current movements of the Hoodoo and Twin glaciers. Both of these valley glaciers are now roughly 500 m (1,600 ft) below the striations due to their ongoing glacial retreat.

After the regional ice had disappeared from lower elevations, subaerial explosive eruptions of the third eruptive period took place 80,000–54,000 years ago. This explosivity generated pyroclastic flows on the northern flank where they deposited a roughly 100 m (330 ft) thick sequence of pyroclastic material. The sequence consists of non-welded lapilli tuff within a matrix of yellow to light green ash, as well as three highly welded lenses up to about 5 m (16 ft) thick. Volcanic glass of phonolitic or trachytic composition occurs within the sequence. A 10 m (33 ft) thick subaerial lava flow travelled down the north–central and northeast flanks of Hoodoo Mountain during the latter stages of this eruptive period. It directly overlies the pyroclastic sequence and contains abundant fresh and devitrified glass.

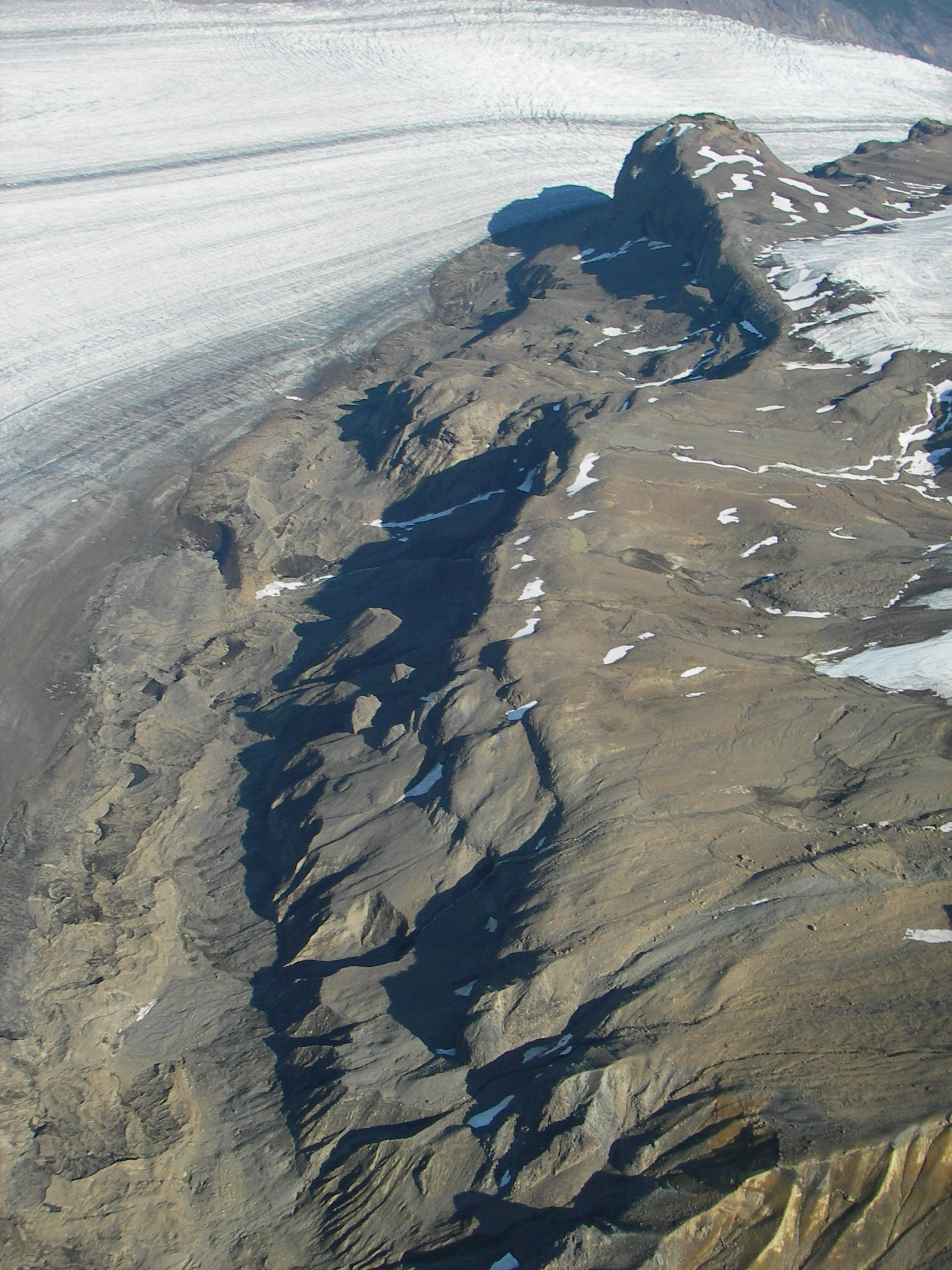
Lava flows exposed on the north side of Hoodoo Mountain adjacent to Twin Glacier

The fourth eruptive period 54,000 years ago produced a subaerially erupted sequence of up to five stacked lava flows on the north–central and southwestern flanks. Individual flows vary from 10 to 30 m (33 to 98 ft) thick and are separated by 1 to 10 m (3.3 to 32.8 ft) of lava breccia, giving the sequence a total thickness of around 200 m (660 ft). The lava flows do not appear to have interacted with glacial ice, suggesting that at least the upper flanks of Hoodoo Mountain were ice-free at the time of their eruption. Columnar joints more than 1 m (3.3 ft) thick characterize these flows.

After a period of eruptions showing no apparent evidence for ice interaction, subglacial eruptions resumed 54,000–30,000 years ago, signalling the build-up of regional ice levels. This fifth eruptive period occurred in two stages. The first stage took place 54,000–40,000 years ago when the overriding glacial ice was possibly more than 2 km (1.2 mi) thick. Isolated vents produced a wide variety of volcanic deposits extensively distributed around the entire summit region. This includes subglacially erupted lava lobes and domes, as well as ice-chilled breccia and hyaloclastite, which form a 400 m (1,300 ft) thick volcanic unit. The second stage 40,000–30,000 years ago was characterized by fissure-fed eruptions beneath relatively thin ice cover. These eruptions produced a roughly 30 to 50 m (98 to 164 ft) thick unit of lava flows, lava lobes and breccia on the north–central, northwestern and western flanks of Hoodoo Mountain.

The sixth and final eruptive period began 10,000–9,000 years ago with the eruption of 5 to 10 m (16 to 33 ft) thick phonolitic lava flows from vents near the summit. They travelled down the north–central, northwestern, southeastern and southwestern flanks of Hoodoo Mountain without encountering any glacial ice, suggesting that the flows were erupted subaerially after the regional ice had disappeared from lower elevations. Lava flows on the north–central flank display radially-oriented cooling joints. The Northwest Flow travelled about 3 km (1.9 mi) down slope and partially covers cliffs at the base of Hoodoo Mountain. Lava flows on the southeastern flank drape down 50 m (160 ft) high cliffs and extend into the Twin Glacier valley where they spread out into a broad terminal lobe. The Southwest Flow travelled about 3 km (1.9 mi) down slope to near the Hoodoo River. These lava flows are considered by the Smithsonian Institution's Global Volcanism Program to have been erupted in 7050 BCE. However, the Southwest Flow may be much younger as age estimates of more than 180 years have been obtained from tree-ring dating on living trees. This lava flow has also not undergone erosion and it still attains its original characteristics even though it is very easily broken. These observations have been taken to indicate a very recent origin, possibly not more than a few hundred years old.

==== Tephra layers ====
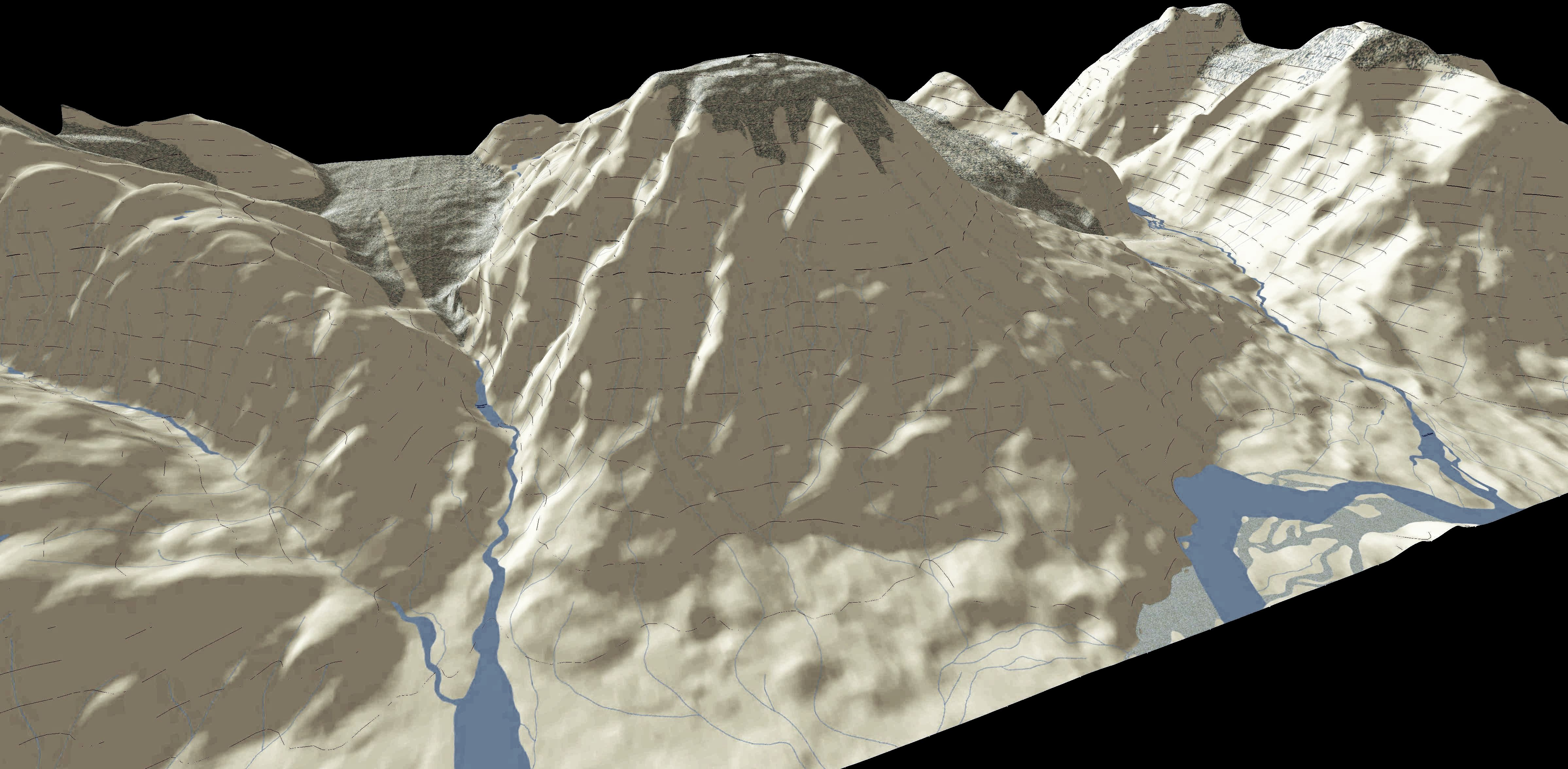
3D model of Hoodoo Mountain

Hoodoo Mountain is a possible source of the Finlay tephras. These are two 5 to 10 mm (0.20 to 0.39 in) thick phonolitic to trachytic tephra layers in the Dease Lake and Finlay River areas. Radiocarbon dating of terrestrial plant macrofossils directly overlying the youngest tephra layer suggest an early Holocene age for this volcanic material. The glass composition of the tephras is similar to the average whole-rock chemistry of the phonolitic lava flows produced during the final eruptive period at Hoodoo Mountain. However, this eruptive period is not known to have produced any pyroclastic deposits or tephras. Therefore other possible sources have been considered, including Level Mountain, Heart Peaks and the Mount Edziza volcanic complex.

A 12 mm (0.47 in) thick trachytic tephra layer of unknown origin occurs in sediments at Bob Quinn Lake 60 km (37 mi) northeast of Hoodoo Mountain. The areal distribution of this tephra is poorly constrained, but it may extend further to the east. Hoodoo Mountain is a possible source of this tephra due to its location along the trajectory of any ash plume from this volcano. The exact age of this tephra layer is unknown, but its stratigraphic position suggests that it is about 7,000–8,000 calendar years old. No volcanic deposits of this age are known at Hoodoo Mountain, but there may be younger deposits that are completely covered by the summit ice cap.

=== Hazards and monitoring ===
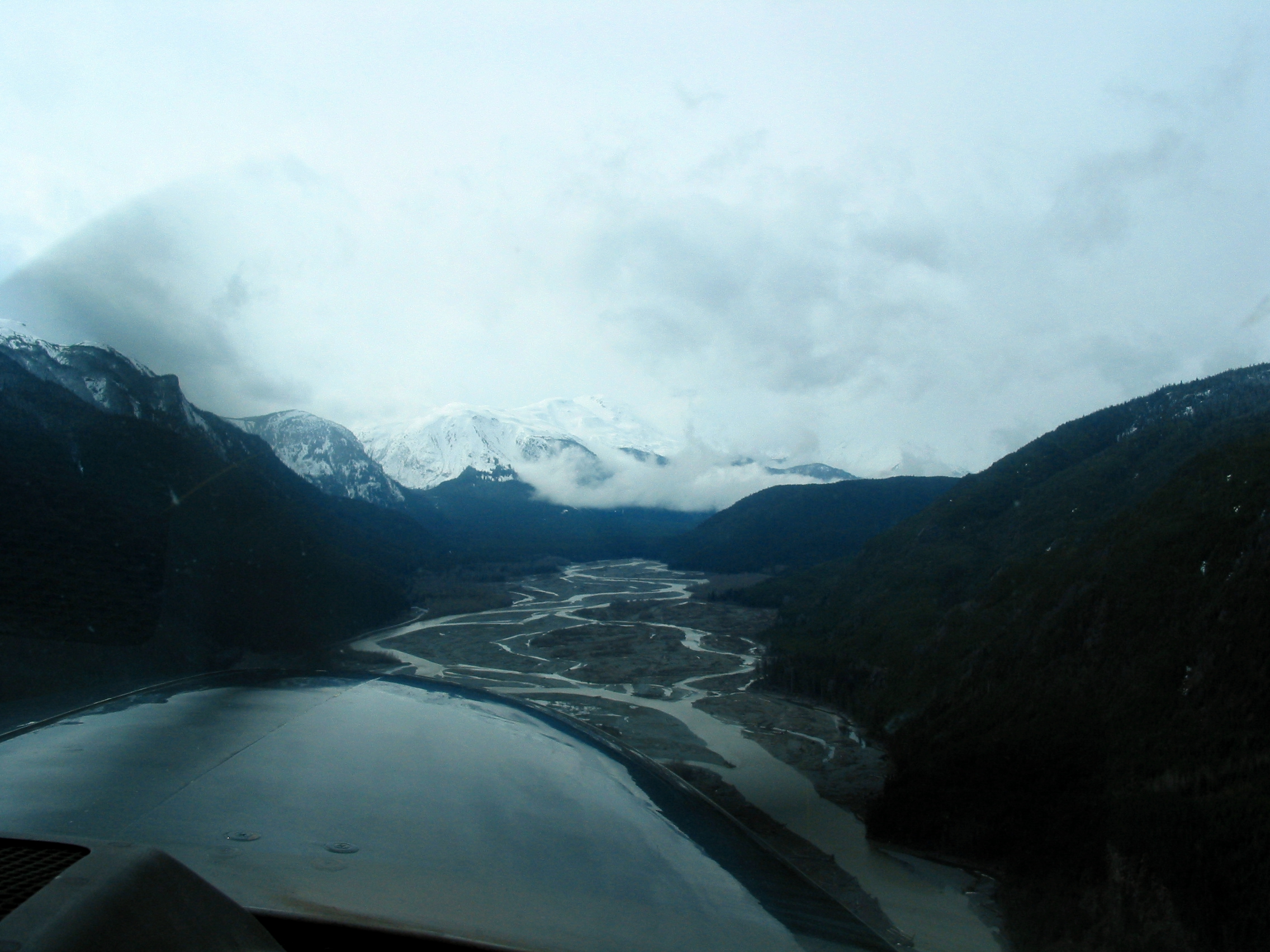
Damming of the Iskut River by lava could damage mining infrastructure within the floodplain due to flooding.

Hoodoo Mountain is a dormant, but potentially active volcano, having experienced at least eight seismic events since 1985. Hazards stemming from renewed volcanism are lava flows and flooding, as well as fallout from explosive eruptions. Lava flows generated by effusive eruptions could dam the Iskut River and pose a major hazard to mining operations upstream due to rising waters. A major eruption could also significantly melt the summit ice cap or the adjacent glaciers to produce large-scale flooding of the Iskut River and the lower Stikine River. Such flooding could significantly disrupt the Stikine River salmon fishery, although it would not be as disruptive to mining operations. A jökulhlaup is unlikely due to the lack of a caldera to fill with meltwater. Explosive eruptions could produce significant pyroclastic fall to disrupt local mining operations, as well as airborne ash which would potentially disrupt air traffic to and from the mining camps. Air traffic between Canada, Alaska and Asia would likely be disrupted by high eruption columns due to the presence of major airways near the volcano.

Like other volcanoes in the NCVP, Hoodoo Mountain is not monitored closely enough by the GSC to ascertain its activity level. The Canadian National Seismograph Network has been established to monitor earthquakes throughout Canada, but it is too far away to provide an accurate indication of activity under the mountain. It may sense an increase in seismic activity if Hoodoo Mountain becomes highly restless, but this may only provide a warning for a large eruption; the system might detect activity only once the volcano has started erupting. If Hoodoo Mountain were to erupt, mechanisms exist to orchestrate relief efforts. The Interagency Volcanic Event Notification Plan was created to outline the notification procedure of some of the main agencies that would respond to an erupting volcano in Canada, an eruption close to the Canada–United States border or any eruption that would affect Canada.

== Human history ==
=== Geological studies ===
The volcanic deposits at Hoodoo Mountain were briefly described in 1948 by F. A. Kerr of the Geological Survey of Canada (GSC) while studying the regional geology along the southern part of the Iskut River. According to Kerr, "the volcano erupted in the centre of an old valley that must have drained to the Iskut about 3 miles above the present Hoodoo River [...] Successive outflows from the volcano repeatedly disrupted the drainage, so that the flanking streams and glaciers have had a difficult struggle to maintain their channels." An ice-filled crater was speculated by Kerr to underlie the summit ice cap. In 1991, Canadian volcanologist Jack Souther provided a short account of the geomorphology of Hoodoo Mountain, as well as some age-constraints from preliminary potassium–argon dating. Hoodoo Mountain's relatively flat-topped geomorphology led Souther to refer to it as a tuya, even though its summit lacks a capping sequence of subaerial lavas typical of tuyas. It does, however, coincide with Souther's original use of the term tuya in that its overall geomorphology has been strongly influenced by interaction between ice and lava. The first detailed summary of the Quaternary stratigraphy and petrology of Hoodoo Mountain was compiled in 1997 by American geologist Ben Edwards who produced a detailed geological map of the volcano.

An expedition consisting of university, GSC and industry scientists was organized in 1997 to assess the nature and magnitude of hazards posed by Hoodoo Mountain. This included mapping of the shape of the summit ice cap using ground-penetrating radar and ice radar, as well as the production of a preliminary hazard assessment for the Iskut area. Analysis of data indicated the absence of a caldera or large crater beneath the ice cap. Instead, the underlying topography was shown to be characteristic of an inverted and very shallow saucer. The use of radars to penetrate the ice cap and to assess the subglacial topography proved to be instrumental for studying other glaciated volcanoes in the American Cordillera and elsewhere. Personnel involved in the 1997 expedition were Catherine Hickson and Mark Stasiuk of the GSC, Jim Nicholls of the University of Calgary, Jeff Schmok and Guy Cross of Golder Associates, Alison Rust, Ben Edwards and Kelly Russell of the University of British Columbia, and Trevor Page of Lancaster University. By 2002, Hoodoo Mountain was no longer the least studied volcano of the Stikine Subprovince.

=== Mining ===
The Hoodoo Mountain area contains several large mining camps within the floodplain of the Iskut River. Prospecting in Bronson Creek commenced as early as 1907, during which time several mining claims had been staked. This was followed by drifting, trenching and stripping of several gold-bearing veins between 1910 and 1920. A drilling program conducted by the Hudson Bay Mining and Smelting Company from 1954 to 1960 identified copper prospects. In 1964, Cominco optioned claims from Jodi Explorations and the Tuksi Mining Company. A drilling program to test copper mineralization on the Red Bluff claim was completed by Cominco in 1965. Texas Gulf Sulphur examined the area for its copper and base metal content from 1973 to 1974.

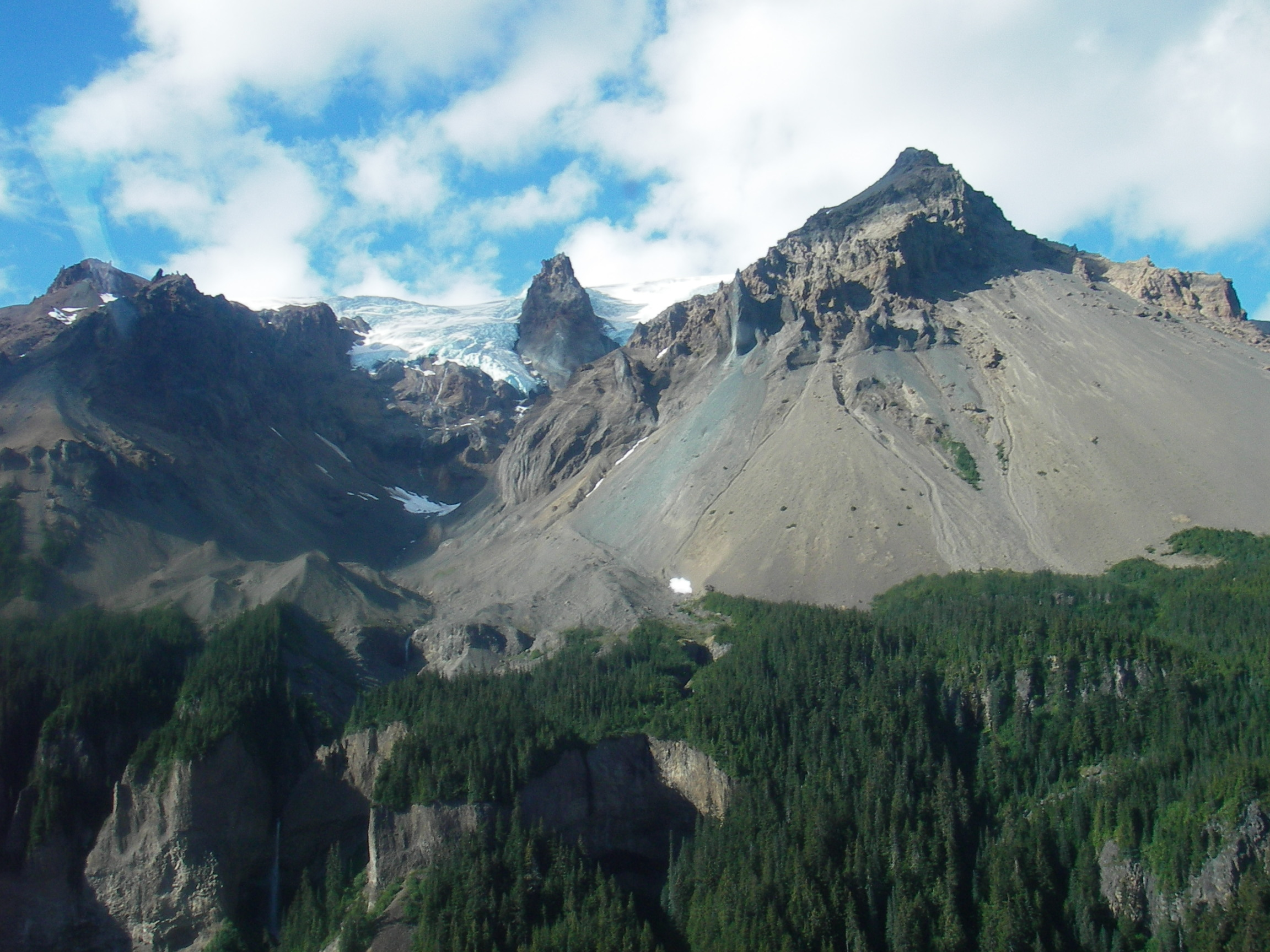
Looking up to the summit ice cap of Hoodoo Mountain from the south

Exploration of the Pickaxe Vein by Skyline Gold began in 1980 to define its gold potential. This was followed by the discovery of the Discovery Vein in 1981, which led to further drilling and the discovery of a high-grade gold vein in 1982 that became known as the 16 Vein. Surveying, drilling and trenching was carried out by Skyline Gold, Placer Development and Anaconda Canada Exploration between 1982 and 1988. The Johnny Mountain Mine commenced production in November 1988 after having been engaged in pre-production since January of that year. This small underground mine operated until August 1990 when high operating costs and low gold prices forced it to shut down. This was followed by closure of the ore mill in September of that year. The mine remained closed until 1993 when further mining and milling took place. A total of 196,358 tonnes of ore was mined from 1988 to 1993, from which 1,008,109 kilograms (2,222,500 pounds) of copper, 4,348,814 grams (153,399.9 ounces) of silver and 2,815,393 grams (99,310.1 ounces) of gold was recovered. Intermittent mineral exploration has taken place at the Johnny Mountain Mine since its closure in 1993.

In 1982, Cominco staked two mining claims over their Red Bluff property and adjacent ground near the junction of the Craig and Iskut rivers. A geochemical survey consisting of 26 rock and 36 soil samples was completed by Cominco in 1985. Exploration work from 1986 to 1987 included geochemical soil surveys, trenching and 15,494 m (50,833 ft) of diamond drilling in 86 holes. The Snip Mine began as an underground exploration program in March 1988; three levels were established 180 metres (590 feet), 300 m (980 ft) and 340 m (1,120 ft) underground. About 41,000 m (135,000 ft) of underground diamond drilling and 4,200 m (13,800 ft) of underground work was completed between August 1988 and October 1989. By mid-1990, 63,700 m (209,000 ft) of surface and underground diamond drilling had been completed.

The Snip Mine, owned jointly by Cominco and Prime Resources, began production in January 1991. An airstrip was used continuously to ship ore concentrate from the mine until May 1999 when all mining operations ceased. Production throughout the mine's lifespan amounted to 249,276 kilograms (549,560 pounds) of copper, 32,093,000 grams (1,132,000 ounces) of gold, and 12,183,000 grams (429,700 ounces) of silver from 1.2 million tonnes of ore mined. Mineral exploration has occurred at the Snip Mine intermittently since its closure in 1999.

== Accessibility ==
Hoodoo Mountain is in a remote location with no established road access. The closest point accessible by road is Bob Quinn Lake about 60 km (37 mi) northeast of Hoodoo Mountain along the Stewart–Cassiar Highway. From there the mountain can be reached by charter helicopter or by trekking across mountainous terrain with extreme difficulty. Alternatively, fixed-wing aircraft landings can be made on the Bronson Creek runway immediately south of Hoodoo Mountain. The mountain can also be approached from the Alaskan community of Wrangell by boating up the Stikine and Iskut rivers.

== See also ==
- List of Northern Cordilleran volcanoes
- List of volcanoes in Canada
- Volcanism of Western Canada
