= Geology of the Pacific Northwest =

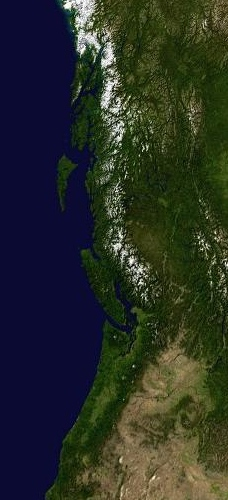
The Pacific Northwest from space

The geology of the Pacific Northwest includes the composition (including rock, minerals, and soils), structure, physical properties and the processes that shape the Pacific Northwest region of North America. The region is part of the Ring of Fire: the subduction of the Pacific and Farallon Plates under the North American Plate is responsible for many of the area's scenic features as well as some of its hazards, such as volcanoes, earthquakes, and landslides.

The geology of the Pacific Northwest is vast and complex. Most of the region began forming about 200 million years ago as the North American Plate started to drift westward during the rifting of Pangaea. Since that date, the western edge of North America has grown westward as a succession of island arcs and assorted ocean-floor rocks have been added along the continental margin.

There are at least five geologic provinces in the area: the Cascade Volcanoes, the Columbia Plateau, the North Cascades, the Coast Mountains, and the Insular Mountains. The Cascade Volcanoes are an active volcanic region along the western side of the Pacific Northwest. The Columbia Plateau is a region of subdued geography that is inland of the Cascade Volcanoes, and the North Cascades are a mountainous region in the northwest corner of the United States, extending into British Columbia. The Coast Mountains and Insular Mountains are a strip of mountains along the coast of British Columbia, each with its own geological history.

== Volcanoes ==
=== The Cascade Volcanoes ===
The Cascades Province forms an arc-shaped band extending from southwestern British Columbia to Northern California, roughly parallel to the Pacific coastline. Within this region, nearly 20 major volcanic centers lie in sequence.

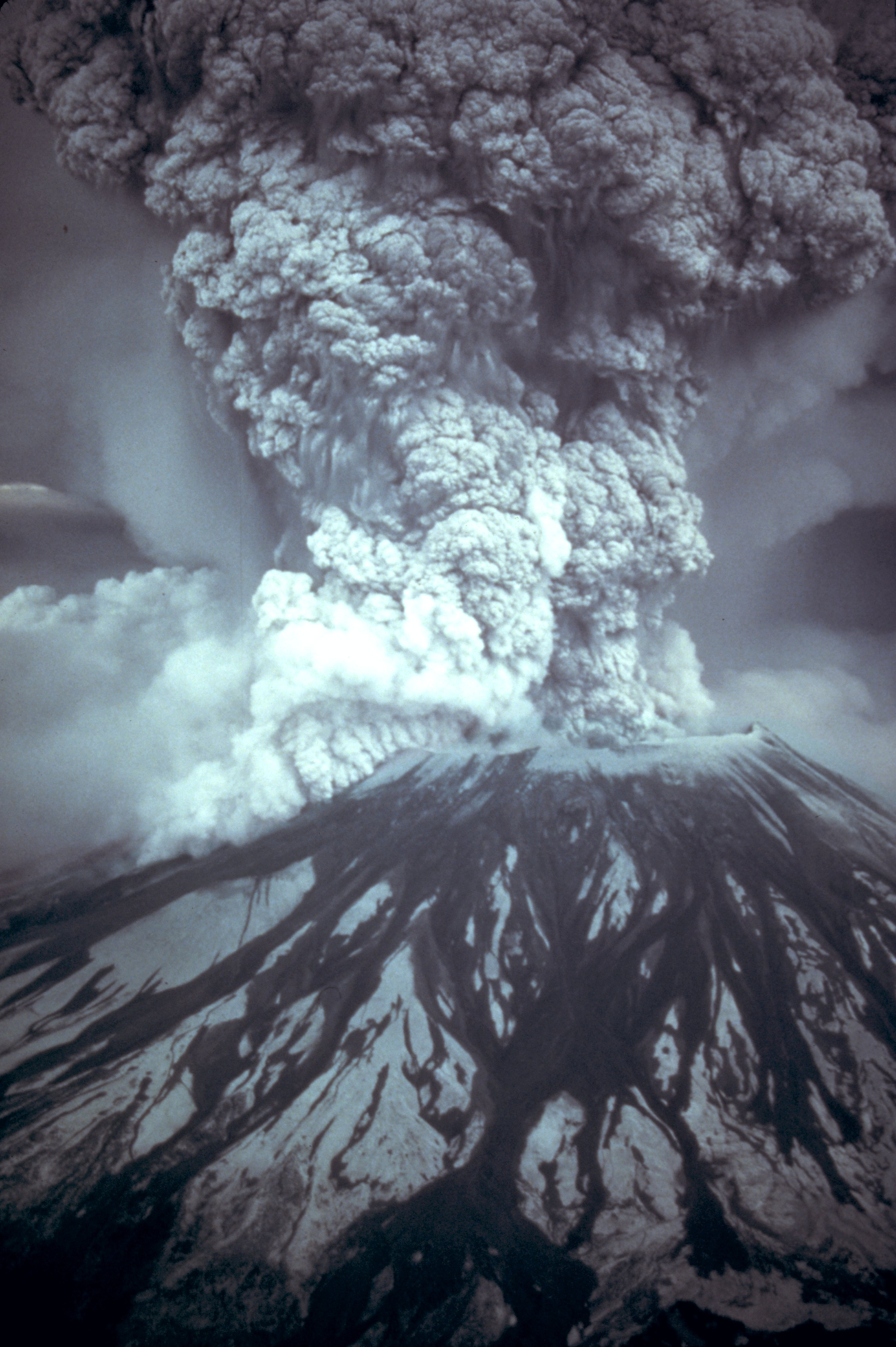
Mount St. Helens erupts on May 18, 1980

Although the largest volcanoes like Mount St. Helens get the most attention, the Cascade Volcanic Arc includes a band of thousands of very small, short-lived volcanoes that have built a platform of lava and volcanic debris. Rising above this volcanic platform are a few strikingly large volcanoes that dominate the landscape.

The Cascade volcanoes define the Pacific Northwest section of the Ring of Fire, an array of volcanoes that rim the Pacific Ocean. The Ring of Fire is also known for its frequent earthquakes. The volcanoes and earthquakes arise from a common source: subduction.

Beneath the Cascade Volcanic Arc, a dense oceanic plate sinks beneath the North American Plate; a process known as subduction. As the oceanic slab sinks deep into the Earth's interior beneath the continental plate, high temperatures and pressures allow water molecules locked in the minerals of solid rock to escape. The supercritical water rises into the pliable mantle above the subducting plate, causing some of the mantle to melt. This newly formed magma ascends upward through the crust along a path of least resistance, both by way of fractures and faults as well as by melting wall rocks. The addition of melted crust changes the geochemical composition. Some of the melt rises toward the Earth's surface to erupt, forming a chain of volcanoes (the Cascade Volcanic Arc) above the subduction zone. The addition of crustal melt to the original mantle melt results in volcanic and plutonic rocks that differ in mineralogy from the mantle source.

A close-up look at the Cascades reveals a more complicated picture than a simple subduction zone.

Not far off the coast of the North Pacific lies a spreading ridge; a divergent plate boundary made up of a series of breaks in the oceanic crust where melted mantle rises and solidifies, creating new ocean crust. On one side of the spreading ridge new Pacific Plate crust is made, then moves away from the ridge. On the other side of the spreading ridge the Juan de Fuca and Gorda plates move eastward.

Image of the Juan de Fuca Plate that produced the magnitude 8.7–9.2 Cascadia earthquake in 1700.

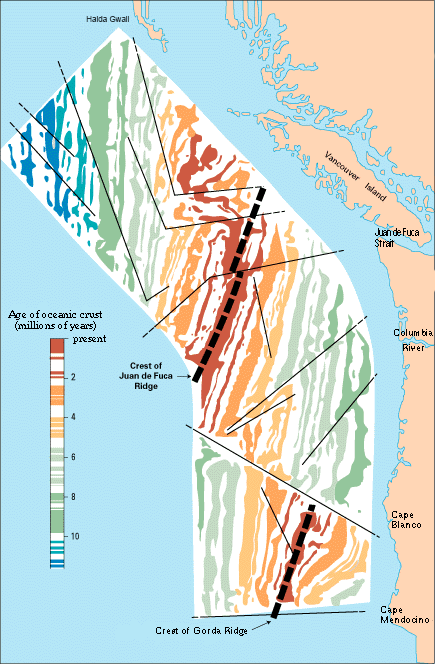
Magnetic anomalies around the Juan de Fuca and Gorda Ridges, off the west coast of North America, color coded by age.

There are some unusual features at the Cascade subduction zone. Where the Juan de Fuca Plate sinks beneath the North American Plate there is no deep trench, seismicity (earthquakes) is less than expected, and there is evidence of a decline in volcanic activity over the past few million years. The probable explanation lies in the rate of convergence between the Juan de Fuca and North American Plates. These two plates converge at 3–4 centimetres (1.2–1.6 in) per year at present. This is only about half the rate of convergence of 7 million years ago.

The small Juan de Fuca Plate and two platelets, the Explorer Plate and Gorda Plate are the meager remnants of the much larger Farallon oceanic plate. The Explorer Plate broke away from the Juan de Fuca about 4 million years ago and shows no evidence that it is still being subducted. The Gorda platelet split away between 18 and 5 million years ago and continues to sink beneath North America.

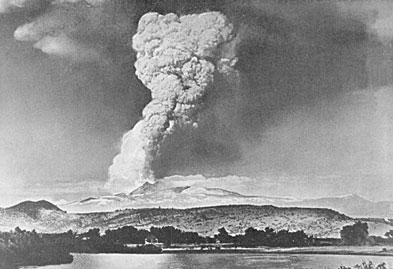
May 1915 Lassen Peak eruption column

The Cascade Volcanic Arc made its first appearance 36 million years ago, but the major peaks that rise up from today's volcanic centers were born within the last 1.6 million years. More than 3,000 vents erupted during the most recent volcanic episode that began 5 million years ago. As long as subduction continues, new Cascade volcanoes will continue to rise.

=== Volcanism outside the Cascades ===
Map of the Garibaldi Volcanic Belt centers.

The Garibaldi Volcanic Belt in southwestern British Columbia is the northern extension of the Cascade Volcanic Arc in the United States and contains the most explosive young volcanoes in Canada. Like the rest of the arc, it has its origins in the Cascadia subduction zone. Volcanoes of the Garibaldi Volcanic Belt have been sporadically active over a time span of several millions of years. The northernmost member, the Mount Meager massif, was responsible for a major catastrophic eruption that occurred about 2,350 years ago. This eruption may have been close in size to that of the 1980 eruption of Mount St. Helens. Ash from this eruption can be traced eastward to western Alberta. It is also the most unstable volcanic massif in Canada, which has dumped clay and rock several meters (yards) deep into the Pemberton Valley at least three times during the past 7,300 years. Hot springs near the Mount Cayley and Mount Meager massifs suggest that magmatic heat is still present. The long history of volcanism in the region, coupled with continued subduction off the coast, suggests that volcanism has not yet ended in the Garibaldi Volcanic Belt. A few isolated volcanic centers northwest of the Mount Meager massif such as the Franklin Glacier Complex and the Silverthrone Caldera, which lie in the Pemberton Volcanic Belt, may also be the product of Cascadia subduction, but geologic investigations have been very limited in this remote region. About 5–7 million years ago, the northern end of the Juan de Fuca Plate broke off along the Nootka Fault to form the Explorer Plate, and there is no definitive consensus among geologists on the relation of the volcanoes north of that fault to the rest of the Cascade Arc. However, the Pemberton Volcanic Belt is usually merged with the Garibaldi Volcanic Belt, making Mount Silverthrone the northernmost, but an uncertain Cascadia subduction-related volcano.

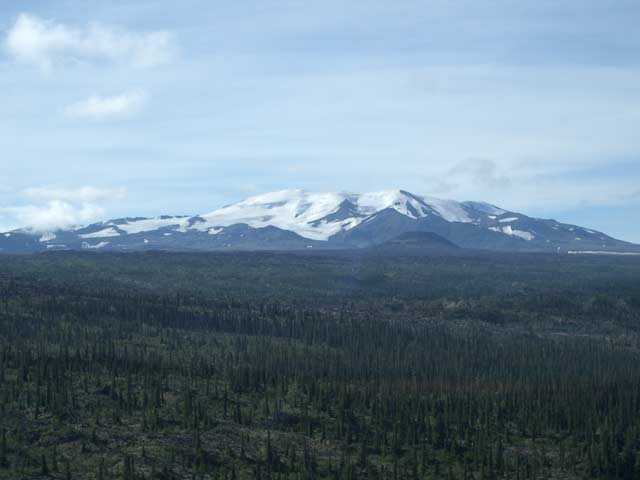
Mount Edziza, a large shield volcano in northwestern British Columbia

The most active volcanic region of the northern Pacific Northwest is called the Northern Cordilleran Volcanic Province (sometimes called the Stikine Volcanic Belt). It contains more than 100 young volcanoes and several eruptions known to have occurred within the last 400 years. The last eruptions within the volcanic belt was about 150 years ago at The Volcano in the Iskut-Unuk River Cones volcanic field. The most voluminous and most persistent eruptive center within the belt and in Canada is Level Mountain. It is a large shield volcano that covers an area of 1,800 km^{2} (690 sq mi) southwest of Dease Lake and north of Telegraph Creek. The broad dissected summit region consists of trachytic and rhyolitic lava domes and was considered to be dotted with several minor basaltic vents of postglacial age, although considered Holocene activity to be uncertain. The Mount Edziza volcanic complex is perhaps the most spectacular volcanic edifice in British Columbia. It is the second largest persistent eruptive center within the Northern Cordilleran Volcanic Province and is flanked with numerous young satellite cones, including the young, well-preserved Eve Cone. There are some indications that Level Mountain and Mount Edziza volcanic complex may be between 11 and 9 million years old.

Map of the Anahim Volcanic Belt centers.

The Anahim Volcanic Belt is a volcanic belt that stretches from just north of Vancouver Island to near Quesnel. It is thought to have formed as a result of the North American Plate moving over a stationary hotspot, similar to the hotspot feeding the Hawaiian Islands, called the Anahim hotspot. The youngest volcano within the volcanic belt is Nazko Cone. It last erupted about 7,000 years ago, producing two small lava flows that traveled 1 km (0.6 mi) to the west, along with a blanket of volcanic ash that extends several km to the north and east of the cone. The volcanic belt also contains three large shield volcanoes that were formed between 8 and 1 million years ago, called the Ilgachuz Range, Rainbow Range and the Itcha Range.

The Chilcotin Group in southern British Columbia is a north–south range of volcanoes, thought to have formed as a result of back-arc extension behind the Cascadia subduction zone. The majority of the eruptions in this belt happened either 6 to 10 million years ago (Miocene) or 2–3 million years ago (Pliocene). However, there have been few eruptions in the Pleistocene.

The Wells Gray-Clearwater volcanic field in south-eastern British Columbia consists of several small basaltic volcanoes and extensive lava flows that have been active for the past 3 million years. It is within the Wells Gray Provincial Park, which also includes the 142 m (465 ft)-high Helmcken Falls. The origin of the volcanism is unknown, but is probably related to crustal thinning. Some of the lava flows in the field are similar to those that erupted at Volcano Mountain in the Yukon, where olivine nephelinite occurs. The last eruption in the field was about 400 years ago at Kostal Cone.

Numerous seamounts lie off British Columbia's coast and are related to hotspot volcanism. The Bowie Seamount located 180 km (110 mi) west of Haida Gwaii is perhaps the shallowest seamount in Canada's Pacific waters. Because of its shallow depth, scientists believe it was an active volcanic island throughout the last ice age. The Bowie Seamount is also the youngest seamount in the Kodiak-Bowie Seamount chain.

=== Volcanic disasters ===
The last eruption of the Tseax Cone around the years 1750 or 1775 is Canada's worst known geophysical disaster. The eruption produced a 22.5 km (14.0 mi) long lava flow, destroying the Nisga'a villages and the death of at least 2000 Nisga'a people by volcanic gases and poisonous smoke. The Nass River valley was inundated by the lava flows and contain abundant tree molds and lava tubes. The event coincided with the arrival of the first European explorers to penetrate the uncharted coastal waters of northern British Columbia. Today, the basaltic lava deposits are a draw to tourists and are part of the Nisga'a Memorial Lava Bed Provincial Park.

=== Recent volcanic activity ===
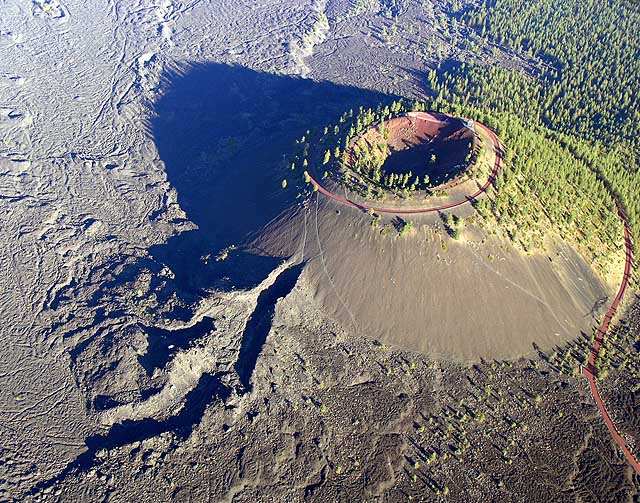
Lava Butte, Oregon, erupted roughly 5000 years BCE

The Pacific Northwest volcanoes continue to be a geologically active area. The most geologically recent volcanic eruptions include:

- Level Mountain, Canada's most voluminous and most persistent eruptive center, might have erupted in the Holocene.
- Nazko Cone, the youngest volcano in the Anahim Volcanic Belt, erupted 7200 BP.
- Hoodoo Mountain erupted 7050 BP.
- Lava Butte, Oregon erupted about 7,000 years ago.
- Mount Mazama, which erupted catastrophically in 5670 BCE to form Crater Lake.
- Mount Meager massif erupted about 2350 BP, sending an ash column 20 km (12 mi) high into the stratosphere.
- Mount Edziza volcanic complex, Canada's second largest eruptive center, erupted about 1340 BP.
- Medicine Lake Volcano erupted about 1000 BP.
- Silverthrone Caldera might have eruptions younger than 1000 BP.
- Kostal Cone in the Wells Gray-Clearwater volcanic field might have erupted and formed in 1500 based on tree-ring dating.
- Glacier Peak erupted in the 17th or 18th century.
- Tseax Cone erupted in the 18th century.
- Mount Hood erupted in 1781–82; fumaroles on the summit still spew sulfurous gas.
- Mount Shasta erupted in 1786.
- The Volcano erupted about 150 BP, producing a 22.5 km (14.0 mi) long lava flow.
- Mount Rainier erupted 1854.
- Mount Baker erupted in 1880; fumaroles still occur at its summit.
- Ruby Mountain might have erupted in 1898.
- Lassen Peak erupted in 1914–5.
- Mount St. Helens erupted in 1980, killing 57 people. (see 1980 eruption of Mount St. Helens).

== Seismic activity ==
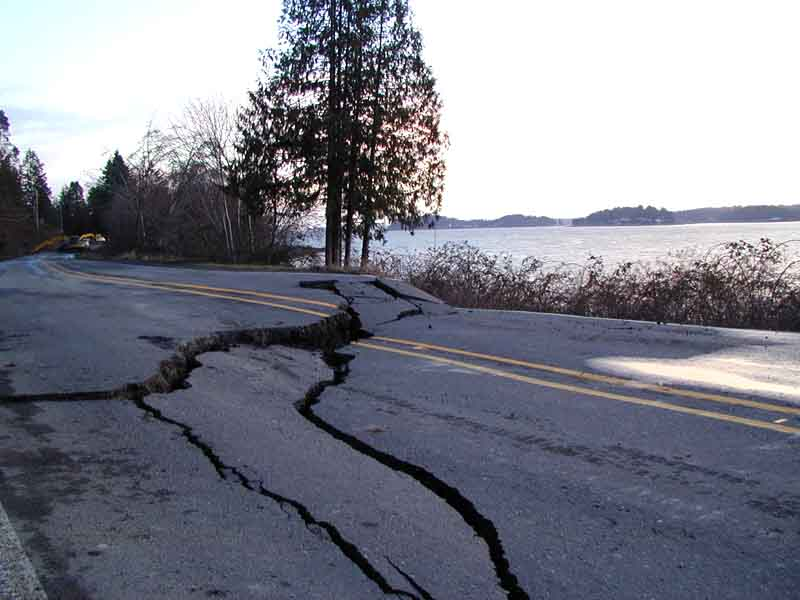
State Route 302 after the Nisqually earthquake

The Pacific Northwest is seismically active. The Juan de Fuca Plate is capable of producing megathrust earthquakes of moment magnitude 9: the last such earthquake was the 1700 Cascadia earthquake, which produced a tsunami in Japan, and may have temporarily blocked the Columbia River with the Bonneville Slide. More recently, in 2001, the Nisqually earthquake (magnitude 6.8) struck 16 km (10 mi) northeast of Olympia, Washington, causing some structural damage and panic.

In addition, eleven volcanoes in Canada have had seismic activity since 1975, including: the Silverthrone Caldera, Mount Meager massif, Wells Gray-Clearwater volcanic field, Mount Garibaldi, Mount Cayley, Castle Rock, The Volcano, Mount Edziza volcanic complex, Hoodoo Mountain, Crow Lagoon and Nazko Cone.

== Columbia Plateau ==
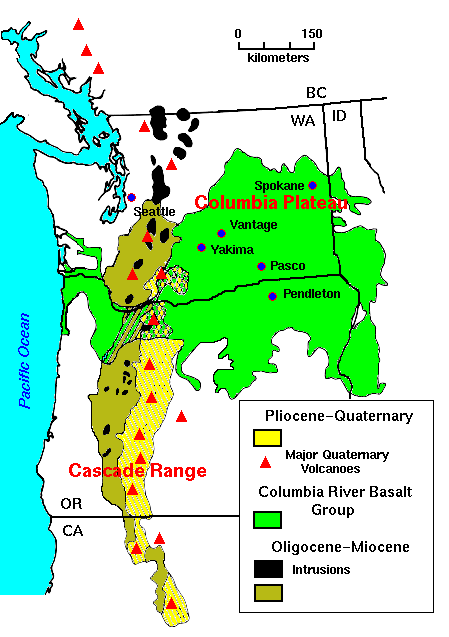
The Columbia River basalts cover portions of three states

The Columbia Plateau province is enveloped by one of the world's largest accumulations of basalt. Over 500,000 km^{2} (190,000 mi^{2}) of the Earth's surface is covered by it. The topography here is dominated by geologically young lava flows that inundated the countryside with amazing speed, all within the last 17 million years.

Over 170,000 km^{3} (41,000 mi^{3}) of basaltic lava, known as the Columbia River Basalt Group, covers the western part of the province. These tremendous flows erupted between 17–6 million years ago. Most of the lava flooded out in the first 1.5 million years: an extraordinarily short time for such an outpouring of molten rock.

The Snake River Plain stretches across Oregon, through northern Nevada, southern Idaho, and ends at the Yellowstone Plateau in Wyoming. Looking like a great spoon scooped out the Earth surface, the smooth topography of this province forms a striking contrast with the strong mountainous fabric around it.

The Snake River Plain lies in a distinct depression. At the western end, the base has dropped down along normal faults, forming a graben structure. Although there is extensive faulting at the eastern end, the structure is not as clear.

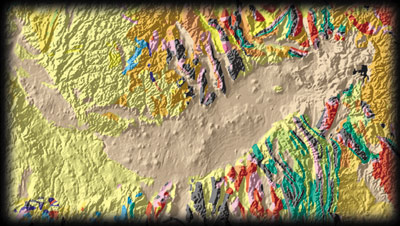
A map of the Snake River Plain, showing its smooth topography

Like the Columbia River region, volcanic eruptions dominate the story of the Snake River Plain in the eastern part of the Columbia Plateau Province. The earliest Snake River Plain eruptions began about 15 million years ago, just as the tremendous early eruptions of Columbia River Basalt were ending. But most of the Snake River Plain volcanic rock is less than a few million years old, Pliocene age (5–1.6 million years ago) and younger.

In the west, the Columbia River Basalts are just that: almost exclusively black basalt. Not so in the Snake River Plain, where relatively quiet eruptions of soupy black basalt lava flows alternated with tremendous explosive eruptions of rhyolite, a light-colored volcanic rock.

Cinder cones dot the landscape of the Snake River Plain. Some are aligned along vents, the fissures that fed flows and cone-building eruptions. Calderas, great pits formed by explosive volcanism, and low shield volcanoes, and rhyolite hills are also part of the landscape here, but many are obscured by later lava flows.

Evidence suggests that some concentrated heat source is melting rock beneath the Columbia Plateau Province. At the base of the lithosphere (the layer of crust and upper mantle that forms Earth's moving tectonic plates). In an effort to figure out why this area, far from a plate boundary, had such an enormous outpouring of lava, scientists established hardening dates for many of the individual lava flows. They found that the youngest volcanic rocks were clustered near the Yellowstone Plateau, and that the farther west they went, the older the lavas.

Although scientists are still gathering evidence, a probable explanation is that a hot spot, an extremely hot plume of deep mantle material, is rising to the surface beneath the Columbia Plateau Province. Geologists know that beneath Hawaii and Iceland, a temperature instability develops (for reasons not yet well understood) at the boundary between the core and mantle. The concentrated heat triggers a plume hundreds of kilometers in diameter that ascends directly through to the surface of the Earth.

When the hot plume arrives at the base of the lithosphere, some of the lighter rock of the lithosphere rapidly melts. It is this molten lithosphere that becomes the basalt lavas that gush onto the surface to form the Columbia River and Snake River Plain basalts.

The track of this hot spot starts in the west and sweeps up to Yellowstone National Park. The steaming fumaroles and explosive geysers are ample evidence of a concentration of heat beneath the surface. The hotspot is probably quite stationary, but the North American plate is moving over it, creating a superb record of the rate and direction of plate motion.

=== The Ice Age floods ===
With the beginning of the Pleistocene time (about one million years ago), cooling temperatures provided conditions favorable for the creation of continental glaciers. Over the centuries, as snowfall exceeded melting and evaporation, a great accumulation of snow covered part of the continent, forming extensive ice fields. This vast continental ice sheet reached a thickness of about 1,200 m (4,000 ft) in some areas. Sufficient pressure on the ice caused it to flow outward as a glacier. The glacier moved south out of Canada, damming rivers and creating lakes in Washington, Idaho and Montana.

The ice blocked the Clark Fork River, forming the huge Glacial Lake Missoula. The lake measured about 7,700 km^{2} (3,000 sq mi) and contained about 2,100 km^{3} (500 mi^{3}), half the volume of Lake Michigan.

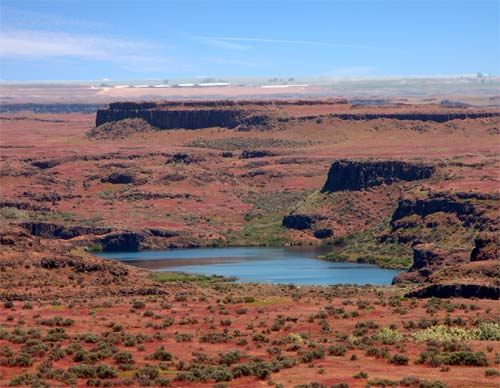
The immense floods created channels that are presently dry, such as the Drumheller Channels

Glacial Lake Missoula broke through the ice dam many times, allowing a tremendous volume of water to rush across northern Idaho and into eastern Washington. Such catastrophic floods raced across the southward-dipping plateau a number of times, etching the coulees which characterize this region, now known as the channeled scablands.

As the floods in this vicinity raced southward, two major cascades formed along their course. The larger cataract was that of the upper Grand Coulee, where the river roared over an 240 m (800 ft) waterfall. The eroding power of the water plucked pieces of basalt from the precipice, causing the falls to retreat 32 km (20 mi) and self-destruct by cutting through to the Columbia River valley near what is now the Grand Coulee Dam.

The other major cataract is now known as Dry Falls. It started near Soap Lake in Washington State, where less resistant basalt layers gave way before the great erosive power of this tremendous torrent and waterfalls developed. As in the upper Grand Coulee, the raging river yanked chunks of rock from the face of the falls and the falls eventually retreated to their present location. Dry Falls is 5.6 km (3.5 mi) wide, with a drop of more than 120 m (400 ft). By way of comparison, Niagara Falls, 1.6 km (1 mi) wide with a drop of only 50 m (165 ft), would be dwarfed by Dry Falls.

== The North Cascades ==
The North Cascade Range in Washington is part of the American cordillera, a mountain chain stretching more than 19,000 km (12,000 mi) from Tierra del Fuego to the Alaska Peninsula, and second only to the Alpine-Himalayan chain in height. Although only a small part of the Cordillera, mile for mile, the North Cascade Range is steeper and wetter than most other ranges in the contiguous United States.

In geology, the range has more in common with the Coast Ranges of British Columbia and Alaska than it does with its Cordilleran cousins in the Rocky Mountains or Sierra Nevada. Although the peaks of the North Cascades do not reach great elevations (high peaks are generally in the 2,100 to 2,400 m (7,000 to 8,000 ft) range, their overall relief, the relatively uninterrupted vertical distance from valley bottom to mountain top, is commonly 1,200 to 1,800 m (4,000 to 6,000 ft).

Rocks of the North Cascades record at least 400 million years of history. The record of this long history can be read in the many rock layers deposited over time through the forces of erosion, volcanic activity and plate subduction. These different forces have made a geologic mosaic made up of volcanic island arcs, deep ocean sediments, basaltic ocean floor, parts of old continents, submarine fans, and even pieces of the deep subcrustal mantle of the earth. The disparate pieces of the North Cascade mosaic were born far from one another but subsequently drifted together, carried along by the tectonic plates that make up the Earth's outer shell or were uplifted, eroded by streams, and then locally buried in their own eroded debris; other pieces were forced deep into the Earth to be heated and squeezed, almost beyond recognition, and then raised again to view. Over time, the moving plates eventually accreted the various pieces of the mosaic onto the western side of North America.

About 35 million years ago, a volcanic arc grew across this complex mosaic of old terranes. Volcanoes erupted to cover the older rocks with lava and ash. Large masses of molten rock invaded the older rocks from below. The volcanic arc is still active today, decorating the skyline with the cones of Mount Baker and Glacier Peak.

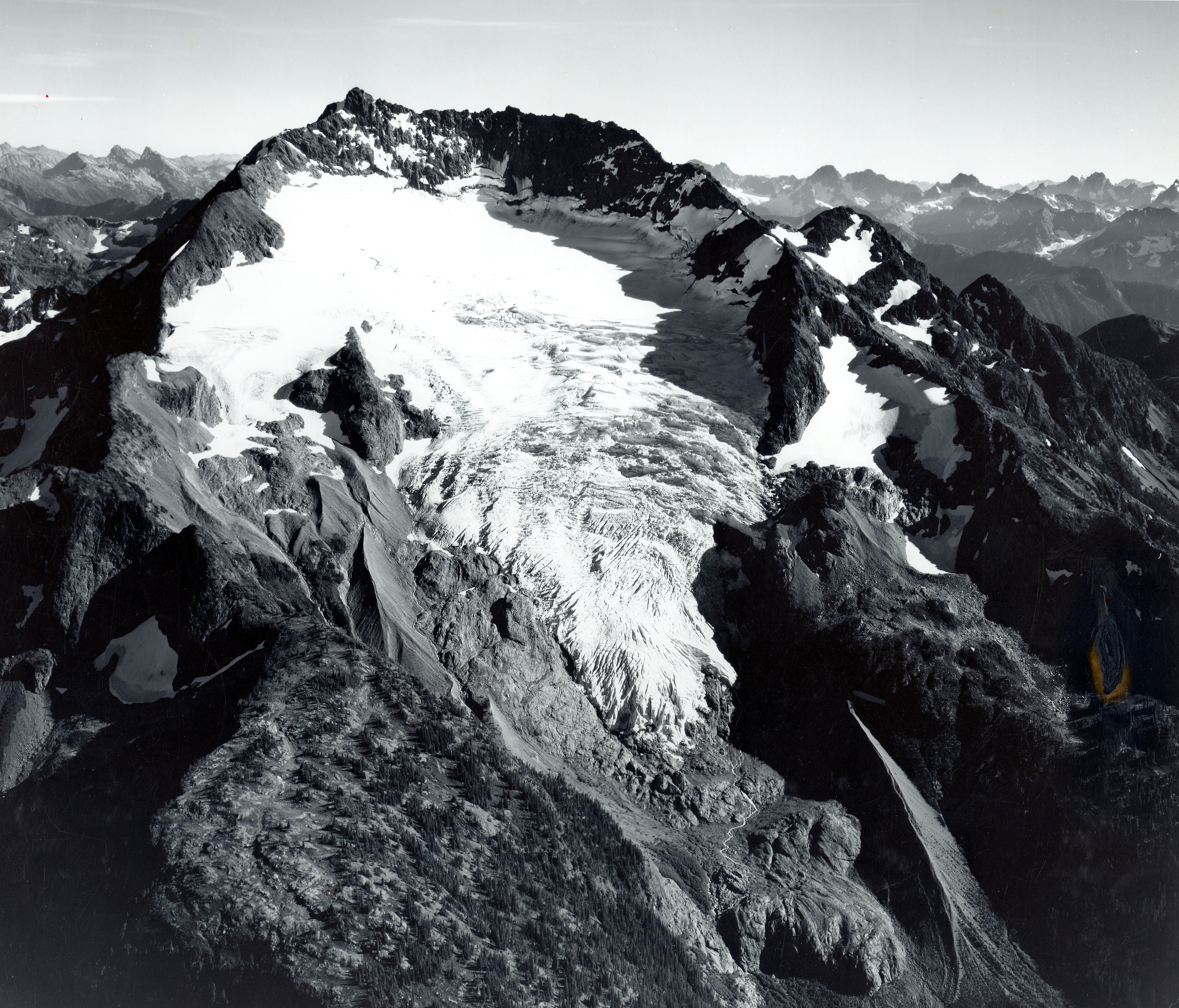
The North Cascades are heavily eroded by glaciers

The deep canyons and sharp peaks of today's North Cascades scene are products of profound erosion. Running water has etched out the grain of the range, landslides have softened the abrupt edges, homegrown glaciers have scoured the peaks and high valleys and, during the Ice Age, the Cordilleran Ice Sheet overrode almost all the range and rearranged courses of streams. Erosion has written and still writes its own history in the mountains, but it has also revealed the complex mosaic of the bedrock.

== Coast Mountains ==
The Coast Mountains are the western range of the North American mainland cordillera, covering the Alaska Panhandle and most of coastal British Columbia. The range is approximately 1,600 km (1,000 mi) long and 200 km (120 mi) wide.

Most of the Coast Mountains are composed of granite, which is part of the Coast Plutonic Complex. This is the single largest contiguous granite outcropping in the world, which extends approximately 1,800 km (1,100 mi) in length. It is a large batholith complex. Its formation is related to subduction of the Kula and Farallon tectonic plates along the continental margin during the Jurassic-to-Eocene periods. The plutonic complex is built on unusual island arc fragments, oceanic plateaus and continental margin assemblages accreted between the Triassic and the Cretaceous periods. In addition, the Garibaldi, Meager, Cayley and Silverthrone areas are of recent volcanic origin.

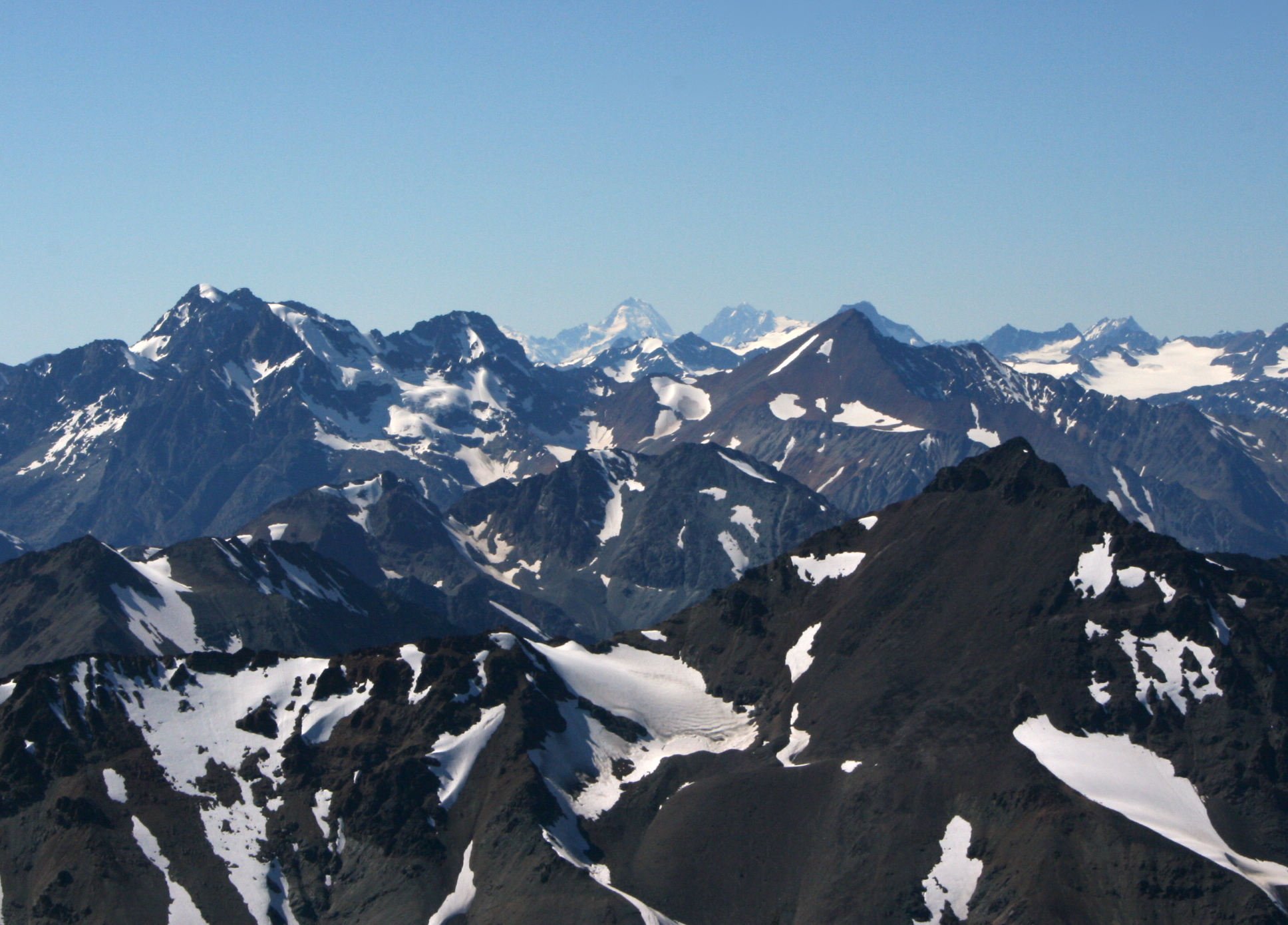
The Coast Mountains are heavily eroded by glaciers, including Mount Waddington (far background, center).

The Coast Mountains consist of a single uplifted mass. During the Pliocene period the Coast Mountains did not exist and a level peneplain extended to the sea. This mass was uplifted during the Miocene period. Rivers such as the Klinaklini River and Homathko River predate this uplift and due to erosion occurring faster than uplift, have continued to flow right up to the present day, directly across the axis of the range. The mountains flanking the Homathko River are the highest in the Coast Mountains, and include Mount Waddington west of the river in the Waddington Range and Mount Queen Bess east of the river, adjacent to the Homathko Icefield.

The Pacific Ranges in southwestern British Columbia are the southernmost subdivision of the Coast Mountains. It has been characterized by rapid rates of uplift over the past 4 million years unlike the North Cascades and has led to relatively high rates of erosion.

== Insular Mountains ==
The Insular Mountains on the coast of British Columbia have not yet fully emerged above sea level, and Vancouver Island and Haida Gwaii are just the higher elevations of the range, which was in fact fully exposed during the last ice age when the continental shelf in this area was a broad coastal plain. Although the Coast Mountains are commonly considered to be the westernmost range of the American cordillera, the Insular Mountains are the true westernmost range. Through the most recent ice age about 18,000 years ago, ice enclosed nearly all of the mountains. Glaciers that ran down to the Pacific Ocean sharpened the valley faces and eroded their bottoms.

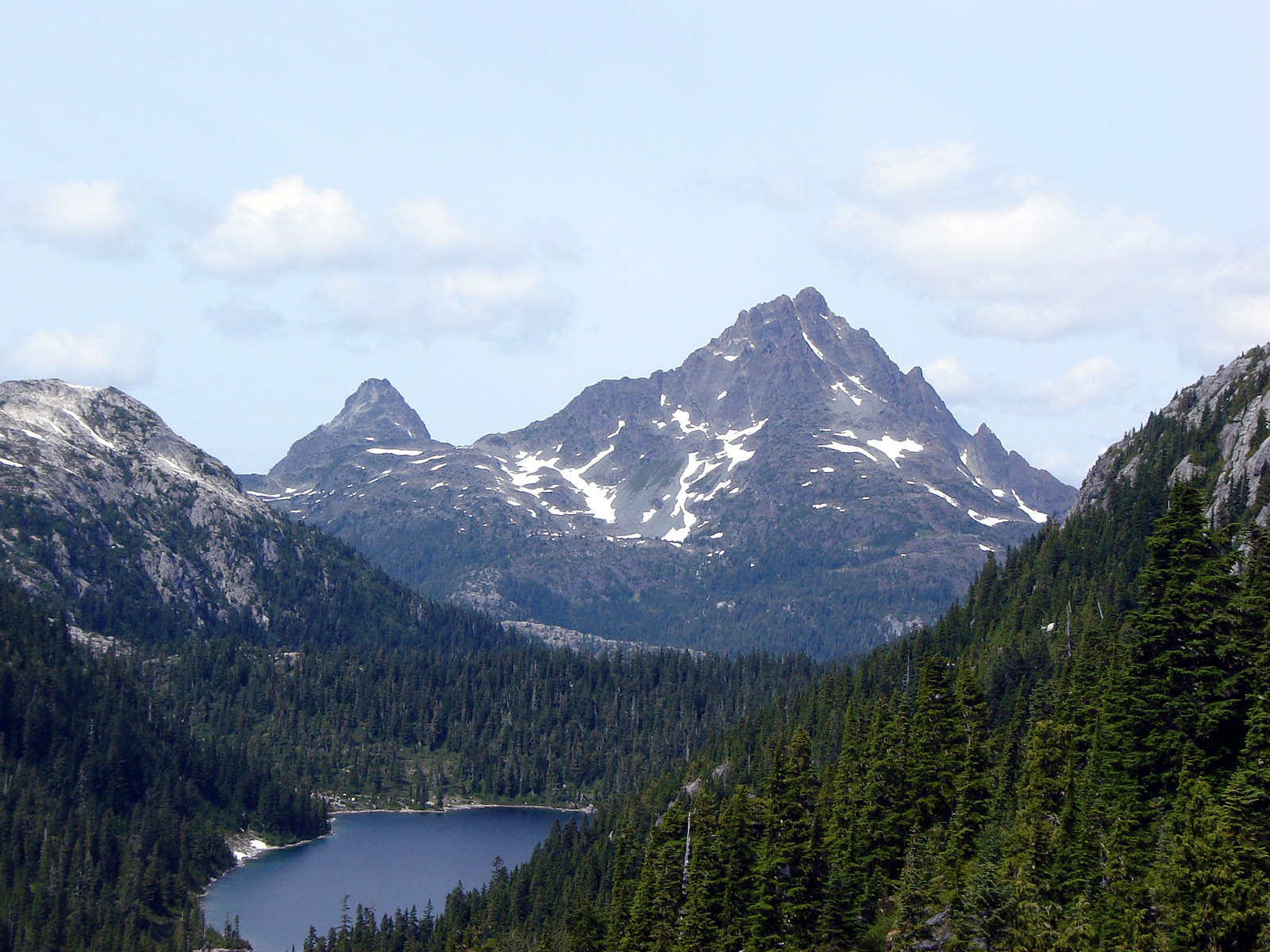
The Golden Hinde on Vancouver Island was formed by erosion carving into basalt.

The Insular Mountains were formed when a large island arc, called the Insular Islands, collided against North America during the Mid-Cretaceous period. The mountains are made of turbidite and pillow lavas unlike the plutons of the Coast Plutonic Complex that make the Coast Mountains. The Insular Mountains have much seismic activity, with the Juan de Fuca Plate subducting at the Cascadia subduction zone and the Pacific Plate sliding along the Queen Charlotte Fault. Large earthquakes have led to collapsing mountains, landslides, and the development of fissures. Flood basalts on Vancouver Island form a geologic formation called the Karmutsen Formation, which is perhaps the thickest accreted section of an oceanic plateau worldwide, exposing up to 6,000 m (20,000 ft) of basal sediment-sill complexes, basaltic to picritic pillow lavas, pillow breccia, and thick, massive basalt flows.

== See also ==
- Beaverhead impact structure, Idaho
- Cascade Range
  - Outline of the Cascade Range
- Cascade Volcanoes
- Cascadia subduction zone
- Challis Arc
- Columbia River Basalt Group
- Fort Rock
- Garibaldi Volcanic Belt
- Geology of British Columbia
- Geology of North America
- Geology of the Lassen volcanic area
- Hole-in-the-Ground
- List of volcanoes in Canada
- Olympic–Wallowa Lineament
- Puget Sound faults
- Siletzia
- Volcanology of Canada
