= Lava Fork =

Location
- Country: Canada, United States
- Province/State: British Columbia, Alaska

Physical characteristics
- Mouth: Blue River (Alaska)
  - location: Ketchikan Gateway Borough, Alaska
  - coordinates: 56°18′48″N 130°51′55″W

Lava Fork is a creek in northwestern British Columbia, Canada and the Alaska Panhandle, United States. It lies west of the Unuk River and northwest of Stewart. It flows south from the Lava Lakes across the British Columbia-Alaska border into the Blue River in the extreme northern part of Misty Fjords National Monument.

The Volcano, a cinder cone about 5 km (3.1 mi) north of the British Columbia-Alaska border in northwestern British Columbia, is the source for lava flows that overwhelm the Canadian and American sides of the creek, hence the creek's name.

== See also ==
- Iskut volcanic field
- Northern Cordilleran Volcanic Province
- List of volcanoes in Canada
- List of Northern Cordilleran volcanoes
- Volcanism of Canada
- Volcanism of Western Canada
- Lava Forks Provincial Park
- Misty Fjords National Monument
