= Lava Forks Provincial Park =

Provincial park in British Columbia, Canada

- IUCN category III (natural monument or feature)
- Location within British Columbia
- Interactive map of Lava Forks Provincial Park
- Location: Kitimat-Stikine, British Columbia, Canada
- Nearest city: Telegraph Creek
- Coordinates: 56°27′00″N 130°54′00″W
- Area: 7,463 ha (28.81 sq mi)
- Established: January 25, 2001
- Governing body: BC Parks

Lava Forks Provincial Park is a provincial park in northern British Columbia, Canada. It is the site of Canada's most recent volcanic eruption, which occurred around 1904 at Lava Fork (see The Volcano).

This park lies within the traditional territory of the Tahltan Nation.

== Recreation and tourism ==
The park is offers spectacular scenery, with especially unique volcanic landforms and features from the 1904 eruption of The Volcano. These features include lava-dammed lakes, ash dunes, pot holes containing crystal clear pools, and lava flows.

Walk-In/Backcountry/Wilderness Camping is permitted.

Fishing and angling is permitted provided the angler has the appropriate licenses.

== Location and access ==
The park is only accessible by helicopter. Foot access is possible, but requires multiple days of hiking. There is no water or road access to the park. It is located about 120 km southwest from the Telegraph Creek community.

The southern boundary of this park United States-Canada border, and is adjacent to the Tongass National Forest in Alaska.

== See also ==
- Border Lake Provincial Park
- Craig Headwaters Protected Area
- Volcanism of Western Canada
