= The Monument (British Columbia) =

Coordinates: 56°45′49″N 131°19′37″W

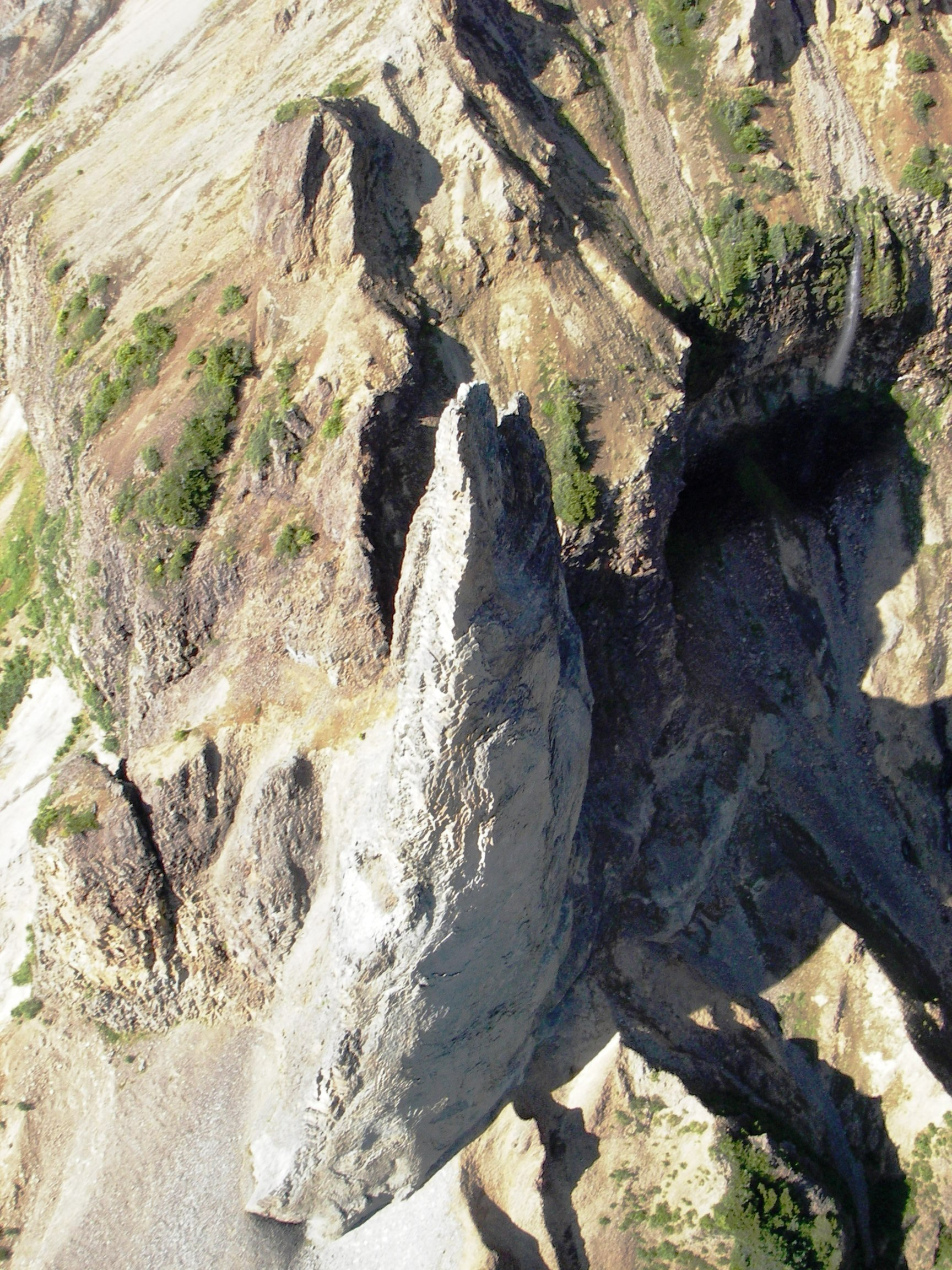
The Monument

The Monument is a hoodoo in Cassiar Land District of the Northern Interior of British Columbia, Canada. It lies on the southwestern side of Hoodoo Mountain, a flat-topped stratovolcano in the Northern Cordilleran Volcanic Province. This light grey, needle-like rock formation has an elevation of about 1,100 m (3,600 ft) and rises more than 100 m (330 ft) high, gradually decreasing in diameter to a very sharp point. It is slightly oval in cross-section and stands out against the volcanic rocks comprising Hoodoo Mountain.

The Monument contains horizontal columnar jointing and is the eroded remains of a volcanic vent that was probably active between 40,000–30,000 years ago. However, the amount of lava supplied by The Monument was probably small compared to the main vents now buried beneath Hoodoo's ice cap. It was fed by a dike that intrudes Slide Canyon on the southwestern side of Hoodoo Mountain. The surface of The Monument peels off like the layers of an onion, resulting in the creation of a light grey talus deposit at its base. The Monument has been described as a lava spine or a volcanic neck.

The Monument is a local name that has not been officially approved by the Geographical Names Board of Canada.
