= Lava Lakes =

Group of lakes in British Columbia, Canada

- Location within British Columbia
- Location: British Columbia
- Coordinates: 56°26′N 130°54′W
- Primary outflows: Lava Fork
- Basin countries: Canada

The Lava Lakes are a group of small lakes at the head of Lava Fork in the Boundary Ranges of northwestern British Columbia, Canada.

The Volcano, a cinder cone about 5 km (3.1 mi) north of the British Columbia-Alaska border above the eastern shore of the Lava Lakes, is the source for lava flows that overwhelm the lakes. These lava flows dam and form the lakes, hence giving their name.

== See also ==
- List of lakes of British Columbia
- Lava Lake (British Columbia)
