= Crow Lagoon =

Mountain in Canada

Highest point
- Elevation: 335 m (1,099 ft)
- Coordinates: 54.70°N 130.23°W

Geography
- Location: British Columbia, Canada
- Parent range: Pacific Coast Ranges

Geology
- Rock age: Holocene
- Mountain type: Pyroclastic cone
- Last eruption: Unknown

Crow Lagoon is a little-known volcanic center located north of Prince Rupert, British Columbia, Canada. There are beds of thick, basaltic tephra that are of Holocene age.

Crow Lagoon is one of the top 10 volcanoes in Canada with recent seismic activity, the others include: Castle Rock, Mount Edziza volcanic complex, Mount Cayley, Hoodoo Mountain, The Volcano, Silverthrone Mountain, Mount Meager massif, Wells Gray-Clearwater volcanic field and Mount Garibaldi.

== See also ==
- List of volcanoes in Canada
- List of Northern Cordilleran volcanoes
- Northern Cordilleran Volcanic Province
- Volcanism of Canada
- Volcanism of Western Canada
