= Castle Rock (volcano) =

Volcanic mountain in British Columbia, Canada

- Location within British Columbia
- Interactive map of Castle Rock

Highest point
- Elevation: 1,862 m (6,109 ft)
- Prominence: 55 m (180 ft)
- Coordinates: 57°50′24.0″N 130°12′29.2″W

Geography
- Location: Stikine Country, British Columbia, Canada
- District: Cassiar Land District
- Parent range: Klastline Plateau (south-central Stikine Plateau)
- Topo map: NTS 104G16 Klastline River

Geology
- Rock age: Pleistocene
- Mountain type: Volcanic plug
- Volcanic zone: Northern Cordilleran Volcanic Province
- Last eruption: Pleistocene

Castle Rock is a volcanic plug located 13 km (8 mi) west of Iskut and 8 km (5 mi) northwest of Tuktsayda Mountain in British Columbia, Canada. Castle Rock is part of the Pacific Ring of Fire that includes over 160 active volcanoes and is in the Klastline Group of the Northern Cordilleran Volcanic Province and last erupted in the Pleistocene.

Castle Rock is one of ten major Canadian volcanoes with recent seismic activity, the others being the Mount Edziza volcanic complex, Mount Cayley, Hoodoo Mountain, The Volcano, Crow Lagoon, Silverthrone Mountain, the Mount Meager massif, the Wells Gray-Clearwater volcanic field and Mount Garibaldi.

== See also ==
- Northern Cordilleran Volcanic Province
- List of volcanoes in Canada
- List of Northern Cordilleran volcanoes
- Volcanism in Canada
- Volcanism of Western Canada
- Volcanic history of the Northern Cordilleran Volcanic Province
