= Iskut volcanic field =

Group of volcanoes and lava flows in Canada and the U.S.

- Location within British Columbia

Highest point
- Peak: Cinder Mountain
- Elevation: 1,914 m (6,280 ft)
- Coordinates: 56°33′53″N 130°37′35″W

Geography
- Countries: Canada and United States
- Provinces/States: British Columbia and Alaska
- District: Cassiar Land District
- Parent range: Boundary Ranges
- Topo map(s): NTS 104B7 Unuk River; NTS 104B10 Snippaker Creek; NTS 104B14 Hoodoo Mountain

Geology
- Rock age: Pleistocene-to-Holocene
- Mountain type: Volcanic field
- Volcanic zone: Northern Cordilleran Province
- Last eruption: 1904 (uncertain)

The Iskut volcanic field is a group of volcanoes and lava flows on and adjacent to the Alaska–British Columbia border in the Boundary Ranges of the Coast Mountains. All the volcanoes in this volcanic field are situated in British Columbia along the Iskut and Unuk rivers and their tributaries, with lava flows having reached Alaska. The oldest volcanoes in the Iskut volcanic field are Little Bear Mountain and Hoodoo Mountain, which are 146,000 and 85,000 years old, respectively. Younger volcanic centres include Second Canyon, King Creek, Tom MacKay Creek, Snippaker Creek, Iskut Canyon, Cone Glacier, Cinder Mountain and Lava Fork, all of which formed in the last 70,000 years. All of the volcanoes are mafic in composition except for Hoodoo Mountain which consists of peralkaline rocks. The latest volcanic eruption took place from the Lava Fork volcano in 1800, although an uncertain 1904 eruption is also attributed to this volcano.

The name Iskut-Unuk River Cones is a nearly synonymous term for this volcanic field but it omits Hoodoo Mountain and Little Bear Mountain, the oldest volcanoes comprising the Iskut volcanic field. The name for this area in the Tlingit language is Séxkhulé, referring to the time of Aan Galakhú (the World Flood) when people took refuge here from the rising flood waters.

== See also ==
- List of Northern Cordilleran volcanoes
- List of volcanoes in Canada
- List of volcanic fields
- Volcanism of Western Canada
