= Border Lake Provincial Park =

Provincial park in British Columbia, Canada

- IUCN category II (national park)
- Location within British Columbia
- Interactive map of Border Lake Provincial Park
- Location: Cassiar Land District, British Columbia, Canada
- Nearest city: Wrangell, AK
- Coordinates: 56°21′17″N 130°42′46″W
- Area: 814 ha (2,010 acres)
- Established: January 25, 2001
- Governing body: BC Parks

Border Lake Provincial Park is a provincial park in British Columbia, Canada, located on the right (west) bank of the Unuk River and extending from that river's crossing of the Canada–United States border upstream.
