= Snippaker Creek Cone =

Cinder cone in British Columbia, Canada

Coordinates: 56.63°N 130.87°W

Snippaker Creek Cone is a cinder cone of the Iskut-Unuk River Cones group in northwestern British Columbia, Canada, located near the western flank of Cinder Mountain. It last erupted during the Holocene epoch.

== See also ==
- List of volcanoes in Canada
- List of Northern Cordilleran volcanoes
- Volcanology of Canada
- Volcanology of Western Canada
