= Little Bear Mountain =

Volcano in British Columbia, Canada

- Location within British Columbia
- Interactive map of Little Bear Mountain

Highest point
- Elevation: 1,181 m (3,875 ft)
- Coordinates: 56°48′N 131°18′W

Geography
- Location: Stikine Country, British Columbia, Canada
- District: Cassiar Land District
- Parent range: Boundary Ranges
- Topo map: NTS 104B14 Hoodoo Mountain

Geology
- Rock age: Pleistocene
- Mountain type: Tuya
- Last eruption: Pleistocene

Little Bear Mountain is a basaltic Pleistocene age tuya in the Boundary Ranges of the Coast Mountains that adjoins Hoodoo Mountain to the north. Little Bear Mountain is part of the Northern Cordilleran Volcanic Province.

== See also ==
- List of volcanoes in Canada
- List of Northern Cordilleran volcanoes
- Volcanism of Canada
- Volcanism of Western Canada
