= Tom MacKay Creek Cone =

Volcano in British Columbia, Canada

Tom MacKay Creek Cone is a basalt subglacial mound in northwestern British Columbia, Canada. It is part of the Iskut-Unuk River Cones group and last erupted during the Pleistocene epoch. There is a single vent and a single flow of weathered, fragmented pillow basalt that has a maximum thickness of 30 m (98 ft).

== See also ==
- List of volcanoes in Canada
- List of Northern Cordilleran volcanoes
- Volcanism of Canada
- Volcanism of Western Canada
