= Cinder Mountain =

Partly eroded volcano in British Columbia, Canada

Highest point
- Elevation: 1,880 m (6,170 ft)
- Coordinates: 56.57°N 130.61°W

Geography
- Location: British Columbia, Canada
- Parent range: Boundary Ranges

Geology
- Volcanic field: Iskut volcanic field

Cinder Mountain is a partially eroded volcano in British Columbia, Canada, located at the head of Snippaker Creek. It is one of the Iskut-Unuk River Cones and was the source of a 4 km (2.5 mi) long lava flow. The lava flow is basaltic in composition and terminated in Copper King Creek to the north where it overlies alpine moraine. Cinder Mountain consists mainly of ice-contact deposits that are mostly in the form of hyaloclastites and pillow lavas. It has been described as a subglacial mound or a composite cone. Volcanism at Cinder Mountain may have occurred during the Pleistocene or within the last 8,780 years. The mountain has an elevation of 1,880 m (6,170 ft).

== See also ==
- List of volcanoes in Canada
- List of Northern Cordilleran volcanoes
- Northern Cordilleran Volcanic Province
- The Volcano
- Volcanism of Canada
- Volcanism of Western Canada
