= Cone Glacier Volcano =

Cinder cone in Canada

Coordinates: 49.969°N 122.999°W

Cone Glacier Volcano is a cinder cone in the Boundary Ranges of the Coast Mountains in northwestern British Columbia, Canada. It is part of the Iskut-Unuk River Cones group and last erupted during the Holocene period. Cone Glacier contains two arms that surround the volcano.

== See also ==
- List of volcanoes in Canada
- List of Northern Cordilleran volcanoes
- Volcanic history of the Northern Cordilleran Volcanic Province
- Volcanism of Canada
- Volcanism of Western Canada
