= Second Canyon Cone =

Mountain in Canada

Highest point
- Elevation: 300 m (980 ft)
- Coordinates: 56.41°N 130.72°W

Geography
- Location: British Columbia, Canada
- Parent range: Boundary Ranges

Geology
- Rock age: Holocene
- Mountain type: Volcanic plug
- Volcanic zone: Northern Cordilleran Volcanic Province
- Volcanic field: Iskut volcanic field
- Last eruption: Holocene

Second Canyon Cone, also called Canyon Creek Cone is a cinder cone in the Boundary Ranges of the Coast Mountains in northwestern British Columbia, Canada. It is a volcanic feature of the Iskut-Unuk River Cones which is part of the Northern Cordilleran Volcanic Province and formed in the past 10,000 years of the Holocene epoch.

== See also ==
- List of volcanoes in Canada
- List of Northern Cordilleran volcanoes
- Volcanism of Canada
- Volcanism of Western Canada
