= Iskut Canyon Cone =

Cinder cone in British Columbia, Canada

Coordinates: 56.5829°N 130.5499°W

Iskut Canyon Cone, also known as Iskut River Cone, is a cinder cone of the Iskut volcanic field in northwestern British Columbia, Canada, located on the steep southern flank of the Iskut valley near its junction with Forrest Kerr Creek. It last erupted during the Holocene epoch.

== See also ==
- List of volcanoes in Canada
- List of Northern Cordilleran volcanoes
- Volcanism of Canada
- Volcanism of Western Canada
