= Canadian National Seismograph Network =

Earthquake detection system in Canada

The Canadian National Seismograph Network (CNSN) is a network of seismographs to detect earthquakes across Canada. It is operated by Natural Resources Canada and consists of approximately 150 seismic stations. More than 100 of these stations are equipped with both weak-motion seismometers and strong motion accelerometers, while the remainder have only weak-motion seismometers. While initial, analogue stations began operation in 1898, the network became digital in 1975.

Information on stations' locations and operations can be found on the CNSN Station Book.

Natural Resources Canada operates, separately, a network of over 300 specialized sensors used by the Canadian Earthquake Early Warning system.
