= King Creek Cone =

Subglacial mound in Canada

King Creek Cone is a subglacial mound of the Iskut-Unuk River Cones group in northwestern British Columbia, Canada. It last erupted during the Pleistocene epoch.

== See also ==
- List of volcanoes in Canada
- List of Northern Cordilleran volcanoes
- Volcanology of Canada
- Volcanology of Western Canada
