= Unuk River =

Coordinates: 56°04′35″N 131°04′47″W

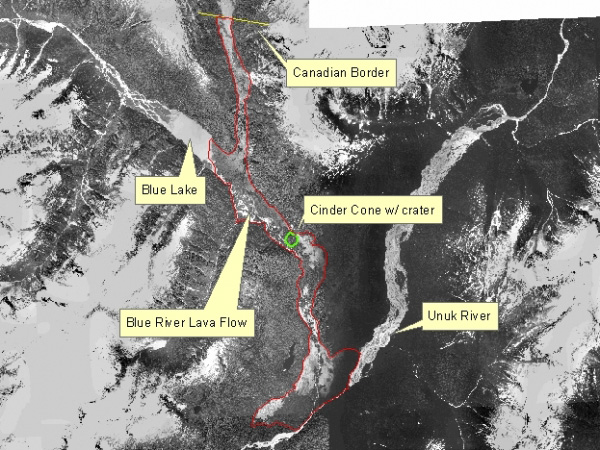
Aerial view of volcanic features of the Iskut-Unuk River volcanic center showing the Unuk River

The Unuk River is a river in the U.S. state of Alaska and the Canadian province of British Columbia. It flows from the Coast Mountains southwest to Behm Canal, northeast of Ketchikan, Alaska.

From its headwaters in a heavily glaciated area in British Columbia, south of the lower Iskut River, the Unuk flows west and south for 129 kilometres (80 mi), crossing into Alaska and emptying into Burroughs Bay, an inlet of Behm Canal. In Alaska the river flows through the Misty Fjords National Monument.

In Tlingit it is called Joonáx̱, the meaning of which is obscure but may have to do with dreaming (cf. aawajoon “he dreamed”). It is occasionally referred to as Oonáx̱, which is a reduced form. The USGS reports that a 1906 publication said the correct name for the river is “Junuk” or “Junock”, but it is unclear whether the initial sound is supposed to be an affricate [dʒ] or an approximant [j]. The former sound would reflect the full Tlingit name, the latter the English adaptation.

The Unuk River supports relatively large runs of salmon, including chinook, coho, pink, chum, and sockeye.

== See also ==
- List of rivers of British Columbia
