= Swayze greenstone belt =

The Swayze greenstone belt is a late Archean greenstone belt in northern Ontario, Canada. It is the southwestern extension of the Abitibi greenstone belt.

== See also ==
- Volcanism of Canada
- Volcanism of Eastern Canada
- List of volcanoes in Canada
- List of greenstone belts
