= Normetal caldera =

Archean era volcano in western Quebec, Canada

Coordinates: 48.3°N 79.5°W

The Normetal caldera is an Archean volcano in the Abitibi-Témiscamingue region of western Quebec, Canada. It is one of seven Archean calderas forming an alignment along the Ontario–Quebec border, all of which are within the Abitibi greenstone belt. It is bounded on the north by the 2735-million-year-old Gemini caldera and on the south by the 2730-million-year-old Hunter Mine caldera. The Normetal caldera has an age of 2725 million years, having formed by collapse of a broad subaqueous shield volcano.
