= Hunter Mine caldera =

Caldera complex in Ontario and Quebec, Canada

Coordinates: 48.691°N 79.262°W

The Hunter Mine caldera is a caldera complex in the North Volcanic Zone of the Abitibi greenstone belt in Ontario and Quebec, Canada. It is located at the eastern end of Lake Abitibi.

== See also ==
- Gemini caldera
- List of volcanoes in Canada
- Volcanism of Eastern Canada
