= Tulks Volcanic Belt =

The Tulks Volcanic Belt is a volcanic belt located in the central interior of the island of Newfoundland in the Canadian province of Newfoundland and Labrador. It contains felsic volcanic rocks and pyroclastic rocks with minor mafic and sedimentary rocks.

== See also ==
- Volcanism of Canada
- Volcanism of Eastern Canada
- List of volcanoes in Canada
