= Ecstall Greenstone Belt =

The Ecstall Greenstone Belt is a north-northwest trending greenstone belt in northwestern British Columbia, Canada. It is located in the Kitimat Ranges of the Coast Mountains between the communities of Prince Rupert and Kitimat, in the vicinity of the Ecstall River. This 80 km (50 mi) long and 3 to 20 km (1.9 to 12.4 mi) wide geologic feature forms a small portion of the 2,000 km (1,200 mi) long Central Gneiss Complex, which ranges from Proterozoic-to-Paleozoic age. Metavolcanic and metasedimentary rocks, as well as quartzite and layered gneiss comprise the Ecstall Greenstone Belt.

== See also ==
- List of greenstone belts
