= Selbaie caldera =

Archean era volcano in western Quebec, Canada

Coordinates: 48.3°N 79.5°W

The Selbaie caldera is an Archean volcano in the Abitibi-Témiscamingue region of western Quebec, Canada. It is the northernmost of seven Archean calderas forming an alignment along the Ontario–Quebec border, all of which are within the Abitibi greenstone belt. It has an age of 2728 million years and is bounded on the south by the 2735-million-year-old Gemini caldera. Selbaie is a rare example of an Archean caldera that evolved from volcanism in subaqueous to subaerial environments. It contains a 1,200 m (3,900 ft) thick intracaldera sequence of debris flows, pumiceous tuff and densely welded ignimbrite. A central intrusion, known as the Brouillan tonalite, may be the remains of a resurgent dome. The southwestern flank of this intrusion contains locally massive sulfide, epithermal veins and regionally extensive and temporally early exhalite.
