= Hunt River =

Hunt River may refer to:

- Hunt River (Alaska), Northwest Arctic Borough, Alaska
- Hunt River (Rhode Island)
- Hunt River greenstone belt
