= List of greenstone belts =

This is a list of greenstone belts

== Africa ==
=== Burkina Faso ===
- Hounde greenstone belt
- Boromo greenstone belt

=== Democratic Republic of the Congo ===
- Kilo-Moto

=== Angola ===
- Lufico - Cabinda
- Cassinga

=== South Africa ===
- Barberton greenstone belt
- Pietersberg greenstone belt

=== Tanzania ===
- Kilimafedha greenstone belt
- Lake Victoria Greenstone Belt
- Nzega Greenstone Belt

=== Zimbabwe ===
- Belingwe Greenstone Belt
- Gweru-Shurugwi Greenstone Belt
- Harare greenstone belt
- Bindura-Shamva greenstone belt
- Wedza Greenstone belt
- Bulawayo-Bubi Greenstone belt
- Makaha Greenstone Belt
- Beatrice Greenstone Belt
- Dindi Greenstone Belt
- Mt Darwin Greenstone Belt

== Eurasia ==
=== Russia ===
- Kostomuksha greenstone belt

=== Finland ===
- Central Lapland Greenstone Belt (Lapland)
- Tipasjärvi-Kuhmo-Suomussalmi greenstone belt

=== Norway ===
- Mauken greenstone belt

== Oceania ==
- Harris greenstone belt (Australia)
- Jack Hills greenstone belt (Australia)
- Norseman-Wiluna greenstone belt (Australia)
- Saddleback greenstone belt (Australia)
- Southern Cross greenstone belt (Australia)
- Yandal greenstone belt (Australia)
- Yalgoo-Singleton greenstone belt (Australia)

== North America ==
=== Canada ===
- Abitibi greenstone belt (Quebec/Ontario)
- Bird River greenstone belt (Manitoba)
- Ecstall Greenstone Belt (British Columbia)
- Ennadai greenstone belt (Saskatchewan)
- Flin Flon greenstone belt (Manitoba/Saskatchewan)
- Hope Bay greenstone belt (Nunavut)
- Hunt River greenstone belt (Newfoundland and Labrador)
- Nuvvuagittuq Greenstone Belt (Quebec)
- Red Lake greenstone belt (Ontario)
- Rice Lake greenstone belt (Manitoba)
- Swayze greenstone belt (Ontario)
- Temagami Greenstone Belt (Ontario)
- Yellowknife greenstone belt (Northwest Territories)

=== Greenland ===
- Isua greenstone belt (Southwestern Greenland)

=== United States ===
- Elmers Rock greenstone belt (Wyoming)
- Rattlesnake Hills greenstone belt (Wyoming)
- Seminoe Mountains greenstone belt (Wyoming)
- South Pass greenstone belt (Wyoming)

== South America ==
=== Brazil ===
- Santa Rita greenstone belt

=== Venezuela, Guyana, Suriname, French Guiana, Brazil ===
- Northern Guiana Shield greenstone belt
