= Saattopora Mine =

Former Cu-Au Mine in North Finland

The Saattopora Copper-Gold Mine is located in Kittilä and was active from 1988 to 1995 while it was owned by Outokumpu. The mine produced 6,279 kg of gold and 5,177 tonnes of copper. The mine exploited a Paleoproterozoic orogenic gold deposit as part of the broader Central Lapland Greenstone Belt (CLGB).

The site lies within the Katajavaara and Aakenus project areas which are held by Cullen Finland Oy, A Finnish subsidiary of Cullen Resources established in 2016. The Katajarvaara permit was obtained in 2019, while the Aakenus permit was acquired in 2021. In August, 2021, Capella Minerals announced an earn-in agreement under which it acquired a 70% interest, with Cullen Resources retaining the remaining 30%.

Capella Minerals is currently exploring the project areas, with an indicated interest in the potential redevelopment and expansion of the historical mine. They performed aerial magnetic surveys in 2022, and obtained an exploration license in 2023, allowing for the use of intrusive exploration methods, such as drilling.
