= Newfoundland Ridge =

Ocean ridge in the northern Atlantic Ocean on the east coast of Canada

Coordinates: 40°4′55.5″N 48°0′0″W

The Newfoundland Ridge is an ocean ridge in the northern Atlantic Ocean, located on the east coast of Canada. It was the site for major volcanic activity in the Barremian–Aptian period.

== See also ==
- Volcanism of Canada
- Volcanism of Eastern Canada
