= Nuvvuagittuq Greenstone Belt =

Geologic sequence in Quebec, Canada

Coordinates: 58°18′N 077°45′W

- Stratigraphic range: Eoarchean–Hadean (disputed)
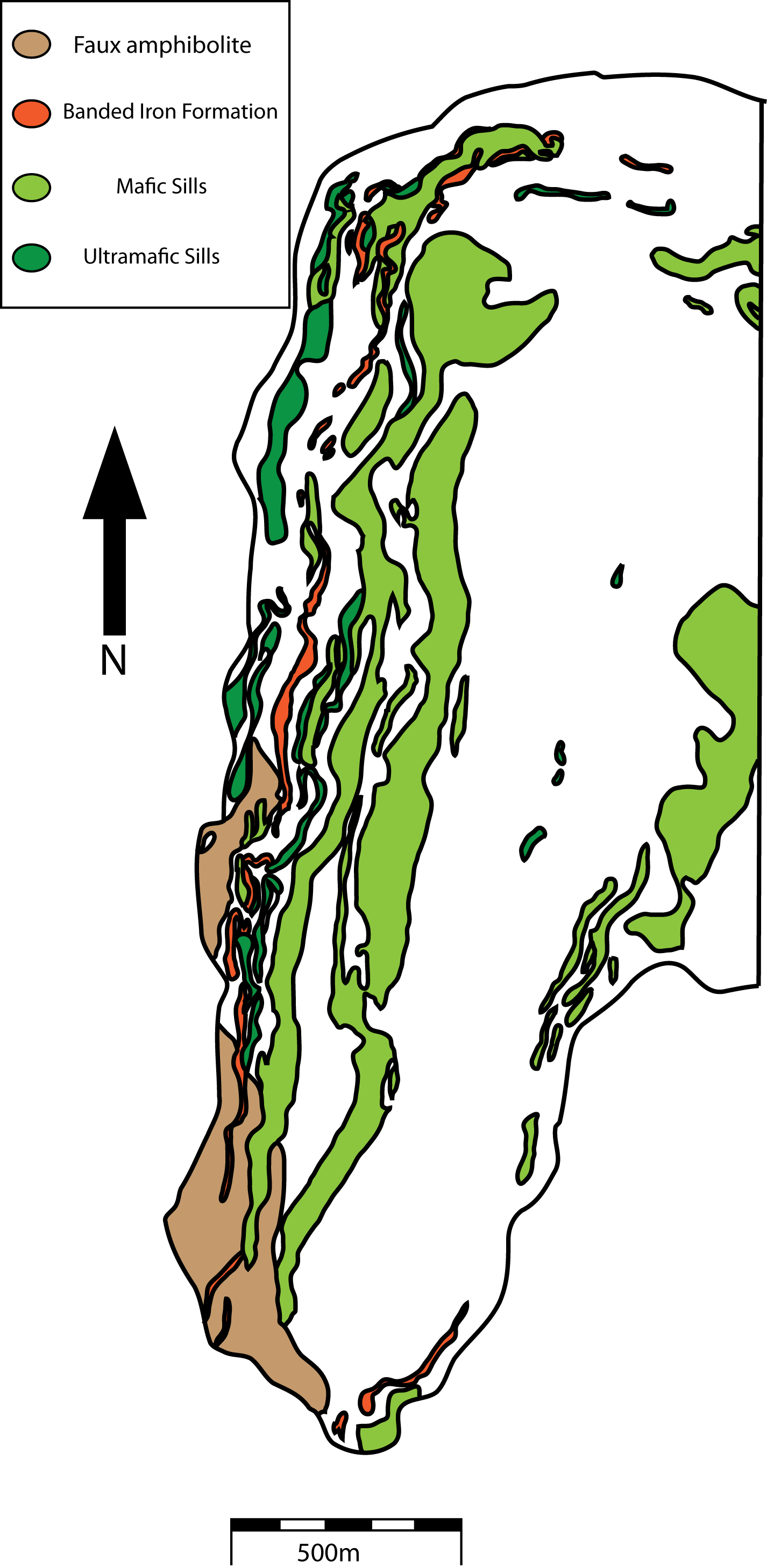
- A map showing geological formations in the Nuvvuagittuq Greenstone Belt
- Type: Geological formation
- Area: Approx. 20 km^{2} (7.7 mi^{2})

Location
- Coordinates: 58°17'18"N 77°36'42"W
- Region: Northern Quebec
- Country: Canada

The Nuvvuagittuq Greenstone Belt (NGB; Inuktitut: [nuv.vu.a.git.tuq]) is a sequence of metamorphosed mafic to ultramafic volcanic and associated sedimentary rocks (a greenstone belt) located on the eastern shore of Hudson Bay, 40 km southeast of Inukjuak, Quebec. These rocks have undergone extensive metamorphism, and represent some of the oldest surface rocks on Earth.

The age of the Nuvvuagittuq Greenstone Belt is still subject to debate. One 2007 paper gave an age of c. 3,750 million years (Ma), while another in 2012 gave an age of c. 4,388 Ma. Research published in June 2025 established an age of 4157 Ma for a gabbroic dike cross-cutting the Ujaraaluk unit.

In March 2017, a published report gave evidence for fossils of microorganisms in these rocks, which would be the oldest trace of life yet discovered on Earth. However, these traces may be abiogenic.

== History and geography ==
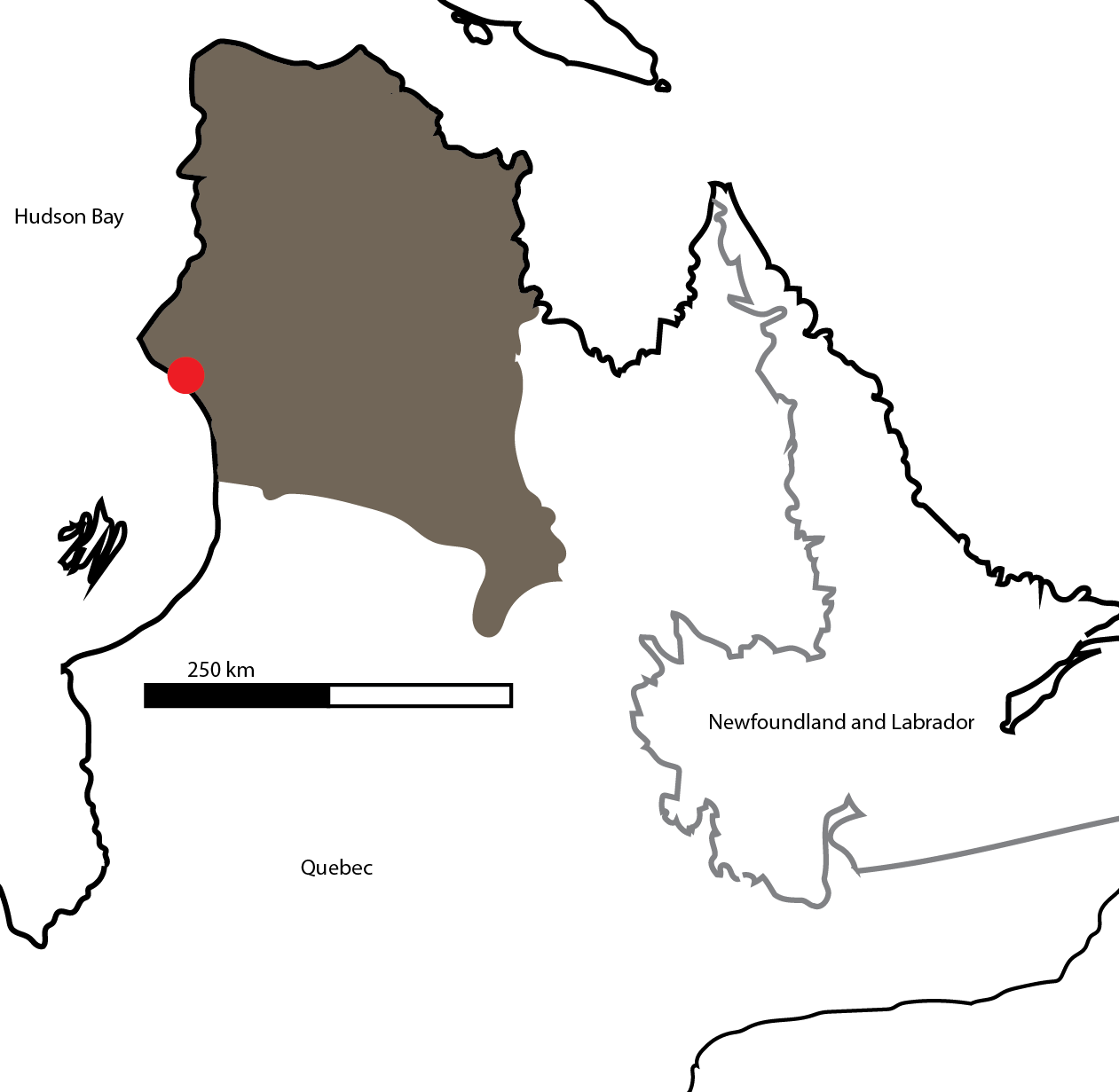
The location of the NGB shown in red

Formerly called the Porpoise Cove Greenstone Belt, the Nuvvuagittuq Greenstone Belt was first mapped in 1965 by the Quebec Ministry of Natural Resources. The area remained more or less unexamined until the 2000s when preliminary reports of U-Pb zircon dating in the area of the belt found zircons with ages up to 3,750 Ma. Since then, the Nuvvuagittuq Greenstone Belt has become the focus of intense study. There is still considerable disagreement between scientists regarding the history and age of this structure. The Nuvvuagittuq Greenstone Belt is part of a mafic unit called the Ujaraaluk unit, both of which are in the Inukjuak subprovince of the Minto Block in North Eastern Superior Province (NESP).

In 2025, sampling permits were revoked by the local Inuit tribe who lives in the area, citing damage caused by excessive sampling.

=== Age controversy ===
In 2007, the Nuvvuagittuq was dated to be a minimum of 3.75 billion years old (3,750 Ma). This measurement was made using uranium–lead dating on zircons found within granitic intrusions that cut portions of the belt, and therefore, are younger than the features it cuts. This measurement is widely accepted. However, it alone does not provide a maximum age.

In 2012 samarium–neodymium dating and neodymium isotope fractionation was used to establish an age of 4321 Ma for the Nuvvuagittuq Greenstone Belt. This was accomplished by dating intruding gabbros and measuring neodymium isotope fractionation in less-deformed members of the Ujaraaluk unit. The age of 4321 Ma would make the Nuvvuagittuq Greenstone Belt the oldest known rocks on Earth.

In 2012, further studies of detrital zircons taken from quartz–biotite schists in the NGB reported a maximum age of 3,780 Ma. The latter study states that the 4,321 Ma age is not reflective of the NGB, but rather, reflects isotope ratios inherited from Hadean crust that was melted to form the parent rocks of the NGB.

Research published in June 2025 established an age of 4157 Ma for a gabbroic dike cross-cutting the Ujaraaluk unit. Based on field relationships, this would establish a minimum age for the mafic units of Nuvvuagittuq Greenstone Belt supporting the fact that they are indeed Hadean.

== Geology ==
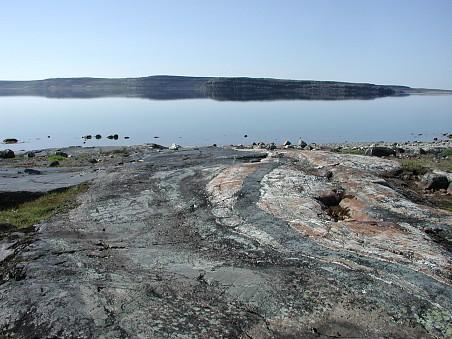
An outcrop of metamorphosed rock from Nuvvuagittuq

The Nuvvuagittuq Greenstone Belt contains 3 major components:

- Cummingtonites, metamorphic amphiboles, which form most of the belt
- Mafic and ultramafic sills that intrude the amphibolites
- Banded iron formations, sedimentary rock that formed in sea water

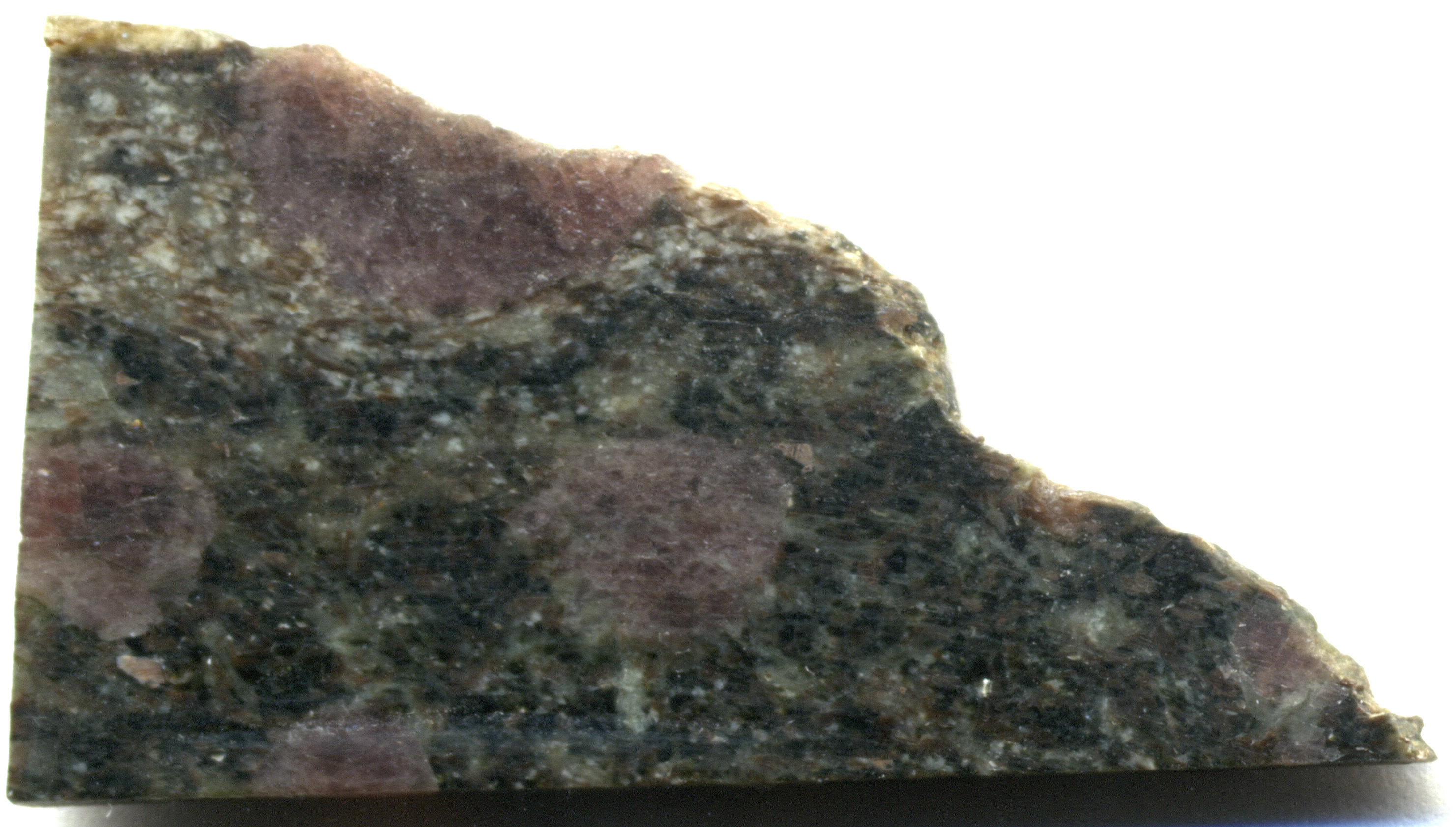
Garnet in "faux-amphibolite", Nuvvuagittuq Greenstone Belt

The cummingtonite amphibolite that dominates the belt is unusual that sections of the rock have a grayish-beige color, compared to the dark green of common amphibolites, giving it the nickname "faux-amphibolite". The cummingtonite amphibolite displays gneissic foliation, with cummingtonite, quartz, biotite and plagioclase feldspar being the primary components. The cummingtonite amphibolites range from garnet-rich to garnet-poor and are interpreted to be highly metamorphosed volcano-sedimentary rocks.

Ultramafic and gabbroic sills appear commonly on the northern portion of the belt. These sills range from 5 to 30 m (16 to 98 ft) in width, and have serpentine and talc rich interiors with amphibole rich margins. They represent a significant intrusion event in the history of the NGB.

The banded iron formation can be traced continuously across the northern portion of the belt. The formation is composed mainly of quartz, magnetite, and grunerite.

== Alteration history ==
The history of alteration and metamorphism in the Nuvvuagittuq Greenstone Belt remains poorly understood in many regards. However, attempts have been made to constrain the history using structural techniques, and geochronometric high-pressure deformation is evident throughout the belt as one of the earliest periods of deformation. This period caused significant foliation and meter-scale folding in the faux-amphibolite and banded iron formations. The work of Nadeau and O'Neil both agree on a thermal event after the first phase of deformation, and it is dated by O'Neil to be 2.7 Ga. This event is recorded by igneous intrusions in the NGB, and the formation of the nearby Boizard Suite, an intrusive igneous formation. This event is followed by a period of meter-scale folding that affects all parts of the belt.

It has also been proposed that the NGB represents a zone of paleo subduction. Similarities between the NGB and the Izu-Bonin-Mariana forearc, a modern subduction zone, suggest that the NGB may have experienced episodic subduction in its lifetime. This theory does not depend on the timing of the formation of the belt, and either ages would represent subduction occurring at a remarkable age.

== Evidence of early life ==
=== Banded iron formation ===
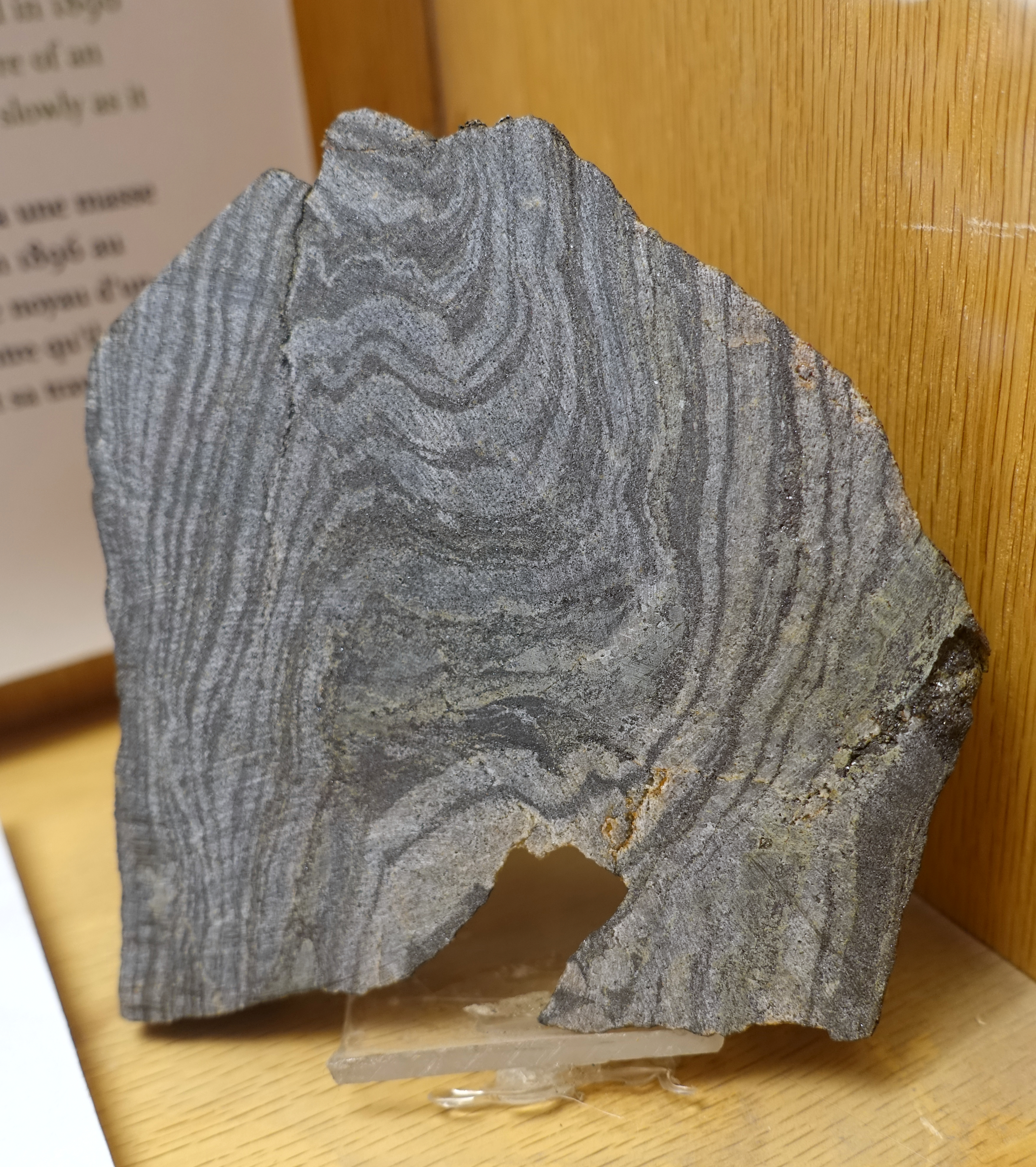
Banded iron formation found in Porpoise Cove (Nuvvuagittuq), now in Montreal, Canada

The banded iron formation bears many similarities to similar formations found in Algoma-type iron deposits. It has been suggested that Algoma-type iron deposits can precipitate due to bacterial activity in an anoxic environment, as would be found in the very early Earth. These iron formations may be one of the oldest fingerprints of life, indicating that there may have been biological activity at the time that the NGB was being formed.

=== Chert ===
A controversial paper published in March 2017 reported evidence for early life in these rocks. The paper describes putative fossilized microorganisms. The structures seen are interpreted as hematite tubes, and filaments, similar in morphology and size to those produced today by bacteria living in subsea hydrothermal vents. Several detailed microstructures, both shape and chemical makeup match modern structures. Collectively these multiple observations led the authors to conclude that they were produced by "biological activity" more than 3.77 billion years ago. This conclusion was greeted with both approval and skepticism. The authors vigorously defended their conclusions, and are confident that their conclusions will stand the test of time. It was reported in a 2019 paper that hematite tubes and filaments with the same shape and chemical makeup can be produced abiotically by chemical gardens, which may form naturally in some hydrothermal settings. A 2022 paper added that large (up to 1 cm), complex structures were present, with a central stem and parallel side branches, and ellipsoids alongside the tubules and filaments. The filaments were said to resemble filaments of Mariprofundus ferrooxydans, a deep sea siderophilic bacterium. Critics pointed out that metamorphism and the effects of a crystal lattice could account for some of the effects seen, particularly the parallel filaments.

== IUGS geological heritage site ==
In respect of having 'some of the oldest, if not the oldest, rocks on Earth, with potentially earliest traces of life', the International Union of Geological Sciences (IUGS) included the 'Hadean to Eoarchean Nuvvuagittuq greenstone belt' in its assemblage of 100 'geological heritage sites' around the world in a listing published in October 2022. The organisation defines an IUGS Geological Heritage Site as 'a key place with geological elements and/or processes of international scientific relevance, used as a reference, and/or with a substantial contribution to the development of geological sciences through history.'

== See also ==
- Earliest known life forms
- List of greenstone belts
- Oldest dated rocks
