= Rattlesnake Hills greenstone belt =

Coordinates: 42.7253°N 107.3235°W

The Rattlesnake Hills greenstone belt represents a fragment of a partially exposed synformal Archean greenstone belt within the Wyoming craton that was intruded by Cenozoic alkalic volcanics. The supracrustal belt has been subjected to multiphase deformation during the Archean and later brittle deformation during the Laramide orogeny. Ductile deformation during the Archean produced foliation, and at least three episodes of folding.

== Folding ==
The exposed core of the Rattlesnake Hills forms an Archean supracrustal belt of metasedimentary and metavolcanic rock that has been intruded by more than 40 Cenozoic alkalic plugs and dikes. Mapping by Hausel indicated that the supracrustal belt consisted of a refolded, isoclinally folded, greenstone belt fragment with a lower(?) metasedimentary unit of metapelite, quartzite, banded iron formation and amphibolite named the Barlow Springs Formation. The Barlow Springs Formation is overlain by pillowed metatholeiites of the McDougal Gulch Metavolcanics, which, in turn, is overlain by metagreywacke with intercalated metacherts of the UT Creek Formation. The northern limb of the Rattlesnake synform was not uplifted and presumably underlies the Phanerozoic sediments north of the uplift.

== Mineralization ==
At least three episodes of gold mineralization are recognized in the district. These include syngenetic stratabound exhalitive mineralization, epigenetic mineralization, and disseminated epithermal gold associated with the volcanic activity.

The presence of anomalous gold associated with the Cenozoic alkalic volcanism suggests that this region represents a favorable exploration target for low-grade, large-tonnage, gold mineralization. The greenstone belt was considered to have high potential for gold mineralization by Hausel who investigated the greenstone belt initially in 1982 and made several significant discoveries. Since 1996, several companies, the most notable at present being EVG (Evolving Gold Corp), have explored the belt finding additional gold anomalies including at least one deposit with > 1 million ounces of gold.

== See also ==
- List of greenstone belts
