= Gemini caldera =

Archean era volcano in western Quebec, Canada

Coordinates: 48.3°N 79.5°W

The Gemini caldera is an Archean volcano in the Abitibi-Témiscamingue region of western Quebec, Canada. It is one of seven Archean calderas forming an alignment along the Ontario–Quebec border, all of which are within the Abitibi greenstone belt. It is bounded on the north by the 2728-million-year-old Selbaie caldera and on the south by the 2725-million-year-old Normetal caldera. The Gemini caldera has an age of 2735 million years and is inferred to be subaerial in origin.

== See also ==
- List of volcanoes in Canada
