= Geology of Manitoba =

Overview of the geology of the Province of Manitoba

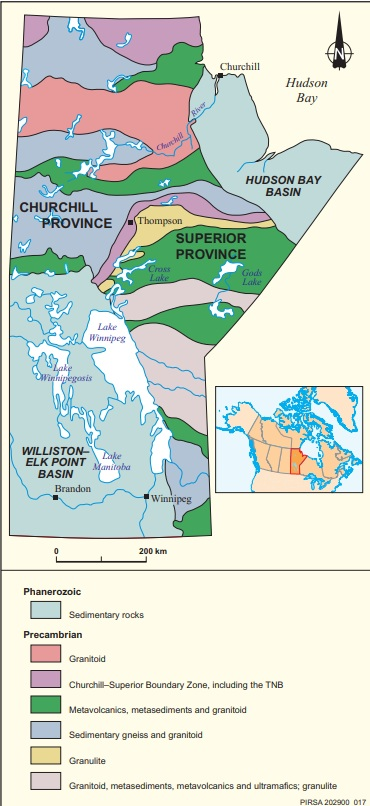
Manitoba Geologic Map

== Geologic Settings ==
The most prevalent rocks in Manitoba are Precambrian in age. These rocks are almost all igneous and metamorphic. These are divided into the Superior Province and the Churchill Province.

In central Manitoba lies the Flin Flon greenstone belt, which is one of the largest Paleoproterozoic volcanic-hosted massive sulphide districts in the world, containing 27 copper-zinc-(gold) deposits from which more than 183 million tonnes of sulphide have been mined.

There are two distinct sedimentary basins in Manitoba Located in the southwest is the Williston/Elkport basin and to the North East is the Churchill Basin.

Southwestern Manitoba is located in the Williston Basin. This Basin is best known for the Bakken formation. There are a number of oil producing formations found with in this area. Both conventional and tight oil wells.

== Notable geologic formations ==
=== Ashville Formation ===
The Ashville Formation is a geological formation in Saskatchewan and Manitoba whose strata date back to the Late Cretaceous. Dinosaur remains are among the fossils that have been recovered from the formation.

It is geochronologically equivalent to the Lower Colorado Group and the Viking Formation in central Alberta.
