= Seminoe Mountains greenstone belt =

Greenstone belt in Wyoming

Coordinates: 42.1669°N 107.0571°W

The Seminoe Mountains greenstone belt represents a fragment of an Archean greenstone terrane within the Wyoming craton. The greenstone belt was mapped by Hausel, who identified significant gold anomalies at Bradley Peak in banded iron formation, quartz veins and in a large altered zone of metabasalts. Mapping differentiated three mappable units that included the Bradley Peak metavolcanics, the Seminoe Formation and the Sunday Morning metasediments.

Mineral resources in the belt are varied, as is typical of most greenstone terranes. The mineral resources have not been explored in any great detail and indications are some deposits could be economic under favorable conditions. Lapidary and decorative stone is varied and includes several types of attractive rock including serpentinite, leopard rock, jade, jasperized banded iron formation, and copper-coated (malachite, chrysocolla, cuprite) milky quartz.

== See also ==
- List of greenstone belts
