= Hope Bay greenstone belt =

Coordinates: 68.0378°N 106.5784°W

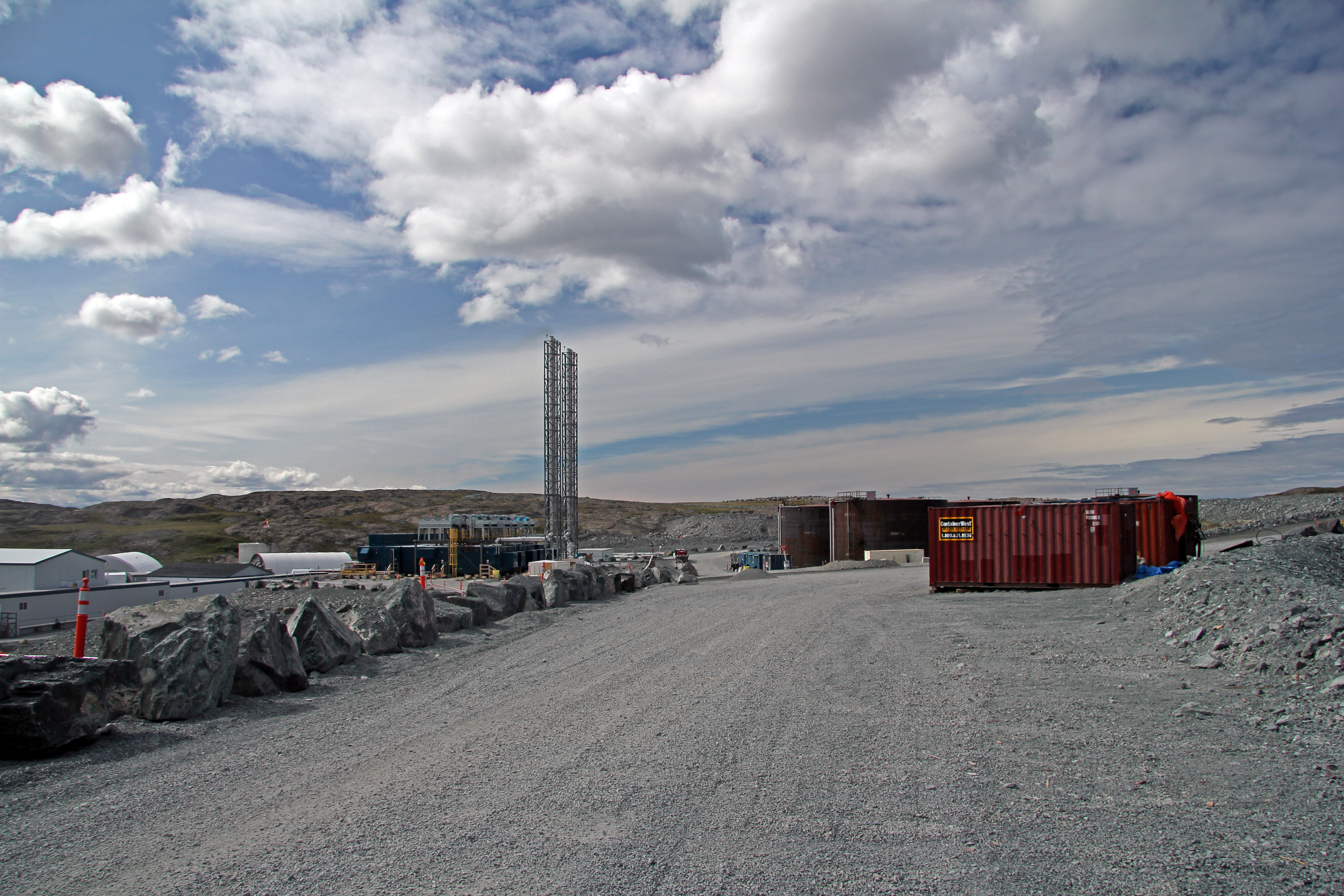
Hope Bay Gold Mine, main camp area

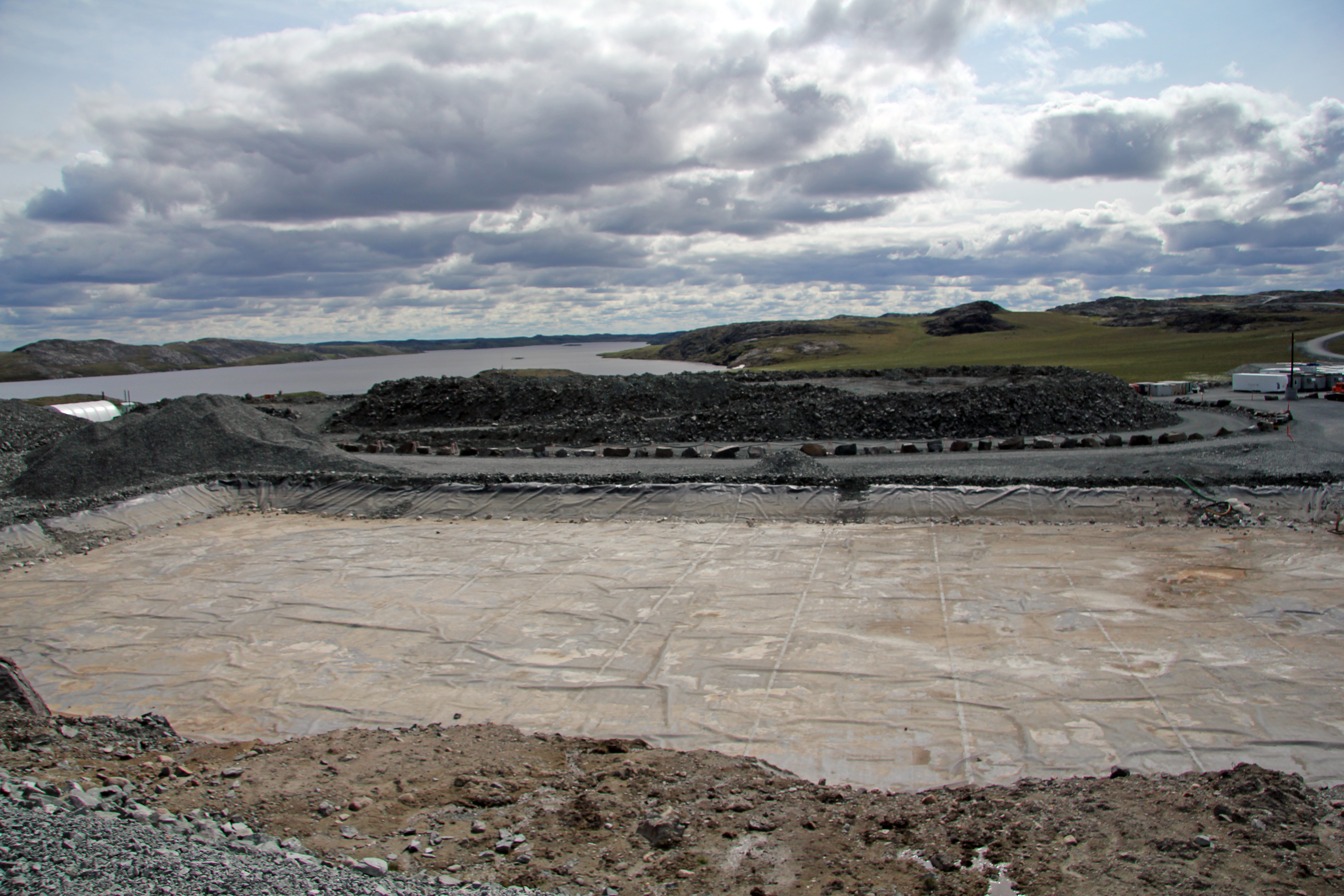
Hope Bay Gold Mine, tailing pond

The Hope Bay greenstone belt, also called the Hope Bay volcanic belt, is a 42 km (26 mi) long Archean greenstone belt in western portion of Kivalliq Region, Nunavut, Canada. It consists of mostly mafic volcanic rocks and contains three major gold deposits called Boston, Doris and Naartok.

== See also ==
- List of volcanoes in Canada
- Volcanism of Northern Canada
- List of greenstone belts
