= Shelburne dike =

Diabase dike in Nova Scotia, Canada

The Shelburne dike, also known as the Great Dike, is a large northeast-trending Mesozoic diabase dike in southwestern Nova Scotia, Canada. It is 140 km (87 mi) long, although some evidence suggests it extends a further 60 km (37 mi) to the northeast to Sambro Island. The dike may have fed volcanoes during the Triassic period when the landscape was rifting apart during the breakup of supercontinent Pangaea.

== See also ==
- Volcanism of Canada
- Volcanism of Eastern Canada
