= Flin Flon greenstone belt =

Precambrian greenstone belt (rock formation) in Canada

Coordinates: 54.77°N 101.89°W

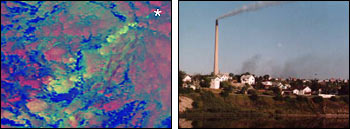
The clouds with small droplets in the left image, indicated by yellow, were seeded by the aerosols from the copper smelter in Flin Flon. Pollution is particularly noticeable from satellites in areas where the air is otherwise clean.

The Flin Flon greenstone belt, also referred to as the Flin Flon – Snow Lake greenstone belt, is a Precambrian greenstone belt located in the central area of Manitoba and east-central Saskatchewan, Canada (near Flin Flon). It lies in the central portion of the Trans-Hudson orogeny and was formed by arc volcanism during the Paleoproterozoic period.

== Economic geology ==
"The Flin Flon – Snow Lake belt is one of the most prolific mining belts in the world. A multitude of base and precious metal deposits of various sizes have been found in this relatively small area, some 250 km long and 45 km wide. There have been 25 operating mines in this area starting with the Mandy Mine, which first went into production in 1916. Most of these mines produce copper–zinc and associated precious metals, although at least three produced principally gold and silver."

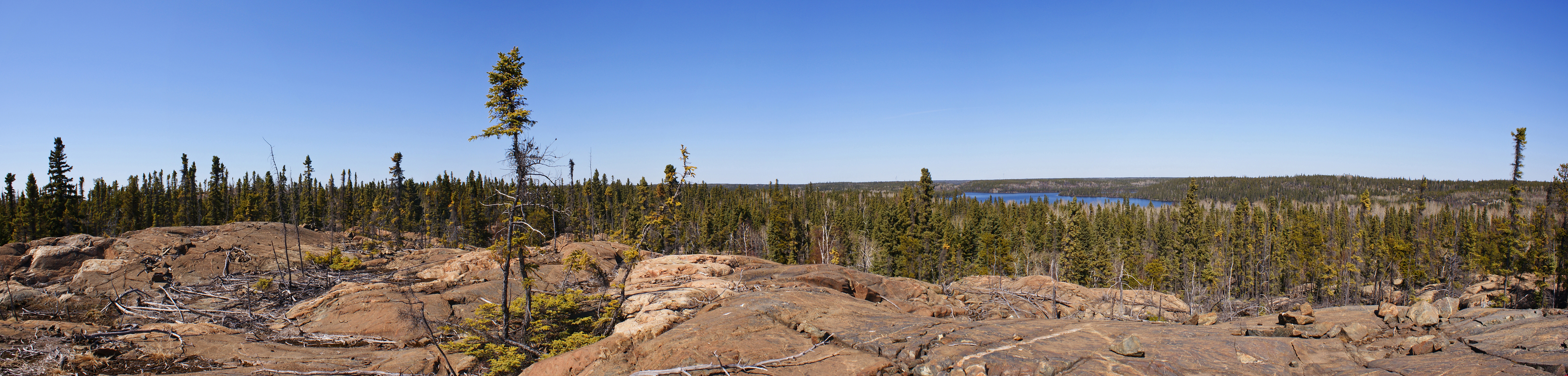
A panoramic photograph of the Flin Flon area and outcrop. Picture taken on top of pillowed andesite by Big Island Lake.

== See also ==
General topics

- Volcanism of Canada
- Volcanism of Western Canada
- Trans-Hudson orogeny
- List of greenstone belts

Canadian provincial geology

- Geography of Saskatchewan
- Geography of Manitoba
- Geology of Manitoba
