= Newfoundland Seamounts =

Group of seamounts offshore of Eastern Canada in the northern Atlantic Ocean

Coordinates: 43°41′27.9″N 45°24′15″W

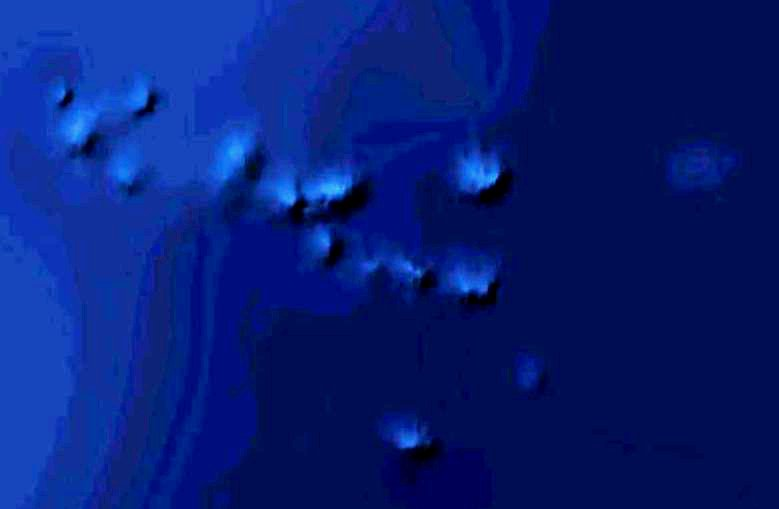
- Satellite image of the Newfoundland Seamounts

- Location within Atlantic Ocean

Location
- Location: North Atlantic Ocean
- Country: Canada

Geology
- Age of rock: Cretaceous
- Last eruption: Cretaceous

The Newfoundland Seamounts are a group of seamounts offshore of Eastern Canada in the northern Atlantic Ocean. Named for the island of Newfoundland, this group of seamounts formed during the Cretaceous period and are poorly studied.

The Newfoundland Seamounts appear to have formed as a result of the North American Plate passing over the Azores hotspot. Scruncheon Seamount in the middle of the chain has given an isotopic date of 97.7 ± 1.5 million years for the Newfoundland Seamounts. This indicates that the Newfoundland Seamounts were volcanically active in the earliest Cenomanian stage.

== Seamounts ==
The Newfoundland Seamounts include:

- Dipper Seamount
- Screech Seamount
- Shredder Seamount
- Scruncheon Seamount
- Touton Seamount

== See also ==
- Volcanism of Canada
- Volcanism of Eastern Canada
- List of volcanoes in Canada
