= Red Lake greenstone belt =

The Red Lake greenstone belt is an Archean greenstone belt at the town of Red Lake in Northwestern Ontario, Canada. It consists of basalts and komatiites ranging in age from 2,925 to 2,940 million years old and rhyolites-andesites ranging in age from 2,730 to 2,750 million years old.

== See also ==
- Volcanism in Canada
- List of greenstone belts
