= Kirkland Lake kimberlite field =

Volcanic field in Ontario, Canada

The Kirkland Lake kimberlite field is a 165 to 152 million year old kimberlite field in the Kirkland Lake area of northeastern Ontario, Canada.

== See also ==
- Volcanism of Canada
- Volcanism of Eastern Canada
- List of volcanoes in Canada
- List of volcanic fields
