= Bird River greenstone belt =

Coordinates: 50.417°N 95.596°W

The Bird River greenstone belt is an Archean greenstone belt in southeastern Manitoba, Canada.

== See also ==
- Volcanism of Canada
- Volcanism of Western Canada
- List of greenstone belts
