= Giyani Greenstone Belt =

Geological formation

Location of the Giyani Greenstone Belt in Limpopo province, South Africa.

The Giyani Greenstone Belt (GGB), also known as the Sutherland Range, is located in the Limpopo province of South Africa at the north-eastern boundary of the Kaapvaal craton. It is not as economically relevant as the Barberton greenstone belt located further south.

== Geological setting ==
The Giyani Greenstone Belt contains primarily metamorphosed volcanic and sedimentary sequences called greenstones because of the common occurrence of minerals such as chlorite, actinolite, garnet or epidote. This type of rock originally started as an ancient seafloor, which went through metamorphism under high pressure and heat. The belt is a part of the larger Limpopo Mobile Belt and is enclosed by Archean granite-greenstone terranes. The flood basalt sequence into which it flows has a very complex structure, showing evidence of multiple phases of deformation, many times stronger than the forces experienced by typical volcanic and sedimentary rocks; intrusion is also apparent in one or more igneous layers as metamorphized lain. Adjacent to the GGB is the Swazian age Goudplaats Gneiss.

The Giyani Greenstone Belt is Swazian in age and belongs to the Murchison Sequence as the Giyani Group. It follows a north–eastern direction, measuring around 70 km in length and in some parts up to 17 km in width. Characteristic outcrops are located in the Kruger National Park, with two branches in the South: the Khavagari and Lwaji Limbs.

The geological setting of the Giyani Greenstone Belt is characterised as mafic and subordinate felsic in the south. The Giyani Group is a lower ultramafic unit composed primarily of tremolite-actinolite schist and amphibolites and includes a banded iron formation (BIF) with auriferous areas. Below the ultramafic unit sedimentary and mafic-ultramafic units exist.

Gold mineralization in the Giyani Greenstone Belt occurs in four settings: quartz veins with sulfide developments, banded iron formations, quartz and sulfide replacement veins, and carbonate veins with gold being free or refractory. Free gold is found in its original state, either in the host rock or oxidized zone, and can be recovered by gravity processes. Refractory gold is found in sulfide grains, often coupled with arsenopyrite, and requires specific metallurgical processes to recover.

In general, the dense soil cover in the area makes it difficult to locate gold-bearing outcrops. The area's streams and rivers yield tiny amounts of alluvial gold and artisanal activities are seasonal, with peak activity during the wet season, decreasing during the dry season. Artisanal workings typically focus on the fine residue dumps of abandoned bigger mines in the vicinity. There are currently no observed artisanal workings in hard rock sources.

== Tectonic history ==
The belt has undergone several phases of deformation and metamorphism. These events created the mountains through folding and thrust faulting, followed by subsequent erosion that further changed the mineralogy in some cases. The tectonic evolution of the Giyani Greenstone Belt is intimately linked to that recorded in the Silverton province, which along with most other cratons on Earth hosts ancient rock preservation records.

== Mining history ==
Prospectors Edward Button and Sutherland (from California) discovered the Murchison and Sutherland Greenstone Belt goldfields in 1870. Gold was initially extracted from the Labata and Shingwedzi rivers in the Sutherland Range. In 1886, the gold rush began and the Zuid-Afrikaansche Republiek declared it a public mining site, which also led to the establishment of the town of Leydsdorp. As in many places, the Second Anglo-Boer War disrupted mining, and later, the Witwatersrand goldfields outperformed the Eastern Transvaal discoveries. Yet, in both belts the gold was found to be refractory at depth.
