= Swazian =

Geologic stage of southern Africa, 4-3 or 3.5-2.8 Ga

The Swazian is a poorly defined geological stage in South Africa extending from about four to three billion years ago, encompassing some of the Hadean and much of the Archean on the Geologic time scale. Other scales assign the Swazian to parts of the Paleoarchean and Mesoarchean, 3.5 to 2.8 billion years ago. The Swazian is not recognized by the International Commission on Stratigraphy nor by the Geological Society of America, the two most widely accepted developers of international geologic time scales.
