= South Pass greenstone belt =

Coordinates: 42.51°N 108.77°W

The South Pass greenstone belt (2.8 Ga) is located within the Wyoming Craton in the United States. The region was the site of Wyoming's initial gold discovery in 1842.

== Economic geology ==
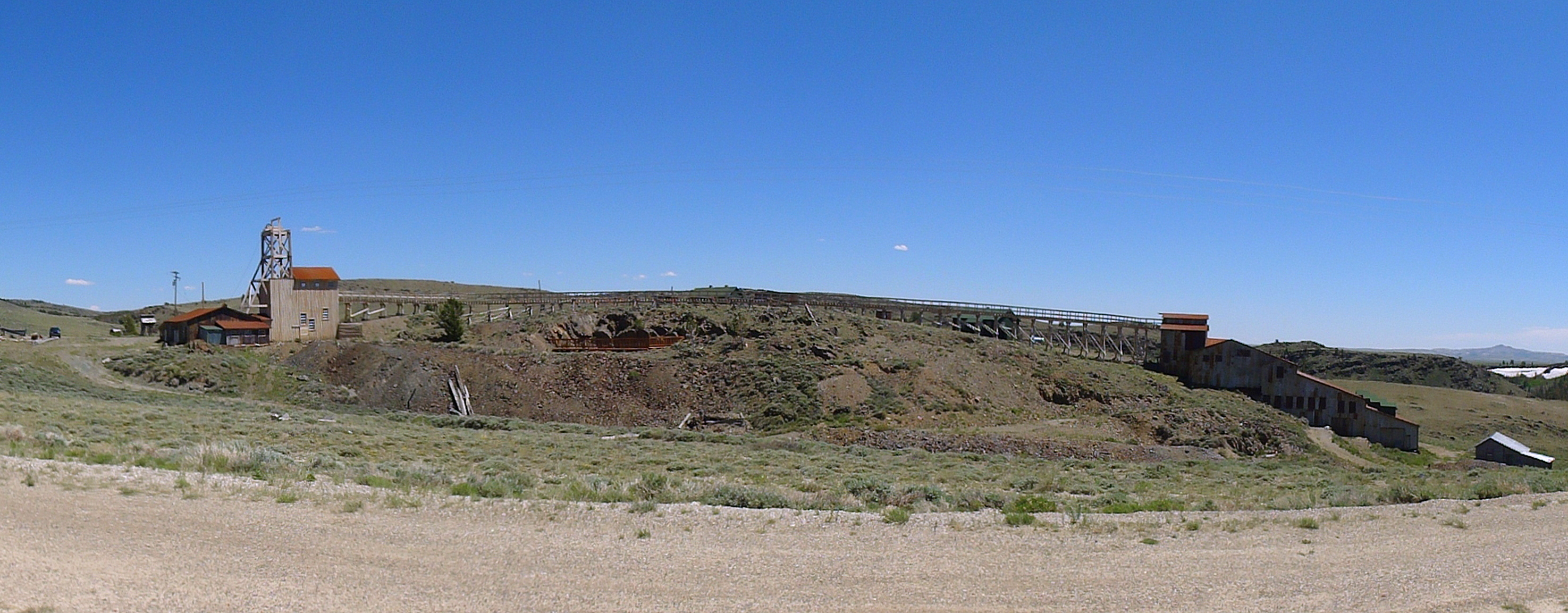
Carissa Gold Mine at South Pass City, Wyoming taken on 2011/06/28

Gold was discovered in the Lewiston district of the South Pass granite-greenstone belt in 1842 along the eastern margin of the complex. Other discoveries followed including the discovery of high-grade gold mineralization at the Carissa Mine along the western flank of the belt in 1867. Some high-grade gold was recovered from the Lewiston and the South Pass-Atlantic City districts. One large 34-ounce nugget resides in the Los Angeles Museum of Natural History that was recovered from Rock Creek along the western flank of the greenstone belt.

In addition to gold, significant iron ore deposits were found along the northern edge of the South Pass greenstone belt. Some minor copper, silver, tungsten, asbestos, beryl (aquamarine), ruby including a diamond have also been reported within the region. Development of the large taconite (iron ore) deposits in the 1950s led to the opening of the Atlantic City iron mine, which produced more than 90 million tons of iron ore between 1962 and 1983 from banded iron formation in the Goldman Meadows Formation. Extensive gold development took place across the entire Precambrian greenstone belt in the late 1860s to early 1870s, and again in the 1930s until World War II. Lode deposits occur primarily in strike-trending shear zones within metagreywacke and hornblendic orthoamphibolites, and placer operations have developed at various times along most streams downstream from these shear structures.

Hausel reported cursory investigations of the historic Carissa Mine during the late 1980s indicated this mine hosted an identifiable reserve of more than 109,000 ounces averaging 0.343 to 0.850 oz/ton with a cutoff grade of 0.299 oz/ton. But due to scattered drilling and lack of deep drilling on this property, this high-grade zone is probably much more extensive along strike and depth. The high cutoff grade combined with the essentially untested large tonnage low-grade mineralized zone associated with the property (>1000 feet wide and >1000 feet long) suggests actual gold resources are much greater. In addition to the Carissa property, a distinct belt of prospects and historic mines lie between the Carissa mine and Miners Delight mine along a 4 to 5 mile northeasterly trend in the belt. This provides a structurally favorable zone for a major gold resource. Mapping by Hausel identified numerous shear structures along with steeply plunging ore shoots associated with isoclinal and open folding that may be favorable for saddle reef-type gold mineralization. There is little evidence that any of the historic operations recognized the steeply plunging structures as being significant.

The margins of the greenstone belt contain major gold anomalies within Tertiary sediments eroded from the greenstone belt. The Cathedral Bluffs Tongue of the Eocene Wasatch Formation, is estimated to host more than 28.5 million ounces of placer gold in the Dickie Springs-Oregon Gulch area.

Some aquamarine beryl is known in pegmatite in the South Pass Granite in the Anderson Ridge area in the northwestern corner of the belt. Non-gem beryl is reported from several coarse-grained tourmaline-beryl granite pegmatites in the area.

== Geologic units ==
The geology for the South Pass belt was investigated by Hausel.

This elongate greenstone belt is characterized by Hausel as a synclinorium of metamorphosed volcanic, sedimentary and plutonic rocks that have been regionally metamorphosed to greenschist and amphibolite facies, and locally overprinted by a later retrogressive greenschist facies event. The axis of the belt is paralleled by foliation, shear zones, and lower order fold axes, and has been intruded along its flanks by granite and granodiorite.

=== Archean ===
Granite and granite pegmatite (2545 ± 30 Ma) intrude metasedimentary rock of the Miners Delight Formation in the western part of the greenstone belt. The South Pass pluton is a pegmatitic granite west of South Pass City, and the Sweetwater granite is a fine-to medium-grained leucocratic granite that occurs to the west of the South Pass pluton along the Sweetwater River and Lander Creek.

The first granitic event in the South Pass area includes tonalite dikes and plugs intruded into shear zones in the South Pass supracrustal rocks along with light-colored, metamorphosed leucodacite porphyry and quartz diorite. This unit is exposed in small areas near the Mary Ellen mine, just west of the Duncan mine, and in a 6-mile long north-trending intrusion east of Lewiston. A quartz vein included within the Mary Ellen stock carries visible gold, and a quartz stringer within sheared metaleucodacite porphyry dike contained disseminated arsenopyrite, and showed 0.01 oz/ton gold along with 0.01 oz/ton silver.

==== South Pass greenstone belt metasedimentary and metaigneous rocks ====
The Miners Delight Formation is a metagreywacke (2.8 Ga). The diverse lithology of the Miners Delight Formation, ranging in thickness from 5000 to 20,000 feet, is dominated by gray to dark brown feldspathic and biotitic metagreywacke, and mica schist. An Rb-Sr whole-rock isochron of about 2.8 Ga reported for the greywacke by Stuckless and others (1985). The contact between the Miners Delight formation and the Roundtop Mountain Greenstone is the Roundtop fault, which is locally marked by mylonitized, brecciated, and strongly folded rocks. The Miners Delight formation which hosts several epigenetic shear zone and vein gold deposits is subdivided into several lithologic units, the relative ages of which are not known.

The Roundtop Mountain Greenstone is predominantly greenstone, greenschist, and amphibolite, but also includes mica schist, hornblende-mica schist, and metabasalt, accompanied by minor metagreywacke, metatuff, chlorite schist, tremolite-actinolite schist and rare grunerite schist. The unit is exposed on both limbs of the South Pass synclinorium, and in most places conformably, but locally unconformably, overlies the Goldman Meadows Formation. Much of the unit is composed of metamorphosed pillow basalts and cusp-shaped pillow structures are preserved on Roundtop Mountain. A broad zone of carbonated breccias and intensely folded schists, representing a major break in the geologic record, is found at the top of the formation.

The Goldman Meadows Formation overlies the Diamond Springs Formation and contains two distinct lithologies: a schist member that includes pelitic schists, quartzites and massive to schistose amphibolites; and iron formation members composed of banded quartz-magnetite-amphibolite iron formation. The iron formation consists of laminated dark gray to black, fine-grained, hard, dense alternating 0.1-to-2-inch-thick (2.5 to 50.8 mm) layers of magnetite and metachert and varying amounts of amphibole. The average iron content in the Atlantic City area is about 33.5% and ranges as high as 56.23%.

The Diamond Springs Formation is conformable with the overlying rocks and consists predominantly of serpentinite, tremolite-talc-chlorite schist, and amphibolite. Compositionally, these rocks are typical of the basal volcanic members in other Archean terranes, and represent high-magnesian, sub-marine flows and sills.

=== Gneiss complex ===
Felsic gneiss and granite migmatite, interlayered with supracrustal rocks and intruded by granodiorite, is intercalated in places with the supracrustal rocks of the greenstone belt. It is suggested that the likely origin for this unit is an ancient basement or earlier supracrustal succession tectonically interleaved as thrust splinters into the South Pass supracrustals.

== See also ==
- List of greenstone belts
