= Volcanism of Eastern Canada =

Volcanic activity in Eastern Canada

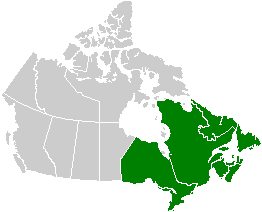
Eastern Canada, defined politically.

The volcanism of Eastern Canada includes the hundreds of volcanic areas and extensive lava formations in Eastern Canada. The region's different volcano and lava types originate from different tectonic settings and types of volcanic eruptions, ranging from passive lava eruptions to violent explosive eruptions. Eastern Canada has very large volumes of magmatic rock called large igneous provinces. They are represented by deep-level plumbing systems consisting of giant dike swarms, sill provinces and layered intrusions. The most capable large igneous provinces in Eastern Canada are Archean (3,800-2,500 million years ago) age greenstone belts containing a rare volcanic rock called komatiite.

== Greenstone belts ==
=== Abitibi greenstone belt ===
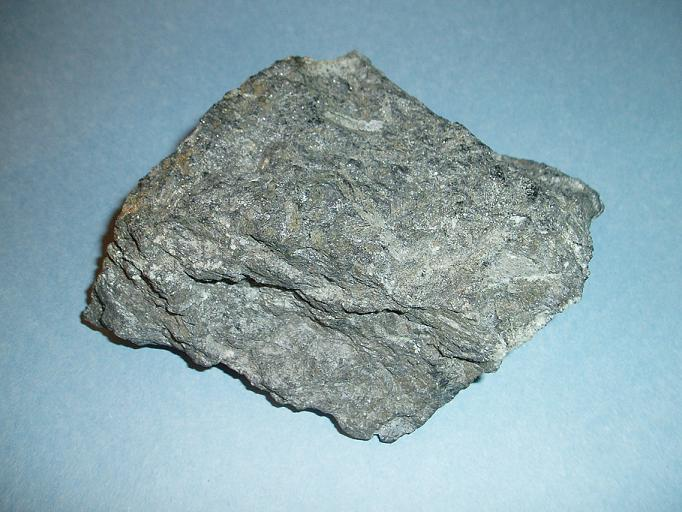
Komatiite sample collected in the Abitibi greenstone belt near Englehart, Ontario. Specimen is 9 cm wide. Bladed olivine crystals are visible, though spinifex texture is weak or absent in this sample.

The 2,677 million year old Abitibi greenstone belt in Ontario and Quebec is one of the largest Archean greenstone belts on Earth and one of the youngest parts of the Superior craton which sequentially forms part of the Canadian Shield. Komatiite lavas in the Abitibi greenstone belt (pictured) occur in four lithotectonic assemblages known as Pacaud, Stoughton-Roquemaure, Kidd-Munro and Tisdale. The Swayze greenstone belt further south is interpreted to be a southwestern extension of the Abitibi greenstone belt.

=== Red Lake greenstone belt ===
The Distribution of Ancient Volcanic Rocks along the Eastern Border of North America.

The Archean Red Lake greenstone belt in Northwestern Ontario consists of basaltic and komatiitic volcanics ranging in age from 2,925 to 2,940 million years old and younger rhyolite-andesite volcanics ranging in age from 2,730 to 2,750 million years old. It is situated in the western portion of the Uchi Subprovince, a volcanic sequence comprising a number of greenstone belts.

== Plume and rift complexes ==
=== Circum-Superior Belt ===
The 1884-1864 million year old Circum-Superior Belt constitutes a large igneous province extending for more than 3,400 km (2,113 mi) from the Labrador Trough in Labrador and northeastern Quebec though the Cape Smith Belt in northern Quebec, the Belcher Islands in southern Nunavut, the Fox River and Thompson belts in northern Manitoba, the Winnipegosis komatiite belt in central Manitoba, and on the southern side of the Superior craton in the Animikie Basin of northwestern Ontario. Two volcano-sedimentary sequences exist in the Labrador Trough with ages of 2,170-2,140 million years and 1,883-1,870 million years. In the Cape Smith Belt, two volcanic groups range in age from 2,040 to 1,870 million years old called the Povungnituk volcano-sedimentary Group and the Chukotat Group. The Belcher Islands in eastern Hudson Bay contain two volcanic sequences known as the Flaherty and Eskimo volcanics. The Fox River Belt consists of volcanics, sills and sediments some 1,883 million years old while magmatism of the Thompson Belt is dated to 1,880 million years old. To the south lies the 1,864 million year old Winnipegosis komatiites. In the Animikie Basin near Lake Superior, volcanism is dated 1,880 million years old.

=== Midcontinent Rift System ===
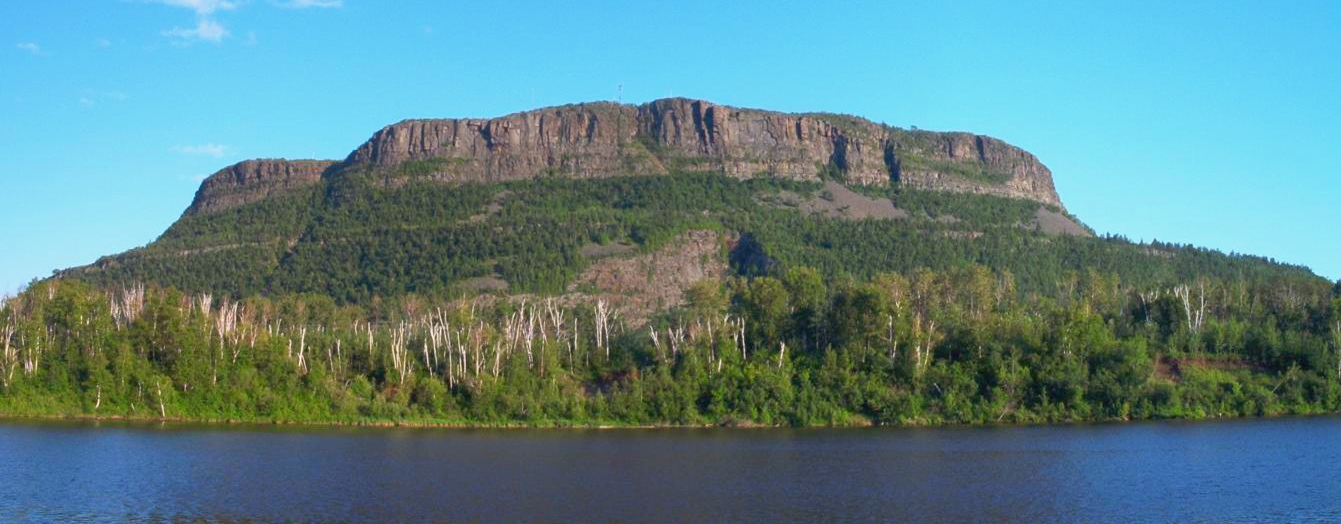
Mount McKay, a mafic sill related to volcanism of the Midcontinent Rift System in Thunder Bay, Ontario.

During the Mesoproterozoic era of the Precambrian period 1,109 million years ago, northwestern Ontario began to split apart to form the Midcontinent Rift System, also called the Keweenawan Rift. Lava flows created by the rift in the Lake Superior area were formed from basaltic magma. The upwelling of this magma was the result of a hotspot which produced a triple junction in the vicinity of Lake Superior. The hotspot made a dome that covered the Lake Superior area. Voluminous basaltic lava flows erupted from the central axis of the rift, similar to the rifting that formed the Atlantic Ocean. A failed arm extends 150 km (93 mi) north into mainland Ontario where it forms a geological formation known as the Nipigon Embayment. This failed arm includes Lake Nipigon, the largest lake entirely within the boundaries of Ontario.

=== New England hotspot track ===
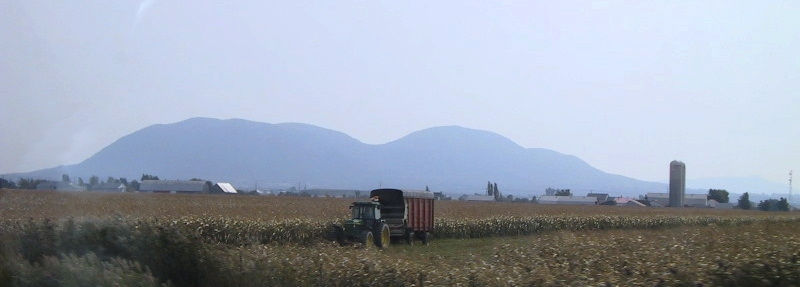
Mont Saint-Hilaire, an intrusive mountain of the Monteregian Hills in southern Quebec formed by the New England hotspot

Periods of volcanic activity occurred throughout central Canada during the Jurassic and Cretaceous periods. The source for this volcanism was a long-lived and stationary area of molten rock called the New England or Great Meteor hotspot. The first event erupted kimberlite magma in the James Bay lowlands region of northern Ontario 180 million years ago, creating the Attawapiskat kimberlite field. Another kimberlite event spanned a period of 13 million years 165 to 152 million years ago, creating the Kirkland Lake kimberlite field in northeastern Ontario. Another period of kimberlite volcanism occurred in northeastern Ontario 154 to 134 million years ago, creating the Lake Timiskaming kimberlite field. As the North American Plate moved westward over the New England hotspot, the New England hotspot created the magma intrusions of the Monteregian Hills in Montreal in southern Quebec. These intrusive stocks have been variously interpreted as the feeder intrusions of long extinct volcanoes that would have been active 125 million years ago, or as intrusions that never breached the surface in volcanic activity. The lack of a noticeable hotspot track west of the Monteregian Hills might be due either to failure of the New England mantle plume to pass through massive strong rock of the Canadian Shield, the lack of noticeable intrusions, or to strengthening of the New England mantle plume when it approached the Monteregian Hills region.

=== Fundy Basin ===
Basal contact of a lava flow section of the Fundy Basin

About 250 million years ago during the early Triassic period, Atlantic Canada lay roughly in the middle of a giant continent called Pangaea. This supercontinent began to fracture 220 million years ago when the Earth's lithosphere was being pulled apart from extensional stress, creating a divergent plate boundary known as the Fundy Basin. The focus of the rifting began somewhere between where present-day eastern North America and northwestern Africa were joined. During the formation of the Fundy Basin, volcanic activity never stopped as shown by the going eruption of lava along the Mid-Atlantic Ridge; an underwater volcanic mountain range in the Atlantic Ocean formed as a result of continuous seafloor spreading between eastern North America and northwestern Africa. As the Fundy Basin continued to form 201 million years ago, a series of basaltic lava flows were erupted, forming a volcanic mountain range on the mainland portion of southwestern Nova Scotia known as North Mountain, stretching 200 km (124 mi) from Brier Island in the south to Cape Split in the north. This series of lava flows cover most of the Fundy Basin and extend under the Bay of Fundy where parts of it are exposed on the shore at the rural community of Five Islands, east of Parrsboro on the north side of the bay. Large dikes 4 m (13 ft) to 30 m (98 ft) wide exist throughout southernmost New Brunswick with ages and compositions similar to the North Mountain basalt, indicating these dikes were the source for North Mountain lava flows. However, North Mountain is the remnants of a larger volcanic feature that has now been largely eroded based on the existence of basin border faults and erosion. The hard basaltic ridge of North Mountain resisted the grinding of ice sheets that flowed over this region during the past ice ages, and now forms one side of the Annapolis Valley in the western part of the Nova Scotia peninsula. The layering of a North Mountain lava flow less than 175 m (574 ft) thick at McKay Head, closely resemble that of some Hawaiian lava lakes, indicating Hawaiian eruptions occurred during the formation of North Mountain.

=== Seamounts ===
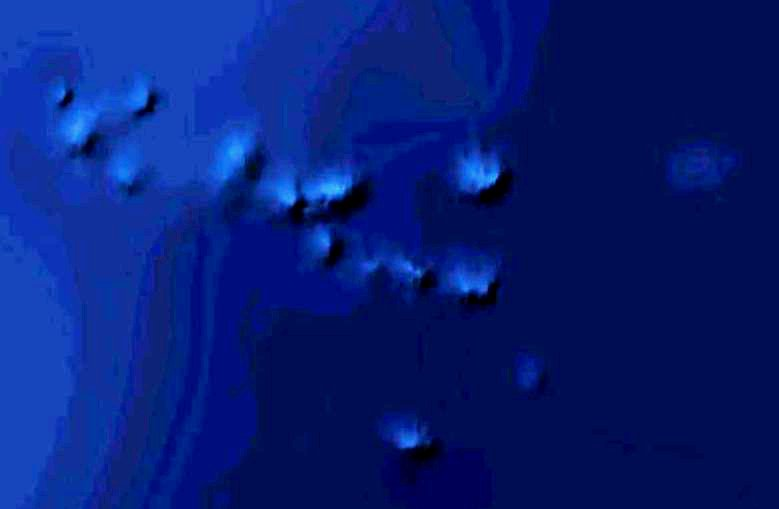
Satellite image of the Newfoundland Seamounts.

The Fogo Seamounts, located 500 km (311 mi) offshore of Newfoundland to the southwest of the Grand Banks, consists of submarine volcanoes with dates extending back to the Early Cretaceous period at least 143 million years ago. They may have one or two origins. The Fogo Seamounts could have formed along fracture zones in the Atlantic seafloor because of the large number of seamounts on the North American continental shelf. The other explanation for their origin is they formed above a mantle plume associated with the Canary or Azores hotspots in the Atlantic Ocean, based on the existence of older seamounts to the northwest and younger seamounts to the southeast. The existence of flat-topped seamounts throughout the Fogo Seamount chain indicate some of these seamounts would once have stood above sea level as islands that would have been volcanically active. Their flatness is due to coastal erosion, such as waves and winds. Other submarine volcanoes offshore of Eastern Canada include the poorly studied Newfoundland Seamounts.

== See also ==
- Geology of Ontario
- Shelburne dike
- Volcanism of Canada
- Volcanism of Western Canada
- Volcanism of Northern Canada
- List of volcanoes in Canada
