= Hunt River greenstone belt =

Coordinates: 55°38′53.73″N 60°30′58.70″W

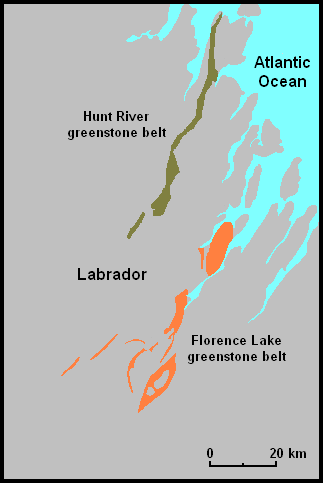
Map of the Hunt River and Florence Lake greenstone belts

The Hunt River greenstone belt, also called the Hunt River volcanic belt, is a northeast trending Mesoarchean greenstone belt in Newfoundland and Labrador, Canada, located along the coast of Labrador about 25 km (16 mi) west of the town of Hopedale. It is 70 km (43 mi) long and consists of metavolcanic and metasedimentary rocks.

== See also ==
- List of greenstone belts
