= Central Lapland Greenstone Belt =

Greenstone belt located in the Fennoscandian Shield

The Central Lapland Greenstone Belt (CLGB) is a greenstone belt located in the northern part of the Fennoscandian Shield. The region belongs to Lapland, northern Finland. The CLGB is part of a much larger belt of Paleoproterozoic greenstones, a cover of metamorphosed volcanic and sedimentary rocks that cover the Archean basement, the latter which is representative of the Archaean Karelian craton. Deposition of the cover sequence occurred between about 2.5 Ga and 1.8 Ga, thus it preserves information about Earth's history from a period that encompass about 700 Ma.

Thus, the CLGB records a prolonged and episodic history of rifting, sedimentation and magmatism before the collision and rift closure at about 1.9 Ga. The collision was related to the amalgamation of the supercontinent Columbia. The CLGB is considered to have significant potential for gold deposits.

== See also ==
- Lapland Granulite Belt
- List of greenstone belts
