= Greenstone belt =

Zone of variably metamorphosed rocks occurring in Archaean and Proterozoic cratons

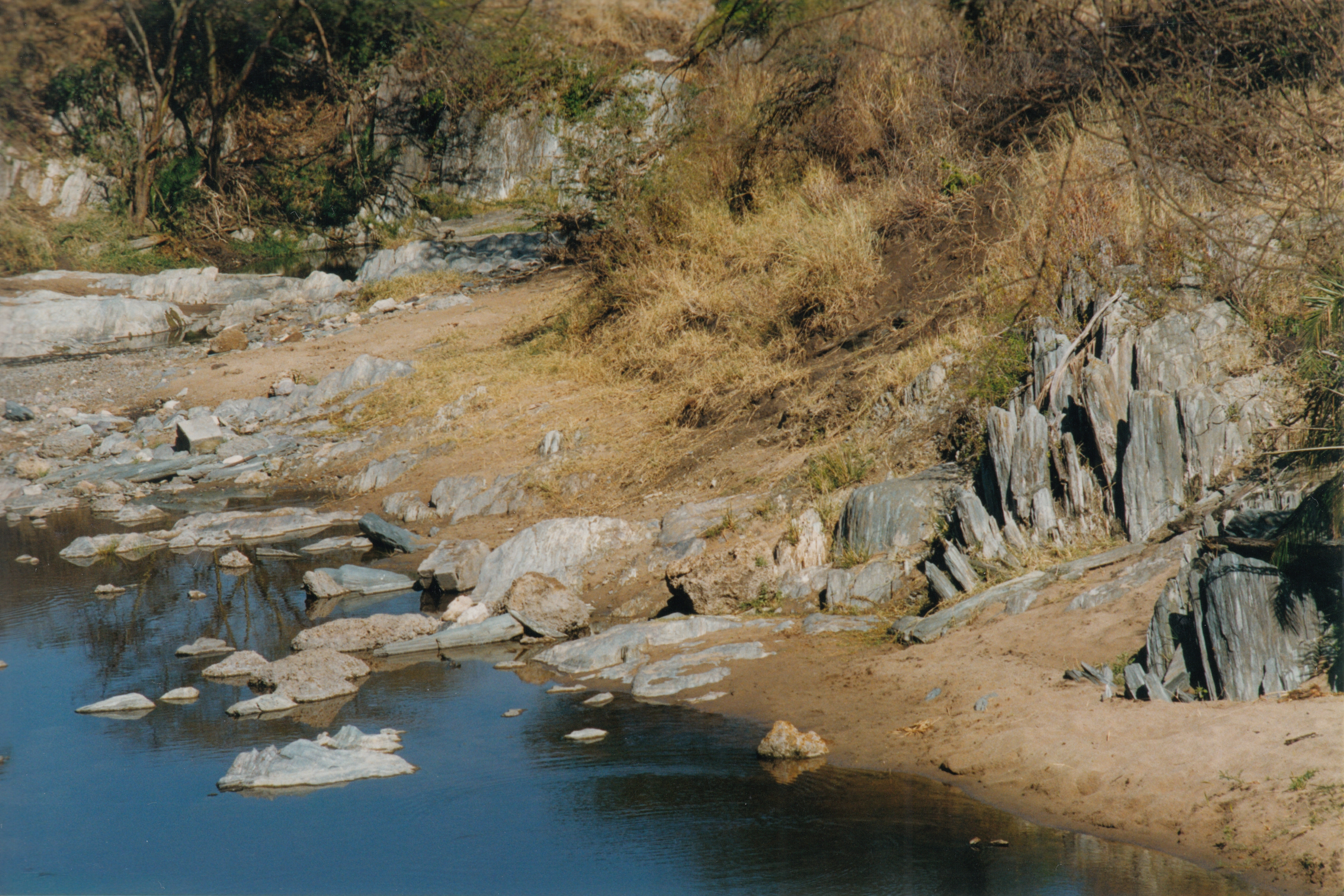
Kilimafedha greenstone belt in Tanzania

Greenstone belts are zones of variably metamorphosed mafic to ultramafic volcanic sequences with associated sedimentary rocks that occur within Archaean and Proterozoic cratons between granite and gneiss bodies.

The name comes from the green hue imparted by the colour of the metamorphic minerals within the mafic rocks: The typical green minerals are chlorite, actinolite, and other green amphiboles. Greenstone belts also often contain ore deposits of gold, silver, copper, zinc, and lead.

A greenstone belt is typically several dozens to several thousand kilometres long. Typically, a greenstone belt within the greater volume of otherwise homogeneous granite-gneiss within a craton contains a significantly larger degree of heterogeneity and complications and forms a tectonic marker far more distinct than the much more voluminous and homogeneous granites. Additionally, a greenstone belt contains far more information on tectonic and metamorphic events, deformations, and paleogeologic conditions than the granite and gneiss events, because the vast majority of greenstones are interpreted as altered basalts and other volcanic or sedimentary rocks. As such, understanding the nature and origin of greenstone belts is the most fruitful way of studying Archaean geological history.

== Nature and formation ==
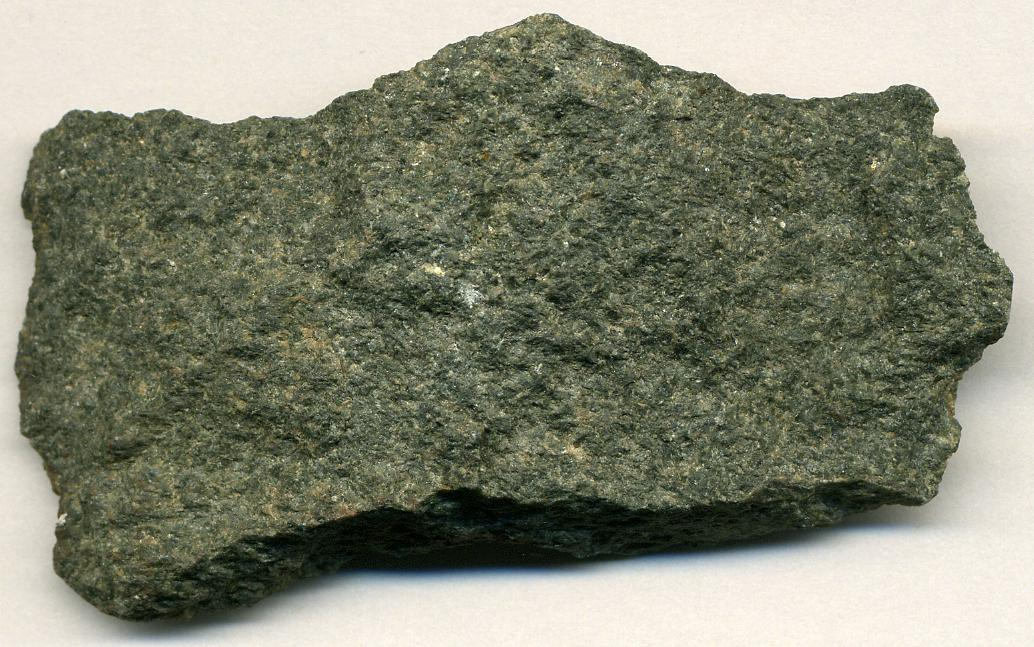
Metamorphosed pillow lava from the Ishpeming Greenstone Belt in Michigan

Greenstone belts have been interpreted as having formed at ancient oceanic spreading centers and island arc terranes.

Greenstone belts are primarily formed of volcanic rocks, dominated by basalt, with minor sedimentary rocks inter-leaving the volcanic formations. Through time, the degree of sediment contained within greenstone belts has risen, and the amount of ultramafic rock (either as layered intrusions or as volcanic komatiite) has decreased.

There is also a change in the structure and relationship of greenstone belts to their basements between the Archaean where there is little clear relationship, if any, between basalt-peridotite sheets of a greenstone belt and the granites they abut, and the Proterozoic where greenstone belts sit upon granite-gneiss basements and / or other greenstone belts, and the Phanerozoic where clear examples of island arc volcanism, arc sedimentation and ophiolite sequences become more dominant.

This change in nature is interpreted as a response to the maturity of the plate tectonics processes throughout the Earth's geological history. Archaean plate tectonics did not take place on mature crust and as such the presence of thrust-in allochthonous greenstone belts is expected. By the Proterozoic, magmatism was occurring around cratons and with established sedimentary sources, with little recycling of the crust, allowing preservation of more sediments. By the Phanerozoic, extensive continental cover and lower heat flow from the mantle has seen greater preservation of sediments and greater influence of continental masses.

Greenstones, aside from containing basalts, also give rise to several types of metamorphic rocks which are used synonymously with 'metabasalt' et cetera; greenschist, whiteschist and blueschist are all terms spawned from the study of greenstone belts.

The West African early Proterozoic greenstone belts are similar to the Archean greenstone belts. These similarities include a decrease in the amount of ultramafic and mafic rocks as you move up the stratigraphic column, in addition to an increase in pyroclastics, felsic and/or andesite rocks. Also, the rock successions tend to have clastics in the upper portion and tholeiitic suites in the lower. Calc-alkaline dikes are common in these suites.

== Distribution ==
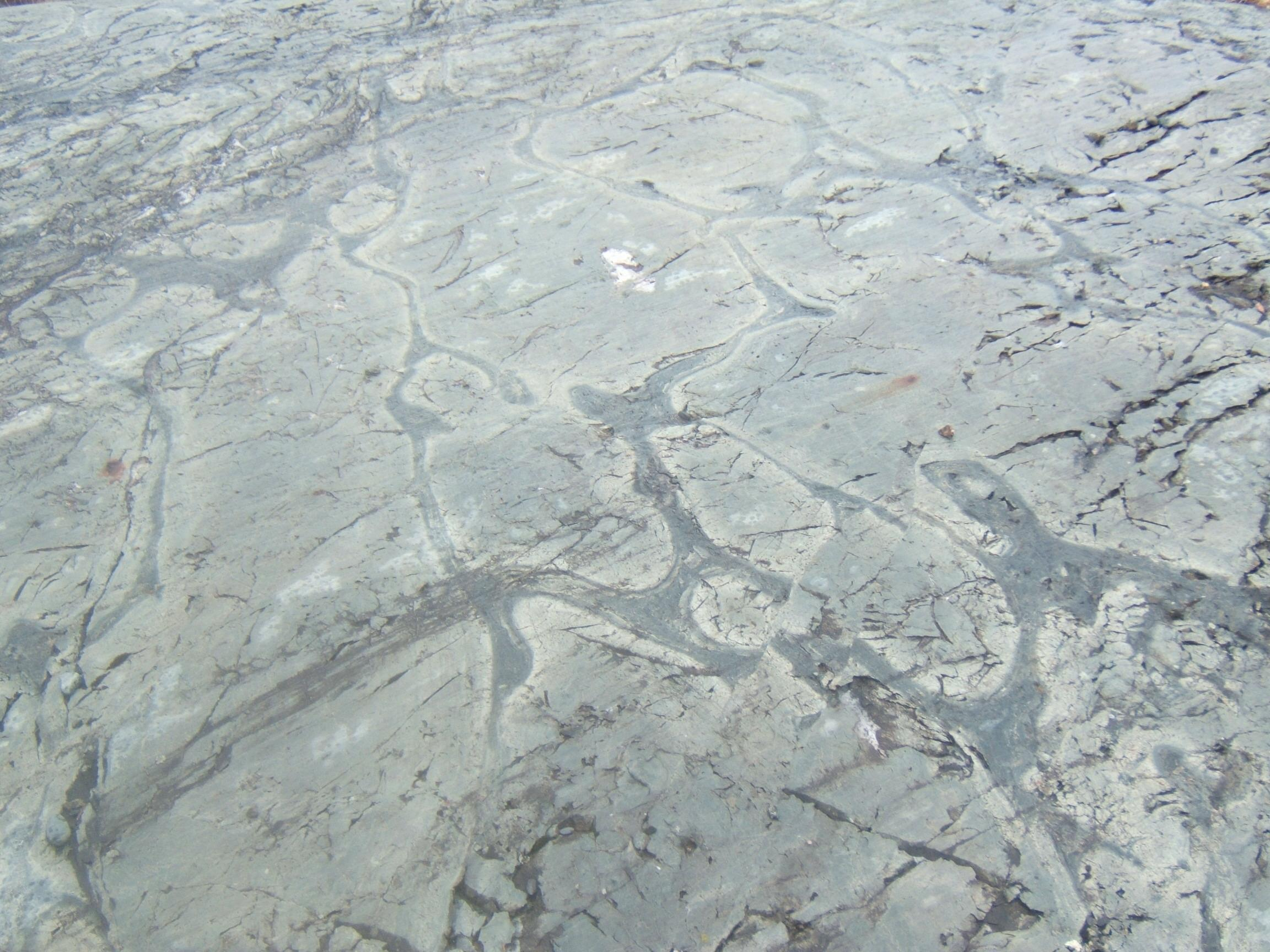
Weathered Precambrian pillow lava in the Temagami greenstone belt on the Canadian Shield

Archaean greenstones are found in the Slave craton, northern Canada, Pilbara craton and Yilgarn craton, Western Australia, Gawler craton in South Australia, and in the Wyoming Craton in the US. Examples are found in South and Eastern Africa, namely the Kaapvaal craton and also in the cratonic core of Madagascar, as well as West Africa and Brazil, northern Scandinavia and the Kola Peninsula (see Baltic Shield).

Proterozoic greenstones occur sandwiched between the Pilbara and Yilgarn cratons in Australia, and adjoining the Gawler craton and within the extensive Proterozoic mobile belts of Australia, within West Africa, throughout the metamorphic complexes surrounding the Archaean core of Madagascar; the eastern United States, northern Canada and northern Scandinavia. The Abitibi greenstone belt in Ontario and Quebec is one of the largest Archean greenstone belts in the world.

In Antarctica, the Proterozoic-aged Fisher Massif closely resembles the composition and structure of a greenstone belt.

One of the best known greenstone belts in the world is the South African Barberton greenstone belt, where gold was first discovered in South Africa. The Barberton Greenstone belt was first uniquely identified by Prof Annhauser at the University of the Witwatersrand, Johannesburg. His work in mapping and detailing the characteristics of the Barberton Greenstone belt has been used as a primer for other greenstone belts around the world. He noted the existence of pillow lavas, indicating a lava being rapidly cooled in water, as well as the spinifex textures created by crystals formed under rapidly cooling environments, namely water.

== List of greenstone belts ==
=== Africa ===
- Barberton Greenstone Belt (South Africa)
- Giyani Greenstone Belt (South Africa)
- Pietersberg greenstone belt (South Africa)
- Gwanda Greenstone Belt (Zimbabwe)
- Kilimafedha Greenstone Belt (East Africa)
- Lake Victoria Greenstone Belt (East Africa)
- Boromo-Goren Greenstone Belt (West Africa)
- Hounde Greenstone Belt (Burkina Faso)
- Boromo Greenstone Belt (Burkina Faso)

=== Asia ===
- Taishan greenstone belt (East Asia)
- Ramagiri-Hungund greenstone belt (Dharwar Craton), India
- Babina greenstone belt (Bundelkhand craton), India
- Mauranipur greenstone belt (Bundelkhand craton), India
- Iron Ore Group, East Indian Shield, India

=== Europe ===
- Kostomuksha greenstone belt (Russia)
- Central Lapland Greenstone Belt (Lapland, Finland)
- Kuhmo-Suomussalmi Greenstone Belt, Finland
- Mauken greenstone belt (Norway)
- Verkhivtseve Greenstone Belt (Ukraine)

=== North America ===
- Abitibi greenstone belt (Quebec/Ontario, Canada)
- Bird River greenstone belt (Manitoba, Canada)
- Elmers Rock greenstone belt (Wyoming, USA)
- Flin Flon greenstone belt (Manitoba/Saskatchewan, Canada)
- Hope Bay greenstone belt (in the western portion of Kivalliq Region, Nunavut, Canada)
- Hunt River greenstone belt (Newfoundland and Labrador, Canada)
- Isua greenstone belt (Southwestern Greenland)
- Nuvvuagittuq greenstone belt (Quebec, Canada)
- Pecos greenstone belt (New Mexico, US)
- Rattlesnake Hills greenstone belt (Wyoming, US)
- Seminoe Mountains greenstone belt (Wyoming, US)
- South Pass greenstone belt (Wyoming, US)
- Temagami Greenstone Belt (Ontario, Canada)
- Yellowknife greenstone belt (Northwest Territories, Canada)

=== South America ===
- Rio-das-Velhas greenstone belt (Minas Gerais, Brazil)
- Piumhi greenstone belt (Minas Gerais, Brazil)
- Rio-Itapicuru greenstone belt (Bahia, Brazil)
- Mundo Novo greenstone belt (Bahia, Brazil)
- Umburanas greenstone belt (Bahia, Brazil)
- Crixás greenstone belt (Goiás, Brazil)
- Faina greenstone belt (Goiás, Brazil)
- Guarinos greenstone belt (Goiás, Brazil)
- Pilar-de-Goiás greenstone belt (Goiás, Brazil)
- Northern Guiana Shield greenstone belt (Venezuela, Guyana, Suriname and French Guiana)

=== Australia ===
- Harris greenstone belt (Australia)
- Jack Hills greenstone belt (Australia)
- Lake Johnston greenstone belt (Australia)
- Norseman-Wiluna greenstone belt (Australia)
- Southern Cross greenstone belt (Australia)
- Yandal Greenstone Belt (Australia)
- Yalgoo-Singleton greenstone belt (Australia)

== Sources ==
- de Wit, Maarten J.; Ashwal, Lewis D. (1997). "Excerpts and maps". Greenstone Belts. Clarendon Press. ISBN 0-19-854056-6. Archived from the original on 4 February 2012.
- Lowe, D.R. (December 1994). "Accretionary history of the Archean Barberton greenstone belt (3.55–3.22 Ga), southern Africa". Geology. 22 (12): 1099–1102. Bibcode:1994Geo....22.1099L. doi:10.1130/0091-7613(1994)022<1099:AHOTAB>2.3.CO;2. PMID 11539408.
