= Abitibi greenstone belt =

Greenstone belt that spans across the Ontario–Quebec border in Canada

The Abitibi greenstone belt is a 2,800-to-2,600-million-year-old greenstone belt that spans across the Ontario–Quebec border in Canada. It is mostly made of volcanic rocks, but also includes ultramafic rocks, mafic intrusions, granitoid rocks, and early and middle Precambrian sediments.

== Geographical extent ==
The Abitibi greenstone belt is one of the world's largest Archean greenstone belts. It represents a series of subterranes that exhibit similar geological, geochemical, and isotopic signatures similar to those formed during the evolution of paired active-arc-back-arc systems. The huge 2,707-to-2,696-million-year-old Blake River Megacaldera Complex is within the belt.

== See also ==
- Abitibi gold belt
- List of greenstone belts
- Volcanism of Canada
- Volcanism of Eastern Canada
